= The Manson Family Album =

1993 demo album by Marilyn Manson

- Hitachi Maxell re-recordable cassette cover, featuring the album's track listing handwritten by the band's guitarist, Daisy Berkowitz.

Demo album by Marilyn Manson
- Released: Unreleased
- Recorded: July–Fall 1993
- Studios: Criteria Studios, Miami
- Genre: Industrial metal
- Length: 56:58
- Producer: Roli Mosimann

Marilyn Manson chronology
The Manson Family Album (1993)	Portrait of an American Family (1994)

The Manson Family Album is the first studio recording by American rock band Marilyn Manson and a precursor to their debut studio album, 1994's Portrait of an American Family. It was produced by Roli Mosimann and is composed of original takes and mixes of songs which were later found on their debut album. However, the band was unhappy with Mosimann's production, claiming it to be poorly representative of their established sound and calling it too "smoothed and polished". The majority of songs on The Manson Family Album were later re-recorded or remixed by Nine Inch Nails personnel Trent Reznor, Sean Beaven and Alan Moulder at the Record Plant in Los Angeles. The album's title is a double entendre; it also relates to the commune of cult leader Charles Manson.

== Background ==
Marilyn Manson and the Spooky Kids were formed in December 1989 after vocalist Marilyn Manson met guitarist Daisy Berkowitz at the Reunion Room nightclub, in Fort Lauderdale, Florida. The pair, invariably joined by numerous other musicians, recorded several EPs of original demos over the next three years, with Berkowitz composing the majority of the music and Manson writing lyrics. The band's highly visualized live shows – which routinely featured naked women nailed to a crucifix, young children locked in cages, and an assortment of butchered animal remains – quickly earned them a loyal fanbase among the South Florida punk and hardcore music scene. Within six months of forming, the band was playing sold-out shows in 300-capacity nightclubs throughout Florida.

While working as a journalist for 25th Parallel in February 1990, Manson interviewed Nine Inch Nails vocalist Trent Reznor, during that band's stint opening for The Jesus and Mary Chain. The two remained friends, with Manson eventually presenting Reznor with a compilation of demos. Nine Inch Nails keyboardist Chris Vrenna later said: "One day we were driving across Texas, and Texas is a long boring drive of nothing but tumbleweeds for a thousand miles and so Trent was like, 'Let's listen to [Manson's] tape' because we were so bored with all our CDs in the van. He popped it in and we got about two songs in, [and] everybody started looking at each other like, 'This is really good'. And it became our favorite tape. We listened to it all the time."

Impressed by the material, Reznor offered the group a spot opening for Nine Inch Nails and Meat Beat Manifesto at Club Nu in Miami on July 3, 1990. The band, which now included Gidget Gein on bass guitar, Madonna Wayne Gacy on keyboards, and Sara Lee Lucas on drums, continued touring and recording independently for two years, using the proceeds from a record deal signed with Sony in early 1991 to fund the recording of more demo tapes. Berkowitz later recalled that the president of A&R at Sony, Richard Griffin, "personally rejected us within minutes, saying he liked the show and the idea but 'didn't like the singer.'" In November 1992, Manson was invited by Reznor to attend unspecified "strategic talks" in Los Angeles. By the end of the year, Marilyn Manson and the Spooky Kids became the first act to be signed to Reznor's Nothing Records vanity label, shortening their name to Marilyn Manson by the beginning of 1993.

== Recording ==
Discography
1990	The Raw Boned Psalms
1990	The Beaver Meat Cleaver Beat
1990	Big Black Bus
1990	Grist-O-Line
1991	Lunchbox
1991	After School Special
1992	Live as Hell
1992	The Family Jams
1993	The Manson Family Album

Recording sessions for The Manson Family Album began in July 1993 at Criteria Studios in Miami with producer Roli Mosimann, and concluded several months later in the autumn. The record consists of re-recorded versions of numerous songs originally demoed by the band during their formative years. Two songs on the record, "My Monkey" and "Citronella (Dogma)", date back to their first commercially-sold cassette album, 1990's Big Black Bus. Mosimann's production aimed for a "sleazy, groove-laden" sound, and the band made heavy use of tape loops, sound effects, and samples during recording. At this point, "Snake Eyes and Sissies" was on track to become the album's lead single, with Mosimann creating a single edit of the song.

However, the band was unhappy with the results, believing it to be poorly representative of their live performances. Manson also complained that Mosimann's production eventuated in the songs sounding "smoothed and polished, losing [their] bite and edge. I thought, 'This really sucks'. So I played it for Trent, and he thought it sucked." At the beginning of 1994, the band relocated to the Record Plant in Los Angeles, but without bassist Gidget Gein. Gein had been fired from the band a few days before Christmas 1993, due to his ongoing addiction to heroin. Berkowitz later claimed that this was "actually the second or third time he was fired. He was a complete junkie by that point—totally out of it, wouldn't show up, or when he did he was a mess and was playing really horribly live." He was replaced by Jeordie White of Amboog-a-Lard, who was renamed Twiggy Ramirez. Gein later died of a heroin overdose in 2008.

The album was re-recorded over seven weeks at the Record Plant, with Manson saying: "We spent seven weeks redoing, fixing, sometimes starting from scratch. That was our band's first experience in a real studio on a project this big. We didn't know what to expect. It was fifteen-hour days, with a team – Trent, Alan Moulder, Sean Beavan, and me – bringing out the sound." Berkowitz was initially reluctant to re-record the album, saying: "I felt doing this was unnecessary, and worried it would make us look like a Nine Inch Nails/Reznor spin-off. The final result, however, is a very high-quality piece of work." He re-recorded most of his guitar work in LA, while the vast majority of Sara Lee Lucas' live drum work was replaced with drum programming created by Nine Inch Nails members Charlie Clouser and Chris Vrenna. Although he had been fired, Gein's bass work remained on the album. After re-recording, the record was renamed Portrait of an American Family, with Mosimann listed as an engineer, and no mention of his original production role.

== Aftermath and release ==
The Manson Family Album remained unreleased for several years. Following Berkowitz' acrimonious exit from the group in 1996, he initiated a lawsuit against the rest of the band. This was settled in October 1998, with Berkowitz's receiving a six-figure sum, which he described as "an evil number". Furthermore, he obtained the copyrights to the entire Spooky Kids catalogue, which included 21 previously unreleased tracks. Former bassist Gidget Gein also settled his lawsuit against the band that same year, for an amount similar to the one received by Berkowitz: "I'm not allowed to discuss the specifics of the case. But I know [Berkowitz] didn't make much more than I made, because the accountants sent his numbers to my lawyers by accident. You'd think we'd be millionaires off of the records we've sold, but no."

Berkowitz released the first in an intended two-part series of Spooky Kids recordings in 2004. Lunch Boxes & Choklit Cows was released April 20 through Empire MusicWerks. It contained 10 previously unreleased songs recorded by the band between January 1990 and November 1993, as well as a bonus DVD containing three live performances. Berkowitz gave the album to an interviewer; it was leaked onto the internet afterwards.

== Artwork ==
Although the record was never released, Manson said in his 1998 autobiography The Long Hard Road Out of Hell that he intended to use a painting by John Wayne Gacy as the album cover. The same painting later appeared as the cover for Acid Bath's 1994 album When the Kite String Pops. Also set to be included as an interior photograph was an image of Manson sitting naked on his living room couch when he was 6 years old. This image was additionally set to feature in the liner artwork for Portrait of an American Family. Though no genitalia is shown, and it was taken by his mother with no vulgar intent, Interscope's parent company Time Warner demanded it be removed. Manson said of the image: "When I was six years old, that was when Burt Reynolds had posed for Playgirl. My mom thought it'd be funny to have me do that pose, lying on a couch. It's only sick if you have a sick mind. It was innocent. But [Time Warner] told me it would qualify as child pornography in twenty states."

== Track listing ==
All lyrics written by Marilyn Manson, except "My Monkey" by Marilyn Manson and Charles Manson (uncredited).

No.	Title	Music	Length
1.	"Snakes Eyes and Sissies"	Daisy Berkowitz; Madonna Wayne Gacy; Gidget Gein	5:09
2.	"Lunchbox"	Berkowitz; Gein	4:26
3.	"Get Your Gunn"	Berkowitz; Gein	4:04
4.	"Cyclops"	Berkowitz; Gein; Gacy	3:41
5.	"Citronella" (Dogma)	Berkowitz	3:18
6.	"Cake and Sodomy"	Berkowitz	3:52
7.	"Filth"	Berkowitz	4:31
8.	"Sweet Tooth"	Gacy; Gein	4:41
9.	"Organ Grinder"	Berkowitz; Gein	5:04
10.	"My Monkey"	Berkowitz	4:52
11.	"Misery Machine"	Berkowitz; Gacy; Gein	4:54
12.	"Dope Hat"	Berkowitz; Gacy; Manson	4:27
13.	"Snakes Eyes and Sissies" (Single Mix Edit)	Berkowitz; Gacy; Gein	3:57
Total length:			56:58

The preceding track listing is derived from the order of the songs as they appeared on the leaked cassette tape. It is unclear if this was intended to be the final track order.

Differences

- "Prelude (The Family Trip)" and "Wrapped in Plastic" are not present on this version of the album; "Filth" is exclusive to this edition, and has never been commercially released.
- "Snake Eyes and Sissies" features an extra verse, resulting in it being 62 seconds longer than the version which appeared on Portrait.
- "Lunchbox" lacks the opening sample of Robert Pierce saying "Next motherfucker's gonna get my metal", and the opening guitar line contributed by Reznor.
- "Get Your Gunn" repeats the chorus and bridge more than the released version, and is 50 seconds longer.
- "Citronella" was later renamed "Dogma" for its official release, though the two versions are almost identical.
- "Sweet Tooth" lacks the 59 seconds of introductory ambient noise found on Portrait.
- This version of "My Monkey" lacks a conventional chorus, and contains significantly more audio samples taken from television interviews by Charles Manson than the Portrait version, which appear where the chorus was later inserted. Robert Pierce's vocals are also much clearer and placed higher in the mix.

== Personnel ==
Credits adapted from the liner notes of Portrait of an American Family.

- Recorded at Criteria Studios, North Miami, Florida.

Musicians

- Marilyn Manson – lead and background vocals, brass, loops
- Daisy Berkowitz – lead, rhythm, acoustic and wah-wah guitars
- Gidget Gein – bass guitar
- Madonna Wayne Gacy – keyboards, organ, saxophone, calliope, theremin, sound effects and loops
- Sara Lee Lucas – drums, drum programming and sound effects

Additional musicians and technical personnel

- Roli Mosimann – engineering and production
- Hope Nicholls – vocals, saxophone ("Citronella")
- Robert Pierce – vocals ("My Monkey")
