= Smells Like Children Tour =

1995–96 concert tour by Marilyn Manson

Smells Like Children
- Tour by Marilyn Manson
- Associated album: Smells Like Children
- Start date: June 1, 1995
- End date: February 4, 1996
- No. of shows: 105 (planned); 102 (completed)

Marilyn Manson concert chronology
- Portrait of an American Family (1994–1995); Smells Like Children (1995–1996); Dead to the World (1996–1997)

The Smells Like Children Tour was the fourth tour Marilyn Manson embarked on, under the management of major record label Interscope Records. The tour was, however, the band's second headlining tour, following the Portrait of an American Family Tour the previous year. The band was on tour from June 1, 1995, until February 4, 1996.

== Stage antics ==
The background for the shows during the Smells Like Children tour was a ouija board which read "Marilyn Manson" on the center. Another feature to the stage was the addition of a giant tree from which hung ventriloquist dummies from the branches. The stage was usually set up to accommodate small audiences, as most of the shows took place in clubs, rather than arenas.

This was the first Tour in which Manson began using stilts. The band also began their signature bizarre looks during this tour as well, by donning makeup and sexually suggestive clothes (with Manson wearing jock straps to pulling his pants down and with Twiggy beginning his traditional kinderwhore cross dressing gimmick).

As in previous tours, Manson was regularly seen cutting himself on stage during this tour. He got his main chest scarring from this tour as he got into a heated argument with a crowd member and he broke a bottle and ran it across his chest.

=== The Jon Stewart Show appearance ===
The band appeared on the June 22, 1995 episode of MTV's late-night talk show The Jon Stewart Show with host Jon Stewart. The episode featured a live performance of the songs "Lunchbox" and "Dope Hat" by the band off of their debut album 1994's Portrait of an American Family. The episode sparked nationwide controversy after frontman Marilyn Manson set a Bible ablaze onstage, which elicited public outcry of blasphemy. The band finished their set by throwing instruments around the stage, and ended with a piggyback ride offstage on Jon Stewart. Stewart later recalled the episode in his memoir Angry Optimist: The Life and Times of Jon Stewart, "The next night, Marilyn Manson was on, and they ended up lighting the stage on fire. I really thought somebody was going to be killed that week."

== Lineup ==
- Marilyn Manson: Vocals
- Daisy Berkowitz: Guitar
- Twiggy Ramirez: Bass
- Madonna Wayne Gacy: Keyboards
- Ginger Fish: Drums

== Setlist ==
The following list contains the most commonly played songs in the order they were most generally performed:

1. "Wrapped in Plastic"
2. "Snake Eyes and Sissies"
3. "Get Your Gunn"
4. "Dogma"
5. "Cyclops"
6. "Cake and Sodomy"
7. "Minute of Decay" (Early version)
8. "Down in the Park"
9. "Dope Hat"
10. "My Monkey"
11. "Smells Like Children" (Early version of "Kinderfeld")
12. "Irresponsible Hate Anthem" (Early version)
13. "Tourniquet" (Early version)
14. "Organ Grinder"
15. "Lunchbox"
16. "Sweet Dreams (Are Made of This)"
17. "Rock N Roll Nigger"
18. "Misery Machine"

== Tour overview ==
- The performance in Memphis, Tennessee on December 10, 1995, was cancelled for reasons unknown. They returned to Memphis January 26, 1996 to make up the canceled show.
- The performance in Syracuse, New York on January 15 caused a riot with several thousands of dollars' worth of damage to the venue.
- The performance in Johnson City, Tennessee on January 27, 1996, was cancelled due to throat problems with vocalist Marilyn Manson.
- The performance in Knoxville, Tennessee on January 28, 1996, was cancelled for reasons unknown.

== Tour dates ==
List of concerts, showing date, city, country, and venue
Date	City	Country	Venue	Opening Act(s)	Attendance	Revenue
June 1, 1995	Baton Rouge	United States	Papa Joe's Rock 'n' Roll Club	n/a	—N/a	—N/a
June 2, 1995	New Orleans	United States	Tipitinas	n/a	—N/a	—N/a
September 12, 1995	Tulsa	United States	Cain's Ballroom	n/a	—N/a	—N/a
September 13, 1995	Oklahoma City	United States	Will Rogers Center	n/a	—N/a	—N/a
September 15, 1995	Dallas	United States	Deep Ellum Live	n/a	—N/a	—N/a
September 16, 1995	Houston	United States	Numbers	n/a	—N/a	—N/a
September 17, 1995	Corpus Christi	United States	Johnnyland	n/a	—N/a	—N/a
September 19, 1995	San Antonio	United States	Showcase Special Events	n/a	—N/a	—N/a
September 20, 1995	Austin	United States	Backroom	n/a	—N/a	—N/a
September 22, 1995	Albuquerque	United States	El Rey Theatre	n/a	—N/a	—N/a
September 23, 1995	El Paso	United States	El Paso Metropolis	n/a	—N/a	—N/a
September 24, 1995	Tucson	United States	Rock	n/a	—N/a	—N/a
September 25, 1995	Tempe	United States	Club Rio	n/a	—N/a	—N/a
September 27, 1995	San Diego	United States	SOMA San Diego	n/a	—N/a	—N/a
September 28, 1995	Santa Barbara	United States	Santa Barbara Underground	n/a	—N/a	—N/a
September 29, 1995	Los Angeles	United States	Palace	n/a	—N/a	—N/a
October 1, 1995	Palo Alto	United States	The Edge	n/a	—N/a	—N/a
October 2, 1995	San Francisco	United States	Trocadero Transfer	n/a	733 / 1,000	$8,796
October 3, 1995	Reno	United States	Easy Street	n/a	—N/a	—N/a
October 5, 1995	Portland	United States	La Luna	n/a	—N/a	—N/a
October 6, 1995	Seattle	United States	RCKNDY	n/a	—N/a	—N/a
October 7, 1995	Vancouver	Canada	New York Theatre	n/a	541 / 700	$6,699
October 10, 1995	Denver	United States	Ogden Theatre	n/a	—N/a	—N/a
October 12, 1995	Wichita	United States	Rock Island	n/a	575 / 575	$7,139
October 13, 1995	Springfield	United States	Regency Showcase	n/a	—N/a	—N/a
October 14, 1995	Lawrence	United States	Granada	n/a	—N/a	—N/a
October 15, 1995	Omaha	United States	Ranch Bowl	n/a	554 / 600	$6,442
October 17, 1995	Grand Rapids	United States	Orbit Room	n/a	1,059 / 1,900	$12,414
October 18, 1995	Toledo	United States	Asylum	n/a	—N/a	—N/a
October 20, 1995	Cincinnati	United States	Bogarts	n/a	—N/a	—N/a
October 21, 1995	Lakewood	United States	Phantasy Theater	n/a	—N/a	—N/a
October 22, 1995	Columbus	United States	Newport Music Hall	n/a	1,474 / 1,474	$19,330
October 23, 1995	Pittsburgh	United States	Metropole	n/a	1,213 / 1,213	$15,032
October 25, 1995	Buffalo	United States	Ogden Street Music Hall	n/a	—N/a	—N/a
October 26, 1995	Rochester	United States	Water Street Music Hall	n/a	—N/a	—N/a
October 27, 1995	Toronto	Canada	Toronto Opera House	n/a	800 / 800	$8,288
October 28, 1995	Albany	United States	Saratoga Winners	n/a	—N/a	—N/a
October 30, 1995	Providence	United States	Club Babyhead	n/a	550 / 550	$5,500
October 31, 1995	Boston	United States	Mama Kin's Music Hall	n/a	—N/a	—N/a
November 1, 1995	Boston	United States	Mama Kin's Music Hall	n/a	—N/a	—N/a
November 3, 1995	New York City	United States	Irving Plaza	n/a	—N/a	—N/a
November 4, 1995	New York City	United States	Irving Plaza	n/a	—N/a	—N/a
November 5, 1995	Philadelphia	United States	Electric Factory	n/a	1,781 / 2,000	$23,191
November 6, 1995	Asbury Park	United States	Stone Pony	n/a	1,100 / 1,100	$14,575
November 8, 1995	New Haven	United States	Toad's Place	n/a	—N/a	—N/a
November 9, 1995	Washington, D.C.	United States	Capitol Ballroom	n/a	—N/a	—N/a
November 10, 1995	Norfolk	United States	Boathouse	n/a	—N/a	—N/a
November 11, 1995	Raleigh	United States	Ritz	n/a	—N/a	—N/a
November 13, 1995	Nashville	United States	328 Performance Hall	n/a	—N/a	—N/a
November 14, 1995	Louisville	United States	Brewery	n/a	—N/a	—N/a
November 15, 1995	St. Louis	United States	Mississippi Nights	n/a	—N/a	—N/a
November 16, 1995	Milwaukee	United States	T.A. Vern's	n/a	—N/a	—N/a
November 18, 1995	Sioux Falls	United States	Pomp Room	n/a	—N/a	—N/a
November 19, 1995	Minneapolis	United States	First Avenue	n/a	—N/a	—N/a
November 21, 1995	Columbia	United States	Blue Note	n/a	—N/a	—N/a
November 22, 1995	Chicago	United States	Cabaret Metro	n/a	2,200 / 2,200	$30,294
November 24, 1995	Detroit	United States	Saint Andrew's Hall	n/a	—N/a	—N/a
November 25, 1995	Detroit	United States	Saint Andrew's Hall	n/a	—N/a	—N/a
November 26, 1995	Toronto	Canada	Toronto Opera House	n/a	816 / 816	$10,276
November 27, 1995	Wilkes Barre	United States	Mantis Green	n/a	—N/a	—N/a
November 29, 1995	Fayetteville	United States	Flaming Mug	n/a	—N/a	—N/a
November 30, 1995	Winston-Salem	United States	Ziggy's Tavern	n/a	—N/a	—N/a
December 1, 1995	Wilmington	United States	Mad Monk's	n/a	—N/a	—N/a
December 2, 1995	Atlanta	United States	The Masquerade	n/a	—N/a	—N/a
December 4, 1995	Charlotte	United States	Jeremiah's	n/a	—N/a	—N/a
December 5, 1995	Columbia	United States	Rockafella's	n/a	—N/a	—N/a
December 6, 1995	Myrtle Beach	United States	Headroom	n/a	—N/a	—N/a
December 8, 1995	Baton Rouge	United States	Varsity Theater	n/a	—N/a	—N/a
December 9, 1995	New Orleans	United States	Rendon Inn	n/a	—N/a	—N/a
December 10, 1995 (Cancelled)	Memphis	United States	Six-One-Six	n/a	—N/a	—N/a
December 12, 1995	Fort Myers	United States	Pyramids	n/a	—N/a	—N/a
December 13, 1995	Tampa	United States	Masquerade	n/a	—N/a	—N/a
December 15, 1995	Orlando	United States	The Edge	n/a	1,159 / 1,600	$15,249
December 16, 1995	Fort Lauderdale	United States	The Edge	n/a	1,500 / 2,461	$39,606
December 17, 1995	Fort Lauderdale	United States	The Edge	n/a	1,500 / 2,461	$39,606
December 28, 1995	Cleveland	United States	Odeon	n/a	1,816 / 1,816	$27,150
December 29, 1995	Cleveland	United States	Odeon	n/a	1,816 / 1,816	$27,150
December 31, 1995	New York City	United States	Academy	n/a	—N/a	—N/a
January 2, 1996	Oldbridge	United States	Birch Hill Night Club	n/a	—N/a	—N/a
January 3, 1996	New London	United States	El 'n' Gee	n/a	—N/a	—N/a
January 5, 1996	Baltimore	United States	Hammerjack's	n/a	—N/a	—N/a
January 6, 1996	Allentown	United States	Starz	n/a	—N/a	—N/a
January 7, 1996	Harrisburg	United States	Metron	n/a	—N/a	—N/a
January 8, 1996	North Hampton	United States	Pearl Street Nightclub	n/a	—N/a	—N/a
January 10, 1996	Cohoes	United States	Saratoga Winners	n/a	—N/a	—N/a
January 11, 1996	Port Chester	United States	Capitol Theatre	n/a	—N/a	—N/a
January 12, 1996	Huntington	United States	Roxy Music Hall	n/a	—N/a	—N/a
January 13, 1996	Rochester	United States	Water Street Music Hall	n/a	—N/a	—N/a
January 15, 1996	Syracuse	United States	Lost Horizon	n/a	—N/a	—N/a
January 16, 1996	State College	United States	Crowbar	n/a	—N/a	—N/a
January 18, 1996	Kalamazoo	United States	State Theatre	n/a	1,376 / 1,376	$21,694
January 19, 1996	Toledo	United States	Toledo Asylum	n/a	1,000 / 1,000	$15,000
January 20, 1996	Columbus	United States	Newport Music Hall	n/a	—N/a	—N/a
January 21, 1996	Cincinnati	United States	Bogarts	n/a	—N/a	—N/a
January 23, 1996	Charlottesville	United States	Trax	n/a	—N/a	—N/a
January 25, 1996	Knoxville	United States	Electric Ballroom	n/a	—N/a	—N/a
January 26, 1996	Memphis	United States	Six-One-Six	n/a	—N/a	—N/a
January 27, 1996 (Cancelled)	Johnson City	United States	Nightmoves	n/a	—N/a	—N/a
January 28, 1996 (Cancelled)	Knoxville	United States	Electric Ballroom	n/a	—N/a	—N/a
January 29, 1996	Carrboro	United States	Cat's Cradle	n/a	—N/a	—N/a
January 30, 1996	Charleston	United States	Music Farm	n/a	—N/a	—N/a
January 31, 1996	Tallahassee	United States	Moon	n/a	—N/a	—N/a
February 2, 1996	Daytona Beach	United States	Underground Daytona Beach	n/a	—N/a	—N/a
February 3, 1996	St. Petersburg	United States	Janus Landing	n/a	—N/a	—N/a
February 4, 1996	Stuart	United States	Playground	n/a	—N/a	—N/a
