= Lest We Forget: The Best Of =

2004 greatest hits album by Marilyn Manson

Greatest hits album by Marilyn Manson
- Released: September 28, 2004
- Recorded: 1993–2004
- Genre: Alternative rock; heavy metal
- Length: 65:58
- Label: Interscope
- Producer: Sean Beavan; Michael Beinhorn; Ben Grosse; Marilyn Manson; Dave "Rave" Ogilvie; Trent Reznor; Dave Sardy; Tim Sköld

Marilyn Manson chronology
The Golden Age of Grotesque (2003)	Lest We Forget: The Best Of (2004)	Eat Me, Drink Me (2007)

Singles from Lest We Forget: The Best Of
- 1. "Personal Jesus" Released: October 4, 2004

Lest We Forget: The Best Of is a greatest hits album by American rock band Marilyn Manson. It was released on September 28, 2004, by Interscope Records. The album was conceived by the band's eponymous vocalist as a "farewell compilation", and was originally going to feature a duet with Shirley Manson of Garbage. Upon its completion, neither singer was satisfied with the duet, and it remains unreleased. Instead, the band recorded a cover of Depeche Mode's "Personal Jesus" (1989), which became the only new track on the album and was released as a single. The deluxe version of the album included a bonus DVD containing sixteen music videos, one of which was the previously unreleased uncensored version of the music video for "Saint" (2004).

Lest We Forget: The Best Of received mostly positive reviews from music critics, several of whom complimented its track listing. The compilation's commercial performance exceeded expectations in the United States, where it sold over 78,000 copies in its first week of release and had sold over a million copies as of late 2010. It was also successful internationally, peaking within the top 10 of national record charts in Austria, Germany, Spain, Sweden, Switzerland and the United Kingdom. The band promoted the album with their "Against All Gods Tour".

== Background and release ==
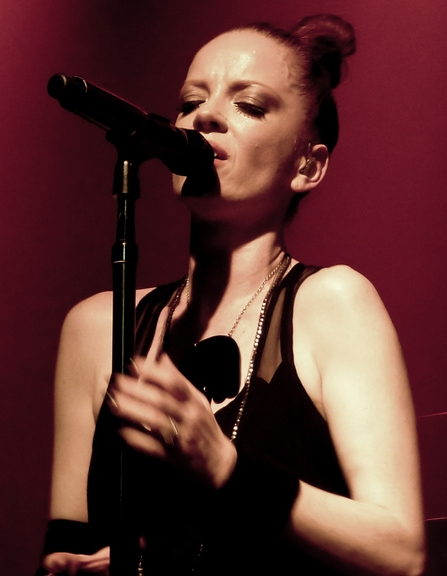
The album was originally going to include a duet with Shirley Manson (pictured in 2012)

The band's eponymous vocalist conceived Lest We Forget: The Best Of as a "farewell compilation", but not a greatest hits album, as "I was never really a top-40 artist." Nevertheless, multiple critics classified the record as a greatest hits album. Prior to the album's release, Manson said that he was going to abandon music in favor of becoming a visual artist and pursuing other non-musical careers; this did not happen. Explaining his frame of mind when he made the album, Manson said, "You get frustrated sometimes when you know that your heart is really buried in your art, and you know more success equals being more mediocre. So you have to redefine success, and you can't compete with people who don't do what you do."

Initially, the album was going to include a duet between the band's frontman and Garbage vocalist Shirley Manson. The track – a cover of The Human League's "Don't You Want Me" (1981) – was recorded after the two artists met at a Yeah Yeah Yeahs concert and enjoyed each other's company. After the cover's completion, Marilyn admitted that he "wasn't in the best frame of mind when I did it". Shirley commented on the cover: "It's really cool but neither of us felt comfortable putting it on our records so I don't know if it will ever come out. I hope it does. Our voices sound fantastic in a very Beauty and the Beast kind of way." Both singers wanted to try to collaborate again sometime in the future, and Manson said that he enjoyed working with Shirley.

After making the decision not to include the duet on Lest We Forget, Marilyn Manson took a break from making music. After receiving fellatio with a rosary wrapped around his penis, Manson had the idea to cover Depeche Mode's "Personal Jesus" (1989) for the album. Manson said that he wanted to cover "Personal Jesus" because he found Depeche Mode's music hypnotic, sexy and inspirational. Manson told MTV that "I thought if I had to write a song, [the lyrics of 'Personal Jesus' are] exactly what I would say. And that's why I picked this song, because I think it takes a little more of an ironic tone when you put it in context with what's going on today." The band's version of "Personal Jesus" is the only new song on the album, and was released as a single.

The cover of Lest We Forget is a watercolor self-portrait by Manson entitled Experience Is the Mistress of Fools. Copies of Lest We Forget contain a booklet with 29 pictures of the band's frontman, while a limited-edition version of the record includes a bonus DVD containing 16 of the band's music videos. The deluxe version also includes the uncensored version of the "Saint" music video, which had not previously been released. MTV reported that the band would embark on the Against All Gods Tour in support of the compilation.

== Critical reception ==
Professional ratings
Review scores
Source	Rating
AllMusic	4/5 stars
Rolling Stone	3.5/5 stars
Spin	B+

In Spin, Chuck Klosterman called the compilation "[f]ucking awesome" and said "there are only about ten compelling metal acts out there right now, and Marilyn Manson is three of them." BBC Music's Richard Banks praised the album's "superb production" and Manson's "genius one-liners", saying "when the knob labelled 'shock-tactics' is already set to 10, one can't help but wonder where [Manson will] go from here." The Chicago Maroon's Matt Zakosek opined "It would be easy to write a pithy, sarcastic review deriding Manson for his over-the-top showmanship-but sometime in the midst of all that devilish preening and posturing, he found the time to make some pretty good music."

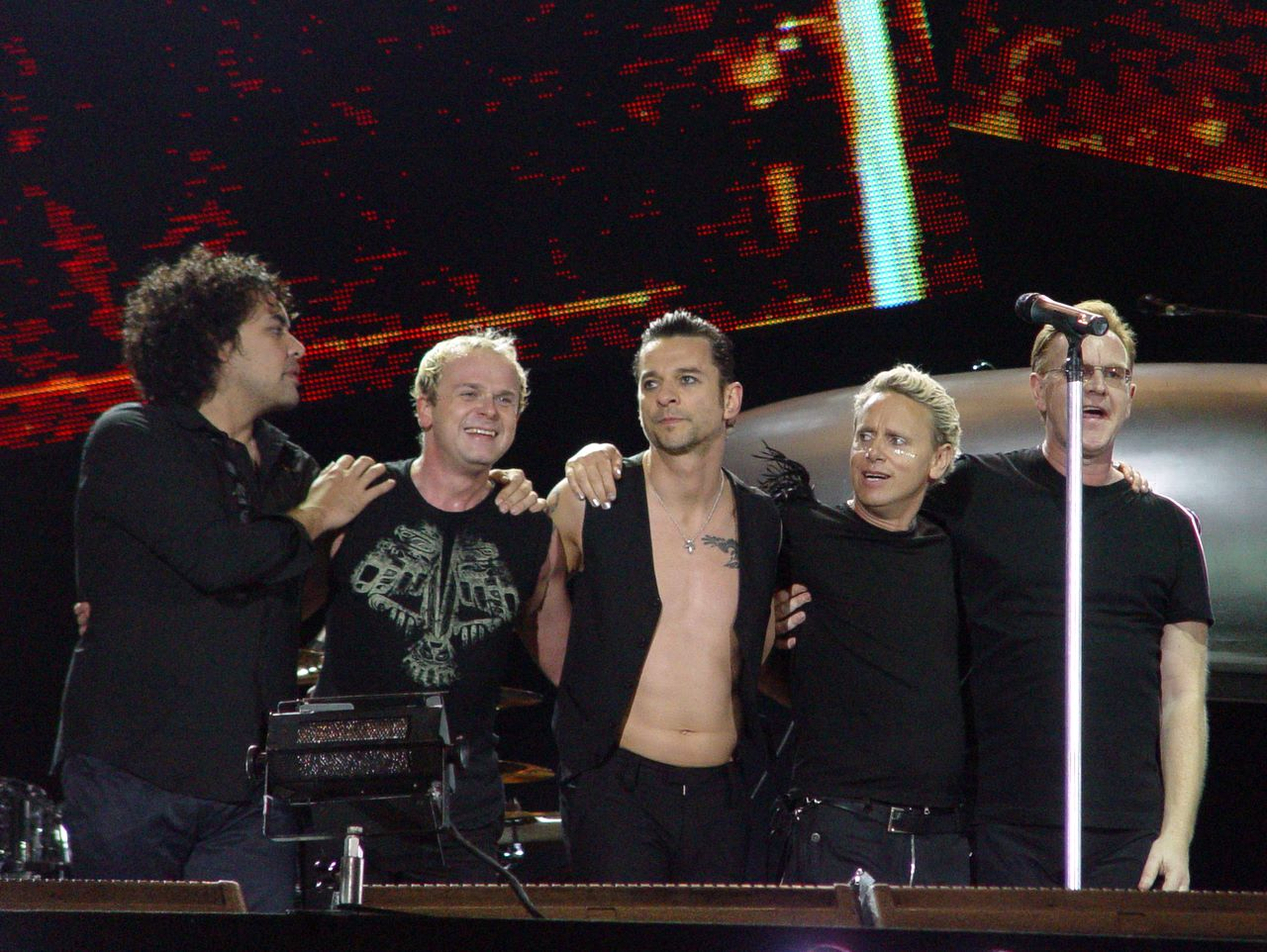
Gavin Baddeley praised the band's cover of "Personal Jesus" (1989) by Depeche Mode (pictured in 2006)

Richard Abowitz of Rolling Stone stated that Lest We Forget "includes all of [Manson's] essential pied-piper calls to alienated suburban youth" and that "Manson's mix of fetish, goth, hedonism and metal still jells". A reviewer for Blabbermouth.net said that the album's track listing features "all of the group's classics". Monica S. Kuebler of Exclaim! said "if you've been holding onto your hard-earned bones waiting for that one essential Marilyn Manson collection (without the filler), you may want to proceed directly to the nearest record store and turn those bones over immediately."

Stephen Thomas Erlewine of AllMusic found the album's omission of "Dope Hat" (1994), "Man That You Fear" (1996) and "I Don't Like the Drugs (But the Drugs Like Me)" (1998) "curious". He added that "Nevertheless, [Lest We Forget] has enough of the hits to make this worthwhile for the casual fans, as well as those listeners who never wanted to admit that [the band's] late-'90s alt-rock radio staples were guilty pleasures." In his book Dissecting Marilyn Manson, Gavin Baddeley opined that "for an album artist like Manson, [greatest hits] collections do fly in the face of the careful structure behind his best work, where the running order is an intrinsic feature of the package." Baddeley felt that, like the band's EP Smells Like Children (1995), "Lest We Forget is redeemed by a clever cover of an eighties pop song, in this case Depeche Mode's 'Personal Jesus'". Writing for PopMatters, Lance Teegarden described the band's cover of "Sweet Dreams (Are Made of This)" (1995), "The Beautiful People" (1996) and "Mobscene" (2003) as "[a] few choice hits on a far too lengthy and same-sounding best-of."

== Commercial performance ==
Industry forecasters predicted the album was on course to debut on the Billboard 200 with first week sales of around 60,000 units. It went on to debut at number nine on the chart, selling 78,715 copies on its first week. It would spend a total of 27 weeks on the chart, and was certified gold by the Recording Industry Association of America in October 2005 for shipments in excess of 500,000 units. As of November 2010, Lest We Forget had sold over a million copies in the United States. It also debuted at number three on the Canadian Albums Chart.

The album was successful internationally as well, particularly in Europe, where it debuted at number five on Billboard's European Top 100 Albums after peaking within the top 10 of national record charts in Austria, Germany, Spain, Sweden, Switzerland and the United Kingdom. It also peaked at number two on the Compilation Albums Chart in France, and was certified gold by the Syndicat National de l'Édition Phonographique (SNEP) for shipments in excess of 100,000 units there. In 2017, IFPI Denmark awarded the record a platinum certification for shipments of over 20,000 units. The set originally peaked at number 20 on Denmark's Hitlisten. Similarly, Lest We Forget received a platinum award from the British Phonographic Industry (BPI) in 2017 for shipments in excess of 300,000 copies there. The album peaked at number four on the UK Albums Chart upon release, and peaked also at the same position on the German Albums Chart, where it was certified gold by the Bundesverband Musikindustrie (BVMI) for shipments of over 100,000 units.

The album peaked at number 15 in both Australia and Japan, and debuted at number nine in New Zealand. It was certified gold by the Australian Recording Industry Association (ARIA) for shipments of over 35,000 copies in that country. It also peaked within the top 20 of the national charts in Belgium, Greece, Italy, Norway, Portugal, and Scotland.

== Track listing ==
All lyrics are written by Marilyn Manson, except "Personal Jesus" by Martin Gore, "Tainted Love" by Ed Cobb, "Sweet Dreams (Are Made of This)" by Annie Lennox and David A. Stewart, "Irresponsible Hate Anthem" by Manson and Twiggy Ramirez, and "Working Class Hero" by John Lennon.

No.	Title	Music	Producer(s)	Length
1.	"The Love Song" (edit; from Holy Wood (In the Shadow of the Valley of Death))	Ramirez; John 5	Dave Sardy; Manson	3:05
2.	"Personal Jesus"	Gore	Manson; Tim Sköld	4:06
3.	"Mobscene" (from The Golden Age of Grotesque)	John 5; Manson	Manson; Sköld; Ben Grosse^{[a]}	3:26
4.	"The Fight Song" (from Holy Wood (In the Shadow of the Valley of Death))	John 5	Sardy; Manson	2:57
5.	"Tainted Love" (from Not Another Teen Movie: Music from the Motion Picture)	Cobb	Manson; Sköld; Grosse^{[b]}	3:20
6.	"The Dope Show" (from Mechanical Animals)	Ramirez	Michael Beinhorn; Manson; Sean Beavan^{[b]}	3:40
7.	"This Is the New Shit" (from The Golden Age of Grotesque)	John 5; Manson; Sköld	Manson; Sköld; Grosse^{[a]}	4:20
8.	"Disposable Teens" (from Holy Wood (In the Shadow of the Valley of Death))	John 5; Ramirez	Sardy; Manson	3:04
9.	"Sweet Dreams (Are Made of This)" (from Smells Like Children)	Lennox; Stewart	Trent Reznor; Manson	4:51
10.	"Lunchbox" (from Portrait of an American Family)	Daisy Berkowitz; Gidget Gein	Manson; Reznor	4:35
11.	"Tourniquet" (extended outro edit; from Antichrist Superstar)	Berkowitz; Ramirez	Reznor; Dave "Rave" Ogilvie	4:44
12.	"Rock Is Dead" (from Mechanical Animals)	Ramirez; Madonna Wayne Gacy	Beinhorn; Manson; Beavan^{[b]}	3:09
13.	"Get Your Gunn" (from Portrait of an American Family)	Berkowitz; Gein	Manson; Reznor	3:18
14.	"The Nobodies" (from Holy Wood (In the Shadow of the Valley of Death))	John 5; Manson	Sardy; Manson	3:35
15.	"Long Hard Road Out of Hell" (from Spawn: The Album)	Ramirez	Manson; Beavan	4:21
16.	"The Beautiful People" (edit; from Antichrist Superstar)	Ramirez	Reznor; Ogilvie; Manson^{[a]}	3:42
17.	"The Reflecting God" (from Antichrist Superstar)	Ramirez; Reznor	Reznor; Ogilvie; Manson^{[a]}	5:36
Total length:				65:58

International bonus tracks
No.	Title	Music	Producer(s)	Length
18.	"Saint" (from The Golden Age of Grotesque)	John 5; Manson; Sköld	Manson; Sköld; Grosse^{[a]}	3:45
19.	"Irresponsible Hate Anthem" (edit) (UK and Japan only; from Antichrist Superstar)	Berkowitz; Gacy	Reznor; Ogilvie; Manson^{[a]}	4:17
20.	"Coma White" (Japan only; from Mechanical Animals)	Ramirez; Gacy; Zim Zum	Beinhorn; Manson; Beavan^{[b]}	5:40
Total length:				79:40

Japanese limited edition bonus disc
No.	Title	Music	Length
1.	"Next Motherfucker" (Remix)	Manson; Berkowitz; Gein	4:47
2.	"The Not-So-Beautiful People"	Ramirez	6:11
3.	"The Horrible People"	Ramirez	5:13
4.	"Tourniquet" (Prosthetic Dance Mix) (Radio Edit)	Berkowitz; Ramirez	4:10
5.	"I Don't Like the Drugs" (Danny Saber Remix)	Ramirez; Zum	5:18
6.	"Working Class Hero"	John Lennon	3:39
7.	"The Fight Song" (Slipknot Remix)	John 5	3:50
8.	"Mobscene" (Sauerkraut Remix – Rammstein Mix)	John 5; Manson	3:16
Total length:			36:24

US and Canadian deluxe edition bonus DVD
No.	Title	Director(s)	Length
1.	"Get Your Gunn"	Rod Chong	3:23
2.	"Lunchbox"	Richard Kern	4:34
3.	"Dope Hat"	Tom Stern	4:17
4.	"Sweet Dreams (Are Made of This)"	Dean Karr	4:39
5.	"The Beautiful People"	Floria Sigismondi	3:46
6.	"Tourniquet"	Sigismondi	4:22
7.	"Man That You Fear"	W.I.Z.	4:26
8.	"Cryptorchid"	E. Elias Merhige	2:44
9.	"Long Hard Road Out of Hell"	Matthew Rolston	4:21
10.	"The Dope Show"	Paul Hunter	3:56
11.	"I Don't Like the Drugs (But the Drugs Like Me)"	Hunter	4:41
12.	"Coma White"	Bayer	4:22
13.	"Rock Is Dead"	Samuel Bayer	3:11
14.	"Disposable Teens"	Bayer	3:06
15.	"The Fight Song"	W.I.Z.	2:53
16.	"The Nobodies"	Manson; Paul Fedor	3:36
17.	"Mobscene"	Manson; Thomas Kloss	3:50
18.	"This Is the New Shit"	Manson; The Cronenweths	4:20
Total length:			70:27

International deluxe edition bonus DVD
No.	Title	Director(s)	Length
1.	"Personal Jesus"	Manson; Nathan "Karma" Cox	3:29
2.	"Saint"	Asia Argento	4:00
3.	"Mobscene"	Manson; Thomas Kloss	3:50
4.	"This Is the New Shit"	Manson; The Cronenweths	4:20
5.	"Disposable Teens"	Bayer	3:06
6.	"The Fight Song"	W.I.Z.	2:53
7.	"The Nobodies"	Manson; Fedor	3:36
8.	"The Dope Show"	Hunter	3:56
9.	"I Don't Like the Drugs (But the Drugs Like Me)"	Hunter	4:41
10.	"Rock Is Dead"	Bayer	3:11
11.	"Coma White"	Bayer	4:22
12.	"Long Hard Road Out of Hell"	Rolston	4:21
13.	"The Beautiful People"	Sigismondi	3:46
14.	"Tourniquet"	Sigismondi	4:22
15.	"Man That You Fear"	W.I.Z.	4:26
16.	"Cryptorchid"	Merhige	2:44
17.	"Sweet Dreams (Are Made of This)"	Karr	4:39
18.	"Dope Hat"	Stern	4:17
19.	"Lunchbox"	Kern	4:34
20.	"Get Your Gunn"	Chong	3:23
Total length:			77:56

Japanese limited edition bonus DVD
No.	Title	Director(s)	Length
8.	"Autopsy"	Manson; Sardy	2:52
9.	"The Dope Show"	Hunter	3:56
10.	"I Don't Like the Drugs (But the Drugs Like Me)"	Hunter	4:41
11.	"Rock Is Dead"	Bayer	3:11
12.	"Coma White"	Bayer	4:22
13.	"Long Hard Road Out of Hell"	Rolston	4:21
14.	"The Beautiful People"	Sigismondi	3:46
15.	"Tourniquet"	Sigismondi	4:22
16.	"Man That You Fear"	W.I.Z.	4:26
17.	"Cryptorchid"	Merhige	2:44
18.	"Sweet Dreams (Are Made of This)"	Karr	4:39
19.	"Dope Hat"	Stern	4:17
20.	"Lunchbox"	Kern	4:34
21.	"Get Your Gunn"	Chong	3:23
Total length:			80:48

Notes

- ^{^a} signifies a co-producer
- ^{^b} signifies an additional producer
- "Mobscene" is stylized as "mOBSCENE".
- "Saint" is stylized as "(s)AINT".
- The bonus DVD contains the following easter eggs: the Autopsy short film, the making of the "Mobscene" video, and the performance version of the "Disposable Teens" video.

== Personnel ==
Credits adapted from the liner notes of the international edition of Lest We Forget: The Best Of.

=== Marilyn Manson ===
- Marilyn Manson – vocals
- Tim Sköld – guitars, bass
- Madonna Wayne Gacy – keyboards
- Ginger Fish – drums

=== Additional musicians ===
- Kelli Ali – additional vocals (track 15)

=== Technical ===
- Dave Sardy – production, mixing (tracks 1, 4, 8, 14)
- Marilyn Manson – production (tracks 1–10, 12–15, 18); co-production (tracks 11, 16, 17)
- Tim Sköld – production (tracks 2, 3, 5, 7, 18)
- Mark "Spike" Stent – mixing (track 2)
- Ben Grosse – co-production (tracks 3, 7, 18); mixing (tracks 3, 5, 7, 18); additional production (track 5)
- Michael Beinhorn – production (tracks 6, 12)
- Sean Beavan – additional production (tracks 6, 12); mixing (tracks 9–11, 13, 15–17); engineering (track 15)
- Tom Lord-Alge – mixing (tracks 6, 12)
- Trent Reznor – production (tracks 9–11, 13, 16, 17); mixing (track 10)
- Alan Moulder – mixing (tracks 10, 13)
- Mark Freegard – mixing (tracks 10, 13)
- Dave "Rave" Ogilvie – production (tracks 11, 16, 17)

=== Artwork ===
- Marilyn Manson – all art, photography, video stills
- Joseph Cultice – photography
- Ross Halfin – photography
- Gottfried Helnwein – photography
- Dean Karr – photography
- Perou – photography
- P. R. Brown – photography
- Floria Sigismondi – photography
- Chad Michael Ward – photography, layout
- Greg Watermann – photography
- Pierre et Gilles – officer portrait
- Liam Ward – production
- Nathan Cox – video stills
- Lukas Ettlin – video stills

== Charts ==
=== Weekly charts ===
Chart (2004)	Peak position
Australian Albums (ARIA)	15
Austrian Albums (Ö3 Austria)	3
Belgian Albums (Ultratop Flanders)	19
Belgian Albums (Ultratop Wallonia)	4
Canadian Albums (Billboard)	3
Czech Albums (ČNS IFPI)	46
Danish Albums (Hitlisten)	20
Dutch Albums (Album Top 100)	41
European Albums (Billboard)	5
Finnish Albums (Suomen virallinen lista)	22
French Compilation Albums (SNEP)	2
German Albums (Offizielle Top 100)	4
Greek Albums (IFPI)	20
Hungarian Albums (MAHASZ)	40
Irish Albums (IRMA)	23
Italian Albums (FIMI)	14
Japanese Albums (Oricon)	15
New Zealand Albums (RMNZ)	9
Norwegian Albums (VG-lista)	16
Polish Albums (ZPAV)	34
Portuguese Albums (AFP)	11
Scottish Albums (OCC)	4
Spanish Albums (PROMUSICAE)	10
Swedish Albums (Sverigetopplistan)	10
Swiss Albums (Schweizer Hitparade)	5
UK Albums (OCC)	4
UK Rock & Metal Albums (OCC)	2
US Billboard 200	9

=== Year-end charts ===
Chart (2004)	Position
Austrian Albums (Ö3 Austria)	62
Belgian Albums (Ultratop Wallonia)	64
German Albums (Offizielle Top 100)	95
Swiss Albums (Schweizer Hitparade)	82
UK Albums (OCC)	154

== Certifications ==
Region	Certification	Certified units/sales
Australia (ARIA)	Gold	35,000^{^}
Denmark (IFPI Danmark)	Platinum	20,000^{‡}
France (SNEP)	Gold	100,000^{*}
Germany (BVMI)	Gold	100,000^{^}
United Kingdom (BPI)	Platinum	300,000^{‡}
United States (RIAA)	Gold	500,000^{^} / 1,000,000
^{*} Sales figures based on certification alone.^{^} Shipments figures based on certification alone.^{‡} Sales+streaming figures based on certification alone.
