= Portrait of an American Family (tour) =

1994–95 concert tour by Marilyn Manson

- Tour by Marilyn Manson
- Associated album: Portrait of an American Family
- Start date: December 27, 1994
- End date: March 11, 1995
- No. of shows: 43

Marilyn Manson concert chronology
- Independent Touring (1990–1994); Portrait of an American Family (1994–1995); Smells Like Children (1995–1996)

The Portrait of an American Family Tour was Marilyn Manson's first headlining tour. It was launched in support of the band's first full-length debut album, Portrait of an American Family, which was released on July 19, 1994, five months before the tour began.

The tour began on December 27, 1994, in Jacksonville, Florida, at Club 5. After this show, the first night of the tour, frontman Marilyn Manson was arrested and taken into custody for violating the Adult Entertainment Code by allegedly donning a strap-on dildo on stage. In spite of this, Manson was freed and the band appeared in Orlando the following night as scheduled.

The tour concluded on March 11, 1995, after the band had played 43 shows. The last show was played in Columbia, South Carolina, at the Alcatrazz venue.

== Lineup ==
- Marilyn Manson - lead vocals
- Daisy Berkowitz - guitars
- Twiggy Ramirez - bass, backing vocals
- Madonna Wayne Gacy - keyboards
- Sara Lee Lucas - drums

== Stage antics ==
During these concerts, the stage was usually arranged with living room décor, not unlike that on the cover of Portrait of an American Family. A table with a lamp was the most commonly seen piece at the shows. The first and last shows included the most memorable incidents of the tour. On December 27, 1994, Manson was misidentified as "jacking off a strap-on dildo" and "urinating on the crowd," resulting in his arrest just one night into the tour. When concluding the concerts with a South Carolina show on March 11, 1995, Manson slipped on a beer bottle, smashing it. Angry, Manson picked up a piece of the bottle and cut his chest "from one side to the other," his first act of notoriously cutting himself on-stage. Closing the performance, the band also ignited drummer Sara Lee Lucas' kit in an attempt to ignite only his bass drum. Claims that Lucas himself was lit aflame have been made by Manson but are disputed by Lucas. (Note: Sara Lee Lucas told MansonWiki in November 2010, "I was never lit on fire, and my kit was never intentionally ignited. My decision to leave the band was made long before that last show but I didn't want to leave in the middle of tour.")

== Tour overview ==
- The tour ran from December 27, 1994, to March 11, 1995. The band completed 44 shows.
- The performances in Carrboro and Columbia were rescheduled to the last two dates of the tour. These performances were originally scheduled for February 16, 1995, and February 18, 1995, respectively.

== Tour dates ==
List of concerts, showing date, city, country, and venue
Date	City	Country	Venue	Opening Act(s)	Attendance	Revenue
December 27, 1994	Jacksonville	United States	Club 5	n/a	—N/a	—N/a
December 28, 1994	Orlando	United States	The Edge	n/a	—N/a	—N/a
December 29, 1994	Tampa	United States	Jannus Landing	n/a	—N/a	—N/a
December 31, 1994	Fort Lauderdale	United States	The Edge	n/a	—N/a	—N/a
January 11, 1995	Houston	United States	Abyss	n/a	—N/a	—N/a
January 13, 1995	Dallas	United States	Trees	n/a	—N/a	—N/a
January 14, 1995	Austin	United States	Backroom	n/a	—N/a	—N/a
January 15, 1995	San Antonio	United States	Showcase	n/a	—N/a	—N/a
January 17, 1995	El Paso	United States	Club 101	n/a	—N/a	—N/a
January 18, 1995	Mesa	United States	Nile	n/a	564 / 564	$5,382
January 19, 1995	Los Angeles	United States	Whiskey	n/a	450 / 450	$5,400
January 21, 1995	San Francisco	United States	Bottom of the Hill	n/a	—N/a	—N/a
January 22, 1995	Palo Alto	United States	The Edge	n/a	—N/a	—N/a
January 24, 1995	Slidell	United States	The Snake Pit	n/a	—N/a	—N/a
January 25, 1995	Vancouver	Canada	Pacific Coliseum	n/a	—N/a	—N/a
January 27, 1995	Salt Lake City	United States	Club Vortex	n/a	—N/a	—N/a
January 28, 1995	Denver	United States	Ogden Theater	n/a	—N/a	—N/a
January 30, 1995	St. Louis	United States	Mississippi Nights	n/a	—N/a	—N/a
February 1, 1995	Minneapolis	United States	First Avenue	n/a	—N/a	—N/a
February 2, 1995	Milwaukee	United States	Shank Hill	n/a	—N/a	—N/a
February 3, 1995	Chicago	United States	Metro	n/a	—N/a	—N/a
February 4, 1995	Detroit	United States	St. Andrews Hall	n/a	—N/a	—N/a
February 5, 1995	Lakewood	United States	Phantasy Theatre	n/a	—N/a	—N/a
February 7, 1995	Toronto	Canada	Opera House	n/a	—N/a	—N/a
February 9, 1995	Cambridge	United States	Middle East Café	n/a	—N/a	—N/a
February 10, 1995	Northampton	United States	Pearl Street Nightclub	n/a	373 / 400	$2,665
February 11, 1995	Providence	United States	Club Babyhead	n/a	—N/a	—N/a
February 12, 1995	New York City	United States	Limelight	n/a	1,613 / 2,000	$19,356
February 14, 1995	Washington, D.C.	United States	9:30 Club	n/a	—N/a	—N/a
February 15, 1995	Hampton	United States	Nsect Club	n/a	430 / 600	$2,036
February 17, 1995	New Orleans	United States	Muddy Waters	n/a	—N/a	—N/a
February 21, 1995	Atlanta	United States	Point	n/a	364 / 364	$3,640
February 22, 1995	Athens	United States	Georgia State Theatre	n/a	—N/a	—N/a
February 24, 1995	Syracuse	United States	Goldstein Auditorium	n/a	—N/a	—N/a
February 25, 1995	Philadelphia	United States	Theater for Living Arts	n/a	—N/a	—N/a
February 27, 1995	Middletown	United States	Sportland Café	n/a	—N/a	—N/a
March 1, 1995	Oldbridge	United States	Birch Hill Night Club	n/a	—N/a	—N/a
March 2, 1995	Lido Beach	United States	Malibu Night Club	n/a	—N/a	—N/a
March 4, 1995	Buffalo	United States	Network	n/a	—N/a	—N/a
March 6, 1995	Albany	United States	QE2	n/a	—N/a	—N/a
March 7, 1995	Lancaster	United States	Chameleon Club	n/a	—N/a	—N/a
March 8, 1995	Cincinnati	United States	Bogarts	n/a	681 / 1,350	$5,793
March 9, 1995	Winston-Salem	United States	Ziggy's Tavern	n/a	—N/a	—N/a
March 10, 1995	Carrboro	United States	Cat's Cradle	n/a	—N/a	—N/a
March 11, 1995	Columbia	United States	Alcatrazz	{Monster Voodoo Machine Isabelle's Gift }	{NA}	
