= Lunch Boxes & Choklit Cows =

Compilation album by Marilyn Manson & The Spooky Kids
- Released: April 20, 2004
- Recorded: January 1990 – November 1993
- Genre: Alternative metal; heavy metal
- Length: 42:44
- Label: Empire MusicWerks
- Producer: Daisy Berkowitz

Original cover

Lunch Boxes & Choklit Cows is a compilation album of previously unreleased demo tracks recorded in the early 1990s by American rock band Marilyn Manson (then known as Marilyn Manson & The Spooky Kids). Original guitarist Scott Putesky ("Daisy Berkowitz") obtained the rights to these and 11 other recordings in a lawsuit against Brian Warner ("Marilyn Manson"), and announced that this release was the first in a planned series of Spooky Kids CDs. Some were from demos and others had never been previously released. These are digitally remastered and, according to Putesky, sound better than the original cassettes because of it.

The album originally came packaged with a "bonus" DVD and slightly different artwork. The original cover had 5 cartoon figures of the band drawn by Marilyn Manson. However, after a lawsuit was filed, Putesky removed the artwork (originally by Warner) and the DVD (which contained footage of Warner & Stephen Bier) and re-released the CD. The re-released cover is the same as the original except the cartoon images are removed.

Copies of the original version with the DVD and artwork can occasionally be found on eBay or Amazon.

== CD track listing ==
1. "Red (in My) Head" – 4:24
  - recorded January 1990 on the Beaver Meat Cleaver Beat demo.
2. "Dune Buggy" – 4:20
  - recorded August 1990 on the Grist-O-Line demo.
3. "Insect Pins" – 5:48
  - recorded February 1993.
4. "Learning to Swim" – 4:11
  - recorded March 1991 on the Lunchbox demo.
5. "Negative Three" – 4:38
  - recorded December 1991 on the After School Special demo.
6. "Meat for a Queen" – 3:02
  - recorded August 1990 on the Grist-O-Line demo.
7. "White Knuckles" – 2:24
  - recorded March 1990 on the Beaver Meat Cleaver Beat demo.
8. "Scaredy Cat" – 3:22
  - recorded November 1993.
9. "Thingmaker" [live] – 4:12
  - recorded July 1992 live in a rehearsal studio. It is originally from the Family Jams demo.
10. "Thrift" [live] – 6:24
  - recorded January 1992 live in a rehearsal studio. It is originally from the Refrigerator demo.

== Bonus DVD listing (out of print) ==
1. "White Knuckles" (Live footage)
2. "Meat for a Queen" (Live footage)
3. "Dune Buggy" (Live footage)
4. "Spooky Gallery" (Still images)

== Credits ==
- Marilyn Manson — voices
- Daisy Berkowitz — guitar, liner notes
- Madonna Wayne Gacy — keyboards
- Gidget Gein — bass
- Sara Lee Lucas — drums
- Paul Klein – executive producer
- Mike Fuller – mastering
- Rama Barwick – project coordinator
- Sharon Slade – project coordinator
- Aldo Venturacci – art direction
- Sean Weeks – design
