= Get Your Gunn =

Single by Marilyn Manson

from the album Portrait of an American Family
- B-side: "Revelation #9"
- Released: June 9, 1994
- Recorded: Criteria Studios, Miami; The Village Recorder, West Los Angeles
- Genre: Gothic rock; hard rock
- Length: 3:18
- Label: Nothing; Interscope
- Songwriters: Marilyn Manson; Daisy Berkowitz; Gidget Gein
- Producers: Trent Reznor; Manson

Marilyn Manson singles chronology
"Get Your Gunn" (1994)	"Lunchbox" (1995)

Music video
- "Get Your Gunn" on YouTube

"Get Your Gunn" is a song by American rock band Marilyn Manson. It was released on June 9, 1994 as the band's debut single and is from their debut studio album, Portrait of an American Family (1994). The song was written by the band's eponymous vocalist along with original guitarist and bassist Daisy Berkowitz and Gidget Gein, respectively, and was produced by Manson with Trent Reznor. "Get Your Gunn" was inspired by the murder of abortion provider David Gunn by an anti-abortion activist, an event which angered Manson. The song also took influence from Manson's lifelong fascination with abortion and an interaction he had with an anti-abortion protester.

A gothic rock and hard rock song, the track received a mostly positive response from music critics, who described it as both nightmarish and well-produced, while Manson garnered acclaim for his vocal performance. The song features saxophone played by Sugarsmack vocalist Hope Nicholls, and an audio sample of the televised suicide of R. Budd Dwyer. According to Berkowitz, the writing of the song marked a change of direction for Manson, after which he began to write more politically-charged songs. "Get Your Gunn" was blamed by the political right in the United States for the Columbine High School massacre, and multiple critics have deemed it one of the most controversial songs of all time. Its music video was directed by Rod Chong and released in 1994. The clip garnered acclaim from critics, and the song reached number 11 on the Canadian Hot 100, three years after its initial release.

== Background and release ==
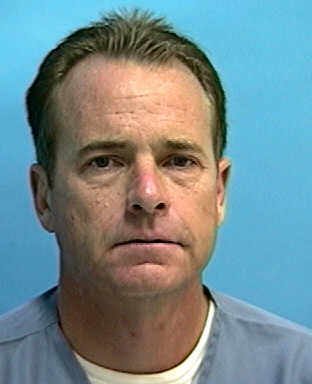
Michael Frederick Griffin (pictured) murdered Dr. David Gunn; the murder inspired "Get Your Gunn".

OB-GYN, David Gunn was shot and killed in 1993 at an anti-abortion protest by Michael Frederick Griffin, a Christian fundamentalist. At his trial, Griffin claimed to have been manipulated into killing Gunn by John Burt, a pro-life leader and former member of the Ku Klux Klan. Gunn's death was, in the words of Slate's Dahlia Lithwick, "the first targeted killing of an abortion doctor in America". The murder inspired "Get Your Gunn", hence the spelling of the song's title. In 1999, Manson wrote in Rolling Stone that Gunn's death "was the ultimate hypocrisy I witnessed growing up: that these people killed someone in the name of being 'prolife.'"

Manson has said that the murder "almost made me laugh, but it made me mad. When you think about it, it's so fucking backwards, despite the whole Christian belief of love thy enemy and all that." When writing the track, Manson also drew inspiration from his longtime fascination with abortion as well as an elderly man he saw at an anti-abortion protest. Manson remembered: "I had this thing that I bought at a magic shop in Florida that shot cotton-wad fire things out of the palm of your hand, and I drove up to him one day and said 'The devil's got a message for you' and I shot the fireball at him and he ran." Commenting on both "Get Your Gunn" and "Lunchbox", Manson noted that "The somewhat positive messages of these songs are usually the ones that sensationalists misinterpret as promoting the very things I am decrying."

When deciding the direction of Portrait of an American Family, Manson and band-mate Daisy Berkowitz decided that it would comment on what they saw as the hypocrisy of the U.S. media. Discussing "Get Your Gunn" with Noisey in 2014, Berkowitz said: "When we started out [Manson's lyricism] was more psychedelic. It was weirdness. We played up weirdness rather than anything socially pointed. We got more social and political as things went on. Like with our song, 'Get Your Gunn' that definitely wasn't something that we started out doing."

Manson has said that "Get Your Gunn" is his favorite song from Portrait of an American Family. Manson told the Sun-Sentinel that "What's great is that ['Get Your Gunn'] is the most uncommercial track, the most politically incorrect." "Snake Eyes and Sissies" was originally planned to be the band's debut single, but "Get Your Gunn" was released instead on June 9, 1994. The single featured "Get Your Gunn" and "Misery Machine", another song from Portrait of an American Family, as well as two other tracks: "Mother Inferior Got Her Gunn" and "Revelation #9". The titles of the two latter songs are puns based on songs from the White Album. The child pictured on the sleeve for the disc is Wes Brown, the half-brother of Twiggy Ramirez.

== Composition ==
"Get Your Gunn"
An 18-second sample of "Get Your Gunn", a gothic rock and hard rock song.

"Get Your Gunn" is a gothic rock and hard rock song with a length of three minutes and eighteen seconds. The song's lyrics were written by the band's eponymous vocalist, while its music was written by Daisy Berkowitz and Gidget Gein; the track was produced by Manson and Trent Reznor. The aforementioned murder is reflected in its lyrics "God damn your righteous hand/ I eat innocent meat/ The housewife I will beat/ The prolife I will kill". Alec Chillingworth of Metal Hammer found the song's "wacky, stomping hook" reminiscent of the music of Jack Off Jill.

Joseph Schafer of Stereogum described Manson's vocals on the track as raspy and unpolished, as well as reminiscent of Maynard James Keenan's vocals on Tool's EP Opiate (1992). Schafer saw similarities between the riff in the song's verses and the music of Helmet, and thought that the snare drums and cymbals in the song's chorus evoke the work of artists signed to Wax Trax! Records, particularly Ministry. The chorus of "Get Your Gunn" is "Goddamn/oh Lord/ goddamn". The bridge of "Get Your Gunn" includes audio from the televised press conference where American politician R. Budd Dwyer shot himself, including the sound of the gunshot that killed him. When Manson sampled the audio of Dwyer's suicide, Richard Patrick of Filter heard the sample and was excited by it; Manson believes that this interaction inspired Patrick to write "Hey Man Nice Shot" (1995), a song about Dwyer's suicide.

Additional saxophone playing on "Get Your Gunn" is provided by Sugarsmack vocalist Hope Nicholls. The track features Manson singing "Pseudo-morals work real well, On the talk shows for the weak, But your selective judgements, And goodguy badges, Don't mean a fuck to me". The Sun-Sentinel's Sandra Schulman said that the song features "searing lyrics on the mixed message morals of authority."

== Critical reception and controversy ==
Schafer of Stereogum ranked the song eighth on his list of "The 10 Best Marilyn Manson Songs", saying that "While the remainder of Portrait Of An American Family comes across as undercooked, even for an early-'90s alt-metal album, 'Get Your Gunn' feels lean and vitriolic. Sadly, Manson seldom matched its aggression again." Schafer also praised Manson's "charming" vocal performance on the song. Jim Louvau of the Phoenix New Times named it one of his favorite Marilyn Manson songs alongside "Long Hard Road Out of Hell" (1997). Bloody Disgusting's Brad Miska opined that "In retrospect, its level of cheese is of legend, but in 1994 Portrait was some dark and weird shit (see 'Cake and Sodomy', 'My Monkey', 'Get Your Gun' [sic], etc.)." Gigwise said that the song has "brutal" lyrics which "set the precedent for the rest of the band's career".

Writing for Metal Hammer, Alec Chillingworth said that "'Lunchbox', 'Get Your Gunn', 'Wrapped In Plastic' and 'Dope Hat' are the catchiest [songs on the album]". In a piece they wrote for Clash, the Astroid Boys deemed "Get Your Gunn" one of their "personal favourites" from Marilyn Manson's catalogue and praised its lyrics for capturing the hypocrisy in Gunn's murder. Jon Wiederhorn of Loudwire praised the track for "driving the record" and helping the band to retain the loyal fan-base that it had cultivated prior to the release of Portrait of an American Family.

Sandra Schulman of the Sun-Sentinel said that the song is "Horrifyingly good, loopy music, with discordant riffs that crawl under your skin and stay there. The soundtrack to every nightmare you've ever had." Dazed's Daisy Jones described "Get Your Gunn", Nirvana's "Rape Me" (1993), The Prodigy's "Smack My Bitch Up" (1997) and Lady Gaga and R. Kelly's "Do What U Want" (2013) as "tracks that provoked, thrilled and shocked their listeners." Stephen Thomas Erlewine of AllMusic wrote that "Even though it wasn't one of the best tracks on Portrait of an American Family, 'Get Your Gunn' was a solid track that was a fairly good choice for a single." Conversely, The Chicago Maroon's Matt Zakosek called the track "weary Goth-rock junk" and criticized its inclusion on the greatest hits album Lest We Forget: The Best Of (2004).

In America, the far-right blamed the Columbine High School massacre on "Get Your Gunn"; Manson responded to this claim by saying that "In my work I examine the America we live in, and I've always tried to show people that the devil we blame our atrocities on is really just each one of us." Due to its association with the Columbine massacre, Daisy Jones of Dazed placed "Get Your Gunn" on her list of the most controversial songs of all time, though she deemed the association absurd. Jones wrote that the song created an amount of controversy comparable to that sparked by "Fuck tha Police" (1988) by N.W.A and "Blurred Lines" (2013) by Robin Thicke. Similarly, a PRS for Music survey conducted in 2010 revealed that the British public considered "Get Your Gunn" the eighth most controversial song of all time, while Schafer of Stereogum noted in 2015 that it was "still one of the most controversial songs in Manson’s repertoire". Gigwise ranked the track fifteenth on their list of "The 20 Most Controversial Songs of All Time".

== Music video ==
The music video, directed by Rod Chong, features Manson performing in an abandoned house. It is one of four Marilyn Manson music videos where the band's frontman has eyebrows. The video was accepted by MTV. Although it was rarely aired by the network, it was shown on Headbangers Ball. Manson told The New York Times that MTV wanted to censor the use of the word "goddamn" in the track's chorus, commenting "They wanted the word 'God' bleeped, which is assbackward because 'damn' is the cussword." The clip focuses on Manson's eyes, and features imagery of light coming in through windows.

Simon Young of Team Rock called the "Get Your Gunn" video one of the band's "classic videos". Sandra Shulman of the Sun-Sentinel called the video "a searing and tight piece of work". Dan Epstein of Revolver wrote that "Marilyn Manson might be best known as a musician, but he's also made his mark as a video artist, simultaneously captivating and disgusting viewers since 1994's 'Get Your Gunn' clip all the way up to this year's nympho-nuns-with-guns visual 'We Know Where You Fucking Live'." MTV's Rob Mancini viewed the video for "Get Your Gunn" as one of Marilyn Manson's "early nuggets".

== In popular culture ==
"Get Your Gunn" appeared on the soundtracks for the films S.F.W. (1994) and Strange Days (1995).

== Track listing ==
All songs written by Manson, Berkowitz and Gein, except 2 by Manson, Berkowitz, Gein and Madonna Wayne Gacy, and 4 by Manson and Gacy.

- U.S. Promotional CD (PRCD57812)
1. "Get Your Gunn" (Highschool Drop-outs)
- CD single (Australia, Europe and United States: IND–95902 · Canada: CINTD–95902 · Japan: MVCT–12009)
1. "Get Your Gunn" (Album Version) – 3:18
2. "Misery Machine" (Album Version) – 4:44
3. "Mother Inferior Got Her Gunn" (Remix by Trent Reznor) – 5:39
4. "Revelation #9" – 12:57

== Personnel ==
Credits adapted from the liner notes of the "Get Your Gunn" single.

Marilyn Manson

- Marilyn Manson – lyrics, production, sleeve concept and band logo
- Daisy Berkowitz – music
- Gidget Gein – music
- Madonna Wayne Gacy – brass, loops
- Sara Lee Lucas – drums

Additional musicians and technical personnel

- Sean Beavan – brass, programming, digital editing, production and mixing assistance
- Charlie Clouser – drum programming and digital editing
- Barry Goldberg – engineering assistance
- Jeremy Staska – engineering assistance
- Roli Mosimann – engineering and original production
- Alan Moulder – engineering, production and mixing assistance
- Hope Nicholls – saxophone
- Robin Perrine – photography
- Trent Reznor – executive producer, mixing
- Gary Talpas – package design
- Chris Vrenna – percussion, programming, engineering assistance

== Charts ==
Chart (1997–1999)	Peak position
Australia (ARIA)	97
Canada (Billboard)	11
UK Rock & Metal (OCC)	5

== See also ==
- List of songs recorded by Marilyn Manson
- Marilyn Manson–Columbine High School massacre controversy
