= Lunchbox (song) =

Single by Marilyn Manson

from the album Portrait of an American Family
- B-side: "Down in the Park"
- Released: February 6, 1995
- Genre: Gothic rock; alternative metal
- Length: 4:32
- Label: Nothing; Interscope
- Songwriters: Marilyn Manson; Daisy Berkowitz; Gidget Gein
- Producers: Trent Reznor; Marilyn Manson

Marilyn Manson singles chronology
"Get Your Gunn" (1994)	"Lunchbox" (1995)	"Sweet Dreams (Are Made of This)" (1995)

Music video
- "Lunchbox" on YouTube

"Lunchbox" is a song by the American rock band Marilyn Manson. It was released as the second single from their debut studio album, Portrait of an American Family (1994). A gothic rock and alternative metal song that features elements of death metal, industrial and punk rock, "Lunchbox" was written by the band's eponymous vocalist, Daisy Berkowitz, and Gidget Gein, and produced by Manson with Trent Reznor. According to Berkowitz, the track was written as the frontman's plea to be left alone; it was also inspired by a time when Manson defended himself from bullies with a Kiss lunchbox. The track features elements of "Fire" (1968) performed by Arthur Brown, a musician who influenced the band.

"Lunchbox" received predominantly positive reviews from critics, with the writers and readers of Metal Hammer separately deeming it one of the best metal songs of the 1990s; several critics also praised Berkowitz's musicianship on the track. The band's decision to sample "Fire" helped to revive interest in Brown. A music video for the song was directed by experimental filmmaker Richard Kern and released in 1995. It depicts a young Manson played by a then-six year-old Robert Pierce, son of Rambler member Richard Pierce. In the clip, the young Manson is tormented by bullies before becoming a rock star; another part of the video shows the band at a roller rink. The video received a mixed response from critics, and "Lunchbox" charted at number five on the Canadian Hot 100.

== Background and release ==
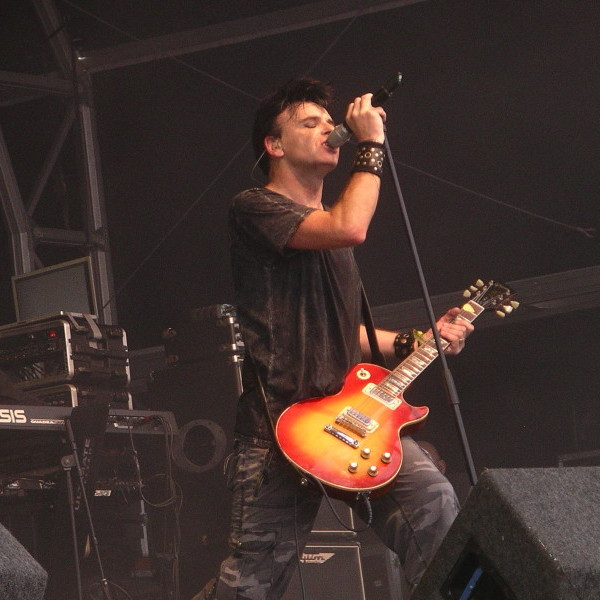
The "Lunchbox" single features a cover of "Down in the Park" by Gary Numan.

According to Daisy Berkowitz, "Lunchbox" was written as "tacit plea—for the frontman to be left alone with his thoughts in the back of a swank tour bus." Its lyrics were inspired by Manson's use of a metal Kiss lunch box to defend himself against school bullies, an incident which prompted the school to ban all metal lunch boxes. The band performed the track during their audition for Sony Records' head of A&R Richard Griffin. Berkowitz recalled that Griffin "personally rejected us within minutes, saying he liked the show and the idea but 'didn't like the singer.'" Instead, the label signed Pearl Jam. "Lunchbox" became a "fan favorite" of the band's live sets; Manson said that during performances of the song, "I regularly set a metal lunchbox on fire, took off all my clothes and danced around it, trying to exorcise its demons." The band were signed to Trent Reznor's Nothing Records in 1993.

"Lunchbox" was released as a single on February 6, 1995 alongside three remixes of the song created by Nine Inch Nails keyboardist Charlie Clouser – "Next Motherfucker", "Brown Bag" and "Metal" – as well as a censored version of the A-side called "Lunchbox (Highschool Drop-Outs)", and a cover of "Down in the Park" (1979) by Gary Numan. In his book Marilyn Manson, Kurt B. Reighley said that the "air of detachment and repressed xenophobia" present in "Down in the Park" made the song fit well with the band's own work. Both Numan and Reighley noted that the band's cover of the song significantly reworked the original track.

While recording the B-sides for the single, Manson invited a deaf groupie to the studio and asked her to strip naked. He then covered her with hot dogs, pig's feet, and salami. Madonna Wayne Gacy started having sex with her and shouted "I'm going to come in your useless ear canal." As she showered off, Twiggy Ramirez and Manson urinated on her. In his autobiography, The Long Hard Road Out of Hell (1998), Manson commented on the incident: "I think she, too, found it to be art and was having a good time."

== Composition ==
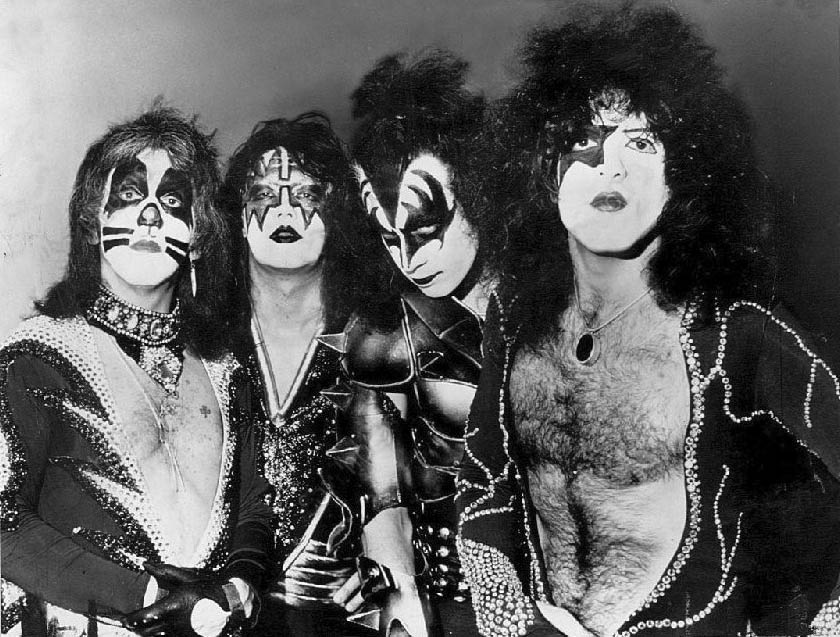
"Lunchbox" was inspired by an incident where Manson defended himself from bullies with a Kiss (pictured) lunchbox.

"Lunchbox"
A 27-second sample of "Lunchbox", a gothic rock and alternative metal song with elements of death metal, industrial music, and punk rock.

"Lunchbox" is a gothic rock and alternative metal song, with a length of four minutes and thirty-two seconds. The track was written by the band's eponymous vocalist, Daisy Berkowitz and Gidget Gein, and was produced by Manson with Trent Reznor. It combines a danceable industrial beat, death metal guitars and punk rock influences, while containing the lyrics "I got my lunchbox and I'm armed real well/I wanna grow up /wanna be a big rock-n-roll star/big time rock-n-roll star/so no one fucks with me."

Manson discussed the meaning of "Lunchbox" in a 1999 article in Rolling Stone, saying: "Some journalists have interpreted it as a song about guns. Ironically, the song is about being picked on and fighting back with my Kiss lunch box, which I used as a weapon on the playground. In 1979, metal lunch boxes were banned because they were considered dangerous weapons in the hands of delinquents." Commenting on both "Lunchbox" and "Get Your Gunn", Manson added that "The somewhat positive messages of these songs are usually the ones that sensationalists misinterpret as promoting the very things I am decrying." Berkowitz told the Sun-Sentinel that the song's narrative fits with Manson's self-image as an "outcast who stands up to abuse yet, in the process, catches hell from authorities."

Writing for the Houston Press, Kristy Loye said that the song features a "level of cultural examination" which separates it from the macho and heteronormative heavy metal music of the 1980s. "Lunchbox" contains elements of "Fire" (1968) performed by Arthur Brown, a pioneer of progressive rock whose work influenced the band. The track features the sound of small children saying profanities, an effect which Matt Zakosek of The Chicago Maroon noted was later used on Outkast's album Speakerboxxx/The Love Below (2003). Metal Hammer's Alec Chillingworth felt that the song's "wacky, stomping hook" is similar to the music of Jack Off Jill.

== Critical reception ==
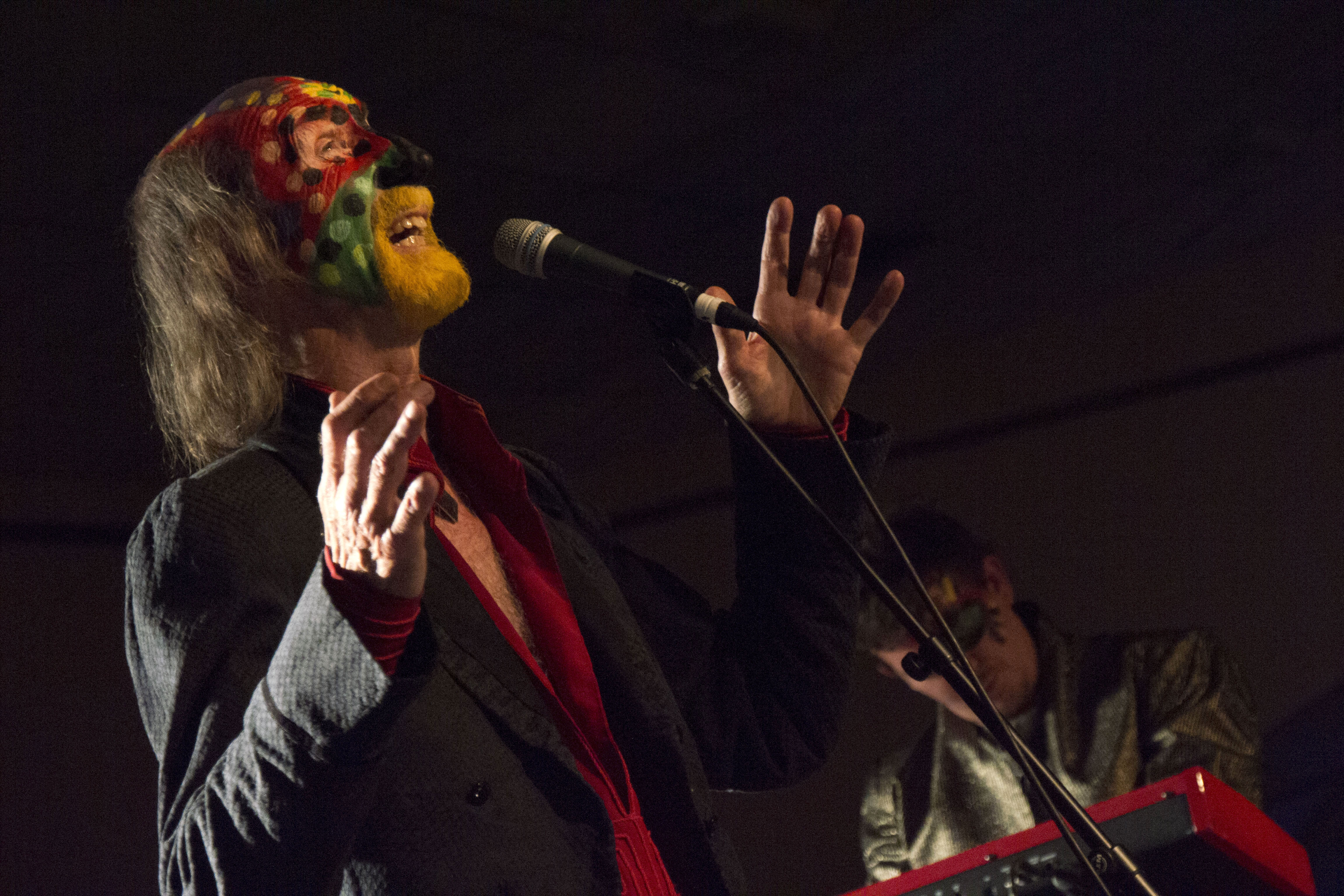
"Lunchbox" helped to revive interest in Arthur Brown.

Metal Hammer ranked the song 66 on their list of "The 100 best metal songs of the 90s", saying that "The seeds of Manson becoming Public Enemy Number One in the United States were being sown on his 1994 debut Portrait Of An American Family, and despite this not being the most terrifying song in his repertoire you just can’t deny the power of the chorus." Metal Hammer's readers voted the track the seventeenth greatest metal song of the 1990s. The Miami Herald's Howard Cohen said that Berkowitz's "musicianship, songwriting, and industrial guitar...gave early Marilyn Manson its musical credibility on songs like 'Lunchbox,' 'My Monkey,' 'Dope Hat,' and 'Cake and Sodomy.'" In Exclaim!, Monica S. Kuebler called the track one of the band's "indispensable goth club classics from the mid-'90s".

Similarly, Ben Crandell of The Washington Post wrote that "While the band drew attention for its theatrical excesses, it prospered in large part because of the musical credibility provided by the gleaming, industrial-gear shredding of [Berkowitz's] guitar on early Manson songs such as 'Lunchbox,' 'Dope Hat' and their hit cover of the Eurythmics' 'Sweet Dreams (Are Made of This).'" Bloody Disgusting's Brad Miska said that the "dirty, edgy, and uninhibited" song "was part of my musical awakening and self-discovery as a teenager." He added that after hearing the track, "Marilyn Manson quickly became my favorite band." Kristy Loye of the Houston Press called the track "fresh" and praised it for bringing a "level of shock and interrogation of acceptable performance hadn’t been seen since the glam/punk heyday of '70s-era Iggy Pop and David Bowie."

Stephen Thomas Erlewine of AllMusic wrote that "With its relentless but danceable industrial beat and death metal guitars, 'Lunchbox' was one of the standouts on Marilyn Manson's debut album, Portrait of an American Family." For MetalSucks, Axl Rosenberg called "Lunchbox" and "Tourniquet" (1996) some of "Manson's best early material", while Loudwire's John Hill said that, on the track, Berkowitz was "responsible for some of the most iconic guitar work from the band". Josh Sisk of Noisey praised "Lunchbox" despite not being a fan of the band. The Chicago Maroon's Matt Zakosek deemed the song's use of children spewing profanities "kind of ridiculous" and "a lame stab at shock value". Kory Grow of Rolling Stone Australia noted that Marilyn Manson and The Prodigy sampling "Fire" helped revive interest in Arthur Brown, as did covers of "Fire" by The Who and The Ventures; Grow called this renewed interest "long overdue".

== Music video ==
Directed by experimental filmmaker Richard Kern and based on a concept created by Manson and Kern, the song's music video stars Robert Pierce, who was six years old at the time, as a young Manson; Pierce also performed on tour with the band and on the band's song "My Monkey". In the clip, Pierce is bullied on his way to a roller rink as he carries his metal lunchbox. He then vows revenge and gives himself a Mohawk hairstyle, before growing up to become a rock star. The band is shown obstructing roller skaters, and a child puts makeup on Manson. At the end of the video, a Rambo lunchbox is destroyed with fire; metal Rambo lunchboxes were the last metal lunchboxes to be mass-produced. Shooting the video caused Manson to recall negative memories, as Pierce physically resembled a bully he had encountered as a child. The video was released in 1995.

Metal Hammer said that "the video of a super skinny, no make-up Mazza is so '90s it's still brilliant to watch today." Simon Young of Team Rock called it one of the band's "classic videos". Writing for Bloody Disgusting, Jonathan Barkan said "I don’t know what this video is supposed to try and convey....I feel like this was trying to be edgy but it comes off more as crying for attention."

== Formats and track listings ==
All songs written by Manson, Berkowitz and Gein, except "Down in the Park" by Gary Numan.

- CD single (Canada, Mexico and the United States: 95806–2/INTDM–95806 · Europe: IND–95806 · Japan: MVCT–12010)
1. "Lunchbox" – 4:34
2. "Next Motherfucker" (Remix) – 4:48
3. "Down in the Park" (Gary Numan cover) – 5:01
4. "Brown Bag" (Remix) – 6:19
5. "Metal" (Remix) – 5:25
6. "Lunchbox (Highschool Drop-Outs)" – 4:35
- U.S. promotional CD (PRCD–5961)
1. "Lunchbox (Highschool Drop-Outs)" – 4:39
2. "Lunchbox" – 4:34
3. "Down in the Park" – 5:01

== Personnel ==
Credits adapted from the liner notes of the "Lunchbox" single.

Marilyn Manson

- Marilyn Manson – lyrics, production, sleeve design and calligraphy
- Daisy Berkowitz – music, electric guitar
- Gidget Gein – music, bass guitar
- Madonna Wayne Gacy – electronics
- Sara Lee Lucas – drums

Additional musicians and technical personnel

- Sean Beavan – programming, digital editing, production and mixing assistance
- Charlie Clouser – drum programming and digital editing
- Richard Kern – photography
- Roli Mosimann – engineering and original production
- Alan Moulder – engineering, production and mixing assistance
- Twiggy Ramirez – fur-covered bass; Moog bass ("Down in the Park" only)
- Trent Reznor – production
- Gary Talpas – package design
- Chris Vrenna – programming, engineering assistance

== Charts ==
Chart (1997–99)	Peak position
Australia (ARIA)	81
Canada (Billboard)	5
UK Rock & Metal (Official Charts)	5
