= Dope Hat =

- Cover insert

Promotional single by Marilyn Manson

from the album Portrait of an American Family
- Released: 1995
- Genre: Alternative metal
- Length: 4:18
- Label: Nothing
- Songwriter(s): Marilyn Manson; Daisy Berkowitz; Gidget Gein; Madonna Wayne Gacy
- Producer(s): Trent Reznor

Audio sample
- "Dope Hat": file; help

"Dope Hat" is a song by American rock band Marilyn Manson. It was released as the promotional single from their debut album, Portrait of an American Family. It was first recorded for a demo tape released in 1992, entitled The Family Jams.

The song was remixed on the band's 1995 EP, Smells Like Children, under the titles of "Diary of a Dope Fiend" (reference to the Diary of a Drug Fiend by Aleister Crowley) (a re-record) and "Dance of the Dope Hats" (a faster and more synthesized version). The music video was inspired by Willy Wonka & the Chocolate Factory, particularly the Wondrous Boat Ride scene.

== Composition ==
Sandra Schulman of the Sun-Sentinel wrote that the song is about "the false lullaby of drugs and its dealers." Metal Hammer's Alec Chillingworth felt that the song's "wacky, stomping hook" is similar to the music of Jack Off Jill.

== Critical reception ==
Sandra Schulman of the Sun-Sentinel said that the song is "Horrifyingly good, loopy music, with discordant riffs that crawl under your skin and stay there. The soundtrack to every nightmare you've ever had." In his review of Portrait of an American Family, Stephen Thomas Erlewine of AllMusic said "Beneath all the camp shock, there are signs of [Manson's] unerring eye for genuine outrage and musical talent, particularly on the trio of 'Cake and Sodomy,' 'Lunchbox,' and 'Dope Hat.'" The Miami Herald's Howard Cohen said that Berkowitz's "musicianship, songwriting, and industrial guitar...gave early Marilyn Manson its musical credibility on songs like 'Lunchbox,' 'My Monkey,' 'Dope Hat,' and 'Cake and Sodomy.'" Similarly, Ben Crandell of The Washington Post wrote that "While the band drew attention for its theatrical excesses, it prospered in large part because of the musical credibility provided by the gleaming, industrial-gear shredding of [Berkowitz's] guitar on early Manson songs such as 'Lunchbox,' 'Dope Hat' and their hit cover of the Eurythmics' 'Sweet Dreams (Are Made of This).'" Alec Chillingworth of Metal Hammer felt that "Dope Hat' and "Get Your Gunn" are among the catchiest songs on the album.

== Music video ==
The music video, directed by Tom Stern, features the band riding a boat through a psychedelic tunnel on a river of blood directly inspired by the 1971 film Willy Wonka & the Chocolate Factory, one of Manson's favorite films. The boat is carrying the band members, young children and the Oompa Loompas from the aforementioned movie. Robert Iler appeared in the video as one of the children at the age of 10. CGI effects in the video were created by Xavier Guerin. The video also includes bizarre images in the background, such as a hand breaking an egg and blood coming out of it, a fish coming from the inside of a melon cut in half, etc. The video depicts a sort of "evil" and drug-induced Willy Wonka's boat ride. The video came out in 1995. The video also features references to Hoodoo, a villainous character from the classic children's television series Lidsville.

=== Critical reception ===
Aly Semigran of Billboard put the video on her list of "The 10 Best Music Videos Inspired By a Movie", alongside the videos for Madonna's "Material Girl" (1985) and Tupac Shakur's "California Love" (1996).

== Track listing ==
U.S. promotional CD single

1. "Dope Hat" (LP version) – 4:18
2. "Diary of a Dope Fiend" (EP version) – 5:57
3. "Dance of the Dope Hats" (Remix) – 4:37
