= Smells Like Children =

EP by Marilyn Manson
- Released: October 24, 1995
- Recorded: 1994–1995
- Studios: Nothing Studios, New Orleans
- Genre: Industrial metal
- Length: 54:43
- Labels: Nothing; Interscope
- Producer: Trent Reznor

Marilyn Manson chronology
Portrait of an American Family (1994)	Smells Like Children (1995)	Antichrist Superstar (1996)

Singles from Smells Like Children
- 1. "Sweet Dreams (Are Made of This)" Released: June 22, 1995

Smells Like Children is the first EP by American rock band Marilyn Manson. It was released on October 24, 1995, by Nothing and Interscope Records. Produced by Trent Reznor of Nine Inch Nails, it represents an era of the band full of drugs, abuses, tours, sound experiments, and references to the Child Catcher, a villain from the 1968 musical film Chitty Chitty Bang Bang.

The EP was initially proposed to strictly be a remix single for "Dope Hat", but various contributions by engineer and Skinny Puppy producer Dave Ogilvie, Nine Inch Nails live keyboardist Charlie Clouser, and new material by the band resulted in an eclectic and unusual combination of material. All the ideas and tracks for the EP were created and composed throughout the touring cycle in support of the band's 1994 debut Portrait of an American Family, and was the first Marilyn Manson work to feature longtime members Twiggy Ramirez on bass and Ginger Fish on drums.

Smells Like Children was certified platinum by the Recording Industry Association of America, and was spearheaded by its sole single, a cover of "Sweet Dreams (Are Made of This)", originally written and performed by Eurythmics. The song's music video became a staple on MTV and helped to establish the band in the mainstream.

== Background and development ==
After the conclusion of the Portrait of an American Family Tour, the band undertook the opening slot position for Danzig's 4p Tour from March 24, 1995, until May 16, 1996.

== Themes ==
The band's frontman has discussed his thoughts in retrospect on Smells Like Children within his autobiography The Long Hard Road Out of Hell (1998):

It was a perfect preface to an album about abuse: sexual abuse, domestic abuse, drug abuse, psychological abuse. Midway through the record, we [initially] included one of the taped confessions we had gathered, from a girl who molested her seven-year-old male cousin. It underscored the subplot of the album, about the most common target of abuse: innocence. I've always liked the Peter Pan idea of being a kid in mind if not in body, and Smells Like Children was supposed to be a record for someone who's no longer a child, someone who, like myself, wants their innocence back now that they're corrupted enough to appreciate it. [...] What began as a very disturbing record had become a record that disturbed only me.

Manson has considered the release to be "An album that looks like an album for children that is not for children"; in fact, on the outer rim of the CD label the printed words "Keep this and all drugs away from small children" are visible.

== Music ==
=== Songs ===
I thought "Rock N Roll Nigger" was a song that I could really relate to and our fans could relate to about being an outsider. I also thought that nobody else really, in our era of music, had the courage to do a cover of a song like that because, you know, they would get in trouble for the title but this song isn't about racism. It's about standing up for yourself.

— Marilyn Manson on his decision to cover Patti Smith's "Rock N Roll Nigger".

A number of cover songs are included in the track listing, most famous of which is the band's cover of Eurythmics' "Sweet Dreams (Are Made of This)", which thrust the band into the mainstream. The other covers on the album are the Patti Smith song "Rock N Roll Nigger" and Screamin' Jay Hawkins' "I Put a Spell on You", with the latter later featured on the soundtrack for David Lynch's 1997 psychological thriller film Lost Highway.

A recorded telephone conversation between Manson's mother and grandmother, titled "May Cause Discoloration of the Urine or Feces", is sometimes included on early bootlegs under the title "Procardia", in a heavily modified version which is actually a fan-made track, and not an actual track from either pressing—this version contains the original track in the left channel, and an extract from Raggedy Ann in the right. The Smells Like Children version was previously featured as part of the sound scape "Revelation #9", released on the single for "Get Your Gunn". Some of these bootlegs may also contain bonus tracks, including a demo for the song "My Monkey" from Portrait of an American Family, and another track called "Choklit Factory" taken from the bands' Spooky Kids-era.

"Diary of a Dope Fiend"
Album version, as it appeared on Smells Like Children. The title alludes to occult author Aleister Crowley's novel Diary of a Drug Fiend.

The album alludes to famous occult author Aleister Crowley, particularly in the "Dope Hat" re-recording "Diary of a Dope Fiend" after the Crowley novel Diary of a Drug Fiend. The "Frankie" referred to in "Fuck Frankie" is Frankie Proia, Manson's tour manager at the time who embezzled $20,000 from the band during their tour for their previous release, Portrait of an American Family. Wiggins recorded an acoustic rendition of the song "Cake and Sodomy" under the title "White Trash". Manson stated the irony of having Wiggins "strum and twang a redneck version" of the song was "perfect for its message, since [it] critiques southern Christian white trash".

The "One-Legged..." referred to in "Dancing with the One-Legged..." was "a battered doll of Huggy Bear, the pimp from the 1970s cop thriller television series Starsky and Hutch, which was missing a leg". Manson explains, "Inside that empty plastic socket was where we hid our drugs throughout the Tony Wiggins tour. Whenever we ingested the contents of that extra orifice, we referred to it in code as 'dancing with the one-legged pimp'". The untitled sixteenth track contains a slower, more ominous remix of "Shitty Chicken Gang Bang" and, approximately 6 minutes in, an unusual audio experiment sometimes referred to as "Poop Games".

=== Samples ===
"The only solace was that through some unfortunate error someone at the record pressing plant made several thousand copies of our original version of the album, thinking it was the new one. Without even listening to them, the record company sent them out as promotional copies to radio stations and journalists before realizing their mistake. Now, they are available to anyone who wants to hear them on the Internet. Though someone at the label actually accused me of plotting it, I wish I was that resourceful. God, however irrelevant he may be to me, works in mysterious ways."

— Marilyn Manson discussing the state of the removed tracks

Early promotional copies of Smells Like Children featured unauthorized samples from the films Willy Wonka & the Chocolate Factory and Chitty Chitty Bang Bang, as well as other sound bites considered "too extreme", therefore resulting in the track listing to be re-edited accordingly for public release, much to Manson's chagrin. Interscope was not interested in buying licenses to use the film samples and demanded written affidavits from the participants in the sound bites, certifying their consent to be recorded. The removed clips were the original opening track, "Abuse, Part 1 (There is Pain Involved)", featuring the voices of Manson and Wiggins as they attempted to calm down a masochistic girl when things got out-of-control, and "Abuse, Part 2 (Confessions)", featuring an interview with a teenage girl who confesses to molesting her 7-year-old male cousin. These were replaced by "The Hands of Small Children" and "May Cause Discoloration of the Urine or Feces", respectively.

The tracks "Sympathy for the Parents" and "Dancing with the One-Legged..." are distorted sound clips taken from an appearance by Manson, Ramirez and Gacy on The Phil Donahue Show. The episode discussed the dangers of moshing at concerts. The excerpt used in "Sympathy for the Parents" features Ramirez responding to a question about the attire worn by the band members by playing a cassette tape recording of "Scabs, Guns and Peanut Butter", before Manson's answer to the same question.

== Singles ==
Marilyn Manson in the music video for "Sweet Dreams (Are Made of This)"

Smells Like Children produced only one single, a cover version of Eurythmics' 1983 hit "Sweet Dreams (Are Made of This)".

Manson often drew musical inspiration from his dreams, but the idea to cover this song came from his first experimentation with LSD at a house party, according to his autobiography. He says that he hallucinated a "slower, meaner" version of the dance hit playing, sung in his voice. He also stated that Nothing did not want to release this as a single. Daisy Berkowitz stated "When the song was released it divided people – they loved it or hated it. This was good. Just like us, as a band, if loved – you're loved. If hated, people that hate you talk about you even more so". The label wanted to release their cover of Screamin' Jay Hawkins' "I Put a Spell on You", which, according to Manson, "was far too dark, sprawling and esoteric, even for some of our fans."

The music video for Manson's cover was a gateway to popularity for the band, eventually being nominated at the MTV Video Music Awards for Best Rock Video, and contains several clips of Manson and band members in what appears to be an old, decrepit asylum whilst wearing a variety of strange costumes. The overall video was shot with unusual filters: this was one of the first videos shot with director Dean Karr's initial vision intact, not based solely on whatever ideas the band had come up with prior. In between these clips are a number of surreal shots of Manson wearing a wedding gown, Manson wandering around an abandoned street in a tutu, birds fluttering around him and leaving dropping on his body, and footage of him riding a pig wearing a cowboy hat whilst covered with mud which Manson rides during the song's climax.

== Critical reception ==
Professional ratings
Review scores
Source	Rating
AllMusic	3/5 stars
Entertainment Weekly	(D)
The Village Voice	D+

Upon its release, the album met with mixed to negative reviews from music critics. AllMusic gave it a mixed review and said: "Where the full-length debut showed sparks of character and invention beneath industrial metal sludge, Smells Like Children is a smartly crafted horror show, filled with vulgarity, ugliness, goth freaks, and sideshow scares. Manson wisely chose to heighten his cartoonish personality with the EP. Most of the record is devoted to spoken words and samples, all designed to push the outrage buttons of middle America. Musically, it may not amount to much—it's goth-metal-industrial, as good as the 'Dope Hat,' 'Lunchbox,' and 'Cake and Sodomy' trilogy that distinguished the debut—but as a sonic sculpture, as an objet d'art, it's effective and wickedly fascinating. It's exactly what Brian Warner needed to do to establish Marilyn Manson as America's bogeyman for the late '90s."

In his review for The Village Voice, music critic Robert Christgau defined Smells Like Children as an "Unmitigated consumer fraud—a mess of instrumentals, covers, and remixes designed to exploit its well-publicized tour, genderfuck cover art, titillating titles, and parental warning label. The lyrics to 'Shitty Chicken Gang Bang' are nonexistent, those to 'Everlasting Cocksucker' incomprehensible. Only 'Fuck Frankie,' a spoken-word number in which a female feigning sexual ecstasy reveals that it isn't 'Fool Frankie' or 'Fire Frankie' or 'Fast Frankie' or for that matter 'Fist Frankie,' delivers what it promises. It's easily the best thing on the record." Tony Scherman of Entertainment Weekly also gave the release a negative review and called it "an artlessly assembled excuse for an album, these minor-league White Zombie wannabes throw together pointless remixes, irritating skits, and lame covers of songs by Eurythmics, Screamin' Jay Hawkins, and Patti Smith. Co-producer Trent Reznor should hang his head in shame." Exclaim!'s Liisa Ladouceur ranked Smells Like Children fourth on her list of the essential Marilyn Manson albums. Ladouceur wrote that "[this] collection...was poorly received on release but proves a much more interesting document of the [band's] early years than 1994's debut album, Portrait of an American Family."

=== Controversy ===
[Smells Like Children is the] dirtiest, nastiest porno record directed at children that has ever hit the market.

— C. Delores Tucker

On May 30, 1996, the co-directors of the conservative advocacy group Empower America (now known as FreedomWorks), Republican Secretary of Education William Bennett and Democrat Senator Joseph Lieberman, organized a bipartisan press conference, along with Secretary of Pennsylvania State C. Delores Tucker, wherein they admonished the record industry for selling "prepackaged, shrink-wrapped nihilism." Bennett claimed that "nothing less is at stake than civilization" against lyrics which Lieberman decried, "celebrate some of the most antisocial and immoral behaviors imaginable." Tucker concurred noting that, "these companies have the blood of children on their hands ... We protect owls. We protect whales. We must protect children."

The moral crusaders largely targeted rap music and five music conglomerates: Time Warner, Bertelsmann Music Group, PolyGram, Thorn EMI, and Sony Music—leaving out MCA (which had recently acquired Interscope at the time)—an absence MTV noted as "strange", leading them to postulate "that perhaps Tucker or Bennett own some stock in the company". Nevertheless, the group did not forget to bring up Marilyn Manson and Smells Like Children. Empower America also took the opportunity to announce, at the press conference, they were launching a $25,000 radio ad campaign to collect petitions from listeners who want the record companies to "stop spreading this vicious, vulgar music."

== Track listing ==
No.	Title	Length
1.	"The Hands of Small Children"	1:35
2.	"Diary of a Dope Fiend" ("Dope Hat" re-record)	5:56
3.	"Shitty Chicken Gang Bang"	1:19
4.	"Kiddie Grinder (Remix)" ("Organ Grinder" remix)	4:23
5.	"Sympathy for the Parents"	1:01
6.	"Sweet Dreams (Are Made of This)" (Eurythmics cover)	4:53
7.	"Everlasting Cocksucker (Remix)" ("Cake and Sodomy" remix)	5:14
8.	"Fuck Frankie"	1:48
9.	"I Put a Spell on You" (Screamin' Jay Hawkins cover)	3:37
10.	"May Cause Discoloration of the Urine or Feces"	3:59
11.	"Scabs, Guns and Peanut Butter"	1:01
12.	"Dance of the Dope Hats (Remix)" ("Dope Hat" remix, contains samples from "Cake and Sodomy")	4:40
13.	"White Trash (Remixed by Tony F. Wiggins)" (uses lyrics from "Cake and Sodomy")	2:48
14.	"Dancing with the One-Legged..."	0:46
15.	"Rock 'n' Roll Nigger" (Patti Smith cover)	3:32
16.	"Untitled" (first part is an alternative version of "Shitty Chicken Gang Bang")	8:20
Total length:		54:43

Promo version
No.	Title	Length
1.	"Abuse, Part 1 (There Is Pain Involved)" (later replaced by "The Hands of Small Children")	1:33
2.	"Diary of a Dope Fiend"	5:57
3.	"Shitty Chicken Gang Bang"	1:16
4.	"Kiddie Grinder (Remix)" (contains samples from Chitty Chitty Bang Bang)	4:46
5.	"Sympathy for the Parents"	1:01
6.	"Sweet Dreams (Are Made of This)"	4:54
7.	"Everlasting Cocksucker (Remix)" (contains samples from Willy Wonka & the Chocolate Factory)	5:08
8.	"Fuck Frankie"	1:47
9.	"I Put a Spell on You"	3:38
10.	"Abuse, Part 2 (Confessions)" (later replaced by "May Cause Discoloration of the Urine or Feces")	2:43
11.	"Scabs, Guns and Peanut Butter" (channels reversed)	1:01
12.	"Dance of the Dope Hats (Remix)"	4:40
13.	"White Trash (Remixed by Tony F. Wiggins)"	2:48
14.	"Dancing with the One-Legged..."	0:46
15.	"Rock 'n' Roll Nigger"	3:33
16.	"Untitled"	8:17
Total length:		53:48

== Personnel ==
Marilyn Manson

- Marilyn Manson – vocals
- Twiggy Ramirez – bass
- Daisy Berkowitz – guitars
- Madonna Wayne Gacy – keyboards, synthesizers, loops, programming
- Ginger Fish – drums

Production

- Marilyn Manson – production, concept
- Chris Vrenna – programming
- Sean Beavan – engineering
- Tony F. Wiggins – vocals
- Frankie Proia – management
- Joseph Cultice – photography
- Gary Talpas – art direction, package design

== Charts and certifications ==
=== Weekly charts ===
Chart (1995–1996)	Peak position
Australian Albums (ARIA)	73
Canadian Albums (RPM)	42
US Billboard 200	31

=== Year-end charts ===
Chart (1996)	Position
US Billboard 200	130

=== Certifications ===
Certifications for Smells Like Children
Region	Certification	Certified units/sales
Canada (Music Canada)	Platinum	100,000^{^}
United Kingdom (BPI)	Gold	100,000^{^}
United States (RIAA)	Platinum	1,000,000^{^}
^{^} Shipments figures based on certification alone.

=== Singles ===
Single	Chart (1996)	Peak position
"Sweet Dreams (Are Made of This)"	Hungary (Mahasz)	7
"Sweet Dreams (Are Made of This)"	Billboard Modern Rock Tracks	26
"Sweet Dreams (Are Made of This)"	U.S. Billboard Mainstream Rock Tracks	31
