= Sara Lee Lucas =

American drummer

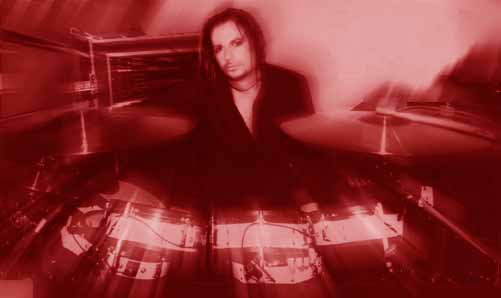

Background information
- Also known as: Sara Lee Lucas; S.L. Lucas; Lucas
- Born: Frederick Streithorst Jr.
- Origin: Fort Lauderdale, Florida, U.S.
- Genres: Industrial metal, alternative metal, breakbeat, electronica
- Occupation: Drummer
- Years active: 1991-present
- Labels: Datastream nothing Interscope

Frederick Streithorst Jr., better known by his stage name Sara Lee Lucas, is an American musician and the original drummer for Marilyn Manson. He has also performed as "S.L. Lucas" or simply "Lucas". His stage name is derived from serial killer Henry Lee Lucas and baked goods company Sara Lee. After leaving Marilyn Manson in 1995, he performed in many other industrial bands using tribal style of drumming and experimental digital percussion. He also became active with his mastering company, Masterlab.

== Career ==
=== 1983–1990 ===
==== 333 Lunatic Lane, Black Janet, India Loves You ====
Prior to joining Marilyn Manson, he drummed for local South Florida bands "333 Lunatic Lane", "Black Janet" and "India Loves You", the latter with future Manson bandmate Scott Putesky a.k.a. Daisy Berkowitz.

=== 1991–1995 ===
==== Marilyn Manson and the Spooky Kids, Marilyn Manson ====
With Marilyn Manson, Lucas wrote and played on the album Portrait of an American Family (produced by Trent Reznor and Alan Moulder). He also contributed material and is credited in Smells Like Children and Antichrist Superstar. He toured on both the Self Destruct Tour along with Nine Inch Nails, and Marilyn Manson's headlining club tour in 1995. He quit the band following the tour, and, along with the other former Spooky Kids, sued Brian Warner for his unpaid royalties, settling in 1998.

=== 1996 – Present ===
==== Electroshock Therapy, Nocturne, Kuzmark ====
Lucas and partner Trace started an industrial/electronic/breakbeat project called Electro-Shock Therapy in 1996. With a catalog of over a thousand tracks and a contract with Red Entertainment, they continue to write and record tracks as well as soundscapes.

Electroshock Therapy, featuring the platinum certified Trace and Marilyn Manson founding member Sara lee Lucas recently celebrated the 3,000,000th MySpace play and Fourth visit to the Top-Twenty National Chart position since debuting earlier this year in May, by announcing a new Composing & Licensing push to bring to market the over 1,000 song library the group currently has in inventory. Electroshock Therapy is a luxurious formula blend of arena performance rock and technologically driven electronica, industrial, break-beat and trip-hop elements...fused with a healthy blend of exotic world beats and musical tastes...this new dynamic powerhouse takes listeners on an emotional theme park of exceptionally crafted musical and visual creations.

Lucas performed with Dallas, Texas-based rock band Nocturne on their short headlining tour in 2002.

In November of that year, Trace and Lucas were asked to perform with Orlando, Florida industrial performance-based band Ambionica, and Lucas later started a recording project called Kuzmark with the singer. They performed a series of shows in South Florida in 2003.

==== Masterlab ====
Lucas and Trace founded their company Masterlab in 1996. Head of the CD and DVD manufacturing and graphic design departments of the Orlando, Florida audio mastering facility, Lucas and Trace mastered several platinum tracks for artists including Khia, Mary J. Blige, Mandy Moore, 69 Boyz, and Robert Palmer.

Trace and Marilyn Manson Co-Founder Sara Lee Lucas, acting in advisory roles to SoundScapes, furthermore, believe the all-star executive and producer team assembled for the Program shall greatly assist our efforts to deliver a breakthrough Series. Masterlab shall provide complete content organization, mastering and optimization for the all format content delivery and media manufacturing efforts.

In January 2009, it was reported that Marilyn Manson wanted to contact Lucas, in regards to the former's lawsuits involving Stephen Bier (ex-Manson keyboardist Madonna Wayne Gacy).

In addition to his work with Masterlab, Lucas continued to perform.
