= Gidget Gein =

American musician (1969–2008)

Background information
- Born: Bradley Mark Stewart; September 11, 1969; Hollywood, Florida, U.S.
- Died: October 8, 2008 (aged 39) Burbank, California, U.S.
- Genre: Alternative metal
- Occupations: Musician, artist
- Instruments: Bass guitar, guitar
- Years active: 1989–2008
- Labels: Nothing, Interscope
- Formerly of: Marilyn Manson; Dali Gaggers
- Website: Gidget Gein's official site (archived)

Bradley Mark Stewart (September 11, 1969 – October 8, 2008), known by his stage name Gidget Gein, was an American musician and artist. He was the second bassist and co-founder of the rock band Marilyn Manson. His stage name is a combination of fictional character Gidget and serial killer Ed Gein.

== Early life ==
Gein was born and raised in Hollywood, Florida. His mother was a Roman Catholic school teacher and his father was a police officer. His parents divorced when he was the age of 3 and his mother remarried a few years later to a carny and a birthday clown who became Gein's stepfather. "He was like Krusty the Clown," describes Gein. "And he was a rampant alcoholic, so after these birthday parties, he would hang out with the parents and drink. Then he'd come home, reeking and smoking cigars in his clown makeup, drunk off his ass, busting shit, being nasty. That was a weekly occurrence."

As a child he attended Catholic school and his favorite movies were Willy Wonka & the Chocolate Factory and The Texas Chain Saw Massacre.

== Career ==
Stewart joined the band Marilyn Manson & the Spooky Kids in 1989 as bass guitarist. The band eventually gained the attention of Trent Reznor, who signed them to his label Nothing Records. As the band became more famous after dropping the "Spooky Kids" title in 1992, Gein's heroin addiction grew. In October 1993, Reznor agreed to rework the production on Marilyn Manson's album, taking them and their tapes to The Record Plant in Los Angeles. On Christmas Eve of 1993, Gein was hospitalized after overdosing on heroin. While still hospitalized, he received a message from Marilyn Manson's lawyer via FedEx that he was fired due to his drug use. Gein was replaced by his roadie Jeordie White. He was credited as a member of the band on their debut album, Portrait of an American Family, but all of the bass heard on the album was actually performed by Gein.

After being fired from Marilyn Manson, he formed a group called Gidget Gein and the Dali Gaggers. The group featured vocalist Anthony Taboada, a.k.a. Alistarr Liddell, and guitarist Al B. Romano which highlighted displays of degenerate art, ideas, and post-punk styled songwriting. The group released the album Just AdNauseam in 1998. Before the release of the Dali Gaggers' second album, Confessions of a Spooky Kid in 1999, Gein relapsed and began shooting heroin. He headed back to Florida to kick his drug addiction and began work for the south Florida medical examiner as a "bag boy", spending years retrieving and cleaning up after the deceased. His macabre experiences at the coroner's office have been documented in various international magazines and spurred a script and early production of a motion picture entitled Bag Boy which never saw a release.

During the production of Marilyn Manson's The Golden Age of Grotesque album in 2003, Gein and Manson reunited to collaborate in a music video independently produced for the song "Saint" (stylized as "(s)AINT"). Directed by Asia Argento and containing scenes of violence, nudity, masturbation, drug-use and self-mutilation, Interscope considered it "too graphic" and refused to be associated with the project, although it was later included on international editions of the Lest We Forget: The Best Of bonus DVD; some countries blurred scenes out to include whilst others like the United Kingdom included the fully unedited version. NME referred to the video as "one of the most explicit music videos ever made", and both Time and SF Weekly included it on their respective lists of the 'Most Controversial Music Videos'.

Gein returned to Los Angeles in 2004. During the final few years of his life, he was very active in various film, art and musical projects. He acted in several independent films including The Three Trials, The Devil's Muse and others. During this final period, he was at the forefront of the "UnPop" and "GaGa" style art and fashion movements. His mixed media art was typically billed under his trademark GOLLYWOOD brand and featured various themes of blaxploitation, transgender people, and grotesque depictions of pop culture icons. Examples of his art can still be found at the Hyaena Art Gallery in Burbank, Ca.

== Death ==
On October 8, 2008, Stewart died of a heroin overdose at the apartment he shared with his roommate Shaun Ross, bassist for the Los Angeles punk band Excel, in Downtown Los Angeles, California. His body was discovered on October 9, 2008. Shortly before his death, Gein had completed his third attempt at getting sober from heroin addiction and was reportedly recording an album with producer Dave Jerden.

== Aftermath ==
On December 8, 2008, a memorial benefit for Gein was held at the Dragonfly in Los Angeles. It featured Gein's art and an array of friends and fans performing in his honor. The guest list included Ego Plum, Kim Fowley, Jessicka, Ramzi Abed, Lenora Claire, Hollie Stevens and drag queens Squeaky Blonde and Fade-Dra. Funds raised from the gathering were used to purchase a memorial plaque in Gein's honor that was placed at Hollywood Forever Cemetery. Gein's foster sister retains possession of his remains in Florida.

A commemorative tribute was filmed on October 9, 2010, at the Spooky Empire horror convention based in Orlando, Florida. Participants included Al B. Romano CC Manded from Murder Museum on lead vocals, Parris Mathew and others. The 9-part compendium was filmed by the Film Director/Artist/Musician Cynosure and is respectively owned by Cynosure Enterprises. The film closes with Gein's memorial plaque, embellished with the slogan "Luv is GG".

== Discography ==
=== With Marilyn Manson and the Spooky Kids ===
- Big Black Bus (1990)
- Grist-O-Line (1990)
- Lunchbox (1991)
- After School Special (1991)
- Live As Hell (1992)
- The Family Jams (1992)
- Refrigerator (1993)
- Lunch Boxes & Choklit Cows (2004)

=== With Marilyn Manson ===
- Portrait of an American Family (1994)

=== With the Dali Gaggers ===
- Confessions of a Spooky Kid (Just AdNauseam) (1998)

=== Solo ===
- Suspension of Disbelief (2007)
- Law of Diminishing Return (2007)
- Rig Demos (2007)

== Filmography ==
Year	Title	Role	Notes
1999	God Is in the T.V.	Himself	Direct-to-video release
2000	Demystifying the Devil: Biography Marilyn Manson	Himself	
2003	"(s)AINT" music video	Himself	Directed by Asia Argento
2006	The Three Trials	Diner	
2007	The Devil's Muse (2007)	Detective Jeffrey Mourir	
2008	In a Spiral State	Avi	
