= Madonna Wayne Gacy =

American keyboardist

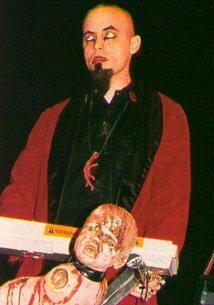
- Bier onstage in 1995

Background information
- Also known as: Pogo
- Genres: Industrial metal; industrial rock
- Occupation: Musician
- Instrument: Keyboards
- Years active: 1989–present
- Formerly of: Marilyn Manson

Stephen Bier, formerly known by his stage name Madonna Wayne Gacy and by the nickname Pogo, is an American musician who was the keyboard player for Marilyn Manson from 1989 to 2007. His stage name came from the names of the singer Madonna and the serial killer John Wayne Gacy.

== Career ==
Bier joined Marilyn Manson in late 1989 as a live prop actor after Zsa Zsa Speck left the band. Bier is responsible for much of the Qabalistic and numerological meanings behind Manson's albums. He did not contribute to Manson's album Eat Me, Drink Me, having been replaced by Chris Vrenna.

In 2007, Bier filed a lawsuit against Manson for unpaid "partnership proceeds". Bier claims Manson spent the band's earnings on luxurious items and "devised a campaign to drive Bier out of the band and rob him of his entitlement". Manson filed a counter suit against Bier, accusing him of breach of contract. The lawsuit was settled for $380,000, $175,000 of which was paid out by Manson while the rest was ordered to be paid by Stephen Bier's former business managers.

== Discography ==
- Portrait of an American Family (Marilyn Manson, 1994)
- "The Hearts Filthy Lesson" single (US) (David Bowie, 1995) (uncredited)
- Smells Like Children (Marilyn Manson, 1995)
- Antichrist Superstar (Marilyn Manson, 1996)
- Remix & Repent (Marilyn Manson, 1997)
- Lost Highway Soundtrack - "Apple of Sodom" (uncredited, 1997)
- Mechanical Animals (Marilyn Manson, 1998)
- Dead Man on Campus Soundtrack (Marilyn Manson's cover of David Bowie's "Golden Years", 1999)
- Detroit Rock City (Marilyn Manson's cover of AC/DC's "Highway to Hell", 1999)
- The Last Tour on Earth (Marilyn Manson, 1999)
- Holy Wood (In the Shadow of the Valley of Death) (Marilyn Manson, 2000)
- Guns, God and Government (Marilyn Manson, 2000)
- The Golden Age of Grotesque (Marilyn Manson, 2003)
- Lest We Forget: The Best Of (Marilyn Manson, 2004)
- Lost & Found (Marilyn Manson, 2008)

== Filmography ==
- God is in the T.V (1999).
- Marilyn Manson: Dead to the World (1998)
- Marilyn Manson: Coma White (1999)
- Doppelherz (2003)
- Speed Dragon (2013) (Bones)
