= Dead to the World Tour =

1996–97 concert tour by Marilyn Manson

- Tour by Marilyn Manson
- Associated album: Antichrist Superstar
- Start date: September 5, 1996
- End date: September 16, 1997
- Legs: 8
- No. of shows: 175

Marilyn Manson concert chronology
- Smells Like Children (1995–1996); Dead to the World (1996–1997) Ozzfest Tour (1997); Mechanical Animals (1998–1999)

The Dead to the World Tour was a worldwide concert tour by the American rock band Marilyn Manson. Staged in support of their 1996 album Antichrist Superstar, the tour visited theaters, nightclubs, arenas and stadiums from 1996 to 1997. The Dead to the World Tour was the band's fifth tour, counting their early independent touring and their supporting roles for Nine Inch Nails' Self Destruct Tour and Danzig's Danzig 4p Tour. It is also their first tour to span over several legs, eight in total, that alternated between multiple venues both in North America and internationally.

The band was on the tour from September 5, 1996 until September 16, 1997, playing a total of 175 shows throughout Europe, Japan, Oceania, and North and South America. The tour marked a period for the band wherein they reached new heights of attention and notoriety in news outlets for the unapologetic anti-Christianity of the band's outspoken frontman, Marilyn Manson, the proliferation of allegations and rumors of the band's purported stage antics, numerous bomb threats, successful and failed attempts by concert venues to block their shows, resistance from local and state legislators, legal challenge, and protests from religious and civic groups such as the American Family Association and Oklahomans for Children and Families. Multiple school administrations across the country also threatened expulsion for any student attending one of the band's concerts or wearing apparel "inspired" by, or directly sold by, the band.

Nearly every North American venue the band visited was picketed by religious organizations. Opponents of the band based their protests on exaggerated, unfounded claims of onstage drug abuse, bestiality, and satanic rituals – namely animal and human sacrifice – and claims that the band frequently engaged in homosexual intercourse with one another, and that underage concert attendees were violently raped by other audience members.

The tour was managed by major record label Interscope Records. Its name is derived from the song "Dried Up, Tied and Dead to the World". Select backstage and archival footage from the Dead to the World Tour was chronicled in the concert film: Dead to the World on VHS in 1997 and released in 1998. The tour was also chronicled by the band's frontman in his tour diary which he published in his autobiography The Long Hard Road Out of Hell.

== Background ==
They are called superpredators. They are not here yet, but they are predicted to be a plague upon the United States in the next decade. They are not some creature from outer space; they are our own children.

— The Tampa Tribune, May 21, 1996

In 1996, America had grown culturally divided. The Baby Boomer generation aligned itself with the political Right during the Presidency of Ronald Reagan. In 1992, former US presidential nominee and paleoconservative Pat Buchanan declared a "war for the soul of America" against what he deemed moral degradation being promoted by the ideals of political Liberalism. A year later, Reagan-era Secretary of Education William Bennett feared contemporary pop culture had become a corrupt influence that turned American youth away from traditional values and co-founded the Conservative advocacy group Empower America (now known as FreedomWorks). Similar to the non-partisan Parents Music Resource Center (PMRC), Empower America sought to discourage what it deemed objectionable entertainment by passing legislation to punish the media companies promoting them. The Presidency of Bill Clinton was also under pressure from the United States House of Representatives following the successful takeover of the House by Speaker Newt Gingrich in 1994. To appease these factions, Clinton embraced a third way-style of governance that syncretized the socially conservative policies of the Republican Party into his own.

In 1996 Bennett coauthored Body Count: Moral Poverty—and how to Win America's War Against Crime and Drugs alongside criminologist John J. DiIulio Jr. and former US drug czar John P. Walters. The authors argued the pop culture of the 1990s had turned the Millennial cohort (especially children of color) into an ultraviolent breed of amoral "superpredators"—"fatherless, Godless, and jobless" youths that are "radically impulsive, [and] brutally remorseless". Due to their sheer numbers (40 million below the age of 10—the largest in decades) the authors warned this cohort would soon unleash an epidemic of crime that dwarf the 1994 spike in the juvenile violent crime rate (despite its precipitous decline prior to the book's publication). DiIulio predicted America would soon face, "elementary school youngsters who pack guns instead of lunches" with "absolutely no respect for human life and no sense of the future." To combat this perceived imminent onslaught of nihilistic youth, the book prescribed expanding the war on drugs, increasing the legal drinking age, imposing stricter prison sentencing, reinstating school prayer, and impeding youth access to entertainment with violent and/or sexual content.

The book sparked panic and provoked the introduction of H.R.3565 - Violent Youth Predator Act of 1996 before the 104th United States Congress by Rep. Bill McCollum of Florida and cosponsored by 19 Republicans and 2 Democrats. Clinton pledged during his 1996 re-election campaign to tackle the threat with a law and order-style crackdown on teen behaviour dubbed "Order and Discipline."

This volatile climate coincided with the recording of Antichrist Superstar. Buoyed by the positive reception to their 1995 Eurythmics cover "Sweet Dreams (Are Made of This)" the band hunkered down with mentor and producer Trent Reznor in Reznor's recording studio in New Orleans and began work on their sophomore album.

== Promotion and Nights of Nothing ==
None of us wanted to play this Nothing Records showcase in the first place, and now I've inadvertently injured my drummer, nailing him with a microphone stand and landing him in the hospital. We had wanted to do a Marilyn Manson show to kick off the tour for Antichrist Superstar, but this turned into some sort of strange ego trip which I'm sure was just to make us look foolish. I'm going to go to sleep now and pretend like this didn't happen. This wasn't the beginning of the tour, it was one last favor.

— Marilyn Manson

Following the conclusion of the recording sessions for Antichrist Superstar, acrimony between the band, Reznor, and Reznor's vanity label, Nothing Records, was at its peak. The band grudgingly agreed to fulfill their contractual obligation to promote the record, a little over a month prior to release, by performing on the second evening of the final leg of Nine Inch Nails' Self Destruct Tour at the Irving Plaza, on September 5, 1996. Dubbed Nights of Nothing, the show was a Reznor-organized industry showcase of his label's talent roster.

Prior to the concert that evening frontman Marilyn Manson and bassist Twiggy Ramirez appeared on a special episode, dedicated to the showcase, of the MTV show 120 Minutes titled "120 Minutes of Nothing" for an interview about their album with host Matt Pinfield. They also discussed the dismissal of guitarist Daisy Berkowitz during the recording and his replacement, Zim Zum. Manson attributed the separation to "creative differences" stating that, "Our old guitar player, he couldn't really grasp the concept of Antichrist Superstar." (Note: Manson on 120 Minutes: "Our old guitar player [Daisy Berkowitz], he couldn't really grasp the concept of Antichrist Superstar ... We just had creative differences, and I don't think he liked our fans really. He didn't really understand what we were about, you know, so we just wanted to represent us as honestly as possible, so we thought we'd be a lot stronger if we were to get someone else on the team." In his autobiography, Manson shared that Berkowitz misunderstood the album's concept as "a musical about Jesus Christ going on a rock tour.")

While performing the final song of that evening's five-song set, "1996", Manson threw a weighted microphone stand at the drum kit then walked offstage. The stand accidentally hit drummer Ginger Fish on the side of the head sending him face first to the floor and rendering him unconscious. Fish managed to crawl a few inches before he collapsed and was carried away by road crew to the hospital. Fish's injury required five stitches and a brief rumor spread the incident was a deliberate assault. Fish later recounted he would have been hit in the face if he hadn't turned his head at the last moment and said of the incident, "we just get a little carried away sometimes."

On September 12, 1996 MTV announced the launch date of the tour and the release date of the album. The tour launched on October 3, 1996, five days ahead of the album's official release date, on October 8, 1996.

== First leg (North American/South American/European tour 1996) ==
=== Stage show ===
The band is known for their bombastic and controversial stage theatrics involving a massive production. In his tour diary, Manson noted the difference in venues and energy from their previous outings compared to the Dead to the World Tour.

Manson often wore his signature costume consisting of an elastic back brace, a jockstrap over a G-string, sheer stockings, leather straps around his calves and heavy-soled black shoes. The shows consisted of multiple set changes including a crumbling church vitral of Jesus depicting a statuary of figures impaled on spears and accompanied by a set of long stairs from which Manson walked down in order to perform the opening piece, "Angel with the Scabbed Wings". The band played while wearing chromed stahlhelms. In his autobiography The Long Hard Road Out of Hell, Manson described the performance as simultaneously both social commentary and self-critique meant to highlight the thin line between celebrity and demagoguery.

Self-mutilation was a recurring element. For "Man That You Fear" the microphone was covered with white flowers. There was also a snow- or ash-like effect used mostly for "Cake and Sodomy" and "Cryptorchid". Marilyn Manson played the guitar for "Dried Up, Tied and Dead to the World" and "The Minute of Decay", also plays the pan flute for "Kinderfeld".

=== Theater tour (North America) ===
Hopefully, I'll be remembered as the person who brought an end to Christianity.

— Marilyn Manson

During the band's performance at New Jersey's Asbury Park Convention Hall on Halloween, rumor circulated that Manson intended to commit suicide on stage in front of a live audience. Manson dismissed the rumor as "probably hopeful parents thinking that they would have been ridding the world of Marilyn Manson, but unfortunately I plan on being around a bit longer to make things uncomfortable for everyone." The evening's performance was also delayed for an hour due to a bomb threat necessitating an explosives sweep of the venue by a K-9 unit's bomb-sniffing dogs. When the search turned up nothing, the show went on as normal. Local bands Helmet and N.Y. Loose opened the show. Manson further commented on the suicide rumor in his tour diary, "Tonight somehow the rumor got started I was going to kill myself. But I've died so much in the past year [referring to the tribulations of recording Antichrist Superstar], I don't think there's much left to kill."

Local police planned to videotape the band's two-night concert on November 13, 1996 and November 14, 1996 at Jannus Landing to ensure Manson didn't violate local obscenity laws. They were called away after both dates coincided with the St. Petersburg, Florida riots of 1996. Manson claimed in a later interview with Rolling Stone he was arrested that evening which was disputed by the St. Petersburg Police Department.

=== Europe ===
Society has traditionally always tried to find scapegoats for its problems. Well, here I am.

— Marilyn Manson.

On December 11, 1996 William Bennett organized a bipartisan press conference, along with Senator Joseph Lieberman and Secretary of Pennsylvania State C. Delores Tucker, wherein they questioned MCA—the owner of Interscope—president Edgar Bronfman Jr.'s ability to head the label competently whilst profiting from "profanity-laced" albums by artists such as Tupac Shakur, Snoop Dogg and Marilyn Manson. Tucker had previously called the band's 1995 EP Smells Like Children the "dirtiest, nastiest porno record directed at children that has ever hit the market."

The day after the press conference, Snoop Dogg met with Manson after the latter's first UK stop at the London Forum on December 12, 1996. Snoop Dogg's label, Death Row Records, confirmed the two frontmen discussed plans to collaborate on a rap rock remix of "The Beautiful People". Snoop Dogg was also on tour in England to promote his own 1996 album Tha Doggfather and was first introduced to Manson at the 1996 MTV Video Music Awards by a representative for Interscope Records. Snoop Dogg later told Spin he planned to have Manson do a guest appearance in his next record.

== Second leg (North American tour 1996–1997) ==
Until they get bored with blowing up abortion clinics, I'm safe for a little while.

— Marilyn Manson on the nightly bomb threats from right-wing groups during the tour.

A week after promotion and ticket sales began for the band's January 11, 1997 concert at the Utah State Fairpark, the CEO of the venue, John Whitaker, cancelled the band's engagement on December 19, 1997. The show was the band's first concert in more than three years at a major Salt Lake City venue since Manson tore a Book of Mormon apart onstage at the Delta Center (during their stint as support act on Nine Inch Nails' Self Destruct Tour) in protest to being banned from performing by the latter venue's management, who were offended by the band's tour merchandise. The band soon gained notoriety among the state of Utah's Mormon-majority population.

Whitaker similarly found the band's posters and song lyrics "distasteful." According to Whitaker, he could cancel the concert because the tour promoter, Scott Arnold and Dave Merkely, never signed the AFM Performance Agreement Contract. He also argued that while the Utah State Fairpark is state-owned property, it is leased and managed by Fairpark Corp., a privately held company with a family-friendly image that, "desires a reputation of high standards in our business activities. For that reason we are not going to permit you to produce the Marilyn Manson concert here."

Eight days later a group of Marilyn Manson fans who had already purchased tickets, led by an 18-year-old plaintiff identified in court filings only as "Armed", obtained the services of attorney Brian Barnard and filed a lawsuit in the United States District Court for the District of Utah on December 27, 1996 against the state of Utah on the ground that the cancellation violated their First Amendment constitutional right to hear musical expression at the concert. The lawsuit argued, "Whittaker cancelled a Marilyn Manson appearance ... based on song lyrics and advertising by the band." The plaintiffs sought no monetary damages or refunds but requested an injunction to coerce the venue to host the concert.

The band ended the year picketed by the American Family Association during their December 31, 1996 New Year's Eve concert at the Will Rogers Coliseum in Fort Worth. The protesters were able to force their way inside the venue.

The band arrived at Wolf Mountain despite the tour bus sliding off the road due to a winter storm. Deseret News reported 2,400 people braved the weather to attend the concert. The stage design consisted of a stained glass tableau that depicted Saint Michael the Archangel slaying the dragon during the War in Heaven from the 9th verse of the twelfth chapter of the Book of Revelation, a pipe organ and a fog machine. L7 opened the show and Marilyn Manson played an hour long set which included "Angel with Scabbed Wings", "Organ Grinder", "Get Your Gunn", "The Reflecting God", "The Beautiful People", and "Irresponsible Hate Anthem. Manson dedicated their performance of "Cake & Sodomy" to the Church of Jesus Christ of Latter-day Saints.

During the show, an audience member kept aiming a laser rifle–scope at Manson. An aggravated Manson dared the audience member to shoot him and stood on top of the monitor speakers to "give [him] a better target." Manson then lacerated his chest by dragging a broken bottle across it during their performance of "Sweet Dreams (Are Made of This)." Deseret News reported their rendition of the Eurythmics song drew the biggest cheers of the evening. The concert came to its climax with the song "Antichrist Superstar." For this song, the stage design was transformed into a mock fascist rally. Manson, wearing a preacher's suit, stood at a black and red rostrum emblazoned with the Antichrist Superstar 'shock' logo while tearing pages from a Bible (which some local outlets mistook for another Book of Mormon). The backdrop was changed from the stained glass tableau to three oversized vertical banners unfurled from the ceiling and similarly emblazoned as the lectern. The show ended with a two-song, 14-minute encore. (Note: The encore consisted of an unidentified song and "Man That You Fear.")

The next day on January 12, 1997 the band faced another bomb threat ahead of their performance at the O'Connor Fieldhouse in Caldwell, Idaho. In order to "give people in the community an opportunity to have an alternative" to the concert, the Caldwell First Christian Church organized a show, dubbed the "Holy War Concert", of two local Christian rock bands.

A minor incident took place the night before the band's concert at the PNE Forum on January 15, 1997 in Vancouver, British Columbia, Canada. The band held an in-store autograph- signing event at a local Canadian record store attended by thousands of fans—many of whom waited as long as 10 hours. When word broke that the band was preparing to leave, a crowd of about 500 fans still queued outside became agitated and fought one another to rush the entrance. While there were no injuries, the surge broke the store's plate glass front window prompting the band to actually leave. The mob then took to the streets but were quickly dispersed after 30 police officers arrived.

The band's February 2 concert at the Pan American Center on the campus of the New Mexico State University in Las Cruces was cancelled on January 31, 1997 due to the venue's inability to provide ample security for the event. School administrators blamed a contractual issue with local police for their inability to supplement their meager campus squad while the police department countered that they haven't patrolled school concerts in some time and that the university should have contracted a private security firm instead.

From what I have learned of the content of their lyrics and message as well as their conduct on stage, they are clearly bent on degrading women, religion and decency, while promoting satanic worship, child abuse and drug use. These people are peddling garbage. It's further proof that society's moral values continue to crumble.

— Gov. Frank Keating's official statement

The band's February 4, 1997 show in Lubbock, Texas's Fair Park Coliseum at South Plains Fairgrounds was met by protests from a group of 75 religious activists denouncing the band for their alleged endorsement of "violence and Satanism." The protesters were met by Manson showgoers outside the venue and erupted in a verbal confrontation. Later that same evening, Manson wrote in his tour diary that paramedics refused to treat him with oxygen for exhaustion. They explained to him that they didn't agree with his morality and therefore didn't deserve their services. Manson sarcastically quipped in the diary, "God has somehow managed to find his way into the Hippocratic oath ... Apparently Jesus saves, but the paramedics here don't." The band was warned to expect similar resistance heading into their next stop in Oklahoma City.

Former Republican Omaha mayor Hal Daub accused the band of promoting, "satanism, murder, and date rape" and warned parents to keep children away from their concert. He stopped short of cancelling the concert because "the band could sue the city if it was prevented from playing.

The school administration of Elmbrook Middle School in Milwaukee banned the "Marilyn Manson look" from school premises after a fight broke out between a faction of Marilyn Manson fans and "anti-Manson" students precipitated by antagonism over the Manson fans pretending to "cast spells" on the opposing group. Black lipstick, fishnet stockings, corpse paint, pentagram jewellery, and the band's T-shirts were prohibited thereafter.

== Third leg (Japan/Oceania Tour 1997) ==
=== Japan ===
If I'd really gotten my ribs removed, I would have been busy sucking my own dick on The Wonder Years instead of chasing Winnie Cooper. Besides, I wouldn't have sucked other people's dicks on stage, either. I would have been sucking my own. Plus, who really has time to be killing puppies when you can be sucking your own dick? I think I'm gonna call a surgeon in the morning.

— Marilyn Manson, Dead to the World Tour diary

While the band was in Japan for the Japanese leg of the Dead To The World Tour, MTV broke that Manson was involved in a project with Smashing Pumpkins frontman Billy Corgan who, at the time, was involved with multiple projects of his own. There were no details provided but MTV noted that both frontmen became fast friends at the premiere screening of the 1997 Howard Stern film Private Parts in New York City. Manson wrote about meeting Corgan for the first time during the premiere at length in his tour diary. (Note: In a lengthy March 1997 tour diary entry, Manson wrote about arriving to the premiere of the Howard Stern film Private Parts with his date, singer Fiona Apple, and running into Corgan whom he immediately plied with muscle relaxants, "We decided that they made us feel "fruity", and then we decided that that would be a great name for a band to start together. So we began having a long, in-depth meeting inspired by the fruity drug to create a fruit-filled experience called Fruity, which will probably never happen because I don't know where I put those pills. I was surprised that Billy was cool because I thought he'd be a total asshole from all the spiritual hate mail I had gotten over the years from Trent [Reznor], who allegedly despises Billy over an alleged conflict allegedly dealing with Courtney [Love] because when Trent allegedly fucked Courtney, which he says he didn't, Billy allegedly fucked Trent's alleged girlfriend, which he allegedly says he did, or so I'm told." The entry went on to describe the pair's drug-induced adventures that evening including Manson going home with former pornstar Jenna Jameson.) The reported joint project was never released although Corgan went on to serve as the band's unofficial music consultant for their next studio LP Mechanical Animals. Despite this, almost 21 years after the Private Parts premiere, keyboardist Madonna Wayne Gacy (who left the band in the intervening years) disputed "arrogant-yet-whiny ass" Corgan's involvement with Mechanical Animals. He further disparaged the friendship between the frontmen and went on to describe Corgan as pretentious and "thinks he's Brian Eno." (Note: Gacy: "You saw how Brian [Warner, better known as Marilyn Manson] and Jordie [White, better known as Twiggy Ramirez] hung around Billy Corgan like some sort of Idol? I refuse that shit. In fact every time I met him he pissed me off, and I wanted to punch him in the fucking face.")

Prior to the band's final show in Japan, held on March 12 in Tokyo's Club Quattro, Manson sat with MTV Japan's Ken Ayugai for an interview where he explained his motivations in writing the album,

It's always been part of my nature, growing up, to question the popular opinion of the mainstream and Antichrist Superstar really is an album about just that. It translates beyond just being against Christianity. Here I think, in Japan, people can relate to it in terms of questioning the popular opinion. It's an album about searching for something to believe in and going through religion to relationships to drugs to power to music and finding, in the end, you've got to believe in yourself.

=== Oceania ===
The final date of the band's first Oceania tour commenced, as scheduled, on March 22, 1997 at the Nimitz Hall in Honolulu, Hawaii. The Honolulu Star-Bulletin reported that the show was a sold-out performance despite protests from Christian groups Word of Life and Youth With A Mission. The show started an hour late and ended abruptly, after only 45 minutes, when Manson was rushed to the hospital in the middle of their performance of "Sweet Dreams (Are Made of This)." MTV initially reported that Manson fainted onstage and slipped on a sharp object but a representative of the concert promoter, Goldenvoice, clarified that Manson had accidentally pierced an artery while lacerating his chest with the shards of the lightbulb he smashed on the ground at the beginning of the song. He received six stitches. The protesters credited their prayer vigil with the show's abrupt end. Rumor quickly circulated in local press that the vocalist tried to commit suicide onstage by cutting his wrists open during the show which the band's manager refuted. He assured MTV that Manson was recovering. The Honolulu Star-Bulletin praised the show and noticed, "The band's noisy, but polished sound on recordings translated effectively on stage. Gone were all the weird synthetic effects—or maybe they were drowned by the guitars? All that was left was rhythm. Pounding rhythm. Primitive rhythm. Rhythm with which to slam all those around you." The next leg of the tour, exclusively arena shows, commenced as planned on April 5, 1997 at the La Crosse Center in La Crosse, Wisconsin.

== Fourth leg (Arena tour 1997) ==
There's something exciting and terrifying about club shows and theater shows, but the arena concert is so Antichrist Superstar. And tonight seeing six thousand people raise their fist to "Beautiful People" is so Nero, so powerful, bombastic, fascistic, rock and roll. It's disgusting and I love it.

— Marilyn Manson

Having failed to convince city officials to cancel the band's April 25, 1997 concert at the state-owned Wendler Arena in Saginaw, Michigan, Reverend Dana Wilson of the Saginaw Valley Community Church presented the Saginaw City Council on April 9, 1997 with a petition, signed by over 20,000 signatories, to legislate the same rating system and age restrictions on concerts as the MPAA Film Rating System and TV Rating System. The restrictions would require minors attending the Manson concert be chaperoned by their parents. Rev. Wilson asserted minors under the age of 18 are not protected by the United States Bill of Rights and therefore do not possess First Amendment protections. The proposal and the argument used to support it prompted MTV to wonder, "do Marilyn Manson fans have First Amendment Rights?"

Christian protesters who claimed the band "promoted devil worship" greeted concertgoers outside of the Jacksonville Memorial Coliseum on the night of April 17, 1997. WTLV-12 reported some of the concertgoers engaged in debate with the protesters while "others called it harassment." The protesters tried to preach to the concertgoers as they entered the Coliseum where they were frisked by security guards. By the band's request, no spiked chains, necklaces or collars were allowed inside the venue. During the concert, Manson invited the audience to spit on him. He spat on them in return. The show also featured Manson tearing an American flag apart.

Across the parking lot from the Coliseum, the Christian protesters organized a concert of local Christian rock bands at Wolfson Park. The concert played late into the night, well after the Manson show ended, "in the hope that some of the Marilyn Manson fans would wander over there after this concert and listen to some of their music and hear their messages." Later that evening, Manson recalled in his tour diary a phone call from his father, Hugh Angus Warner, who recently saw an episode of Real Stories of the Highway Patrol taped the same week the band was in Florida. The episode was about a police chase in Ohio with a "25 year old Christian fanatic with missing teeth" carrying a trunk full of guns headed to Florida "to kill the Antichrist." (Note: Tour Diary entry (undated): Just got a phone call from my father. He was watching Real Stories of the Highway Patrol and said that on the show they caught a guy they had been chasing across Ohio. When they pulled him over, they found a trunk full of guns. He was a 25 year old Christian fanatic with missing teeth, and he said he was going to Florida to kill the Antichrist. The episode had been taped the same week we just played in Florida.)

Four days after the cancellation of the Columbia, South Carolina show, the City Manager of Richmond, Virginia, Robert C. Bobb, told The Washington Post on April 15, 1997 that he intended to follow South Carolina's lead with the band's May 10, 1997 concert after found their "Satan worship and animalistic type of programming not consistent with our community standards." Bobb argued no deposit to lease the intended venue, the 13,500-capacity Richmond Coliseum, had been received by the City Council of Richmond nor, borrowing an argument from John Whitaker, had the contract with the band's concert promoter been signed. Hence, Richmond was under no legal obligation to stage the performance. The concert's promoters acknowledged the show's fate was uncertain. With only 2,000 of the 9,000 available tickets sold, the promoters met with the city council to salvage the show. Later that day, the City Council ordered the Coliseum to cancel the show. The next day, Manson and Ramirez announced they had entered studio sessions with Rasputina to record a remix of the latter's song "Transylvanian Concubine" off of their debut release Thanks for the Ether and had been enjoying a congenial working relationship during the tour.

Once again the so-called servants of God have proven my point with their hypocritical and hostile behavior. And once again they have illustrated their lack of separation between church and state and their disgusting similarities to Nazi Germany. Unfortunately everyone suffers: We suffer, our fans suffer, the Constitution of the U.S.A. suffers, and the pious right-wing politicians of South Carolina suffer because everyone now sees them for the fascist idiots they are. What do you expect from a state that still flies the Confederate flag? You want a revolution? You'll get it!

— Draft of the statement Marilyn Manson gave on MTV responding to the cancellation of their South Carolina show.

Expecting the cancellation from Richmond after the defeat in South Carolina, the Virginia branch of the American Civil Liberties Union (ACLU) began preparing a lawsuit on First Amendment grounds against the city of Richmond the very day of cancellation. The lawsuit argued that the concert was only cancelled because Richmond authorities were offended by the content of Manson's lyrics. The legal director of the ACLU of Virginia, Mary Bauer, explained to Reuters on April 17, 1997 "all of a sudden, the City Council decided they didn't like the content of the lyrics. You cannot, based upon on the content of lyrics determine who can play in a public forum." The band's attorney, First Amendment specialist Paul Cambria, followed the next day by threatening the city of Richmond with a prior restraint (i.e. censorship) and civil rights lawsuit of his own.

After issuing a press release titled, "Statement of the New Jersey Sports Authority Management Regarding Marilyn Manson and the Ozzfest Concert", on April 18, 1997 negotiations between the annual heavy metal festival Ozzfest and the operator of Giants Stadium, the New Jersey Sports and Exposition Authority (NJSEA), broke down. The NJSEA demanded the band and Pantera stricken off the roster before they would sell tickets for the June 15, 1997 show and triggered a contract clause that afforded them the "opportunity to omit any performer from the bill under certain circumstances." The operators cited crowd control concerns resulting from the band's controversial reputation and the alleged deleterious effects of their shows on youth as reasons for the demand. The festival's founder and organizer, Ozzy Osbourne, responded with a statement calling the decision "blackmail" and an abridgement of the First Amendment. Osbourne resolved to keep the band on the roster and stated, "nobody has the right to tell me who I can perform with." Cambria immediately filed a freedom of speech lawsuit against the NJSEA on behalf of Manson and concert promoters Delsener/Slater Enterprises Ltd. and Artie Festival Inc.

That evening, the tour's Winston-Salem stop at the Lawrence Joel Veterans Memorial Coliseum saw protesters from twenty Piedmont Triad churches hold prayer vigils outside of the venue. Like most Christian groups, the protesters believed the band's music advocated "murder, rape and pedophilia" and feared it "gets inside of you and you dwell on that and some people can act it out." Republican State Senator Mark McDaniel of North Carolina participated in the protests and printed three hundred leaflets calling the concert, "objectionable for children", which he and a handful of volunteers handed out to passing motorists around the coliseum. McDaniel also gave a speech at an alternative concert, that featured three local Christian rock bands, held by the local First Assembly of God. The alternative concert was organized around the same time it was announced the Dead to the World Tour was coming to town and was meant to counter the Manson show by offering an "alternative" to concertgoers. Two days later, Osbourne filed a separate lawsuit against the NJSEA on freedom of speech grounds and vowed to "take his case to the Supreme Court, if necessary."

Following a private, two hour deliberation with the city attorney on April 21, 1997, the City Council of Richmond decided to overturn City Manager Robert C. Bobb's decision to stop the band's May 10 concert. The Richmond Times-Dispatch reported that the city council determined that the city wouldn't be able to withstand the lawsuit the ACLU of Virginia threatened them with on Manson's behalf. The executive director of the Richmond ACLU, Kent Willis, noted, "It's clear that [Bobb], in announcing the cancellation, initially had not consulted the city attorney. Had he done that, all of this might have been avoided."

Speaking about the defeat, Richmond Mayor Larry E. Chavis pointed out that he authorized the city to employ other means to halt the show including offering the band an undisclosed amount of cash to skip the Richmond date, which the band refused. Ticket sales recommenced later that day after the city council received assurance from the band's representatives that the group will abide by all applicable laws. However, the city council still vowed to monitor the show and announced they would prosecute "any violation of law by any party during the performance."

Three days later on April 24, 1997 plaintiffs Ozzy Osbourne, Marilyn Manson, Delsener/Slater Enterprises Ltd. and Artie Festival Inc. consolidated their lawsuits against the New Jersey Sports and Exposition Authority (NJSEA). The four plaintiffs, under Cambria's representation, filed a preliminary injunction in the United States District Court for the District of New Jersey to compel the defendants (the NJSEA) to permit the concert and reinstate ticket sales. The next day, Cambria took aim at the American Family Association (AFA) and struck back with a four-page cease and desist letter against founder Dr. Donald E. Wildmon and Gulf Coast chapter president David Rogers for "disseminating false and libelous statements throughout the states and foreign countries" against the frontman and his bandmembers through its website, the AFA Journal and automated answering machine. The letter targeted, in particular, the pair of affidavits, from January 17, 1997 and January 24, 1997, signed by an anonymous pair of teenagers and published by the AFA that alleged the band engaged in satanic worship, child sacrifice, animal murder, bestiality, pedophilia, gang rape and drug distribution during their concerts and demanded the AFA publish a retraction, publicly apologize, and disclose the identities of the alleged affiants. The letter threatened to seek "all available legal remedies, as well as compensatory and punitive damages" against the organization.

Wildmon claimed that his organization as a whole was not responsible, but rather the AFA's Gulf Coast chapter in Biloxi, Mississippi. Cambria responded, "we're not buying any of it", and noted that while their website has been taken down, the AFA's phone bank still encouraged people to submit unsubstantiated information about Manson. Cambria reiterated his threat to retaliate and said he had begun preparation to file a lawsuit against the AFA. MTV were present during the Oklahoma concert, that the affiants claimed to have attended, and reported they did not witness any of the alleged acts. They further pointed out the security guards were employed by the venue, and not by Manson. Four days later on April 29, 1997 the New York area concert promoter for Ozzfest, Ron Delsener, met with the NJSEA to negotiate a resolution without trial that would keep Manson on the bill. The negotiation failed and the District Court of New Jersey ordered the NJSEA to appear on May 6, 1997 and present a show cause.

On the evening of May 6, 1997 the band stopped in Utica, New York for a concert at the Utica Memorial Auditorium. Their performance of the song "Dried Up, Tied and Dead to the World" was later featured on the EP Remix & Repent. Rasputina carried on as the band's opening act after Helmet parted from the tour following the Pittsburgh show. The next day, Federal District Court Judge Alfred M. Wolin of Newark, New Jersey ruled that the NJSEA, a government agency, had no right to interfere with the plaintiff's contract or ticket sales and granted the injunction which effectively guaranteed the band "right of passage" to perform at the stadium with the Ozzfest lineup.

A First Amendment violation occurs when the government "denies access to a speaker solely to suppress the point of view he espouses on an otherwise includable subject." Id. The government may prohibit all forms of communication as long as the ban is reasonable and content-neutral. See United States Postal Service v. Council of Greenburgh Civic Ass'ns, 453 U.S. 114, 131 n. 7, 101 S.Ct. 2676, 2686 n. 7, 69 L.Ed.2d 517 (1981). "The challenged regulation need only be reasonable, as long as the regulation is not an effort to suppress the speaker's activity due to disagreement with the speaker's view." See Krishna v. Lee, 505 U.S. at 678, 112 S.Ct. at 2705.

— Federal District Court Judge Alfred M. Wolin's ruling on Marilyn Manson, Inc v. New Jersey Sports & Exposition Authority

The case Marilyn Manson, Inc v. New Jersey Sports & Exposition Authority found that the defendants had "violated [the] plaintiffs' rights under the First, Fifth, and Fourteenth Amendments to the United States Constitution and the corresponding provisions of the New Jersey Constitution." Judge Wolin lectured the defendants on the meaning of the First Amendment and "permanently enjoined and restrained [the defendants] from prohibiting [the plaintiffs] ... from presenting the OzzFest '97 concert performance." Wolin further noted that "the NJSEA's requirement that all performers sign a contract allowing the NJSEA to regulate the morality of concert programs may be an unreasonable restriction on access to even a non-public forum. Plaintiffs argue that the NJSEA's authority to reject any performer based on inadequately defined guidelines is an unconstitutional prior restraint on speech." (Note: Judge's opinion on the case: Currently before the Court is an application to enjoin the New Jersey Sports Exposition Authority ("NJSEA") from preventing the "OzzFest '97" concert, which includes performer "Marilyn Manson", from being held on June 15, 1997 at Giants Stadium. Marilyn Manson is a heavy metal band that the NJSEA has deemed objectionable. Marilyn Manson's right of passage to perform at Giants Stadium is now impeded by roadblocks created by the collision between well established constitutional and contractual principles. This Court ordered on April 29, 1997 that the NJSEA appear on May 6, 1997, to show cause why the NJSEA should not be preliminarily and thereafter permanently enjoined and restrained from: (1) prohibiting plaintiffs Marilyn Manson, Inc., Artie Festivals N.J., Inc. ("Artie"), and Delsener/Slater Enterprises, Ltd. ("Delsener/Slater") from presenting the OzzFest '97 concert performance including the band Marilyn Manson at Giants Stadium on June 15, 1997; (2) prohibiting or otherwise interfering with ticket sales for OzzFest '97 to be held at Giants Stadium on June 15, 1997; and (3) taking any action to repudiate or otherwise breach its agreement to lease Giants Stadium to plaintiffs on June 15, 1997. Plaintiffs ultimately seek (1) a judgment declaring that the NJSEA has violated plaintiffs' rights under the First, Fifth, and Fourteenth Amendments to the United States Constitution and the corresponding provisions of the New Jersey Constitution; (2) an order permanently enjoining the NJSEA from violating plaintiffs' Federal and State constitutional rights, (3) an award of damages, costs, and attorneys' fees under 42 U.S.C. §§ 1983 and 1988, and (4) a judgment on plaintiffs' claims for anticipatory breach of contract and promissory estoppel. The Court has considered the written submissions of the parties1 and the oral arguments presented. For the reasons stated herein, the Court will grant plaintiffs' request for a preliminary injunction.) The NJSEA vowed to appeal the court ruling. That evening the band recorded their performance of "Antichrist Superstar" at The Meadows in Hartford, Connecticut. The recording was also included in Remix & Repent.

Inspired by the constant controversy that hounded the tour, MTV launched an online trivia game called 'Route 666' on May 8, 1997. The game laid out the band's US tour itinerary, and quizzed players on the events that happened before, during, and after each stop. Tragedy struck the tour on May 9, 1997 when a member of the band's lighting crew, 30-year-old Sean McGann, fell 90 ft. from a catwalk to his death while setting up equipment for the band's show at the D.C. Armory in Washington, D.C. Police confirmed McGann was intoxicated and ruled the death an accident. Manson dedicated that evening's performance of "Sweet Dreams (Are Made of This)" in his memory. (Note: Tour diary entry on McGann's death (dated May 10, 1997): Just found out that one of my roadies, Sean McGann, died last night. He had been drinking and was trying to rappel down the catwalk. But he forgot to attach the ropes. I know it's not my fault, but I can't help feeling that it somehow is, because if it wasn't for me he'd still be alive. Maybe I've lived a sheltered life, because outside of my dog Aleusha this is really the first person close to me who has died. It makes me wonder what I was thinking years ago when I tried to kill Nancy and our old bassist, Brad. Trying to kill them would have been pointless. Nature takes its own course. It's Social Darwinism. People get what they deserve. But did Sean really deserve that?)

During the Richmond concert the following evening, the Richmond Times-Dispatch estimated "a hundred-plus" Christian protesters, including Dr. Paul Richardson of the Christ Worship Center and evangelist Shirley Jackson, descended on the concert. The protesters accosted concertgoers with slogans like "God loves you" and "If you don't repent, you will die in a lake of fire!" They also handed out free cans of Surge as they urged concertgoers to leave. An ad hoc group called Citizens for Decency in America was also present and held banners that said, "He's [Jesus] coming soon" and "Hell is Real". The Richmond Times-Dispatch reported concertgoers either mocked the protesters or engaged them in debate about faith and free speech while two local radio stations situated at the 7th Street entrance to the Coliseum, alternative rock WRXL-FM and urban gospel WBZU-FM, engaged in "battling decibels" as they each tried to drown out one another.

The city council followed through on their promise to monitor the show and distributed undercover members of the local vice squad among the audience. Manson led the audience to an expletive-filled lampoon of the City Manager, as he took the stage, for trying to cancel the show before he wiped the American flag on his ass then derided both the vice cops in the audience and the Christian protesters outside the venue. The Richmond Times-Dispatch described the show as "one of the starkest culture clashes in Coliseum history"

The Arena leg of the tour ended with a performance at the Blockbuster Sony E-Centre in Camden, New Jersey on May 11, 1997. Six days later, the NJSEA officially abandoned plans to appeal the ruling and allowed tickets for the June 15, 1997 Ozzfest show at the Giants Stadium to go on sale, with Manson on the bill, on May 17, 1997 for US$40 (equivalent to US$80 in 2025). MTV remarked of Manson's legal battles, "[the band] has become a political punching bag for showboating local officials across the country this year." Rasputina travelled to Europe with the band and continued as opening act for the tour's pair of festival dates in the Netherlands.

== Fifth leg (European festival tour 1997) ==
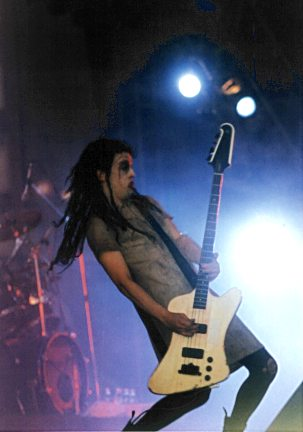
Twiggy during the "Dead to the World Tour"

Controversy finally followed the band outside of the United States. By now a globally recognized household name, a group of 400 Welsh Christians unsuccessfully tried to put a stop to the band's May 19 concert at the Newport Civic Centre. Having failed that, the group picketed the band's concert. The group was organized by a local Welsh pastor named Ray Bevan, who is the father of 60 Ft. Dolls drummer Carl Bevan.

The remix sessions for Rasputina's song "Transylvanian Concubine" concluded by the latter half of May. It was reported that Manson and Ramirez completed three versions of the track. One of the versions was made available on May 21 as a free downloadable preview, in RealAudio format, on Rasputina's website. A week later, it was reported that all three versions would be made available in an EP titled Transylvanian Regurgitations due in mid-June.

Snoop Dogg met again with Manson during their Paris stop on May 29 at Le Bataclan. Manson recounted in his tour diary how Snoop Dogg, who was still on tour, reaffirmed his interest to work together on a project "and something involving marijuana." (Note: Tour diary entry (May 29, 1997, Paris): I talked to Snoop Doggy Dogg today. Well, I'm not sure if you could really call it talked because I could hardly understand a word he was saying. I think what he was trying to communicate was that he wanted to work with me in some sort of capacity and something involving marijuana.) Despite this, the rap rock collaboration remix of "The Beautiful People" never materialized.

After their Milan performance, the band took time off the tour and headed to a New York studio again. This time with British trip hop band Sneaker Pimps to begin the recording process on "Long Hard Road Out of Hell". Both groups were chosen to collaborate on a song for the "metal meets electronica" soundtrack of the 1997 motion picture Spawn.

== Seventh leg (Canadian tour 1997) ==
A July 22 concert at La Luna in Portland, Oregon was canceled when the venue was unable to obtain insurance for the event.

Their concert at Calgary's Max Bell Arena three days later was canceled by the owner of the venue, Larry Ryckman, who cited the band's reputation as justification for doing so. He was later successfully sued by the band's promoters for $66,000 in damages.

I want to tell you about something that happened recently. There's a song that's twenty years old written by a woman named Patti Smith. And a couple of white cops came up to me and they said, 'You can't sing that song.' They said that it's against black people. What I wanna explain to those moronic fucking idiots is that song's about people like me and you, people that get discriminated against for the way we are. Just like they fucking discriminated against us today. And they didn't understand. It's because they are a bunch of fucking idiots. So I dedicate this song to the Canadian police force.

— Marilyn Manson's introduction to their rendition of the Patti Smith's "Rock N Roll Nigger" in Toronto.

An incident with the Toronto Police Service took place during their July 31, 1997 show at Toronto's Varsity Arena. MuchMusic's FAX reported the police warned Manson and his entourage backstage that if the band performed their rendition of Patti Smith's song "Rock N Roll Nigger", the frontman would be arrested for "promoting racial disharmony" under Canada's Hate speech laws. Manson recounted in his tour diary that, in an effort to "fuck with the police", he wore a peaked police cap during the encounter and had himself accompanied by his African-American friend, Corey, who "looks like he'll kick the shit out of anyone who's white" and his bodyguard, Aaron.

When asked which song they had issue with, Manson recounted the ruse worked as the caucasian officer in charge "nervously mumbled" the offending song title "specifically so as not to offend Corey." Manson told FAX that he explained to the officer the song wasn't meant to be racist rather, "it's written on behalf of artists and musicians and people who feel they're on the outside of society—that they've been discriminated against for who they are or what they believe", and noted the irony that in being told what he can't sing the officer unwittingly engaged in the type of discrimination discussed by the song. The hapless officer seemed nonplussed, according to Manson, so he informed the cops no revisions would be made to the set list and "we would see what happened when it was done."

To further embarrass the police, Manson gave a speech about the encounter to the audience as he introduced the song as an encore then invited Corey to help him sing, particularly the lines with the offending lyric. Manson also donned a police uniform along with the badge of a cop killed in the line of duty. Manson ended his diary entry on the incident stating, "what we and the crowd realized more than anything was that nobody here hated 'niggers.' We all hated cops. I didn't get arrested or even reprimanded. The cops might not have been listening, though. They were probably too busy searching the bathrooms for plungers to stick up our asses." (Note: The full tour diary entry (dated July 31, 1997, Toronto): Today the police told me that if I sang the Patti Smith song "Rock N Roll Nigger" I would be arrested under the hate crime law for promoting racial disharmony. So to fuck with the police I had a friend of mine, Corey, who happens to be black, accompany me and my bodyguard, Aaron, into my meeting with these moronic individuals. Wearing a police hat, I asked the officer in charge what problems he had with our show. He nervously shuffled through his notes and said "There's one song in particular", as if he couldn't remember what it was, and then he mumbles "Rock and Roll Nigger", specifically so as not to offend Corey, who looks like he'll kick the shit out of anyone who's white. I went on to explain to him that not only did Patti Smith write the song (and not me) but that the song represents that isolation and discrimination of people for their ideas and their beliefs and their art which ironically was exactly what this asshole was doing. He still didn't seem to understand so I told him quite simply I would do the song and we would see what happened when it was done. Though I told him the show would not be changed, I did change it in several simple ways. I donned a police uniform and something given to me by a fan, a badge formerly in the possession of an officer shot in the line of duty. I also invited Corey to help me sing, in particular the lines with the word nigger in them. We performed the song as an encore, and I introduced it by saying, "I want to tell you about something that happened recently. There's a song that's twenty years old written by a woman named Patti Smith. And a couple of white cops came up to me and they said, 'You can't sing that song.' They said that it's against black people. What I wanna explain to those moronic fucking idiots is that song's about people like me and you, people that get discriminated against for the way we are. Just like they fucking discriminated against us today. And they didn't understand. It's because they are a bunch of fucking idiots. So I dedicate this song to the Canadian police force." What we and the crowd realized more than anything was that nobody here hated 'niggers.' We all hated cops. I didn't get arrested or even reprimanded. The cops might not have been listening, though. They were probably too busy searching the bathrooms for plungers to stick up our asses.)

On the same day, Manson and the Sneaker Pimps announced that their joint effort for the Spawn soundtrack was complete and the collaboration went smoothly. According to Manson, the songwriting process consisted of his band writing and recording the song. They then sent the Sneaker Pimps a master tape of their work, "almost in a remix sense, that they would take our ideas and interpret them." Manson described the Sneaker Pimps' contributions to the song as "very magical" and added that he "adored" vocalist Kelli Ali's input. Ali's bandmate, Liam Howe, also voiced similar satisfaction with the final product and described it as, "a really interesting hybrid of comedy-electro-Goth, which is exactly what we like."

== Final leg (European/South American/Mexican tour 1997) ==
=== Politically Incorrect appearance ===
You can't judge who is Christ and who isn't. He may have more Christ in him than you do.

— Florence Henderson, defending Manson after Lakita Garth criticized him for comparing himself to Jesus Christ.

Manson appeared as a panelist alongside Florence Henderson, G. Gordon Liddy and Lakita Garth on ABC network's late-night political talk show Politically Incorrect with host Bill Maher. The episode aired on August 13, 1997 while the band was in Rome, Italy for their show at the Palaghiaccio di Marino. The panel discussed topics ranging from the "symbiotic relationship" between Christian groups and "whoever they're against", individualism, social perception, the history of Rock music controversy, music censorship, perspective, religious hypocrisy, violence perpetrated in the name of the Bible, personal responsibility and sexual repression.

The episode was marked by a stark contrast between Garth's combative attitude and Manson's calm articulation. Garth, a conservative Christian and an advocate for abstinence, disapproved of Manson's views and onstage antics. In her words, "when I see this young man, you know, it does draw a line in the standard. We need to realize we are in a cultural war and everyone wants to straddle the fence. Either you are Antichrist or you are Christ. It's as simple as that."

Maher challenged Garth, "don't you think all of us have both [good and evil] in us?", to which she indignantly replied, "I don't! No, I don't!" Maher noted the distinction between the rumors and "the reality" of what Manson's concerts consisted of, some of which Maher observed were, indeed, controversial. In particular, Maher pointed to Manson destroying Bibles on stage and desecrating the flag of the United States by wiping it on his ass. When Maher confronted him about it, Manson responded:

Absolutely. They're designed to make people think. But the point with the Bible or flag is to say, "It's only as valid as you make it in your heart." A piece of paper or a piece of cloth doesn't mean anything. It's what you believe. And I want people to think about what they believe. I want them to consider if everything they've been taught, if that's what they want to believe or if that's what they've been told that they have to believe.

Manson reasserted his goal to encourage thinking for one's self by challenging people's values. He argued the value in looking at things from a different perspective which Garth repeatedly opposed to, insisting the Christian perspective is the only valid one. Henderson, best known for her role as the matriarch Carol Brady in the American TV sitcom The Brady Bunch, came to Manson's defense, "It's all about perception, isn't it, Marilyn?" She recalled, "you know what? I look back—seriously, I look back at the early "Brady Bunch" days. I looked like the Antichrist. That hair and the skirt and the platforms, right?"

I like [The Bible] as a book. Just like I like The Cat in the Hat.

— Manson's response to Garth's accusation that he took the Bible out of context.

Watergate scandal conspirator G. Gordon Liddy was notably sparse in his commentary, in part because Garth talked over everyone. He did have moments such as when he exclaimed, "he is not taking the Bible out of context, he is taking Friedrich Nietzsche out of context!" about Manson, during a heated conversation on violence perpetrated in the name of the Bible. The panel also discussed lyrics in Garth's own rap album Lakita, specifically those from a song that dissuade young people from condom-use. Maher thought it would encourage condom fatigue among "horny teenagers" and found it to be "more irresponsible than anything on one of [Manson's] records."

Several publications noted that Henderson had taken Manson's side throughout the episode and was eager to defend him. Stephan Horbelt of Hornet described it as "quite an exciting moment in pop culture." Even Maher observed, "Mrs. Brady, I think we've made a love connection", prompting her to grab Manson's hand and joke "we're going to the prom together."

It's very admirable to be idealistic. You know, I want people to think, but I'm not trying to think I can save the world. Maybe they only deserve to be entertained before they're all destroyed.

— Manson to Bill Maher, who replied, "I couldn't agree more."

Henderson was visibly annoyed during the show by Garth's sanctimony and prudery. In one instance, Garth boasted that on her public speaking tours she encouraged young people "to do something good" and took "full responsibility" for her words, suggesting Manson did neither. Henderson retorted, "Well you certainly know how to speak, Lakita, let me tell you that!" In another heated exchange, Garth recounted refusing jobs that involved profanity, indecency or immorality (which she characterized as "spread[ing] my legs for any ol' Joe") due to her moral standards. An exasperated Henderson admonished, "I hope you will always be able to live like that. I hope you don't have many challenges in life." Garth insisted she did and, after Henderson sardonically asked "do you?", angrily snapped back, "I have very many challenges in life. And I would like for you to come to dinner with me and learn those challenges on that [unintelligible]! And you can pick up the tab."

Maher voiced similar frustration with Garth's stubbornness. In one instance, Garth invited Manson to dinner with her friends "and just shoot the breeze", Maher jested "and then you could be with Ted Kennedy one night" (a reference to the Chappaquiddick incident). He also cracked that the sole Commandment in The Satanic Bible was "kill Lakita Garth" when Garth quizzed Manson about it. Almost 18 years after the episode aired, Manson was asked by an audience member during The End Times Tour press conference if he was interested to reprise his appearance on Maher's successor show to Politically Incorrect, Real Time with Bill Maher on HBO. Manson said he wasn't. (Note: Manson explained that while he liked Maher's 2008 documentary film Religulous, he found Real Time with Bill Maher to be "not balanced". He explained, "He did have a magic when he would invite completely diametrically opposed characters on the show that made it politically incorrect, but obviously he got kicked off TV for that.")

=== 1997 MTV Video Music Awards performance ===
The band took two weeks off following the last European show of the tour on August 24, 1997 at the Reading and Leeds Festivals. On September 4, 1997 the band flew to New York and performed "The Beautiful People" for the grand finale of the 1997 MTV Video Music Awards. The song had reached No.26 on the Billboard Modern Rock Tracks chart and its music video was nominated at the show for Best Rock Video.

Preceded by a marching band playing "Hail to the Chief", Manson entered the stage in a full-body black fur coat flanked by mock United States Secret Service agents, and delivered a speech to the audience of Hollywood celebrities from a microphone-covered lectern emblazoned with the phrase 'Antichrist Superstar' in classical Latin script and the band's 'shock' logo fashioned to look like the seal of the president of the United States:

My fellow Americans, we will no longer be oppressed by the fascism of Christianity. And we will no longer be oppressed by the fascism of beauty. As I see you all sitting out there trying your hardest not to be ugly, trying your hardest not to fit in, trying your hardest to earn your way into Heaven, but let me ask you—do you want to be in a place that's filled with a bunch of assholes?

After the speech the band launched into "The Beautiful People", with Manson striking rigid poses as he sang. Manson removed his coat midway thru the song and revealed a second costume underneath that consisted of a leather corset and g-string which revealed his bare buttocks, a pair of thigh-high fishnet hosiery attached to a leather garter belt and calf-high leather boots. The performance came to its climax as the band smashed their instruments at the end of the song. As the show closed, host Chris Rock teasingly yelled for the audience to "Run to church right now! Get your asses into church, or you're going to hell!". Despite their extremely negative review of the program as a whole, Rolling Stone singled out the performance as "riveting".

=== South America, Mexico and the end of the tour ===
At the launch of the annual music festival CMJ Music Marathon, the Sneaker Pimps expressed disappointment with result of their Spawn collaboration, "Long Hard Road Out of Hell." The group explained that, despite their distaste for heavy metal music, they saw the collaboration as an opportunity to, in Howe's words, "polish a turd." They claimed they were not invited to the song's final mixing then prevented from creating their own mix by not being provided a master tape. Howe dismissed the standalone single as "kind of dance meets metal or rock or whatever." Ali was more pointed in her criticisms. She said Manson's band "weren't very good" and called the song "crap."

I wouldn't waste my time having hard feelings. I've already forgotten their names ... Their participation, and now their opinion, is quite irrelevant to me.

— Marilyn Manson on the Sneaker Pimps,

The following week, Manson took time off during the second evening of their show in Buenos Aires and responded through MTV Latino. He called the Sneaker Pimps "very confused individuals." He disputed their claim that they weren't issued a master recording, suggesting that they had created a remix for the song, but refused permission for it to appear on the single when they were informed it would appear as a b-side, instead of as the main single version. He also characterized their involvement as "a bit of a favor, in a sense, because we had already written the song, and I was interested in finding a girl to sing back-up vocals on it, and [they] were begging, asking to be involved with us. I thought they had a good single, and the girl's voice was great. When we worked on the song, I think they were a little upset, because there wasn't much for them to do because the song was already done." Manson also announced plans to shoot a music video for the song following the conclusion of the tour in Mexico City.

The second to last show of the tour on September 14, 1997 at Santiago, Chile's Central Court National Stadium attracted protests from a bishop and a local trucker's union. The protesters alleged the band was promoting Satanism in the majority Catholic nation.

== Aftermath ==
Eight days after the end of the tour former guitarist, Scott Putesky (aka Daisy Berkowitz), filed a lawsuit against the band, their lawyer, Nothing Records and the frontman for breach of contract and legal malpractice. The suit alleged wrongful dismissal and outstanding royalties. Putesky claimed he was discharged after a six-year tenure, which included helping start the band, with no warning during the recording of Antichrist Superstar. He said the band simply bought him a plane ticket home as a way of informing him his employment was terminated. The band's manager asserted that Putesky sent a letter of resignation and thought the departure was on amicable terms.

== Critical reception ==
Reviews of the tour from music critics of the period were generally divided among political, religious and generational lines, with a few notable exceptions. Before the Salt Lake City show even commenced, the editorial board of The Salt Lake Tribune dismissed the band's songs as "profanity [laced] and anti-establishment swill" and likened allowing such "low-class entertainment" to perform at the Utah State Fairpark to "accommodating the Ku Klux Klan." Guided by that editorial slant, The Salt Lake Tribune writer Steven Brophy disparaged the actual concert. Seemingly disappointed with the absence of the band's alleged props and antics such as, "fluorescent sexual devices, on-stage nudity and simulated sex acts", Brophy dismissed the show as "tame, poorly done B-movie theatrics" and the band thus, "if the Sex Pistols were the original great rock n' roll swindle, then Marilyn Manson is the sequel." Scott Iwasaki of Deseret News shared similar sentiment going so far as to describe Manson as "the pretentious prince of industrial metal", the band as "uninspiring", and the bible-tearing portion of the performance, "been there, done that. C'mon guys, time for a new gimmick. This one's getting old." Both writers disdained the band's song catalog with the sole exception of their cover of Eurythmics' "Sweet Dreams (Are Made Of This)", which they noted elicited a sing-along from the audience. While Brophy thought opening act L7 "outplayed Manson", Iwasaki was less enthusiastic and described their "slick choreography and power chords [as] nothing but Judas Priest leftovers."

Then there's the mainstream media, playing its usual double-faced game. Namely: run endless sensationalistic stories about Manson, and then run numerous editorials rife with the usual "we're so jaded and above it all" tone [that] give the impression "it's just Alice Cooper again", as if any kid today could give a flying whizz about a guy who last released a memorable album in 1973, you know, before most of Manson's fans were born.

Unlike the other theatrical rock performers to who he's often compared—Cooper, KISS—Manson's art is not merely meant for the passive consumption of spectacle. He's overtly rhetorical, constantly striving to influence his audience and uses his theatrics to implant within them the germ of his Satanic philosophy, which after all is really a more colorful version of good ol' atheistic existentialism a la Nietzsche, Sartre and Camus. This theme was exemplified in Manson's forlorn reading of "Man That You Fear" at the show's conclusion, standing, as he was, alone at center stage, slowly buried beneath a barrage of artificial snow.

In a world in which the anaesthetized, TV-fed masses wait to be told what to think by slimy politicians, hypocritical religious leaders and conniving corporations, Manson's true sin is to posit the notion that all of these people are full of shit, that the only way to live an authentic life is to take away their reins of power and remake yourself in your own image. To think for yourself: A notion that truly scares many people out of their wits.

Never mind the bollocks—that's why they're protesting.

== Broadcasts and recordings ==
Due to "disagreements" between Nothing Records and its distributor, Interscope, Dead To The World and Remix & Repent were put on hold from release in 1997. It was finally launched on February 10, 1998 on VHS, documenting the infamous tour of the same name by Marilyn Manson. It contains primarily live performances but delves into backstage and archival footage of the band. Manson stated in November 2005 that he was interested in re-releasing Dead to the World and its follow-up God Is in the TV on DVD. Nothing has surfaced so far.

=== Setlist ===
The following list contains the most commonly played songs in the order they were most generally performed:

1. Intro
2. "Angel with the Scabbed Wings"
3. "Get Your Gunn"
4. "Cake and Sodomy"
5. "Dogma"
6. "Dried Up, Tied and Dead to the World"
7. "Tourniquet"
8. "Kinderfeld"
9. "My Monkey"
10. "Lunchbox"
11. "Sweet Dreams (Are Made of This)"
12. "Minute of Decay"
13. "The Suck for Your Solution"
14. "Deformography"
15. "1999"
16. "Little Horn"
17. "Apple of Sodom"
18. "Cryptorchid"
19. "Antichrist Superstar"
20. "The Beautiful People"
21. "The Reflecting God"
22. "Irresponsible Hate Anthem"
23. "Mister Superstar"
24. "1996"
25. "Rock 'n' Roll Nigger"
26. "Misery Machine"
27. "Man That You Fear"

== Tour dates ==
List of concerts, showing date, city, country, and venue
Date	City	Country	Venue	Opening act(s)	Attendance	Revenue
Nights of Nothing
September 5, 1996	New York City	United States	Irving Plaza	none	—N/a	—N/a
Leg 1: North American/South American/European Tour 1996
Theater tour (North America)
October 3, 1996	Kalamazoo	United States	State Theatre	NY Loose	—N/a	—N/a
October 4, 1996	Davenport	United States	Colonial Ballroom	NY Loose	—N/a	—N/a
October 5, 1996	St. Louis	United States	Mississippi Nights	NY Loose	—N/a	—N/a
October 7, 1996	Columbia	United States	The Blue Note	NY Loose	—N/a	—N/a
October 8, 1996	Lawrence	United States	Liberty Hall	NY Loose	—N/a	—N/a
October 9, 1996	Minneapolis	United States	First Avenue	NY Loose	—N/a	—N/a
October 11, 1996	Milwaukee	United States	Modjeska Theater	NY Loose	—N/a	—N/a
October 12, 1996	Chicago	United States	Riviera Theatre	NY Loose	—N/a	—N/a
October 13, 1996	Madison	United States	Barrymore Theatre	NY Loose	—N/a	—N/a
October 15, 1996	Detroit	United States	State Theatre	NY Loose	—N/a	—N/a
October 16, 1996	Columbus	United States	Newport Music Hall	NY Loose	—N/a	—N/a
October 18, 1996	Cincinnati	United States	Bogart's	NY Loose	—N/a	—N/a
October 19, 1996	Cleveland	United States	Agora Theatre and Ballroom	NY Loose	—N/a	—N/a
October 20, 1996	Buffalo	United States	Ogden Theatre	NY Loose	—N/a	—N/a
October 22, 1996	Toronto	Canada	The Warehouse	NY Loose	2,269 / 2,269	$31,120
October 23, 1996	Montreal	Canada	The Spectrum	NY Loose	—N/a	—N/a
October 25, 1996	Burlington	United States	Burlington Memorial Auditorium	NY Loose	—N/a	—N/a
October 26, 1996	Boston	United States	Avalon	NY Loose	—N/a	—N/a
October 27, 1996	Providence	United States	The Strand	NY Loose	—N/a	—N/a
October 29, 1996	New York City	United States	Roseland Ballroom	NY Loose	3,251 / 3,251	$53,643
October 30, 1996	Philadelphia	United States	Electric Factory	NY Loose	—N/a	—N/a
October 31, 1996	Asbury Park	United States	Asbury Park Convention Hall	NY Loose	3,266 / 3,500	$65,320
November 2, 1996	Henrietta	United States	Dome Arena	NY Loose	—N/a	—N/a
November 3, 1996	Hartford	United States	Webster Theater	NY Loose	1,195 / 1,195	$20,913
November 5, 1996	Baltimore	United States	Hammerjack's	NY Loose	—N/a	—N/a
November 6, 1996	Washington, D.C.	United States	9:30 Club	NY Loose	—N/a	—N/a
November 8, 1996	Norfolk	United States	The Boathouse	NY Loose	—N/a	—N/a
November 9, 1996	Raleigh	United States	Ritz	NY Loose	—N/a	—N/a
November 10, 1996	Charlotte	United States	Grady Cole Center	NY Loose	—N/a	—N/a
November 11, 1996	Atlanta	United States	International Ballroom	NY Loose	—N/a	—N/a
November 13, 1996	St. Petersburg	United States	Jannus Landing	NY Loose	—N/a	—N/a
November 14, 1996	St. Petersburg	United States	Jannus Landing	NY Loose	—N/a	—N/a
November 15, 1996	Orlando	United States	Embassy Music Hall	NY Loose	—N/a	—N/a
November 16, 1996	Sunrise	United States	Sunrise Amphitheatre	NY Loose	—N/a	—N/a
South America
November 20, 1996	Rio de Janeiro	Brazil	Estádio da Gávea	none	—N/a	—N/a
November 22, 1996	Santiago	Chile	Central Court National Stadium	none	—N/a	—N/a
November 24, 1996	Buenos Aires	Argentina	Estadio Arquitecto Ricardo Etcheverry	none	—N/a	—N/a
Europe
November 28, 1996	Copenhagen	Denmark	Vega	Fluffy	—N/a	—N/a
November 29, 1996	Berlin	Germany	Trash	Fluffy	—N/a	—N/a
December 1, 1996	Munich	Germany	Strom	Fluffy	—N/a	—N/a
December 2, 1996	Cologne	Germany	Die Kantine	Fluffy	—N/a	—N/a
December 3, 1996	Hamburg	Germany	Markthalle Hamburg	Fluffy	—N/a	—N/a
December 4, 1996	Amsterdam	Netherlands	Arena	Fluffy	—N/a	—N/a
December 6, 1996	Brussels	Belgium	Vaartkapoen	Fluffy	—N/a	—N/a
December 7, 1996	Paris	France	Le Bataclan	Fluffy	—N/a	—N/a
December 8, 1996	Barcelona	Spain	Bikini	Fluffy	—N/a	—N/a
December 9, 1996	Madrid	Spain	Ktdral	Fluffy	—N/a	—N/a
December 12, 1996	London	United Kingdom	London Forum	Fluffy	—N/a	—N/a
December 13, 1996	Nottingham	United Kingdom	Rock City	Fluffy	—N/a	—N/a
December 14, 1996	Glasgow	United Kingdom	The Garage, moved from The Cathouse	Fluffy	—N/a	—N/a
December 15, 1996	Manchester	United Kingdom	Manchester University Main Debating Hall	Fluffy	—N/a	—N/a
Leg 2: North American tour 1996–1997
December 27, 1996	Nashville	United States	Nashville Municipal Auditorium	Drill	—N/a	—N/a
December 28, 1996	Birmingham	United States	Boutwell Memorial Auditorium	Drill	—N/a	—N/a
December 29, 1996	New Orleans	United States	State Palace Theatre	Drill	—N/a	—N/a
December 31, 1996	Fort Worth	United States	Will Rogers Coliseum	Drill	—N/a	—N/a
January 2, 1997	Austin	United States	Austin Music Hall	Drill	—N/a	—N/a
January 3, 1997	San Antonio	United States	Live Oak Civic Center	Drill	3,297 / 3,297	$63,593
January 4, 1997	Houston	United States	International Ballroom	L7	4,344 / 4,344	$106,427
January 5, 1997	Houston	United States	International Ballroom	L7	4,344 / 4,344	$106,427
January 7, 1997	Springfield	United States	Abou Ben Adhem Shrine Mosque	L7	—N/a	—N/a
January 8, 1997	Wichita	United States	Cotillion Ballroom	L7	—N/a	—N/a
January 10, 1997	Denver	United States	Mammoth Events Center	L7	—N/a	—N/a
January 11, 1997	Park City	United States	Wolf Mountain	L7	—N/a	—N/a
January 12, 1997	Caldwell	United States	O'Connor Fieldhouse	L7	1,999 / 1,999	$37,981
January 15, 1997	Vancouver	Canada	PNE Forum	L7	—N/a	—N/a
January 17, 1997	Seattle	United States	Moore Theatre	L7	—N/a	—N/a
January 18, 1997	Seattle	United States	Moore Theatre	L7	—N/a	—N/a
January 19, 1997	Salem	United States	Salem Armory Auditorium	L7	—N/a	—N/a
January 21, 1997	San Francisco	United States	The Warfield	L7	—N/a	—N/a
January 22, 1997	San Francisco	United States	The Warfield	L7	—N/a	—N/a
January 24, 1997	Phoenix	United States	Phoenix Civic Plaza	L7	—N/a	—N/a
January 25, 1997	Santa Monica	United States	Santa Monica Civic Auditorium	L7	—N/a	—N/a
January 28, 1997	San Diego	United States	Crosby Hall	L7	—N/a	—N/a
January 29, 1997	Paradise	United States	The Joint	L7	—N/a	—N/a
January 30, 1997	Paradise	United States	The Joint	L7	—N/a	—N/a
February 1, 1997	Albuquerque	United States	Albuquerque Convention Center	L7	—N/a	—N/a
February 4, 1997	Lubbock	United States	Fair Park Coliseum at South Plains Fairgrounds	L7	—N/a	—N/a
February 5, 1997	Oklahoma City	United States	Oklahoma City Fairgrounds TNT Building	L7	—N/a	—N/a
February 7, 1997	Kansas City	United States	Memorial Hall	L7	—N/a	—N/a
February 8, 1997	Omaha	United States	Omaha Civic Auditorium Mancuso Hall	L7	—N/a	—N/a
February 9, 1997	Des Moines	United States	Convention Center	L7	—N/a	—N/a
February 11, 1997	Toledo	United States	Toledo Sports Arena	L7	—N/a	—N/a
February 13, 1997	Indianapolis	United States	Pepsi Coliseum	L7	—N/a	—N/a
February 14, 1997	Trotwood	United States	Hara Arena	L7	—N/a	—N/a
February 15, 1997	Wheeling	United States	Wheeling Civic Center	L7	—N/a	—N/a
February 18, 1997	Troy	United States	Houston Field House	L7	—N/a	—N/a
February 19, 1997	Springfield	United States	Springfield Civic Center	L7	—N/a	—N/a
February 21, 1997	Fitchburg	United States	Wallace Civic Center	L7	—N/a	—N/a
March 4, 1997	Anchorage	United States	The Egan Center	L7	—N/a	—N/a
Leg 3: Japan/Oceania tour 1997
Asia
March 7, 1997	Osaka	Japan	Club Quattro	L7	—N/a	—N/a
March 9, 1997	Nagoya	Japan	Club Quattro	L7	—N/a	—N/a
March 11, 1997	Tokyo	Japan	Club Quattro	L7	—N/a	—N/a
March 12, 1997	Tokyo	Japan	Club Quattro	L7	—N/a	—N/a
Oceania
March 15, 1997	Sydney	Australia	Enmore Theatre	L7	—N/a	—N/a
March 17, 1997	Melbourne	Australia	The Place	L7	—N/a	—N/a
March 19, 1997	Auckland	New Zealand	The Powerhouse	L7	—N/a	—N/a
March 22, 1997	Honolulu	United States	Nimitz Hall	L7	—N/a	—N/a
Leg 4: Arena tour 1997
April 5, 1997	La Crosse	United States	La Crosse Center	NY Loose	—N/a	—N/a
April 6, 1997	Normal	United States	Redbird Arena	NY Loose	—N/a	—N/a
April 8, 1997	Memphis	United States	Mid-South Coliseum	Helmet	—N/a	—N/a
April 9, 1997	Little Rock	United States	Barton Coliseum	Helmet and Rasputina	—N/a	—N/a
April 12, 1997	Biloxi	United States	Mississippi Coast Coliseum	Helmet and Rasputina	—N/a	—N/a
April 13, 1997	Atlanta	United States	International Ballroom	Helmet and Rasputina	3,077 / 3,500	$69,233
April 15, 1997	Orlando	United States	UCF Arena	Helmet and Rasputina	2,494 / 3,000	$52,374
April 16, 1997	West Palm Beach	United States	West Palm Beach Auditorium	Helmet and Rasputina	—N/a	—N/a
April 17, 1997	Jacksonville	United States	Jacksonville Memorial Coliseum	Helmet and Rasputina	—N/a	—N/a
April 19, 1997	Winston-Salem	United States	Lawrence Joel Veterans Memorial Coliseum	Helmet and Rasputina	—N/a	—N/a
April 22, 1997	Evansville	United States	Roberts Municipal Stadium	Helmet and Rasputina	2,970 / 4,700	$74,250
April 23, 1997	Louisville	United States	Louisville Gardens	Helmet and Rasputina	—N/a	—N/a
April 25, 1997	Saginaw	United States	Wendler Arena	Helmet and Rasputina	—N/a	—N/a
April 26, 1997	Cleveland	United States	CSU Convocation Center	Helmet and Rasputina	6,420 / 7,500	$125,810
April 29, 1997	Fort Wayne	United States	Fort Wayne Coliseum	Helmet and Rasputina	3,853 / 5,000	$79,199
April 30, 1997	Kalamazoo	United States	Wings Stadium	Helmet and Rasputina	4,739 / 5,000	$93,771
May 2, 1997	Hamilton	Canada	Copps Coliseum	Helmet and Rasputina	4,632 / 5,000	$113,745
May 3, 1997	Erie	United States	Erie Civic Center	Helmet and Rasputina	2,557 / 4,000	$51,179
May 4, 1997	Pittsburgh	United States	Civic Center	Helmet and Rasputina	3,740 / 5,000	$73,575
May 6, 1997	Utica	United States	Utica Memorial Auditorium	Rasputina	—N/a	—N/a
May 7, 1997	Hartford	United States	The Meadows	Rasputina	—N/a	—N/a
May 9, 1997	Washington, D.C.	United States	D.C. Armory	Rasputina	—N/a	—N/a
May 10, 1997	Richmond	United States	Richmond Coliseum	Rasputina	3,283 / 4,000	$65,660
May 11, 1997	Camden	United States	Blockbuster-Sony E-Centre	Rasputina	—N/a	—N/a
Leg 5: European festival tour 1997
May 17, 1997	Landgraaf	Netherlands	Pinkpop Festival	Rasputina	—N/a	—N/a
May 18, 1997	Eindhoven	Netherlands	Dynamo Open Air	Rasputina	—N/a	—N/a
May 19, 1997	Newport	United Kingdom	Newport Civic Centre	Pist.on	—N/a	—N/a
May 20, 1997	London	United Kingdom	Brixton Academy	Pist.on	—N/a	—N/a
May 22, 1997	Manchester	United Kingdom	Manchester Apollo	Pist.on	—N/a	—N/a
May 23, 1997	Glasgow	United Kingdom	Barrowland Ballroom	Pist.on	—N/a	—N/a
May 25, 1997	Wolverhampton	United Kingdom	Wolverhampton Civic Hall	Pist.on	—N/a	—N/a
May 26, 1997	Leeds	United Kingdom	Town & Country	Pist.on	—N/a	—N/a
May 27, 1997	Nottingham	United Kingdom	Rock City	Pist.on	—N/a	—N/a
May 29, 1997	Paris	France	Le Bataclan	Pist.on	—N/a	—N/a
May 31, 1997	Barcelona	Spain	Zeleste	Pist.on	—N/a	—N/a
June 1, 1997	Madrid	Spain	La Rivera	Pist.on	—N/a	—N/a
June 2, 1997	Valencia	Spain	Arena	Pist.on	—N/a	—N/a
June 4, 1997	Milan	Italy	Rolling Stone	Pist.on	—N/a	—N/a
Leg 6: Ozzfest 1997
June 13, 1997	Providence	United States	The Strand	Pist.on	—N/a	—N/a
June 15, 1997	East Rutherford	United States	Giants Stadium	none	—N/a	—N/a
June 17, 1997	Columbus	United States	Polaris Amphitheater	none	19,800 / 19,800	$562,240
June 18, 1997	Clarkston	United States	Pine Knob	Thrill Kill Kult	10,944 / 13,409	$202,833
June 19, 1997	Tinley Park	United States	The World	none	18,475 / 25,000	$510,690
June 21, 1997	East Troy	United States	Alpine Valley Music Theatre	none	31,930 / 31,930	$774,345
June 22, 1997	Minneapolis	United States	Hubert H. Humphrey Metrodome	none	—N/a	—N/a
June 24, 1997	Denver	United States	Mile High Stadium	none	—N/a	—N/a
June 26, 1997	Phoenix	United States	Desert Sky Pavilion	none	—N/a	—N/a
June 28, 1997	Whitney	United States	Sam Boyd Stadium	none	—N/a	—N/a
June 29, 1997	San Bernardino	United States	Blockbuster Pavilion San Bernardino	none	—N/a	—N/a
Leg 7: Canadian tour 1997
July 18, 1997	Barrie	Canada	Molson Park	Powerman 5000	—N/a	—N/a
July 20, 1997	Burlington	Canada	Memorial Auditorium	Powerman 5000	—N/a	—N/a
July 23, 1997	Vancouver	Canada	PNE Forum	Powerman 5000	—N/a	—N/a
July 26, 1997	Edmonton	Canada	Convention Centre	Powerman 5000	—N/a	—N/a
July 28, 1997	Winnipeg	Canada	Walker Theatre	Powerman 5000	—N/a	—N/a
July 31, 1997	Toronto	Canada	Varsity Arena	Powerman 5000	—N/a	—N/a
August 1, 1997	Ottawa	Canada	Congress Centre	Powerman 5000	—N/a	—N/a
August 2, 1997	Montreal	Canada	The Medley	Powerman 5000	—N/a	—N/a
Leg 8: European/South American/Mexican tour 1997
Europe
August 9, 1997	Zambujeira do Mar	Portugal	Festival Sudoeste	none	—N/a	—N/a
August 10, 1997	Madrid	Spain	La Rivera	none	—N/a	—N/a
August 11, 1997	Paris	France	Le Bataclan	none	—N/a	—N/a
August 13, 1997	Rome	Italy	Palaghiaccio di Marino	none	—N/a	—N/a
August 15, 1997	Leipzig	Germany	Haus Auensee	none	—N/a	—N/a
August 16, 1997	Cologne	Germany	Bizarre Festival	none	—N/a	—N/a
August 18, 1997	Berlin	Germany	Huxleys	none	—N/a	—N/a
August 20, 1997	Hamburg	Germany	Grosse Freiheit 36	none	—N/a	—N/a
August 22, 1997	Hasselt	Belgium	Pukkelpop Festival	none	—N/a	—N/a
August 23, 1997	Stuttgart	Germany	Blindman's Ball in Cannstatter Wasen	none	—N/a	—N/a
August 24, 1997	Reading	United Kingdom	Reading Festival	none	—N/a	—N/a
South America
September 8, 1997	São Paulo	Brazil	Vila Olímpia	none	—N/a	—N/a
September 11, 1997	Buenos Aires	Argentina	José Amalfitani Stadium	none	—N/a	—N/a
September 12, 1997	Buenos Aires	Argentina	José Amalfitani Stadium	none	—N/a	—N/a
September 14, 1997	Santiago	Chile	Central Court National Stadium	none	—N/a	—N/a
North America
September 16, 1997	Mexico City	Mexico	Palacio de los Deportes	Hocico	—N/a	—N/a

=== Cancelled or rescheduled shows ===
List of cancelled concerts, showing date, city, country, venue and reason for cancellation
Date	City	Country	Venue	Reason
Leg 1: Europe 1996
November 27, 1996	Stockholm	Sweden	Studion	Cancelled
Leg 2: North American tour 1996–1997
January 11, 1997	Salt Lake City	United States	Utah State Fairpark	Cancelled by venue CEO. Venue moved to Wolf Mountain in Park City after lawsuit against State of Utah by fans.
February 2, 1997	Las Cruces	United States	Pan American Center	Cancelled due to lack of security.
Leg 4: Arena tour 1997
April 11, 1997	Jackson	United States	Mississippi Coliseum	Technical issues. Tickets honored in Biloxi.
April 20, 1997	Columbia	United States	Columbia Coliseum	Manson concert banned by South Carolina House of Representatives from state property. Band paid $40,000 not to play.
Leg 5: European festival tour 1997
June 5, 1997	Munich	Germany	Babylon	Postponed to August 17.
June 6, 1997	Düsseldorf	Germany	Tor 3	Cancelled
June 8, 1997	Frankfurt	Germany	Batschkapp	Cancelled
June 9, 1997	Berlin	Germany	Huxleys	Postponed to August 18
June 10, 1997	Hamburg	Germany	Grünspan Club	Postponed to August 20. Venue changed to Grosse Freiheit 36
June 12, 1997	Hultsfred	Sweden	Hultsfred Festival	Cancelled
Leg 7: Canadian tour 1997
July 22, 1997	Portland	United States	La Luna	Unable to obtain insurance.
July 25, 1997	Calgary	Canada	Max Bell Arena	Cancelled by venue owner. Venue later successfully sued by the band for $66,000.
Leg 8: Europe 1997
August 17, 1997	Munich	Germany	Babylon	Cancelled after Manson contracted food poisoning.

== Personnel ==
- Marilyn Manson: Vocals, rhythm guitar (during Dried up, Tied and Dead to the World & The Minute of Decay), pan flute (during Kinderfeld)
- Zim Zum: Guitar
- Twiggy Ramirez: Bass
- Madonna Wayne Gacy: Keyboards
- Ginger Fish: Drums
