= The Last Tour on Earth =

Live album by Marilyn Manson
- Released: November 12, 1999
- Recorded: 1998–1999
- Genres: Industrial metal; industrial rock
- Length: 69:03
- Labels: Nothing; Interscope
- Producer: Marilyn Manson

Marilyn Manson chronology
Mechanical Animals (1998)	The Last Tour on Earth (1999)	Holy Wood (In the Shadow of the Valley of Death) (2000)

Professional ratings
Review scores
Source	Rating
AllMusic	2.5/5 stars
Billboard	(Favorable)
NME	8/10 stars
Rolling Stone	3/5 stars

The Last Tour on Earth is a live album comprising recordings from Marilyn Manson's Mechanical Animals Tour, Beautiful Monsters Tour and Rock is Dead Tour, released on November 12, 1999. On the studio version of "The Dope Show", Manson says that drugs "are made in California", but in the live version, he says that "drugs, they say, are made right here in Cleveland", to a roar of crowd approval, suggesting that the song was recorded in Cleveland, Ohio. "Lunchbox" was recorded in Grand Rapids, Michigan, and "I Don't Like the Drugs (But the Drugs Like Me)" was recorded in Cedar Rapids, Iowa. "The Last Day on Earth" was recorded in Las Vegas on the Mechanical Animals Tour, and "Get Your Gunn" was recorded some time during the Rock is Dead Tour.

"Rock is Dead" is introduced as if Omega and the Mechanical Animals, the alter-egos Manson and his band devised for the Mechanical Animals album and tour, were playing. Some of the tracks, most notably "I Don't Like the Drugs (But the Drugs Like Me)", are prefaced with spoken diatribes.

The album includes one new studio track, "Astonishing Panorama of the Endtimes", which also appears on the Celebrity Deathmatch soundtrack. A promotional single was released for Celebrity Deathmatch but never commercially released.

Although extensive amounts of performance footage was captured (partially shown in the 40 minute documentary God Is in the T.V.) a live DVD of this tour did not materialize.

== Accolades ==
In 2006, sister British magazines Classic Rock & Metal Hammer included The Last Tour on Earth (mislabeled The Last Show on Earth) in The 200 Greatest Albums of the 90s.

== Track listing ==
No.	Title	Original album	Length
1.	"Inauguration of the Mechanical Christ" (Intro)		2:45
2.	"The Reflecting God"	Antichrist Superstar	5:32
3.	"Great Big White World"	Mechanical Animals	5:21
4.	"Get Your Gunn"	Portrait of an American Family	3:37
5.	"Sweet Dreams / Hell Outro"	Smells Like Children / Spawn: The Album	5:36
6.	"Rock Is Dead"	Mechanical Animals	3:20
7.	"The Dope Show"	Mechanical Animals	3:56
8.	"Lunchbox"	Portrait of an American Family	8:35
9.	"I Don't Like the Drugs (But the Drugs Like Me)"	Mechanical Animals	7:31
10.	"Antichrist Superstar"	Antichrist Superstar	5:15
11.	"The Beautiful People"	Antichrist Superstar	4:30
12.	"Irresponsible Hate Anthem"	Antichrist Superstar	4:40
13.	"The Last Day on Earth" (Acoustic)	Mechanical Animals	4:26
14.	"Astonishing Panorama of the Endtimes" (Bonus studio recording)		3:59
Total length:			69:03

=== Bonus disc ===
A 2CD limited edition was released with a bonus disc, containing three tracks exclusive to this release.

No.	Title	Notes	Length
1.	"Coma White"	from Mechanical Animals	5:41
2.	"Get My Rocks Off"	cover of Dr. Hook & The Medicine Show	5:32
3.	"Coma White" (acoustic)		5:21
4.	"A Rose and a Baby Ruth"	cover of George Hamilton IV	3:37
Total length:			16:38

== Personnel ==
- Marilyn Manson – lead vocals
- John 5 – guitars, backing vocals
- Twiggy Ramirez – bass, backing vocals
- Madonna Wayne Gacy – keyboards, backing vocals
- Ginger Fish – drums

== Charts and certifications ==
=== Weekly charts ===
Chart (1999)	Peak position
Australian Albums (ARIA)	50
Canada Albums (RPM)	30
French Albums (SNEP)	62
German Albums (Offizielle Top 100)	46
New Zealand Albums (RMNZ)	38
Scottish Albums (Official Charts)	75
Swedish Albums (Sverigetopplistan)	59
UK Albums (OCC)	61
US Billboard 200	82

=== Certifications ===
Region	Certification	Certified units/sales
United Kingdom (BPI)	Silver	60,000^{^}
^{^} Shipments figures based on certification alone.
