= Dead to the World =

Video by Marilyn Manson
- Released: February 10, 1998
- Recorded: 1995–1997
- Genre: Industrial metal; industrial rock; alternative metal
- Length: 58:54
- Label: Nothing; Interscope
- Director: Joseph F. Cultice
- Producer: Marilyn Manson

Marilyn Manson chronology
Dead to the World (1998)	God Is in the T.V. (1999)

Professional ratings
Review scores
Source	Rating
AllMusic	2.5/5 stars

Dead to the World is the first live video album by American rock band Marilyn Manson, released on February 10, 1998, on VHS, documenting the infamous tour of the same name. It contains primarily live performances but delves into backstage and archival footage of the band.

Notable features are: extensive protests by right-wing Christian groups; spoken relations of meaning and intent by Manson himself; and the brutal, immense theatrics presented by the band in the live setting. Based on Antichrist Superstar, this video features six songs from the album as well as songs from earlier releases Portrait of an American Family and Smells Like Children. Naturally, this tour reflected the album upon which it was built.

== Blurb ==
Society has traditionally always tried to find a scapegoat for its problems. Well, here I am.

— Marilyn Manson, October 1996

The controversial events from the Antichrist Superstar tour serve as the backdrop for this amazing document, all as seen through the video eye of the band's own cameraman. The picketing zealots, the fulminating moralists, the disingenuous politicians, the tens of thousands who came to see for themselves and, of course, gazing outward from the very heart of the storm, Manson himself. One hour of live concert performances intercut with behind the scene and backstage footage that will help you to understand what it must have been like to be at the center of these extraordinary occurrences.[MM]

== Track listing ==
All tracks by Marilyn Manson

1. "Angel with the Scabbed Wings"
2. "Lunchbox"
3. "Kinderfeld"
4. "Sweet Dreams (Are Made of This)"
5. "Apple of Sodom" (with Rasputina)
6. "Antichrist Superstar"
7. "The Beautiful People"
8. "My Monkey"
9. "Irresponsible Hate Anthem"
10. "Rock 'n' Roll Nigger"
11. "1996" (spoken)

== Personnel ==
- Marilyn Manson — lead vocals, rhythm guitar, pan flute
- Zim Zum — lead guitar, backing vocals
- Twiggy Ramirez — bass, backing vocals
- Madonna Wayne Gacy — keyboards
- Ginger Fish — drums

== Re-releases ==
Manson stated in November 2005 that he was interested in re-releasing Dead to the World and its follow-up God Is in the T.V. on DVD.

== Certifications ==
Region	Certification	Certified units/sales
Canada (Music Canada)	Gold	5,000^{^}
^{^} Shipments figures based on certification alone.
