= Rock Is Dead Tour =

1999 concert tour by Marilyn Manson

Rock is Dead
- Tour by Marilyn Manson
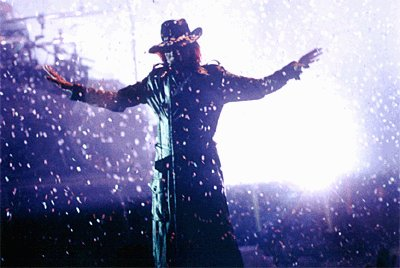
- Associated album: Mechanical Animals
- Start date: March 21, 1999
- End date: August 8, 1999
- No. of shows: 46 (planned); 43 (completed)

Marilyn Manson concert chronology
- Beautiful Monsters (1999); Rock Is Dead (1999); Guns, God and Government (2000–2001)

Rock Is Dead was a worldwide arena tour by American rock band Marilyn Manson in 1999. It was the second tour launched in support of their third full-length studio LP, Mechanical Animals, which was released on September 15, 1998.

The tour was a rebranding of the Marilyn Manson and Hole co-headlined Beautiful Monsters tour. While it was initially successful, Beautiful Monsters was marked by numerous and well-publicized fracases between the frontperson of each band on and off-stage. The discord caused a fallout between the two groups which resulted in Hole's departure from the playbill. Marilyn Manson decided to continue the tour and gave the opening act, Monster Magnet, equal billing as co-headliner for Rock is Dead.

Marilyn Manson released two recordings that documented portions of the tour: a live video album titled God Is in the T.V. and a live album titled The Last Tour on Earth.

== Background and development ==
We're history after this. You'll get to see the crack of someone's ass (a reference to Manson's habit of dropping his pants onstage). It will be fun.

— Courtney Love, announcing their withdrawal from the Beautiful Monsters Tour.

After a series of public spats between the extremely outspoken lead vocalists of Hole and Marilyn Manson during their joint Beautiful Monsters Tour, Hole vocalist Courtney Love officially announced their withdrawal on March 14, 1999, as they took the stage at The Forum arena. They went on to do a series of shows in North America before leaving for the United Kingdom to join the Glastonbury Festival.

During Marilyn Manson's performance on the night of Hole's departure, he sustained a hairline fracture to one of his ankles while jumping between platforms on stage. His injury caused the tour to be temporarily suspended while he recuperated. The March 16, 1999 San Diego, California concert was cancelled while the March 17, 1999 Las Vegas, Nevada and March 18, 1999 Phoenix, Arizona engagements were postponed to a later date. In spite of the highly publicized animosity, Manson insisted Hole's departure was "not a personal thing."

The tour resumed on March 21, 1999, rebranded as the Rock Is Dead Tour after the Marilyn Manson single "Rock Is Dead", despite the fact that the name was already being used by American rock bands Korn and Rob Zombie for their own concurrent joint US tour, the Rock is Dead! Tour. This led to a minor dispute that was quickly resolved by both parties. Manson kept all of the remaining scheduled engagements intact.

Now exercising full control over the tour's itinerary, Manson immediately withdrew Imperial Teen's billing in favor of Grammy-nominated American psychobilly band Nashville Pussy, who took over the opening act slot from Monster Magnet beginning from the April 2, 1999 concert at the Memorial Coliseum in Winston-Salem, North Carolina until the completion of all North American dates on the tour. Manson explained to MTV that the initial inclusion of Imperial Teen on the tour was "by Courtney's request. I think we're probably better off, because that would've been an additional torment for our fans that they didn't need." He added that while he enjoyed their music on CD, he felt there was too much difference in their musical and performance approach for their continued inclusion on the tour to work.

Fellow Floridians and longtime friends of the band Jack Off Jill joined Manson's tour for four dates from March 25, 1999, at the Uno Arena in New Orleans until March 30, 1999, at the National Car Center Arena in their shared hometown of Fort Lauderdale, Florida, for both groups' homecoming concert.

== Performance and show themes ==
The shows began with Manson entering last, among the band, affixed to a metal crucifix made out of television sets. For this introduction, the short instrumental track "Inauguration of the Mechanical Christ" was crafted to play in the background as the TV crucifix rose from the understage. Once the complete band began the first song, the crucifix was set ablaze.

Marilyn Manson wore a police officer's uniform during "Irresponsible Hate Anthem" and as a finale, Manson's backup singer would arrive as a second officer with a shotgun. The shotgun would fire into Manson's back, splattering blood unto the crowd. With Manson having been 'murdered', his body would be dragged from the stage.

During performances of the song "Antichrist Superstar", the rostrum used on the Dead to the World Tour whenever the song was performed was reused. This led to a slight controversy during what was to be the original final North American tour date. During the Cedar Rapids, Iowa, show, Marilyn Manson was surprised to find the Antichrist Superstar logo on his rostrum had been replaced with a smiley face which prompted the lead singer to walk offstage and not return.

Set props included a massive lit sign spelling D-R-U-G-S, as well as golden confetti fired often from cannons.

== Incidents ==
Following the aftermath of the Columbine High School massacre in Littleton, Colorado, the band canceled the remaining dates of the tour out of respect for the victims, explaining, "It's not a great atmosphere to be out playing rock 'n' roll shows, for us or the fans." However, Manson steadfastly maintained that music, movies, books or video games are not to blame, stating,

The [news] media has unfairly scapegoated the music industry and so-called Goth kids and has speculated, with no basis in truth, that artists like myself are in some way to blame. This tragedy was a product of ignorance, hatred and an access to guns. I hope the [news] media's irresponsible finger-pointing doesn't create more discrimination against kids who look different.

=== Columbine High School massacre and its immediate aftermath ===
I think there's something going on that you can't see from the outside ... his whole thing is part of a drug-cultural type of thing, with a subculture of violence and killing and hatred, and anti-family values, anti-traditional values, anti-authority ... We're having an alarming rate of killings in schools, and youth violence and an increase in drugs. I would say that though they're not all to be blamed on a shock entertainer like Marilyn Manson, I think he promotes it and can be part of the blame.

— Michigan State Senator Dale Shugars' concerns on the influence of Marilyn Manson on concert-goers.

On April 20, 1999, Columbine High School students Eric Harris and Dylan Klebold shot dead 12 students and a teacher and wounded 21 others, before committing suicide. In the aftermath of the school shooting, the band were widely reported to have influenced the killings; early media reports alleged that the shooters were fans, and were wearing the group's T-shirts during the massacre. Although these claims were later proven to be false (through tapes recorded by the perpetrators), speculation in national media and among the public continued to blame Manson's music and imagery for inciting Harris and Klebold. Later reports revealed that the two were not fans—and, on the contrary, had disliked the band's music. Despite this, Marilyn Manson (as well as other bands and forms of entertainment, such as movies and video games) were widely criticized by religious, political, and entertainment-industry figures.

A day after the shooting, Michigan State Senator Dale Shugars attended the band's concert, along with policy advisers, a local police officer and the state senate's sergeant-at-arms, at the Van Andel Arena in Grand Rapids, Michigan to conduct research for a proposed bill requiring parental warnings on concert tickets and promotional material for any performer that had released a record bearing the Parental Advisory sticker in the last five years. According to Shugars, the show began with the singer wearing "satanic wings" as he leapt from a cross that was eventually set on fire. He then described seeing fans, whom he described as normal kids, "under [Manson's] control" as he performed a sequence that "glorified the killing of a police officer." Finally, he reported the singer recounting a dream sequence in which cops perform sex acts on him before Jesus Christ descended out of a sky made of LSD and told him the real name of God is "Drugs." After which, the band launched into "I Don't Like the Drugs (But the Drugs Like Me)". Shugars expressed concern that these shows had adverse effects on concert-goers.

On April 25, 1999, longtime music industry critics, Republican former Secretary of Education William Bennett and Democrat US Senator Joseph Lieberman called the group a contributing factor to the massacre during their appearance on Meet the Press. Three days later, the city of Fresno, California passed a unanimous resolution condemning "Marilyn Manson or any other negative entertainer who encourages anger and hate upon the community as an offensive threat to the children of this community." Its author, Councilman Henry Perea, justified the resolution pointing out that people would face arrest if they publicly "engaged in some of the same behaviors that [Manson] demonstrates onstage" In Portsmouth, New Hampshire, students were barred from wearing Marilyn Manson T-shirts in school premises.

He or she or whatever the case might be realizes that he can be tremendously booed and that his work is tremendously offensive.

— US Senator Orrin Hatch's conjecture on why the band decided to abandon the rest of their US tour.

On April 29, ten US senators (led by Sam Brownback of Kansas) sent a letter to Edgar Bronfman Jr. – the president of Seagram (the owner of Interscope) – requesting a voluntary halt to his company's distribution to children of "music that glorifies violence". The letter named Marilyn Manson for producing songs which "eerily reflect" the actions of Harris and Klebold. The signatories included eight Republicans and two Democrats namely, US Senators Wayne Allard, Ben Nighthorse Campbell, Susan Collins, Tim Hutchinson, Rick Santorum, Kent Conrad, Byron Dorgan, John Ashcroft and Jeff Sessions. Later that day, the band cancelled their remaining North American shows. Two days later, Manson published his response to these accusations in an op-ed piece for Rolling Stone, titled "Columbine: Whose Fault Is It?", where he castigated America's gun culture, the political influence of the National Rifle Association of America, and the media's irresponsible coverage, which he said facilitated the placing of blame on a scapegoat, instead of debating more relevant societal issues.

On May 4, a hearing on the marketing and distribution of violent content to minors by the television, music, film and video-game industries was held by the United States Senate Committee on Commerce, Science and Transportation. The committee heard testimony from former Secretary of Education and Empower America co-founder William Bennett, the Archbishop of Denver Charles J. Chaput, professors and mental-health professionals. Speakers criticized the band, its label-mate Nine Inch Nails, and the 1999 film The Matrix for their alleged contribution to a cultural environment enabling violence such as the Columbine shootings. The committee requested that the Federal Trade Commission and the United States Department of Justice investigate the entertainment industry's marketing practices to minors. The CEOs of four of the world's largest music distributors declined the invitation to attend. Bennett denounced their absence and said it amounted to a "[p]ublic shaming. My hunch is they will continue to ignore you like they did today." Outside observers such as Nina Crowley, director of the anti-censorship organization Mass Mic, expressed chagrin regarding the hearings, commenting that it was "a very stacked-looking thing." Hilary Rosen, president and CEO of the RIAA, shared this opinion and thought "it was staged as political theater [...] They just wanted to find a way to shame the industry, and I'm not ashamed."

Senators Brownback, Hatch and Lieberman concluded the proceedings by requesting an investigation from the Federal Trade Commission and the United States Department of Justice on marketing practices of the entertainment industry to minors. The following month, President Bill Clinton granted that request lamenting that "kids steeped in the culture of violence do become desensitized to it and more capable of committing it." The release of the FTC report on September 13, led Lieberman, by then the vice presidential candidate on the Democratic ticket, and Hillary Clinton to introduce the Media Marketing Accountability Act of 2001 before the 107th United States Congress. This legislation proposed to ban the entertainment-industry from marketing suspected violent or explicit material to minors.

After concluding the European and Japanese legs of their tour on August 8, the band withdrew from public view. Manson entered into a three-month period of seclusion at his home in the Hollywood Hills, during which he considered how to respond to the Columbine controversy. Manson said the maelstrom made him re-evaluate his career: "There was a bit of trepidation, [in] deciding: 'Is it worth it? Are people understanding what I'm trying to say? Am I even gonna be allowed to say it?' Because I definitely had every single door shut in my face ... there were not a lot of people who stood behind me." He told Alternative Press that he felt his safety was threatened to the point that he "could be shot Mark David Chapman-style." He nevertheless found solace in writing new music which resulted in the band's 2000 album Holy Wood (In the Shadow of the Valley of Death). The singer described this record as his "counterattack."

== Recordings ==
Marilyn Manson released a live video album on November 2, 1999, titled God Is in the T.V. that contained rare and unreleased footage including a behind-the-scenes backstage look at some of the experiences the band underwent during the Rock Is Dead Tour. He also released a live album on November 12, 1999, titled The Last Tour on Earth that documented curated performances by his band from various concerts during the tour.

== Lineup ==
Marilyn Manson

- Marilyn Manson: Vocals
- John 5: Guitar
- Twiggy Ramirez: Bass
- Madonna Wayne Gacy: Keyboards
- Ginger Fish: Drums

== Set List ==
=== North America ===
1. "Inauguration of the Mechanical Christ"
2. "The Reflecting God"
3. "Great Big White World"
4. "Get Your Gunn"
5. "Mechanical Animals"
6. "Sweet Dreams (Are Made of This)" / "Long Hard Road Out of Hell" (Outro)
7. "The Speed of Pain"
8. "Rock is Dead"
9. "The Dope Show"
10. "Lunchbox"
11. "I Don't Like the Drugs (But the Drugs Like Me)"
12. "Irresponsible Hate Anthem"
13. "Antichrist Superstar"
14. "The Beautiful People"

=== Europe/Asia ===
1. "Inauguration of the Mechanical Christ"
2. "The Reflecting God"
3. "Great Big White World"
4. "Cake and Sodomy"
5. "Sweet Dreams (Are Made of This)" / "Long Hard Road Out of Hell" (Outro)
6. "Astonishing Panorama of the Endtimes"
7. "Rock is Dead"
8. "The Dope Show"
9. "Lunchbox"
10. "I Don't Like the Drugs (But the Drugs Like Me)"
11. "Rock N Roll Nigger"
12. "The Beautiful People"

== Tour dates ==
List of concerts, showing date, city, country, venue and opening act
Date	City	Country	Venue	Opening Act(s)	Attendance	Revenue
Leg 1 — North America
21 March 1999	Houston	United States	The Summit (aka Compaq Center)	Monster Magnet	—N/a	—N/a
22 March 1999	San Antonio	United States	Alamodome	Monster Magnet	—N/a	—N/a
23 March 1999	Dallas	United States	Reunion Arena	Monster Magnet	—N/a	—N/a
25 March 1999	New Orleans	United States	UNO Arena	Jack Off Jill	3,286 / 5,000	$123,533
27 March 1999	Tampa	United States	Ice Palace	Jack Off Jill	4,564 / 14,265	$127,117
29 March 1999	Orlando	United States	Orlando Arena	Jack Off Jill	3,781 / 17,585	$106,790
30 March 1999	Fort Lauderdale	United States	National Car Rental Center Arena	Jack Off Jill	—N/a	—N/a
2 April 1999	Winston-Salem	United States	Winston-Salem Memorial Coliseum	Nashville Pussy	—N/a	—N/a
3 April 1999	Fairfax	United States	Patriot Center	Nashville Pussy	5,062 / 9,500	$164,190
4 April 1999	Philadelphia	United States	First Union Spectrum	Nashville Pussy	7,094 / 9,000	$209,273
6 April 1999	East Rutherford	United States	Meadowlands Sports Complex	Nashville Pussy	—N/a	—N/a
7 April 1999	Uniondale	United States	Nassau Veterans Memorial Coliseum	Nashville Pussy	—N/a	—N/a
9 April 1999	Worcester	United States	The Centrum	Nashville Pussy	8,135 / 11,491	$225,350
10 April 1999	New Haven	United States	New Haven Coliseum	Nashville Pussy	—N/a	—N/a
11 April 1999	Buffalo	United States	Marine Midland Arena	Nashville Pussy	—N/a	—N/a
13 April 1999	Cleveland	United States	CSU Arena	Nashville Pussy	5,118 / 7,000	$150,981
15 April 1999	Detroit	United States	The Palace of Auburn Hills	Nashville Pussy	—N/a	—N/a
16 April 1999	Pittsburgh	United States	Pittsburgh Arena	Nashville Pussy	6,279 / 7,315	$185,230
17 April 1999	Fort Wayne	United States	Fort Wayne Coliseum	Nashville Pussy	—N/a	—N/a
20 April 1999	Rosemont	United States	Rosemont Horizon	Nashville Pussy	—N/a	—N/a
21 April 1999	Grand Rapids	United States	Van Andel Arena	Nashville Pussy	5,676 / 6,500	$175,023
22 April 1999	Indianapolis	United States	Market Square Arena	Nashville Pussy	6,006 / 6,500	$164,699
24 April 1999	Madison	United States	Dane County Coliseum	Nashville Pussy	—N/a	—N/a
25 April 1999	Milwaukee	United States	Bradley Center	Nashville Pussy	—N/a	—N/a
27 April 1999	Minneapolis	United States	Target Center	Nashville Pussy	—N/a	—N/a
28 April 1999	Cedar Rapids	United States	Five Seasons Center	Nashville Pussy	4,635 / 7,000	$117,377
5 May 1999	Las Vegas	United States	Thomas & Mack Center	Nashville Pussy	—N/a	—N/a
7 May 1999	Phoenix	United States	Arizona Veterans Memorial Coliseum	Nashville Pussy	—N/a	—N/a
Leg 2 — Europe
18 June 1999	Hultsfred	Sweden	Hultsfred Festival	none	—N/a	—N/a
20 June 1999	Imola	Italy	Heineken Jammin' Festival	none	—N/a	—N/a
25 June 1999	Berlin	Germany	Wuhlheide	none	—N/a	—N/a
26 June 1999	Scheeßel	Germany	Hurricane Festival	none	—N/a	—N/a
27 June 1999	Munich	Germany	Southside Festival	none	—N/a	—N/a
1 July 1999	Roskilde	Denmark	Roskilde Festival	none	—N/a	—N/a
3 July 1999	Werchter	Belgium	Werchter Festival	none	—N/a	—N/a
4 July 1999	Wiesen	Austria	Forestglade Festival	none	—N/a	—N/a
7 July 1999	Kristiansand	Norway	Quart Festival	none	—N/a	—N/a
9 July 1999	Belfort	France	Eurockéennes de Belfort	none	—N/a	—N/a
10 July 1999	Milton Keynes	England	Milton Keynes Bowl	none	—N/a	—N/a
Leg 3 — Asia
2 August 1999	Fukuoka	Japan	Zepp Fukuoka	none	—N/a	—N/a
3 August 1999	Fukuoka	Japan	Zepp Fukuoka	none	—N/a	—N/a
7 August 1999	Fuji-Yoshida	Japan	Fuji-Q Highland Conifer Forest Festival	none	—N/a	—N/a
8 August 1999	Fuji-Yoshida	Japan	Fuji-Q Highland Conifer Forest Festival	none	—N/a	—N/a
