= God Is in the TV (video) =

Video by Marilyn Manson
- Released: November 2, 1999
- Recorded: July 1994 – November 1999
- Genre: Glam rock; alternative metal; industrial rock
- Length: 44:28 (tour documentary)
- Label: Nothing; Interscope
- Director: Marilyn Manson; Perou; Samuel Bayer; Paul Hunter; Matthew Rolston; E. Elias Merhige; W.I.Z.; Floria Sigismondi; Dean Karr; Tom Stern; Richard Kern; Rod Chong

Marilyn Manson chronology
Dead to the World (1998)	God Is in the TV (1999)	Guns, God and Government (2002)

Professional ratings
Review scores
Source	Rating
AllMusic	3/5 stars

God Is in the TV is the second live video album by American rock band Marilyn Manson, released on November 2, 1999, on VHS, documenting the Mechanical Animals Tour, Beautiful Monsters Tour and Rock Is Dead Tour. It features all 13 music videos the band spawned between July 1994 and November 1999 in reverse chronology, including uncensored bonus footage from the production of "The Dope Show" music video, as well as footage culled from various concerts around the world alongside backstage and behind-the-scenes clips.

== Track listing ==
Music videos:

1. "Coma White" (dir. Samuel Bayer)
2. "Rock Is Dead" (dir. Samuel Bayer)
3. "I Don't Like the Drugs (But the Drugs Like Me)" (dir. Paul Hunter)
4. "The Dope Show" (dir. Paul Hunter)
5. "Long Hard Road Out of Hell" (dir. Matthew Rolston)
6. "Cryptorchid" (dir. E. Elias Merhige)
7. "Man That You Fear" (dir. W.I.Z.)
8. "Tourniquet" (dir. Floria Sigismondi)
9. "The Beautiful People" (dir. Floria Sigismondi)
10. "Sweet Dreams (Are Made of This)" (dir. Dean Karr)
11. "Dope Hat" (dir. Tom Stern)
12. "Lunchbox" (dir. Richard Kern)
13. "Get Your Gunn" (dir. Rod Chong)
14. Uncensored Footage of "The Dope Show"

Live concert and backstage footage: (dir. Marilyn Manson and Perou)

1. "Inauguration of the Mechanical Christ"
2. "The Reflecting God"
3. "Antichrist Superstar"
4. "Irresponsible Hate Anthem"
5. "The Beautiful People"
6. "Rock Is Dead"
7. "The Dope Show"
8. "Lunchbox"
9. "I Don't Like the Drugs (But the Drugs Like Me)"
10. "The Speed of Pain"
11. "Spine of God" (with Monster Magnet)
12. "Sweet Dreams / Hell Outro"
13. "Rock n Roll Nigger"

== Personnel ==
- Marilyn Manson - lead vocals, rhythm guitar, pan flute
- John 5 - lead guitar, backing vocals
- Twiggy Ramirez - bass, backing vocals
- Madonna Wayne Gacy - keyboards
- Ginger Fish - drums

== Re-releases ==
Manson stated in November 2005 that he was interested in re-releasing God Is in the TV and its predecessor Dead to the World on DVD. Nothing has surfaced so far.
