= Beautiful Monsters Tour =

1999 concert tour by Hole and Marilyn Manson

Beautiful Monsters
- North American tour by Hole and Marilyn Manson
- Promotional poster for the March 11, 1999 performance of the Beautiful Monsters Tour
- Location: United States and Canada
- Associated album: Celebrity Skin and Mechanical Animals
- Start date: February 28, 1999
- End date: March 14, 1999
- Legs: 1
- No. of shows: 9 in North America
Hole tour chronology
- Live Through This
- (1994–1995)
- Beautiful Monsters
- (1999)
- Summer 1999
- (1999)
Marilyn Manson tour chronology
- Mechanical Animals
- (1998–1999)
- Beautiful Monsters
- (1999)
- Rock Is Dead
- (1999)

The Beautiful Monsters Tour was a North American concert tour co-headlined by American rock bands Hole and Marilyn Manson. Launched in support of each band's respective third full-length studio LPs, 1998's Celebrity Skin and Mechanical Animals, (Note: Both albums also shared the same record producer, Michael Beinhorn.) the tour was planned to run from February 28, 1999, until April 27, with 37 shows confirmed. However, due to a highly publicized altercation between the bands' respective lead vocalists, the tour only visited arenas until March 14, for a total of 9 shows before Hole withdrew from the bill. The tour garnered a large amount of media attention and was billed by MTV as a "potentially volatile mix" due to the public feud between each band's outspoken vocalist.

The co-headlining tour was conceived by Hole's management company, Q Prime. Hole singer Courtney Love teased the press that she aimed to launch a tour with Canadian singer-songwriter Alanis Morissette. However, Hole's management aggressively pursued Marilyn Manson's eponymous band, even amid a public feud stemming from Manson's depiction of Love in his autobiography The Long Hard Road Out of Hell. Nevertheless, the groups agreed to tour together, provided that costs and revenue were split 50/50.

The tour was marred by on–and–off stage exchanges between Love and Manson. Private disputes also arose over the tour's financial arrangements; Hole was obligated to finance half of the tour's production costs, though Manson's costs were disproportionately higher than Hole's. After Hole left, Marilyn Manson continued the tour under the name Rock Is Dead. Marilyn Manson released two recordings that documented portions of the tour: a live video album titled God Is in the T.V. and a live album titled The Last Tour on Earth. Love and Manson finally reconciled their differences in 2015, more than 15 years after the end of the tour.

== Background and development ==
Plans for a joint tour were conceived by Hole's management company, Q Prime, during the band's stint at the 1999 Big Day Out music festival in Australia in order to support their third studio album Celebrity Skin. Hole guitarist Eric Erlandson admitted that the band itself had "anxiously been awaiting" their first full-scale U.S. tour for some time, but their previous attempts "kept falling apart because we couldn't find someone to tour with". Erlandson said he was "just psyched to hit the road with anybody". Hole frontwoman Courtney Love toyed with the idea of touring with Canadian pop rock singer-songwriter Alanis Morissette in the press. During an interview on Los Angeles radio station KROQ-FM, Love claimed her opinions on Morissette had changed. She had previously maligned Morissette's pop work as being "too commercial [for Morissette] to ever be considered a genuine feminist symbol". Nevertheless, Love, who was one of the most prominent and prolific figures of feminist music in the 1990s, began to see Morissette as a positive influence on female empowerment.

I'm not mad that he said he'd kick my ass, I just don't want to be used in the same sentence with Courtney Love.

— Excerpt of an insult Marilyn Manson gave at the expense of Love during an interview before the tour. The quote was in response to the closing lyrics of the New Radicals song "You Get What You Give", wherein both singers were pilloried.

In 1998 and 1999, Love and rock singer Marilyn Manson were engaged in a highly publicized feud and regularly traded insults with each other in the press. Love took offense to Manson's depiction of her in his autobiography The Long Hard Road Out of Hell. (Note: In the book, Manson alleged that Love "manipulatively" began a sexual relationship with Twiggy Ramirez as a means of "keeping tabs" on her former boyfriend, Trent Reznor.) In spite of their disagreement, Hole's management aggressively pursued a joint tour with Manson's eponymous rock band. Manson was initially reluctant to accept the offer. He had reservations about Love, whom he pejoratively described in an interview with NME as "an opportunist" who he felt tried to exploit his band's new-found fame to bolster hers. He noted that Love never attempted to befriend him until he had sold a million records. (Note: Complete statement: "Courtney never bothered to say hi to me until I sold a million records. She's an opportunist and I wouldn't consider her a friend ... the way she's behaved towards me in the media has seemed very exploitative. I'm not interested in being anything to her".) Love also voiced her concerns about touring with Manson, whose explicit stage shows, she felt, were potentially deleterious to her young daughter, Frances Bean. Despite their mutual hostility, Manson accepted the offer to support his band's own third studio album. He joked that he agreed to the tour because he realized "what better role models to lead the youth of America into the new millennium than us two? So it had to be done".

During their negotiations, both sides agreed that the opening act from the inaugural show until their scheduled performance on April 4 in Philadelphia would be Manson's option, stoner rock band Monster Magnet. A dispute arose on who would take over. According to Erlandson and Hole bassist Melissa Auf der Maur, the two groups had a two-hour meeting to arrive at a resolution. Manson and his band voted for early 1980s Britpop groups like Fun Boy Three and Fine Young Cannibals, while members of Hole wanted "more modern" bands. Auf der Maur noted that "we want romance and they want theater. We want love and they want shtick. We had to explain to them that those kinds of bands make them look good, but us look silly". Eventually, Manson's band ceded the selection of the subsequent opening act to Love, who chose Imperial Teen. During their negotiations, both bands agreed to split the production cost and revenue earned at each show 50/50.

== Promotion and naming ==
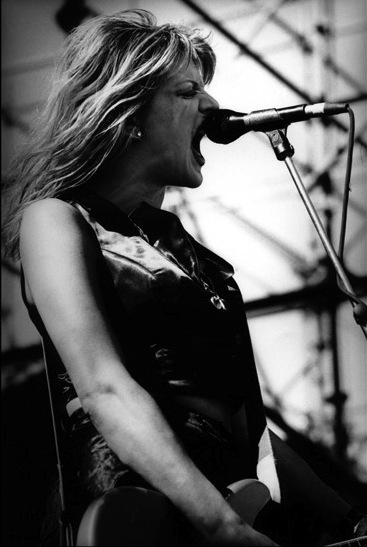
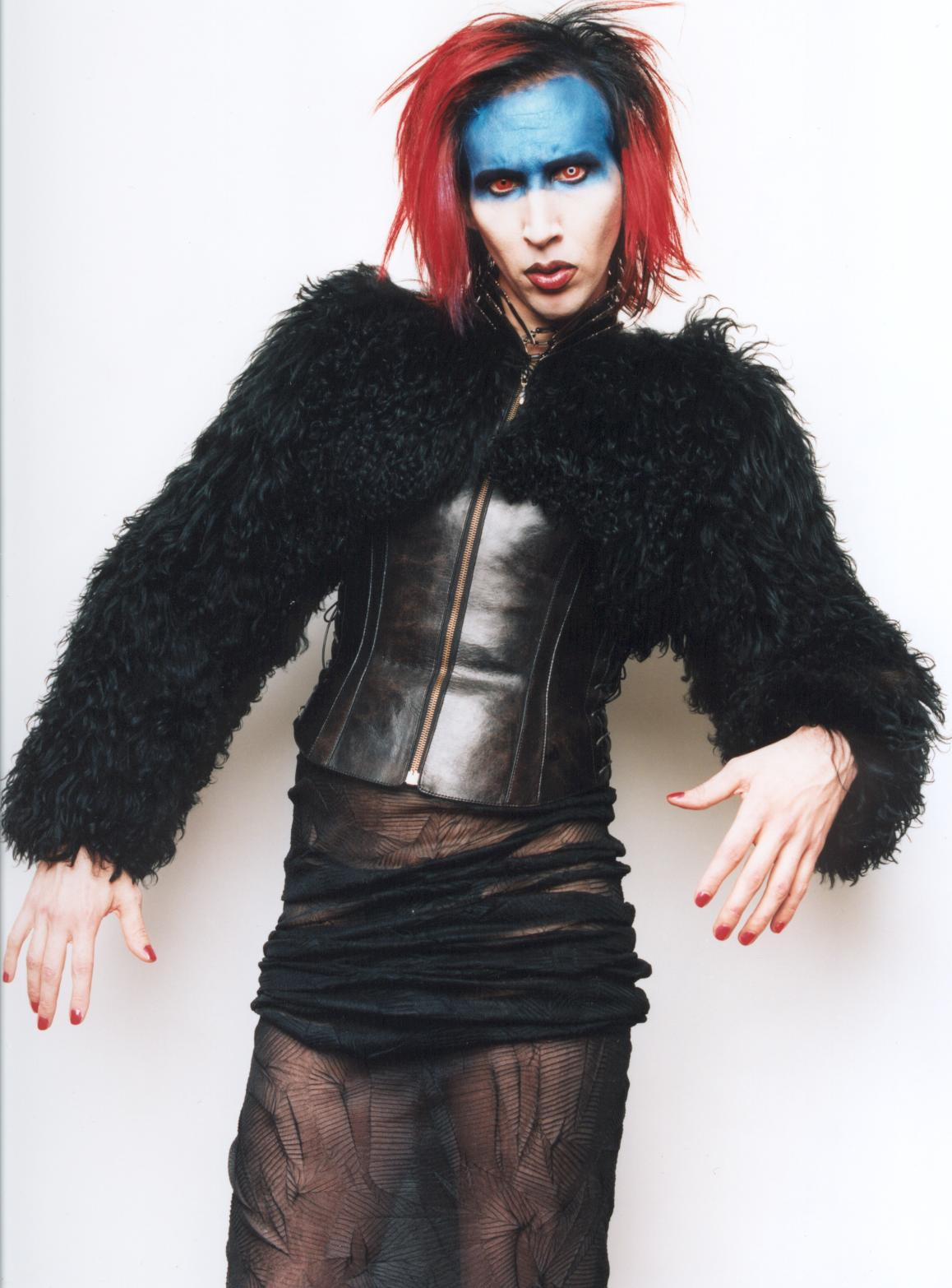
Courtney Love (left) performing with Hole at Big Day Out, Melbourne in 1995; Marilyn Manson (right) in a promotional photo for his group's album Mechanical Animals

Love officially announced Manson's attachment to the tour on January 6, 1999, by phoning in to the MTV show Total Request Live. She told host Carson Daly, "Yeah, Brian [real name of frontman Marilyn Manson] wants it", claiming that the two had reconciled and had mutual admiration. She also confirmed the lineup for each respective date on the tour. The tour was scheduled to begin on February 28, 1999, with 37 dates confirmed, spanning a total of 8 weeks. Tickets retailed for $30 and the concerts were to be hosted at 10,000-20,000 capacity venues.

The name "Beautiful Monsters" was fashioned by Auf der Maur as an acknowledgement of both band's roots in dark, angry and abrasive alternative rock music, and their transformation in sound and appearance for each of their respective third albums. The allusion also extended to the polarity between each group's approach to the change. Both bands undertook an evolution of their sound overseen by the same producer, Michael Beinhorn. Whereas Hole opted for an alternative pop update of the California sound in the L.A. tradition of bands like The Doors, The Beach Boys and The Byrds, Manson shifted to hedonistic 1970's glam rock inspired by David Bowie, T. Rex and Gary Glitter. Auf der Maur thought it "a perfect complement. We bring on the light after they've dragged out the dark. It's two different worlds, so I can't see how one could make the other look bad. Theirs is black and ours is white."

The tour was covered extensively by MTV who anticipated it being a "potentially volatile mix". They noted the "strange juxtaposing" of two bands whose extremely outspoken lead vocalists were engaged in a public row.

== Tour ==
I asked myself what is the last band in the world I would ever, ever want to tour with, and it was Hole, beyond a doubt. But then I thought, I love a challenge, I like to surround myself with aggravation, it helps me perform better. And I thought, well, here's a chance to show Courtney the difference between being a celebrity and being a real rock star. We're just going to blow her off the stage. My show will be the biggest and greatest rock show of the '90s.

— Marilyn Manson on why he joined the tour

The feud between Love and Manson carried over into their shows immediately after the tour began. They traded nightly exchanges of thinly veiled insults during their respective sets. MTV also noted the extreme difference between both band's production, set design and use of special effects. Hole opted for a minimal set design consisting of a projected backdrop and a series of garlands draped across the monitors and drum kit. Their special effects were limited to occasional use of a pressurized cannon that projected an explosion of glitter during their performance of the song "Dying", and a rain of rose petals that were dropped from the rafters onto the stage during the song "Celebrity Skin". Manson's performance, by contrast, utilized expensive pyrotechnics, elaborate props and set pieces as well as numerous costume changes. Much to Love's chagrin, the majority of concertgoers were Manson fans who were less interested in the Hole performance.

The tour commenced, as scheduled, on February 28, 1999, at the Spokane Arena in Spokane, Washington. MTV reported that the inaugural show only sold 8,500 tickets, less than half of the arena's 18,000-person capacity. Monster Magnet's opening slot lasted 45 minutes and, as noted by MTV, displayed "the same energy that made them a hit on Rob Zombie's last US tour". During Hole's performance, Love joked with the audience between songs. She also gave away two guitars and her boots to audience members. However, Hole left the stage after only 45 minutes into their show (out of a scheduled hour and a half set) due to Love's disappointment with the audience turnout. Marilyn Manson was due to perform after Hole's scheduled exit from the stage, but started 90 minutes late due to problems that arose from having to construct their complicated theatrics in a rush after Hole's impromptu walkout. (Note: Some examples of Marilyn Manson's complex stage props: 1.) During performances of "The Reflecting God" from their 1996 album Antichrist Superstar, Manson would appear onstage affixed to a large crucifix made of television sets that rose out of the ground. He would climb out and begin performing. Near the end of the song the TV crucifix was regularly set ablaze. 2.) During performances of "I Don't Like the Drugs (But the Drugs Like Me)" from Mechanical Animals, the band performed while a large Hollywood-style sign flashed the word 'DRUGS' behind them.) After the problems were resolved, they played an hour and a half show marked by deliberate destruction of their instruments and explicit onstage antics that were the band's trademark. They ended the show with a performance of their signature song "The Beautiful People" followed by an encore. (Note: The encore consisted of "Coma White" and their rendition of Patti Smith's song "Rock N Roll Nigger")

Two incidents occurred at the tour's second stop at the PNE Coliseum on March 2, 1999, in Vancouver, Canada. After Manson made a lewd remark about Love during his band's performance, Love ran onstage, hiked her dress and jumped on Manson's back while he sang. Love repeated this at the Arco Arena in Sacramento on March 11, 1999. Later in the Vancouver show, Manson suffered from dizziness and fainted onstage, injuring his hand on a monitor as he fell. Initially he pretended it was part of the show, but left the stage after performing their signature song to seek medical attention. When he returned onstage, he pulled the plugs off of their instrument amplifiers and stormed offstage without performing an encore. The rest of the band left the stage afterward.

The Seattle show on March 3, 1999, at the KeyArena included Manson's then-fiancée Rose McGowan and Pearl Jam frontman Eddie Vedder in the audience. It was also a homecoming concert for Hole. Love had mixed feelings about returning to Seattle, which was where she and her late husband Kurt Cobain settled to live as a family shortly before he committed suicide in 1994. It was also the epicenter of the grunge music scene and close to the riot grrrl scene of nearby Olympia, Washington, genres with which Hole were often misidentified during its early history. On the return to Seattle, Love lightheartedly quipped:

"Grunge is dead. Grunge is over, okay everyone? I'm here, and we're here to soothe [things] and to help everyone move through this. And it was like the grunge receptacle."

Press speculation on Hole's departure from the tour began on March 11, 1999, the day after the tour's sixth show at the Arco Arena in Sacramento, California. Manson had renamed the tour "Hole is Dead" on his official website as a taunt which exacerbated conjecture. He also prefaced the show with an interview in the San Francisco Chronicle who asked him jokingly if any cows were going to be sacrificed during the concert. He facetiously remarked, "well ... there's always Courtney".

During the concert, Love polled the audience as to whether or not they wanted her band to continue performing. After the audience responded encouragingly, she derided both Manson's use of pyrotechnics and the audience's expectations of a decadent spectacle, then justified Hole's performance approach as musically focused. (Note: Courtney Love: "I guess you're sort of waiting for the pyrotechnics show. We don't know how to do fire and stuff. We're just a rock 'n' roll band, you little shits ... We're sort of all about the music.") Manson initially resisted responding to Love's criticism during his band's turn on stage. However, after the band performed their single "The Dope Show", Manson retorted by holding his own poll, asking how much of the audience were there to watch his band. After the majority of concertgoers erupted in a loud cheer he taunted, "I show pity for the older people on this tour ... the grandmothers" in reference to Love.

The next day, Manson issued a statement on his website that apologized for his band's inability to attend the post-show after-party due to "extreme problems being caused by Hole". He acknowledged the existence of "a war between us and Hole", and predicted that the latter would not be a part of the tour for much longer. Love also spoke to MTV and cited serious production issues as the cause of the rift. She confirmed that she and her band seriously considered leaving the tour but that both bands would meet over the weekend ahead of the March 14, 1999, performance at The Forum in Inglewood, California, to discuss their concerns and resolve their conflict.

Less than a day after Love announced the probability of her band leaving the tour, DJ Bill Abbate of Boston-based radio station WCBN FM read a press release issued by Cambridge, Massachusetts-based tour promoter Don Law Concert Promotions, stating that Hole had already withdrawn from the double bill. The release was sent to several alternative rock radio stations in the Boston area. Hole spokesperson Gayle Fine and Don Law public relations director Pamela Fallon challenged the announcement. Fine did not guarantee that Hole would be on the tour after March 14, 1999, but she assured ticket holders that the band would perform at the March 13, 1999, concert at The Pond and The Forum. News of Hole's possible departure put the future of the tour into question among industry experts. Industry trade publication Pollstar's editor-in-chief Gary Bongiovanni commented, "Historically, Manson has gotten arena-level press but not sold-out arenas."

=== Hole's departure ===
On March 14, 1999, Hole officially announced their withdrawal from the tour as they took the stage at The Forum arena. Love cited public ridicule as well as the inability of the two groups to resolve the financial issues related to Manson's expensive production among their reasons. Due to their 50/50 arrangement, Hole inadvertently subsidized a huge portion of the large cost of mounting Manson's shows which depleted their revenue. At their final performance, Love told the audience, "We're history after this. You'll get to see the crack of someone's ass (a reference to Manson's habit of dropping his pants onstage). It will be fun." During their performance later in the evening, Manson suffered a hairline fracture on one of his ankles while jumping between on-stage platforms. His injury caused the tour to be temporarily suspended.

== Aftermath ==
Following their departure, Hole had a series of shows in North America and the United Kingdom. They joined the British Glastonbury Festival in Pilton, Somerset, England on June 22, 1999, and were slated to perform two shows with the female-focused music festival Lilith Fair on August 10, 1999, at the Polaris Amphitheater in Columbus, Ohio, and August 11, 1999, at the Riverbend Music Center in Cincinnati, respectively, but later decided against it, with Courtney Love later saying the tour offered them "like five dollars" and commenting that her band would be "saving" Lilith Fair by bringing actual rock and roll to the otherwise softer-edged lineup dominated by mellow singer-songwriters. Marilyn Manson resumed the tour on March 21, 1999, renaming it the Rock Is Dead Tour after their single "Rock Is Dead", despite the fact that the name was already being used by American rock bands Korn and Rob Zombie for their own concurrent joint U.S. tour. Manson kept all of the remaining scheduled engagements intact.

Imperial Teen's billing was withdrawn in favor of Grammy-nominated American psychobilly band Nashville Pussy, who took over the opening act slot from Monster Magnet beginning from the April 2, 1999, concert at the Memorial Coliseum in Winston-Salem, North Carolina, until the completion of all North American dates on the tour. Manson explained to MTV that the initial inclusion of Imperial Teen on the tour was "by Courtney's request. I think we're probably better off, because that would've been an additional torment for our fans that they didn't need." He added that while he enjoyed their music on CD, he felt there was too much difference in their musical and performance approach for their continued inclusion on the tour to work. Imperial Teen instead were enlisted by Hole as opening band for their own North American tour dates.

Marilyn Manson released a live video album on November 2, 1999, titled God Is in the T.V., which contained unreleased footage including a behind-the-scenes backstage look at some of the experiences the band underwent during the Beautiful Monsters Tour. He claimed it clarified the real motive for Hole's departure. He added, "There's a really great speech [Love] gives about me and her insecurity and lack of fans at the concerts. Although it disparages her somewhat, I find it very amusing." He also released a live album on November 12, 1999, titled The Last Tour on Earth that documented curated performances by his band from various concerts during the tour.

=== Reconciliation ===
More than 15 years after the tour ended, Love and Manson settled their differences and reconciled. In December 2014, Love posted a picture on the social networking service Instagram of her, Manson and their mutual friend Billy Corgan (Note: Lead singer of American alternative rock band The Smashing Pumpkins. Corgan contributed largely to the songwriting process on Celebrity Skin and acted as a musical consultant on Mechanical Animals.) sitting together with a caption that read "all hatchets buried". In an interview with Esquire magazine on January 20, 2015, Manson elaborated on their reconciliation (Note: Extract from Marilyn Manson's Esquire magazine interview titled, Marilyn Manson on 'Inventing' Grunge, Sons of Anarchy, and Why He's a Furby: "We never really had a falling out. We've always been weird with each other, because she's slept with pretty much every one of my friends, supposedly. Not me, though. She, one time, told me she was mad at me because I didn't want to fuck her and I was smarter than her. I said, "Well, you kind of proved your own point right there on that one." But it was cool. We didn't work any scenes together (on American television series Sons of Anarchy), but I saw her on the red carpet. Her dress broke, and I said, "You okay? Your pussy didn't show, did it?" and she said, "No", and I went, "Thank God! That would've been horrible!" That was the only time I fucked with her. Other than that, I'm cool with Courtney.") which prompted a sarcastic response from Love on the social networking service Twitter. (Note: Love's Twitter response to Manson's Esquire interview: "Omg @marilynmanson all this time thought u're gay. Of course I'll fuck u. Im free Fri from 1:15 to 1:18 gives us plenty time 4 a smoke too x") In 2018, Love made a cameo appearance as a nurse in Manson's video for "Tattooed in Reverse".

== Lineup ==
=== Hole ===
- Vocals, guitar: Courtney Love
- Guitar: Eric Erlandson
- Bass, backing vocals: Melissa Auf der Maur
- Drums, percussions: Samantha Maloney

=== Marilyn Manson ===
- Vocals, guitar: Marilyn Manson
- Guitars: John 5
- Bass: Twiggy Ramirez
- Keyboards, percussions, programming: Madonna Wayne Gacy
- Drums: Ginger Fish

== Tour dates ==
List of completed tour dates with Hole
Date	City	Country	Venue	Opening Act(s)
28 February 1999	Spokane	United States	Spokane Arena	Monster Magnet
2 March 1999	Vancouver	Canada	PNE Coliseum	Monster Magnet
3 March 1999	Seattle	United States	KeyArena	Monster Magnet
6 March 1999	Portland	United States	Rose Garden Arena	Monster Magnet
7 March 1999	Nampa	United States	Idaho Center	Monster Magnet
10 March 1999	Daly City	United States	Cow Palace	Monster Magnet
11 March 1999	Sacramento	United States	ARCO Arena	Monster Magnet
13 March 1999	Anaheim	United States	The Pond	Monster Magnet
14 March 1999	Inglewood	United States	The Forum	Monster Magnet

List of planned tour dates for The Beautiful Monsters Tour
Date	City	Country	Venue	Opening act
16 March 1999	San Diego	United States	The Sports Arena	Monster Magnet
17 March 1999	Las Vegas	United States	Thomas & Mack Center	Monster Magnet
18 March 1999	Phoenix	United States	Arizona Veterans Memorial Coliseum	Monster Magnet
21 March 1999	Houston	United States	The Summit	Monster Magnet
22 March 1999	San Antonio	United States	Alamodome	Monster Magnet
23 March 1999	Dallas	United States	Reunion Arena	Monster Magnet
25 March 1999	New Orleans	United States	UNO Arena	Monster Magnet
27 March 1999	Tampa	United States	Ice Palace	Monster Magnet
29 March 1999	Orlando	United States	Orlando Arena	Monster Magnet
30 March 1999	Sunrise	United States	National Car Rental Center Arena	Monster Magnet
2 April 1999	Winston-Salem	United States	Winston-Salem Memorial Coliseum	Monster Magnet
3 April 1999	Fairfax	United States	Patriot Center	Monster Magnet
4 April 1999	Philadelphia	United States	First Union Spectrum	Monster Magnet
6 April 1999	East Rutherford	United States	Meadowlands Sports Complex	Imperial Teen
7 April 1999	Uniondale	United States	Nassau Veterans Memorial Coliseum	Imperial Teen
9 April 1999	Worcester	United States	The Centrum	Imperial Teen
10 April 1999	New Haven	United States	New Haven Coliseum	Imperial Teen
11 April 1999	Buffalo	United States	Marine Midland Arena	Imperial Teen
13 April 1999	Cleveland	United States	CSU Arena	Imperial Teen
15 April 1999	Auburn Hills	United States	The Palace of Auburn Hills	Imperial Teen
16 April 1999	Pittsburgh	United States	Pittsburgh Arena	Imperial Teen
17 April 1999	Fort Wayne	United States	Fort Wayne Coliseum	Imperial Teen
20 April 1999	Rosemont	United States	Rosemont Horizon	Imperial Teen
21 April 1999	Grand Rapids	United States	Van Andel Arena	Imperial Teen
22 April 1999	Indianapolis	United States	Market Square Arena	Imperial Teen
24 April 1999	Madison	United States	Dane County Coliseum	Imperial Teen
25 April 1999	Milwaukee	United States	Bradley Center	Imperial Teen
27 April 1999	Minneapolis	United States	Target Center	Imperial Teen
