= Mechanical Animals Tour =

1998–99 concert tour by Marilyn Manson

Mechanical Animals
- Tour by Marilyn Manson
- Promotional poster for the November 16 performance of the Mechanical Animals Tour
- Associated album: Mechanical Animals
- Start date: October 25, 1998
- End date: January 31, 1999
- No. of shows: 52 (planned); 46 (completed)

Marilyn Manson concert chronology
- Dead to the World (1996−1997); Mechanical Animals (1998−1999); Beautiful Monsters (1999)

Mechanical Animals was a worldwide tour by the band Marilyn Manson in support of their third LP record Mechanical Animals, released on September 15, 1998. The tour extended from late 1998 to early 1999 and was recorded in 1998 for the VHS-format God is in the TV which was released on November 2, 1999.

The Mechanical Animals European Festival Tour was supposed to be the first leg of the tour. This particular leg of the tour consisted of six dates to be played at various European festivals planned as the debut of follow-up material to Antichrist Superstar two months before the release of Mechanical Animals. This leg of the tour spanned from June 25, 1998, until July 12, 1999.

Reportedly, drummer Ginger Fish became ill with mononucleosis. This led the band to cancel the entire summer European leg and postpone the beginning of the tour to October 25, 1998.

Beginning on October 25, 1998, and lasting until January 31, 1999, the "Mechanical Animals Tour" included two legs spanning a Fall to Winter World Tour in Europe, Japan, and North America and a 6 show headlining stint at the Big Day Out Music Festival in Australia.

== Background ==
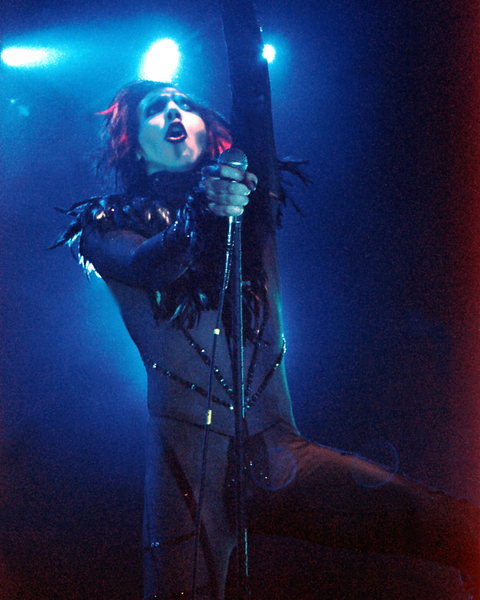
Marilyn Manson during the Mechanical Animals Tour

After declining a headlining slot at the failing Lollapalooza summer music festival (along with numerous other bands) in early 1998 due to delays in Mechanical Animals' release, the band launched the first of their own headlining tours in support of the album. The tour was originally intended to begin on June 25, 1998, with a series of 6 festival dates in Europe lasting until July 12, 1998. However, drummer Ginger Fish became ill with mononucleosis, leading to the cancellation of the entire summer European leg and the postponement of the beginning of the tour to October 25, 1998, in Lawrence, Kansas.

== Performance and show themes ==
With this being the first leg of the tour, the stage show was minimal compared to later legs of the tour

== Incidents ==
As with the band's preceding 1997 world tour, Dead to the World, the Mechanical Animals Tour met with heavy resistance from civic and religious leaders. The first of these protests occurred on October 19, 1998. A month before a planned performance at the Landmark Theatre in Syracuse, New York, local activists began calling for a cancellation of the engagement. According to Associated Press, then-Syracuse Mayor Roy Bernardi attempted to block the venue's permit, citing a "moral obligation to the people of Syracuse", without specifying any reason for his objections. Onondaga County officials also attempted to extort the Landmark into halting the event by threatening to withhold $30,000 in county funds earmarked for the venue, prompting the venue's bookers to consider dropping the show altogether. Despite this, representatives for the Landmark started selling tickets on the day it was planned and the performance took place on the arranged date and venue.

== Set list ==
=== North America ===
1. The Reflecting God
2. Great Big White World
3. Cake and Sodomy
4. Posthuman
5. Mechanical Animals
6. I Want to Disappear
7. Sweet Dreams (Are Made of This)
8. The Speed of Pain
9. Rock Is Dead
10. The Dope Show
11. Lunchbox
12. User Friendly
13. I Don't Like the Drugs (But the Drugs Like Me)
14. Rock N Roll Nigger
15. The Beautiful People
16. Irresponsible Hate Anthem

=== Europe/Asia ===
1. Inauguration of the Mechanical Christ
2. The Reflecting God
3. Great Big White World
4. Cake and Sodomy
5. Sweet Dreams (Are Made of This)
6. Astonishing Panorama of the Endtimes
7. Rock Is Dead
8. The Dope Show
9. Lunchbox
10. I Don't Like the Drugs (But the Drugs Like Me)
11. Rock N Roll Nigger
12. The Beautiful People

== Broadcasts and recordings ==
Various shows were recorded on the tour but there was no specific information about which dates. A 40-minute short film was released on VHS entitled God Is in the T.V. following the tour, however it only contained short live clips from various shows. Widely heralded as the band's best tour, their 2012 comeback sparked interest in the release of an uninterrupted live DVD of this tour. It is not known if the full recordings exist of the performances shown in God Is in the T.V.. The only full live recordings available are bootleg from their January 23, 1999 concert in Sydney, Australia during their headlining stint at the Big Day Out Music Festival. The video is of mediocre quality. A rare partial recording of the band's concert on November 16, 1998, in Detroit, Michigan, and unedited aftershow promotional interview also exist.

== Tour dates ==
List of concerts, showing date, city, country, and venue
Date	City	Country	Venue	Opening Act(s)	Attendance	Revenue
North America
October 25, 1998	Lawrence	United States	Granada	n/a	—	—
October 26, 1998	Kansas City	United States	Memorial Hall	n/a	3,095 / 3,095	$77,375
October 27, 1998	St. Louis	United States	Fox Theater	n/a	—	—
October 29, 1998	Milwaukee	United States	Riverside Theater	n/a	2,466 / 2,466	$57,502
October 30, 1998	Chicago	United States	Aragon Ballroom	n/a	4,500 / 4,500	$112,500
October 31, 1998	Saint Paul	United States	Roy Wilkins Auditorium	n/a	—	—
November 3, 1998	Tulsa	United States	Brady Theatre	n/a	2,599 / 2,969	$64,975
November 4, 1998	Houston	United States	Aerial Theatre	n/a	—	—
November 5, 1998	Dallas	United States	Bronco Bowl	n/a	3,213 / 3,213	$77,925
November 7, 1998	New Orleans	United States	State Theatre	n/a	—	—
November 9, 1998	Atlanta	United States	Tabernacle	n/a	2,500 / 2,500	$68,750
November 10, 1998	Charlotte	United States	Ovens Auditorium	n/a	2,565 / 2,565	$61,850
November 11, 1998	Richmond	United States	Landmark Theater	n/a	2,828 / 3,000	$69,993
November 13, 1998	Camden	United States	Sony Blockbuster Pavilion	n/a	6,757 / 6,757	$179,061
November 14, 1998	Cleveland	United States	Cleveland Music Hall	n/a	2,757 / 2,757	$75,818
November 16, 1998	Detroit	United States	State Theatre	n/a	—	—
November 18, 1998	Mississauga	Canada	Arrow Hall	n/a	4,647 / 4,647	$89,106
November 19, 1998	Syracuse	United States	Landmark Theatre	n/a	2,706 / 2,706	$67,650
November 21, 1998	Poughkeepsie	United States	Mid-Hudson Civic Center	n/a	—	—
November 22, 1998	Lowell	United States	Tsongas Arena	n/a	—	—
November 23, 1998	New York City	United States	Hammerstein Ballroom	n/a	3,600 / 3,600	$103,200
Europe
November 27, 1998	Barcelona	Spain	Pavello de la D'Hebron	n/a	—	—
November 28, 1998	Bilbao	Spain	Pabellon de la Castilla	n/a	—	—
November 30, 1998	Lisbon	Portugal	Pavilhão Atlântico	n/a	—	—
December 1, 1998	Madrid	Spain	Palacio de la Commidad	n/a	—	—
December 4, 1998	Milan	Italy	Palavobis	n/a	—	—
December 9, 1998	Copenhagen	Denmark	K.B. Hallen	n/a	—	—
December 10, 1998	Oslo	Norway	Rockefeller Music Hall	n/a	—	—
December 11, 1998	Stockholm	Sweden	Stockholm Arena	n/a	—	—
December 13, 1998	Hamburg	Germany	Grosse Freiheit 36	n/a	—	—
December 14, 1998	Tilburg	Netherlands	013	n/a	—	—
December 16, 1998	Cologne	Germany	E-Werk	n/a	—	—
December 17, 1998	London	England	Brixton Academy	n/a	—	—
December 18, 1998	Deinze	Belgium	Breilpoort	n/a	—	—
December 19, 1998	Paris	France	Zénith de Paris	n/a	—	—
North America
December 31, 1998	Las Vegas	United States	The Joint	n/a	—	—
Asia
January 8, 1999	Tokyo	Japan	NK Hall	n/a	—	—
January 9, 1999	Tokyo	Japan	NK Hall	n/a	—	—
January 11, 1999	Osaka	Japan	Zepp	n/a	—	—
January 12, 1999	Osaka	Japan	Zepp	n/a	—	—
Big Day Out
January 15, 1999	Auckland	New Zealand	Ericcson Stadium	n/a	—	—
January 17, 1999	Gold Coast	Australia	Gold Coast Parklands	n/a	—	—
January 23, 1999	Sydney	Australia	Sydney Showgrounds	n/a	—	—
January 26, 1999	Melbourne	Australia	Melbourne Showgrounds	n/a	—	—
January 29, 1999	Adelaide	Australia	Adelaide Showgrounds	n/a	—	—
January 31, 1999	Perth	Australia	Bassendean Oval	n/a	—	—

=== Cancelled or rescheduled shows ===
List of cancelled concerts, showing date, city, country, venue and reason for cancellation
Date	City	Country	Venue	Reason
Leg 1: European Festival Tour 1998
June 25, 1998	Roskilde	Denmark	Roskilde Festival	Ginger Fish contracted mononucleosis.
June 27, 1998	Burgh	Netherlands	Waldrock Festival	Ginger Fish contracted mononucleosis.
June 28, 1998	Dessel	Belgium	Graspop Metal Meeting	Ginger Fish contracted mononucleosis.
June 30, 1998	Kristiansand	Norway	Odderøya Amfi	Ginger Fish contracted mononucleosis.
July 9, 1998	Frauenfeld	Germany	Out in the Green Festival	Ginger Fish contracted mononucleosis.
July 12, 1998	Zwickau	Germany	Full Force Open Air	Ginger Fish contracted mononucleosis.

== Lineup ==
Marilyn Manson

- Marilyn Manson: Vocals
- John 5: Guitar
- Twiggy Ramirez: Bass
- Madonna Wayne Gacy: Keyboards
- Ginger Fish: Drums

== Reception ==
=== Critical reception ===
Music critic Tim Finn of The Kansas City Star commented that, overall, the show was "far less a spectacle than the Antichrist Superstar tour."
