= Lakita Garth =

American sexual abstinence activist

Lakita Garth is an American sexual abstinence activist, public speaker, and rapper. Born in Los Angeles, Garth was a beauty queen, winning the title of Miss Black California in 1994. In the 1990s, she was a frequent guest on Politically Incorrect with Bill Maher, as well as being interviewed by outlets including Vogue and MTV about her advocacy.

Garth has testified before the United States House of Representatives on abstinence and teenage pregnancy. She has also written a book, The Naked Truth, on the subject, and recorded an inspirational rap album, Lakita (1999).

== Biography ==
=== Early life ===
Garth was born in Los Angeles, the youngest of five children. Her father, a 27-year veteran of the United States Air Force, died of cancer when Garth was 11. Garth reflected that both her parents were strict, with her mother nicknamed "Warden". Garth's mother was a regular churchgoer, although Lakita refused to attend church as a child. In high school, Garth says she was teased for being abstinent. Garth was also a beauty queen, winning the title of Miss Black California in 1995 and winning second runner-up in the Miss Black America pageant that year.

=== Activism ===
On May 25, 1994, Garth testified before the United States House of Representatives' committee on teenage pregnancy. The following year, she was interviewed by Vogue in her capacity as spokesperson for Athletes for Abstinence. In February 1998, she was the keynote speaker at a California Republican Party summit on African American voter outreach. On July 16, 1998, she again testified before Congress, to the Small Business Subcommittee on Empowerment. In 2006, she spoke at Battle Cry For A Generation, a San Francisco Christian music festival. She has also discussed abstinence and domestic violence with the University of Southern California football team and the Chicago Tribune.

Garth wrote a book, The Naked Truth (Revell, 2011), on premarital sex and abstinence. In 1999, she also released a rap album titled Lakita. Her song "Speak to the Hand" was featured on the 1999 compilation Power Jams.

=== Media appearances ===
During the 1990s, Garth regularly appeared on the panel discussion show Politically Incorrect with Bill Maher, as well as on MTV's series Sex in the '90s. In an episode of Politically Incorrect (filmed on July 30 and aired on August 13, 1997), she debated rock musician Marilyn Manson, Nixon administration official G. Gordon Liddy, and actress Florence Henderson about issues including religion and Manson's music. In 2005, Garth appeared on The View and in People Magazine. She has also appeared in Seventeen and Cosmopolitan.

== Personal life ==
In 2005, after dating for two years, Garth married Jeffrey Wright. Garth remained abstinent until her marriage.

== Works cited ==
- DeFao, Janine (March 26, 2006). "Evangelical Christian concert draws 25,000 / Teens flock to hear rock 'n' roll that eschews sex, drugs". SFGate.
- "Ex-beauty queen tells group sexual abstinence is the best". Toledo Blade. May 8, 2002.
- Fleming, Anne Taylor (February 1995). "Like a Virgin, Again". Vogue: 68–72.
- Garth, Lakita (January 22, 2013). "Is Abstinence Unrealistic?". Charisma.
- Jenkins, Tina (April 4, 1999). "A Message of Abstinence for Teens". Chicago Tribune.
- Klein, Gary (August 9, 2005). "Players Are Cautioned About Risky Behavior". LA Times. Archived from the original on December 18, 2022.
- Marinucci, Carla (February 21, 1998). "Political Notebook: GOP Summit Grapples With Problem of Wooing African Americans / Party is 6% black — churchgoers may be targeted". SFGate.
- "700 Club: Lakita Garth: Sexual Purity in the Real World". CBN. Christian Broadcasting Network. March 26, 2008.
- Toussaint, Pamela Taylor (March 2006). "The 36-Year-Old Virgin". Christianity Today.
