= Antichrist Superstar (song) =

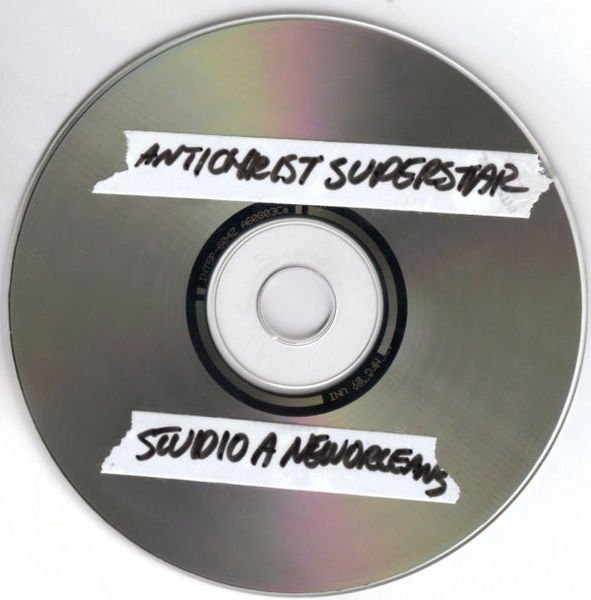

Promotional single by Marilyn Manson

from the album Antichrist Superstar
- Released: 1996
- Genre: Industrial metal
- Length: 5:14
- Label: Nothing
- Songwriters: Manson; Ramirez; Gacy
- Producers: Trent Reznor; Dave Ogilvie; Marilyn Manson; Sean Beavan

Audio sample
- file; help

"Antichrist Superstar" is a song by American rock band Marilyn Manson. It was released as the first promotional single from their second studio album of the same name. The song itself is symbolic of the climax of the concept album's story, the point where the abused and wretched victim at the center of the tale takes on the identity of the nihilistic culture war iconoclast Antichrist Superstar, rampaging the world and destroying anything in his path. This image is conveyed by the song's triumphal and ominous tone; the guitar riffs are deliberately reminiscent of horns and trumpets in a totalitarian rally, in which Manson sings, and could be an allusion to how his critics see him as a threat to Christian morality and, therefore, the world.

In concert, Marilyn Manson usually sings the song atop a podium in a stage filled with banners embellished with the album's distinctive "lightning bolt/shock" symbol, much like the Nazi Nuremberg Rallies and sings the song with highly exaggerated body movements and postures meant to mock and parody dictators and televangelists.

Rover's Morning Glory uses this song's intro as the show's intro song and anthem.

== Song overview ==
I'm satirising the fascism of politics, of religion, and most importantly the fascism of rock'n'roll. Whether people are realising that, or simply buzzing off the spectacle, isn't my concern. I'm thoroughly entertained by it as a massive piece of performance art because it has so many dimensions, because we're the polar opposite of Nazism, would be the first to be destroyed by it, and we're using that imagery against itself ... Words and symbolism are only as powerful as you make them. Just looking at fascist imagery doesn't make it hateful ... All there is, is making people think for themselves. That's it. No answers. You make your choice. Fascism is precisely what I'm out to destroy but if people see our show and see fascism, it's in them already. It's a self discovery and that's what we're here for, to make people think, enable self-discovery. I ain't here to condemn or condone. I'm here to go against the grain. I've transformed my world so that I am my own work of fiction, with no boundaries to what I can do, no limits. I'm saying anyone can do that. Anyone.

— Marilyn Manson

== Music video ==
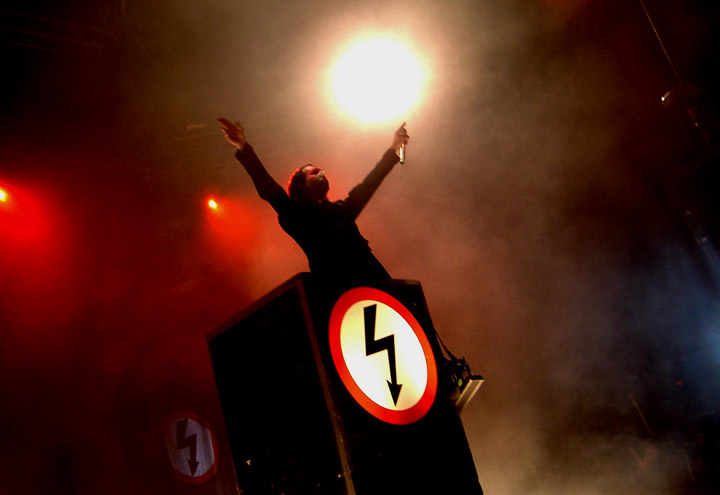
Marilyn Manson performing "Antichrist Superstar"

The music video for the song, directed by E. Elias Merhige and co-directed by Manson, was filmed sometime during 1996, but remains officially unreleased. It was originally screened at the 1997 San Francisco Film Festival as part of a program titled "Newly Minted Memories". It won a Golden Gate Certificate of Merit in the "Music Video" category.

In 1996, Merhige was contacted by Manson to produce a music video for "Cryptorchid" the day after he saw Merhige's 1989 experimental horror film Begotten. Manson and Merhige met in Los Angeles, California, where they produced the video. Merhige then expressed interest in filming a video for "Antichrist Superstar", but wanted to use a bulk of footage outtake that he had already compiled. He shot excess material featuring Manson, then edited it together with the pre-existing scenes.

Merhige used military footage from different countries and different wars that depicted the fascist aspect of the song. However, Manson was not quite sure that it represented the criticism that the subject matter deserved. Ultimately, release of the video was vetoed by Interscope, who was appalled by the quality of the cinematography. The frontman, for his part, expressed interest in seeing its release someday, quipping: "that's not to say it won't be seen but I'm not sure if [Merhige] ever had a fair chance of finishing it because of the record company."

"Antichrist Superstar"
Live version recorded in Imola, Italy, as it appeared on The Last Tour on Earth

For over 14 years the film was shelved by Interscope. Despite this, on June 19, 2010, the music video was released in its entirety on YouTube. The leaked video is 5 minutes and 43 seconds in length although, according to the title card, its total run time is 5 minutes and 23 seconds. It was filmed by Merhige in black and white, incorporating footage from Begotten as well as the military warfare footage. Original scenes including Manson were also filmed where he is seen playing a demagogue in a business suit tearing pages out of a bible from the top of a podium similar to his live performance of the song. Henry S. Rosenthal of San Francisco-based film company Complex Corporation mentioned his involvement in the production of the video and he is credited in the film's intertitle. In mid-2011 the music video was put up for streaming on the band's official website.
