= Coma White =

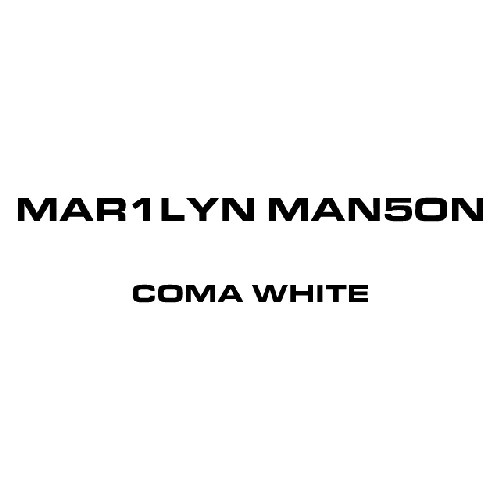

Promotional single by Marilyn Manson

from the album Mechanical Animals
- Released: September 20, 1999
- Genre: Hard rock
- Length: 5:38
- Label: Interscope
- Songwriter(s): Marilyn Manson; Twiggy Ramirez; Madonna Wayne Gacy; Zim Zum
- Producer(s): Michael Beinhorn; Marilyn Manson

"Coma White" is a song by American rock band Marilyn Manson and the last track on the album Mechanical Animals. It is a hard rock ballad written by Manson, Twiggy Ramirez, Madonna Wayne Gacy, Zim Zum and produced by Manson and Michael Beinhorn. It was inspired by Manson's relationship with Rose McGowan and the numbness that his drug use caused him to feel. The track features a snare drum, cymbals, guitar, piano and keyboard bass in its instrumentation. Critics offered varied interpretations of its meaning, ranging from a song about a drug-addicted woman to a critique of celebrity culture. The song garnered a mostly positive response from music critics, with some critics deeming it one of the greatest songs of the band's career.

The song's music video was directed by Samuel Bayer. It recreates the assassination of John F. Kennedy with Manson as President Kennedy, McGowan as Jacqueline Kennedy, and the other members of the band as Secret Service agents; it also features Manson on a cross. Manson explained that it was intended as a tribute to men like Kennedy and Jesus who "died at the hands of mankind's unquenchable thirst for violence." It garnered significant controversy, and its premiere on MTV was delayed due to both the Columbine High School massacre and the death of John F. Kennedy Jr. Critical response to the clip was mixed; some critics found it touching while others felt it was unsuited to the song.

== Background ==
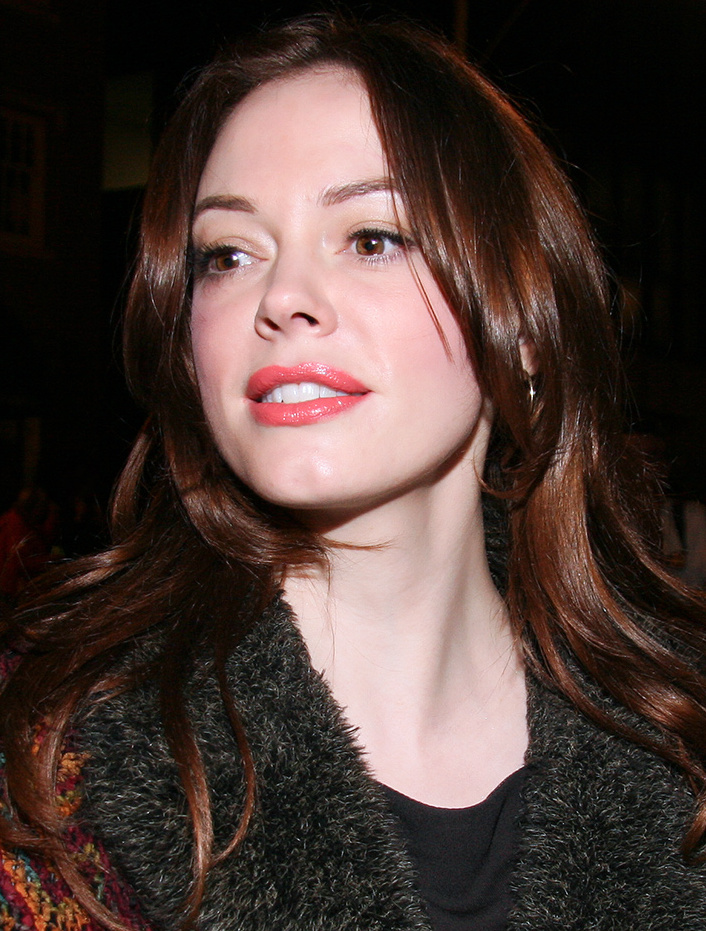
Rose McGowan inspired the track.

After the release of Antichrist Superstar (1996), an album which sparked controversy among Christian fundamentalists, Marilyn Manson didn't want to resume playing the role of a bogeyman. He feared that this would cause him to be "consigned to the one-note rock theatricality" of Kiss and Alice Cooper. He desired to convince casual rock and pop fans who had previously dismissed him that he was "more than a cartoon". For his next album, Mechanical Animals (1998), he took inspiration from the glam rock music that David Bowie made in the 1970s, and adopted a wardrobe and hairstyle similar to Bowie's.

Discussing Mechanical Animals with Lorraine Ali, Manson said: "There is a bit of a love story that exists on this record. The name I gave to the thing I was in love with was Coma White. It starts as the name of a girl I'm in love with, then ends up to really be a drug I've been taking. So I'm not really sure what I'm in love with." In 1999, Manson said that the song "Coma White" was inspired by his relationship with Rose McGowan, elaborating: "A lot of the pain she's gone through, I started to feel, and the record kind of documents me coming to terms with emotions and caring about somebody for the first time. And I guess I still express the fear of doing that as well."

Manson was asked about the use of the word "white" in the song's title in a 2017 interview with Consequence of Sound. He replied: "A lot of people thought that it was a race thing, and it was more of the idea that white is the composition of all colors." Manson has also said that "The color white comes up a lot. It kind of represents to me the numbness that I had. The numbness is manifested in drugs...in all the people who want to suck the life out of you when you become a rock star."

== Composition and lyrical interpretation ==
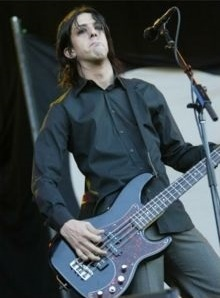
Twiggy Ramirez played guitar on "Coma White".

"Coma White" is a hard rock ballad that features elements of heavy metal music. It was written by Madonna Wayne Gacy, Marilyn Manson, Twiggy Ramirez and Zim Zum, and produced by Manson and Michael Beinhorn. Its instrumentation features a snare drum, cymbals, guitar, piano, mellotron and keyboard bass. It serves as the final song on Mechanical Animals. Chad Childers of Noisecreep described the song as one of the album's "more stripped back efforts". Manson does not scream in "Coma White" and other songs from Mechanical Animals as he did in some of his earlier work. Rather, according to Entertainment Weekly's David Browne, he apes the vocal stylings of Marc Bolan and David Bowie.

"Coma White"
A 30-second sample of "Coma White"

Ramirez plays the song's guitar solos. Stereogum's Joseph Schafer found the lead guitar riff of "Coma White" "cruel, frigid, and glitchy" and similar to Adrian Belew's work for Trent Reznor. Schafer felt that the drums in the song sound like the collaborations between Robert John "Mutt" Lange and Def Leppard on the album Hysteria (1987). He also wrote that the tracks' "snare and cymbals seem a bit damp, ringing and warbling just intermittently enough to suggest the laws of audio physics fraying at the edges." The song has the chorus "A pill to make you numb/ A pill to make you dumb/ A pill to make you anybody else/ But all the drugs in this world/ won't save her from herself." Manson puts pauses before the words "numb" and "dumb" in the chorus which are reminiscent of Pinter pauses. The track has a "sibling" song from Holy Wood (In the Shadow of the Valley of Death) (2000) entitled "Coma Black", which is also a ballad.

Critics offered different interpretations of the song's meaning. The Globe and Mail's Robert Everett-Green called it a "song about a druggy doomed woman". According to Ann Powers of Rolling Stone, the song, like several tracks on Mechanical Animals, focuses on a person's final moments before death and suggests themes of betrayal. Bob Waliszewski of PluggedIn deemed "Coma White" anti-drug and contrasted it with other songs on the album like "I Don't Like the Drugs (But the Drugs Like Me)" and "The Dope Show" which he felt glamorized drug use. Schafer wrote that "Coma White" displays "all of Manson's favorite themes — the seductive evil of prescription medication, lost love, [and] the paralyzing effect of celebrity culture". Craig Hlavaty wrote in the Houston Press that the song is about the assassination of John F. Kennedy.

== Critical reception ==
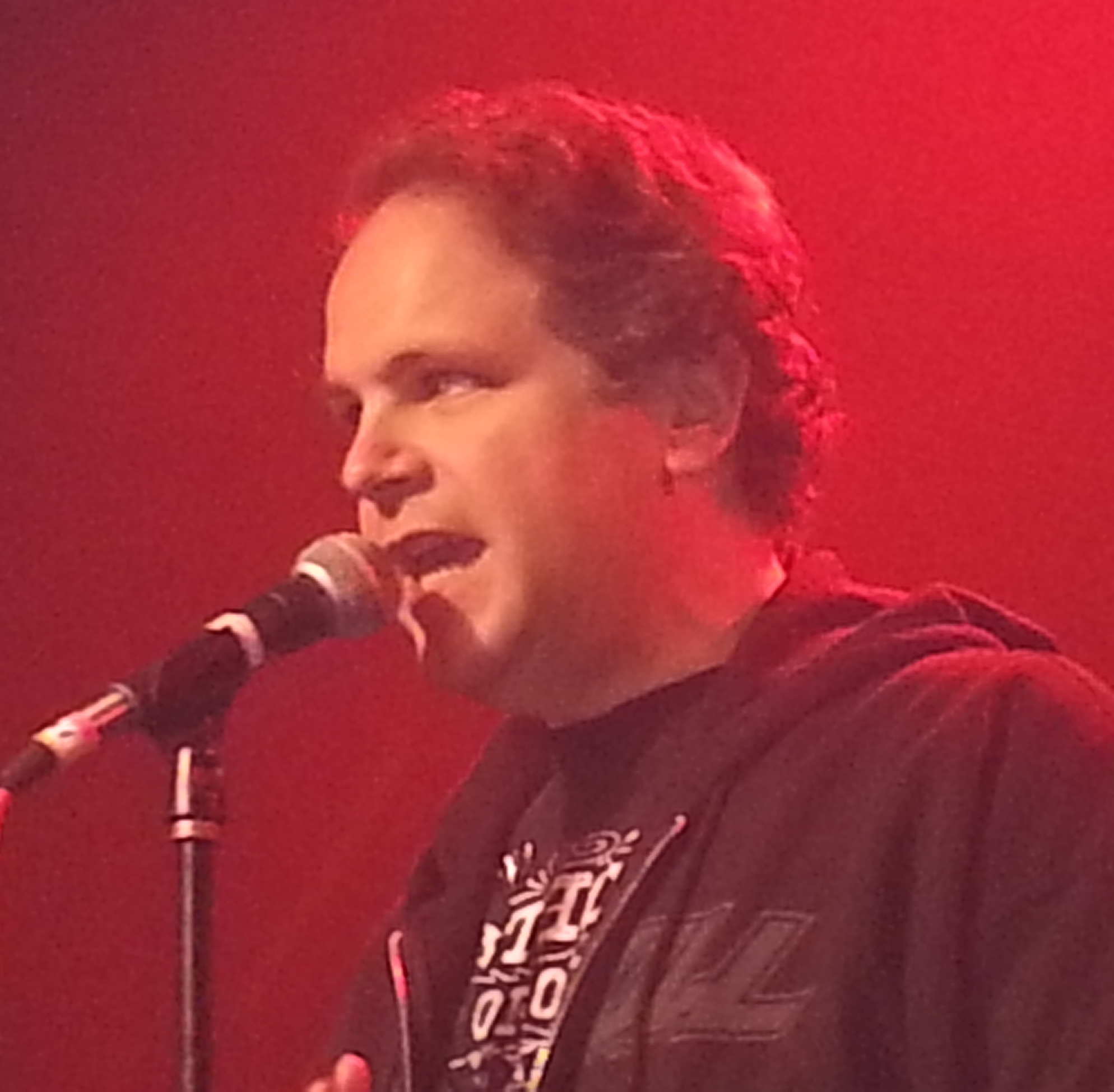
Eddie Trunk praised "Coma White".

Joseph Schafer of Stereogum ranked "Coma White" the best Marilyn Manson song, writing "Manson always walks the line between entertainer and artist; the best musicians and pop stars are both, but it's a difficult balance to strike, and Manson often fell more on the entertainer side. The difference between the two, however, is a matter of fine tuning, and on 'Coma White,' he nailed it." Loudwire's Graham Hartman deemed "Coma White" the second-best Marilyn Manson song, behind only "The Beautiful People" (1996). He said that "There are few songs that dedicated Mansonites hold closer to their warm bodies than 'Coma White.'" Eddie Trunk wrote in his book Eddie Trunk's Essential Hard Rock and Heavy Metal, Volume 2 that "Coma White" and another Mechanical Animals track, "Rock Is Dead", are some of his favorite songs in the band's catalog.

Alec Chillingworth of Metal Hammer opined that "'The Last Day On Earth' and 'Coma White' as a couplet could arguably be the band's most emotional output to date." Chillingworth added that "Coma White" displays a "calibre of musicianship" comparable to David Bowie's. Merritt Martin of the Dallas Observer praised the song and found it superior to the band's album The Golden Age of Grotesque (2003). Rolling Stone's Ann Powers wrote that "Coma White" "suggest[s] a banishment from the garden, a betrayal so fundamental that it can barely be remembered. The chemical abuse, the coldly functional sex and the bitter cynicism Manson describes elsewhere are all motivated by this loss." Writing for Loudwire, Chad Childers deemed "Coma White" a "standout track" and a "favorite". Neil Z. Yeung of AllMusic called the track a "peak-era favorite".

diffuser.fm's Tim Karan said that the song is "easily among the most beautiful entries in Manson's catalog" while Clint Hale of the Houston Press called it "arguably the best track Manson ever recorded". Hale elaborated: "'Coma White' is not an exception, but rather, the rule. Manson may not record a ton of balladry, but what little balladry he does record ranks among his finest musical output." Brad Miska wrote for Bloody Disgusting that "There's nothing in [Marilyn Manson's] entire collective career that compares to songs such as 'Great Big White World', 'The Last Day on Earth' and 'Coma White', all of which are available as alternate acoustic takes that are even more impressive than what's on the album." Joshua Klein of The A.V. Club wrote in a review of Mechanical Animals that "What [the album] lacks, sadly, is any sense of wit, as songs like 'Great Big White World,' 'The Dope Show,' and 'Coma White' doggedly hammer at safe taboos like drugs, sex, drugs, stardom, drugs, and death. And drugs." Entertainment Weekly's David Browne panned the title of the song for attempting to be shocking.

== Music video ==
The video recreates this moment from the Zapruder film.

The music video for "Coma White" was directed by Samuel Bayer and shot on February 20 and 21, 1999, in Los Angeles. It was inspired by a film script that Manson had written entitled Holywood. Manson said that the unproduced script featured "the idea that there were two previous Christs. There was Jesus and there was JFK, and the whole idea on Holy Wood was that they're waiting for the third and final savior, and that's what the president says he's going to be. President White." Via MarilynManson.com, Manson told his fans that the video was "the most beautiful and disturbing video we have ever done."

The video recreates the assassination of President John F. Kennedy in a nighttime setting and features Manson as the president, Rose McGowan as First Lady Jacqueline Kennedy, and the other members of the band as Secret Service agents in the convertible with the Kennedys. Manson wears a suit while McGowan wears a pillbox hat and a pink Chanel-style suit. Twiggy Ramirez wears striped tights in the video. Manson appears to be struck in the neck with a bullet. Afterward, McGowan cradles his head and weeps. The video recreates Jacqueline Kennedy scrambling on the trunk of a car, a moment from the Zapruder film. At one point, Manson climbs onto a cross and is paraded through the streets. No blood is shown in the recreation of the assassination; a representative for Bayer said that "We didn't feel like it was appropriate to actually act out the assassination." The video also features an appearance by actor Matthew McGrory, a man on stilts, transvestites wearing G-strings, heavily tattooed individuals, and women wearing revealing clothing.

=== Controversy ===
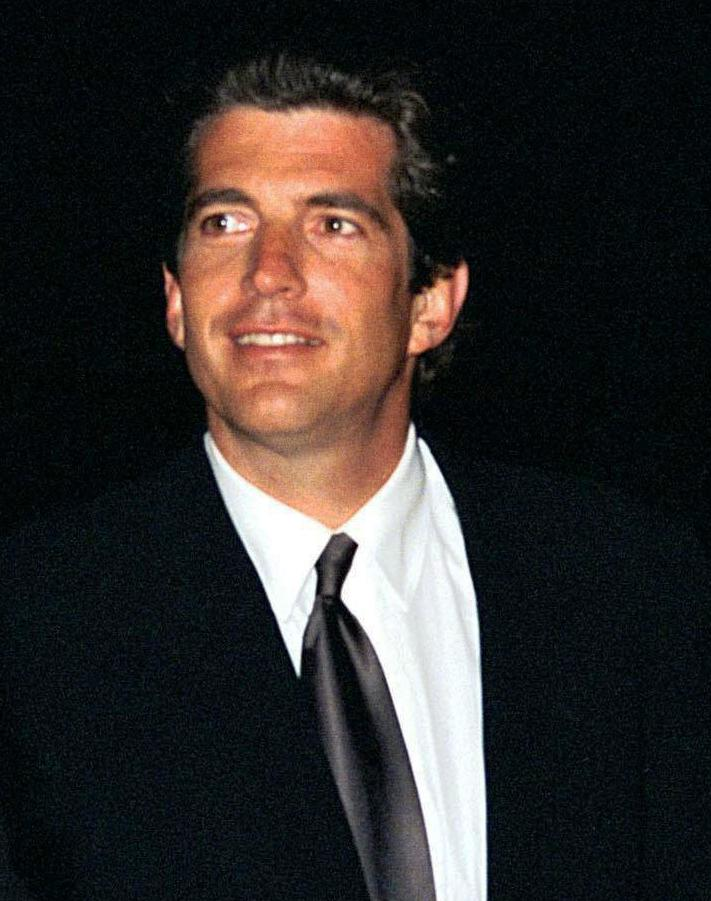
The clip's MTV premiere was delayed due to John F. Kennedy Jr.'s death

The "Coma White" music video garnered considerable controversy. The MTV premiere of the video was delayed in the spring of 1999 due to the Columbine High School massacre, which the band was falsely accused of inspiring. The premiere was delayed again in the summer of that year due to the death of John F. Kennedy Jr. Manson issued a statement about the video through his publicist which MTV's Rob Mancini said was an "attempt to nip any potential controversy in the bud." In the statement, Manson said that the clip "enact[s] the 'Journey of Death.' [It] was always intended to make people think of how they view and sometimes participate in these events. Little did I know that the tragedy at Columbine and the accidental death of JFK Jr. would follow. But it was telling to see the media shamelessly gorge itself on these events, which ultimately made my observations in the video even truer than I had originally imagined." He added that the video was "in no way mockery" and "a tribute to men like Jesus Christ and JFK who have died at the hands of mankind's unquenchable thirst for violence."

MTV's senior vice president of programming and talent Tom Calderone said that he was comfortable airing the video alongside Manson's statement, and the video premiered on the network on September 13, 1999, after Total Request Live's Carson Daly read the statement on air. It became one of the network's most requested videos. NBC News' Ree Hines and Anna Chan compared the controversy engendered by the clip to the controversy surrounding "Reverence" (1992) by The Jesus and Mary Chain, which featured the lyrics "I wanna die just like JFK / I wanna die on a sunny day / I wanna die just like JFK/ I wanna die in the USA"; "Reverence" became a top-ten hit in Britain despite being banned by a British television show. According to I Love Rock 'n' Roll (Except When I Hate It): Extremely Important Stuff About the Songs and Bands You Love, Hate, Love to Hate, and Hate to Love by Brian Boone, by the time that the "Coma White" video was shown on MTV, "Mechanical Animals was no longer a top album that needed promotion."

=== Critical reception and analysis ===
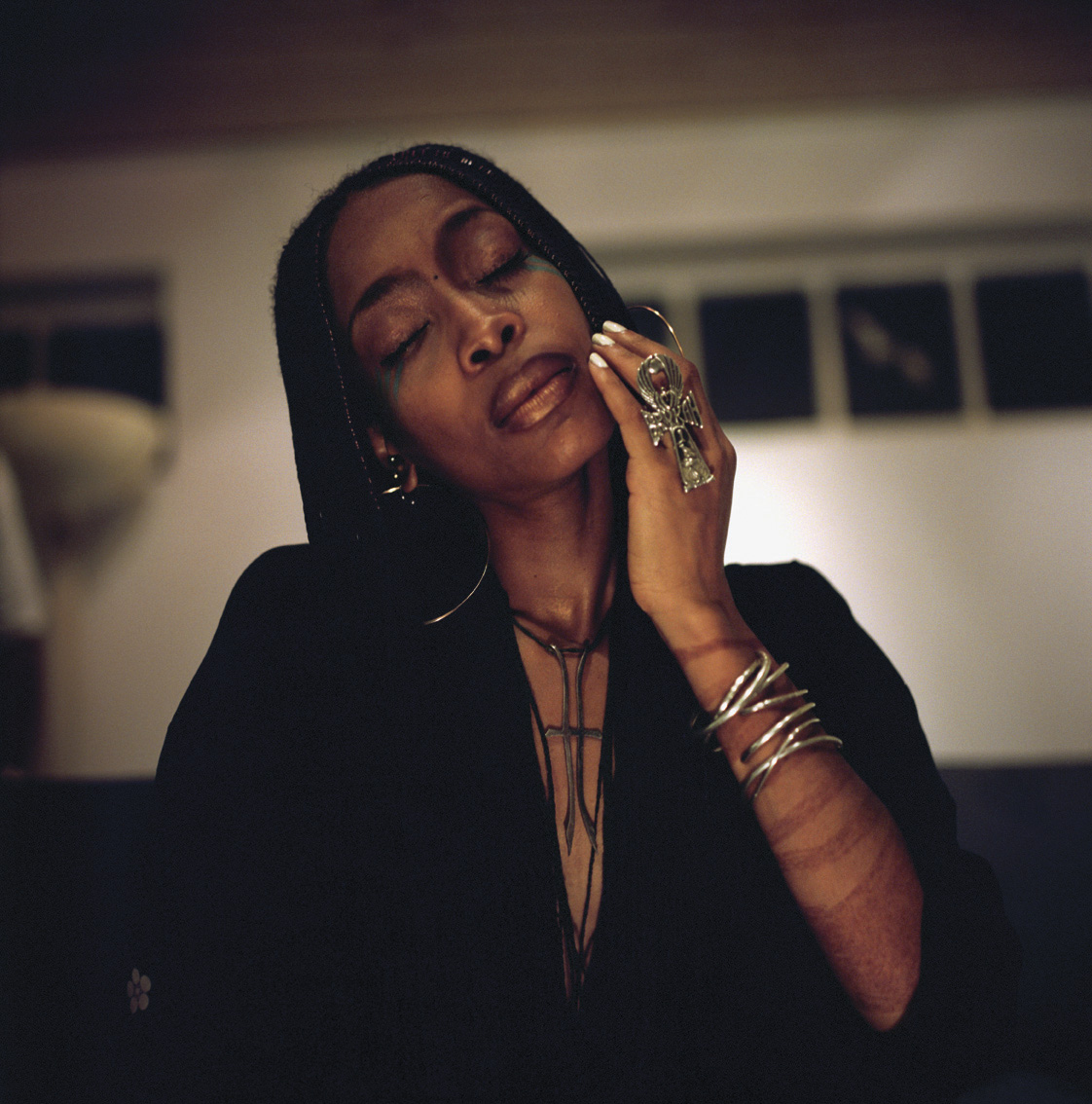
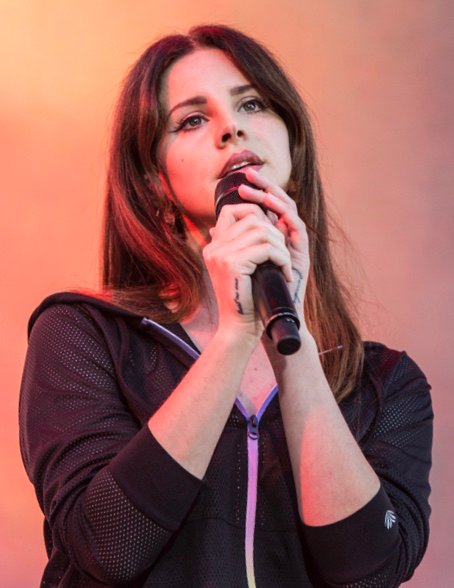
The video for "Coma White" was compared to subsequent videos by Erykah Badu (left) and Lana Del Rey (right).

Matthew Jacobs of HuffPost, in an article analyzing various cultural portrayals of Kennedy, deemed the video "tame" and "a touching tribute to a fallen legend". Jonathan Barkan of Bloody Disgusting called the clip "a wonderful video that actually follows through with telling a full story. The addition of Rose McGowan (Scream) and Matthew McGrory (House of 1000 Corpses) is a very cool treat for horror fans". The Dallas Observer's Laura Mann ranked the "Coma White" clip fifth on her list of "The Ten Best Videos Banned By MTV". She praised Twiggy Ramirez's fashion in the video. Alona Wartofsky of The Washington Post said that the video was released "at a time when music videos seem to be looking beyond thrusting pelvises and jiggling booties for ways to be provocative," noting the violence in the video for Limp Bizkit's "Re-Arranged" (1999), which was released around the same time as the clip for "Coma White".

TeamRock called the video "arty" and said that it stood alongside Nine Inch Nails's video for "Happiness in Slavery" (1992) as one of the most controversial videos in the history of heavy metal music. TeamRock also said that the video was "essentially the twilight of [Manson's] career as America's favourite boogeyman; the world was getting scary enough without him at that point." Brian Boone wrote in his book I Love Rock 'n' Roll (Except When I Hate It): Extremely Important Stuff About the Songs and Bands You Love, Hate, Love to Hate, and Hate to Love that the video is "tasteless". Robert Everett-Green of The Globe and Mail said "Lord knows why Manson yoked his song about a druggy doomed woman to a video that resets the assassination". Everett-Green noted that the Kennedy assassination had previously been turned into a "prop" in Ministry's video for "Reload" (1996) and would be similarly reframed in the videos for Erykah Badu's "Window Seat" (2010) and Lana Del Rey's "National Anthem" (2012).

== Track listings ==
- US promotional CD single
1. "Coma White" (Radio Edit) – 4:21
- EU promotional CD single
1. "Coma White" – 5:38
2. "Coma White" (Acoustic Version) – 5:33
- German promotional CD single
1. "Coma White" – 5:38
2. "Astonishing Panorama of the Endtimes" – 3:58

== Personnel ==
Credits adapted from the liner notes of Mechanical Animals.

- Marilyn Manson – lyrics, vocals, piano
- Twiggy Ramirez – lead and rhythm guitars and bass
- Madonna Wayne Gacy – keyboards and mellotron
- Zim Zum – acoustic and lead guitar

== See also ==
- Assassination of John F. Kennedy in popular culture
- List of songs recorded by Marilyn Manson
