= Rock Is Dead (Marilyn Manson song) =

1999 song

Single by Marilyn Manson

from the album: Mechanical Animals and The Matrix: Music from the Motion Picture
- Released: June 14, 1999
- Genre: Glam rock; industrial metal
- Length: 3:09
- Label: Maverick
- Songwriters: Marilyn Manson; Twiggy Ramirez; Madonna Wayne Gacy
- Producers: Manson; Michael Beinhorn; Sean Beavan

Marilyn Manson singles chronology
"I Don't Like the Drugs (But the Drugs Like Me)" (1999)	"Rock Is Dead" (1999)	"Disposable Teens" (2000)

"Rock Is Dead" is a song by American rock band Marilyn Manson. It was released as the third single from their third studio album, Mechanical Animals (1998). It was written by the band's eponymous frontman, along with bassist Twiggy Ramirez and keyboardist Madonna Wayne Gacy, and was produced by Manson, Michael Beinhorn and Sean Beavan. A glam rock and industrial metal track with elements of electronic music and grunge, the song features electric and bass guitars, keyboards, and live drums in its instrumentation. The song was featured on the soundtrack of the Wachowskis' film The Matrix (1999).

In the song, Manson proclaims the death of rock music and asserts that "God is in the TV." The lyrics of "Rock Is Dead" inspired varying interpretations; some critics felt that Manson was correct in asserting that rock is dead while others felt he was toying with his listeners. The track garnered a mostly positive response from music critics, who found it infectious and praised its lyrics. A music video for "Rock Is Dead" was directed by Manson and Samuel Bayer and features the band performing the song in costume. A second version of the video features clips from The Matrix.

== Background ==
After the release of Antichrist Superstar (1996), an album which sparked controversy among Christian fundamentalists, Marilyn Manson didn't want to resume playing the role of a bogeyman. He feared that this would cause him to be "consigned to the one-note rock theatricality" of Kiss and Alice Cooper. He desired to convince casual rock and pop fans who had previously dismissed him that he was "more than a cartoon." For his next album, Mechanical Animals (1998), he took inspiration from the glam rock music that David Bowie made in the 1970s, and adopted a wardrobe and hairstyle similar to Bowie's.

Discussing Mechanical Animals with Lorraine Ali, Manson said that he was "bored" with the aggression he displayed in the music of Antichrist Superstar, elaborating: "Everything you hear nowadays is an offshoot of NIN, Marilyn Manson, [or] Ministry. There's just no great rock albums anymore. There's a lot of rock music out there, but it's very bland and disposable. A lot of people may say this record is over the top, pretentious and theatrical, but that's what rock music is supposed to be about." Manson said in another interview that he believes that "Rock's not dead, it just needs a kick up the ass."

Following the release of Mechanical Animals, Jason Bentley, a DJ and spokesman for Madonna's Maverick Records, asked the band if they would allow for the song to be included on the soundtrack of the Wachowskis' film The Matrix (1999). Prior to signing on for "Rock Is Dead" to be used on the soundtrack, the band was invited to see a rough cut of the film. Other artists whose music was included on the soundtrack were Rob Zombie, Rage Against the Machine, Rammstein, The Prodigy, Deftones, and Ministry. The track appeared during the closing credits of the film. Noisecreep's Chad Childers wrote that the track's inclusion on the soundtrack gave it an "extra boost." The song's title inspired the name of the band's ill-fated five month 1999 worldwide arena tour, Rock Is Dead Tour.

== Composition ==
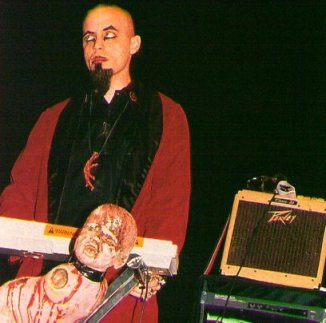
Madonna Wayne Gacy co-wrote "Rock Is Dead".

"Rock Is Dead"
An 18-second sample of "Rock Is Dead", a glam rock and heavy metal song that features elements of electronic music and grunge.

"Rock Is Dead" is a glam rock and industrial metal song with a length of three minutes and nine seconds; it features elements of electronic music and grunge. The track was written by the band's eponymous frontman, Twiggy Ramirez, and Madonna Wayne Gacy, and was produced by Manson, Sean Beavan and Michael Beinhorn. Its instrumentation consists of electric and bass guitars, keyboards, and live drums.

In the song, Manson sings "Rock! Is deader than dead!"; this assertion prompted various interpretations from critics. Writing for the Phoenix New Times, Jim Louvau said that Manson "was on to something in 1998's Mechanical Animals when he wrote 'Rock is Dead,' because the genre is in serious need of a make-over." Critics from Vibe said that the notion that "rock is dead" is a cliché, but argued that the track was mocking that notion, adding that "maybe rock is dead if people like Marilyn keep recreating old styles [like glam rock] instead of doing something new and innovative." Reviewing the song, James Oldham of NME said that the success of Marilyn Manson and similar artists proves that rock is not dead, but had merely embraced aspects of electronic music. He also felt that the track's lyrics about rock being dead are an example of Manson toying with his listeners. The song also includes the lyric "God is in the TV." Evan Moore of MTV notes this one of the few references to God on Mechanical Animals, an album which followed the religious-themed Antichrist Superstar.

PopMatters' Lance Teegarden felt that the song's "layered buzzsaw guitar riffs" and Manson's shout-like vocal performance on the chorus made "Rock Is Dead" sound like the band's previous single "Long Hard Road Out of Hell" (1997). On the track, Manson sings "whap, whap, whap, whap"; MTV's Evan Moore noted that Manson sang the same phrase on the band's cover of "Golden Years" (1975) by David Bowie, which was included on the Dead Man on Campus soundtrack. NME deemed the track "a fierce fist-in-the-air polemic that suggests Sigue Sigue Sputnik butchering T Rex." The publication also compared the track to the music of Garbage, The Smashing Pumpkins, and Bowie's The Rise and Fall of Ziggy Stardust and the Spiders from Mars (1972).

== Critical reception ==
Annalee Newitz of Salon said that the Mechanical Animals tracks "Rock Is Dead" and "Posthuman" are "Manson at his ironic, spiteful peak." Eddie Trunk wrote in his book Eddie Trunk's Essential Hard Rock and Heavy Metal, Volume 2 that "Rock Is Dead" and another Mechanical Animals track, "Coma White", are some of his favorite songs in the band's catalog. Chad Childers of Loudwire called "Rock Is Dead" a "thrusting rock song." In Exclaim!, Liisa Ladouceur commented "Seems like if you're going to write angry industrial anthems, screaming 'Rock is Dead!' is far more palatable to the masses than 'I am the God of Fuck.' Go figure!" Sputnikmusic's Simon K. described 'Rock Is Dead" and "I Don't Like the Drugs (But the Drugs Like Me)" as album highlights that "you’ll find yourself humming...for days." Writing for the Houston Press, Kristy Loye deemed "Rock Is Dead" one of Manson's greatest hit songs.

Alec Chillingworth of Metal Hammer described "Rock Is Dead" as one of the band's "certified classics, branded onto industrial metal's beating heart by one Mr Brian Warner." MTV's Evan Moore praised the song, saying "It's catchy, fast, loud, heavy and crazy. What's most addictive about the song is not the words, however, but Manson's yelling-style singing." Lorraine Ali of the Los Angeles Times said that in Mechanical Animals, "compelling melod[ies], foot-stomping rhythms, sing-along choruses and more relatable lyrics in such songs as 'New Model No. 15' and 'Rock Is Dead' are as infectious as the Sweet's 'Blockbuster' or Alice Cooper's 'School's Out.' For Spectrum Culture, Steve Lampiris praised the track for being "more subversive" than the music of Antichrist Superstar (1996) due to its "technicolor candy coating."

AllMusic's Becky Byrkit commended Manson's "super-scale performance" on the track. Matt Zakosek of The Chicago Maroon wrote "sometime in the midst of all that devilish preening and posturing, [Manson] found the time to make some pretty good music. I'm speaking specifically of songs like 'Rock is Dead' and 'The Fight Song,' each of which contain lyrics a lot more insightful than 'I'm a black rainbow,' thank God (or, in this case, thank Satan)." Teegarden of PopMatters said that the track "adhere[s] to standard-issue, industrial shock-rock formulas" and fails to distinguish itself from other Marilyn Manson songs. Drowned in Sound's Dale Price criticized the song for sounding "a little too much like a more upbeat Beautiful People."

== Music video ==
The music video for the song consists of footage of the band performing onstage in costume, and was directed by Manson alongside American director Samuel Bayer. It features the vocalist in costume as his alter ego Omēga. Another version of the video contains the same performance footage coupled together with clips from The Matrix. The latter music video appeared as a bonus feature on both of the box set HD DVD releases The Complete Matrix Trilogy and The Ultimate Matrix Collection. Jonathan Barkan of Bloody Disgusting found the "rather plain" clip reminiscent of "pop metal videos of the 80's, where a band would be playing on the stage but there wasn't any audience. Same thing here, except it's a big more polished, a bit more vibrant, and definitely more exciting. If this was meant to give a taste for what fans could expect in concert, it definitely set the right mood!"

== Formats and track listings ==
CD1 (Maverick: W486CD)
No.	Title	Length
1.	"Rock Is Dead"	3:11
2.	"Man That You Fear" (Acoustic Requiem for Antichrist Superstar)	5:21
3.	"Television" (Radio Edit) (Performed by Baxter)	3:09

CD2 (Maverick: W486CDX)
No.	Title	Length
1.	"Rock Is Dead"	3:11
2.	"I Don't Like the Drugs (But the Drugs Like Me)" (Absinth Makes The Heart Grow Fonder) (Remix by The Black Dog)	5:29
3.	"I Can't See Why" (Performed by Baxter)	4:50
4.	"Rock Is Dead" (Enhanced Music Video)	3:10

UK-exclusive 10" picture disc (Maverick: W486TE)
No.	Title	Length
1.	"Rock Is Dead"	3:11
2.	"I Don't Like the Drugs (But the Drugs Like Me)" (Every Day) (Remix by The Black Dog)	5:20

US promotional CD (Nothing: INT5P-0540)
No.	Title	Length
1.	"Rock Is Dead" (Clean Radio Edit)	3:10

US promotional 12" single (Nothing: 497 200–1)
No.	Title	Length
1.	"Rock Is Dead"	3:11
2.	"Astonishing Panorama of the Endtimes"	3:59

== Credits and personnel ==
Credits adapted from the liner notes of Mechanical Animals.

Marilyn Manson

- Marilyn Manson – vocals and production
- Twiggy Ramirez – electric and bass guitars
- Madonna Wayne Gacy – keyboards
- Ginger Fish – live drums

Technical personnel

- Tom Lord-Alge – mixing
- Sean Beavan – engineering, additional production
- Michael Beinhorn – producer

== Charts ==
Chart (1999)	Peak position
Scotland Singles (OCC)	23
Spain (AFYVE)	34
UK Singles (OCC)	23
US Mainstream Rock (Billboard)	28
US Alternative Airplay (Billboard)	30
