= I Don't Like the Drugs (But the Drugs Like Me) =

Single by Marilyn Manson

from the album Mechanical Animals
- Released: February 17, 1999
- Genre: Glam rock
- Length: 5:03
- Label: Nothing; Interscope
- Songwriters: Marilyn Manson; Twiggy Ramirez; Zim Zum
- Producers: Manson; Michael Beinhorn

Marilyn Manson singles chronology
"The Dope Show" (1998)	"I Don't Like the Drugs (But the Drugs Like Me)" (1999)	"Rock Is Dead" (1999)

"I Don't Like the Drugs (But the Drugs Like Me)" is a song by American rock band Marilyn Manson. It was released as the second single from their third studio album, Mechanical Animals (1998). It was written by the band's eponymous frontman, along with bassist Twiggy Ramirez and then-guitarist Zim Zum, and was produced by Manson and Michael Beinhorn. A glam rock song inspired by drugs, television, and religion, the track features a gospel choir and a guitar solo by Dave Navarro of Jane's Addiction.

The song garnered a mostly positive response from music critics, who complimented its catchiness and memorability. Critics noted similarities between "I Don't Like the Drugs (But the Drugs Like Me)" and the music of David Bowie, particularly his song "Fame" (1975), as well as the work of Manson's contemporaries. The song's stance on drugs garnered differing interpretations; some critics felt it glamorized drug use, while others saw it as anti-drug. Its music video was directed by Paul Hunter, and features an androgynous Manson attached to a cross made of television sets and a series of vignettes. Critics praised the video's imagery and found it critical of both capitalism and the pharmaceutical industry. Commercially, the single peaked within the top 40 of Billboard's Alternative Songs and Mainstream Rock charts, as well as the national charts of New Zealand and Spain.

== Background ==
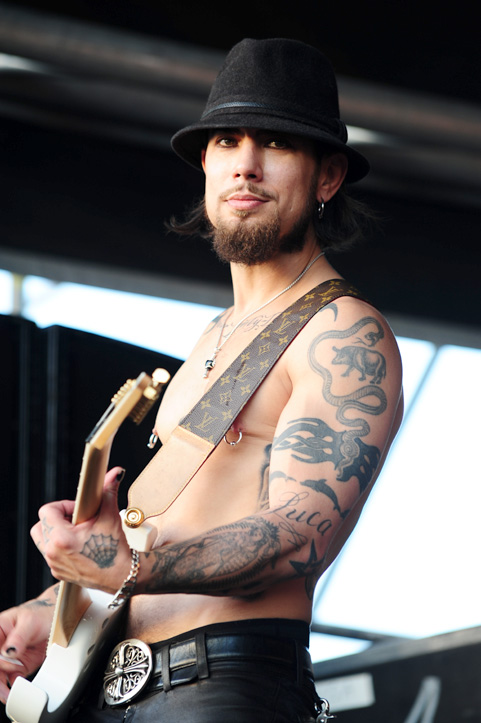
Dave Navarro played the guitar solo on the track.

After the release of Antichrist Superstar (1996), an album which sparked controversy among Christian fundamentalists, Marilyn Manson didn't want to resume playing the role of a bogeyman. He feared that this would cause him to be "consigned to the one-note rock theatricality" of Kiss and Alice Cooper. He desired to convince casual rock and pop fans who had previously dismissed him that he was "more than a cartoon". For his next album, Mechanical Animals (1998), he took inspiration from the glam rock music that David Bowie made in the 1970s, and adopted a wardrobe and hairstyle similar to Bowie's.

The album featured numerous references to drugs, some of them positive. Manson told the Los Angeles Times in 1998 that "I advocate the use of drugs, but have always looked down on the abuse of drugs. The people who misuse them give the rest of us a bad name, and I'm not only talking about street drugs. There are a lot of references in the album to the prescripted lifestyle that a lot people have followed and numbed out their emotions and become mechanical." According to Manson, "I Don't Like the Drugs (But the Drugs Like Me)" was inspired by literal drugs as well as television and religion, both of which Manson deemed "metaphorical" drugs. Manson described it as "the most hollow anthem on the record".

He recruited Dave Navarro of the Red Hot Chili Peppers and Jane's Addiction to play the guitar solo at the end of the track, and a trio of black gospel singers to sing the song's refrain. Navarro was rumored to be struggling with drug addiction at the time; Manson refused to confirm whether this was true or not. When Navarro recorded the guitar solo, he was shirtless. During a session with Manson, Navarro and the gospel singers, 1970s teen idol Leif Garrett unexpectedly entered the room. Manson deemed this session "one of the more memorable moments in rock'n'roll history" and compared it to a work of pop art. Manson said "What took place after [Garrett arrived] can't be said; the music can only make you feel it."

== Musical and lyrical composition ==
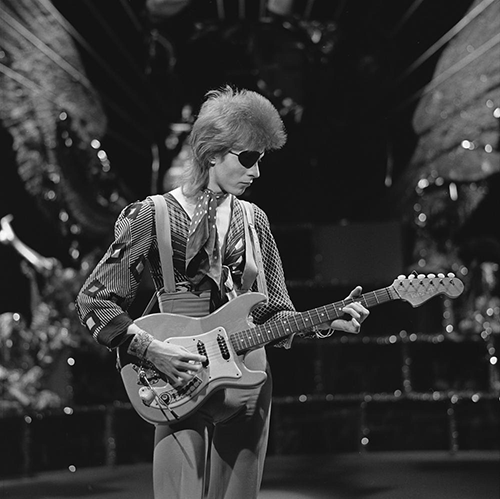
"I Don't Like the Drugs (But the Drugs Like Me)" garnered comparisons to the music of David Bowie.

"I Don't Like The Drugs (But The Drugs Like Me)"
A 30-second sample of "I Don't Like the Drugs (But the Drugs Like Me)", a glam rock song.

"I Don't Like the Drugs (But the Drugs Like Me)" is a glam rock song with a length of five minutes and three seconds. The song was written by Manson with the band's bassist Twiggy Ramirez, and its then-guitarist Zim Zum, and produced by Manson with Michael Beinhorn; it also features elements of electronic rock, funk, and soul music. Lorraine Ali of Rolling Stone contrasted the song with some of the band's earlier work, saying that on the track, "Manson sings his lines rather than hissing or shrieking them".

Manson repeats the song's title during its chorus, while the verses find him imagining "a life where not all the sex has to be missionary." The verses recall the music of Stevie Wonder, and feature Hammond organ flourishes and muted, wah-wah guitar. The bridge of the song features guitar playing characteristic of Europop. The track's final chorus showcases the gospel choir, who sing the song's refrain. Team Rock, Billboard, and NME each noted similarities between "I Don't Like the Drugs (But the Drugs Like Me)" and "Fame" (1975) by David Bowie, while Exclaim!'s Liisa Ladouceur felt that the song sounds like Rob Zombie covering Bowie's "Fashion" (1980). NME found the track's electronic rock elements reminiscent of both Garbage and the late 1990s recordings of The Smashing Pumpkins. Paul Carr of PopMatters felt that "Kill4Me", a song recorded later by the band for their 2017 album Heaven Upside Down, had a "vibe" identical to that of "I Don't Like the Drugs (But the Drugs Like Me)".

In "I Don't Like the Drugs (But the Drugs Like Me)", Manson sings "There's a hole in our soul that we fill with dope", which found several commentators offering conflicting interpretations of the song's stance on drugs. PluggedIn's Bob Waliszewski viewed "I Don't Like the Drugs (But the Drugs Like Me)" as one of several tracks on Mechanical Animals that glamorizes drug use, contrasting it with the anti-drug sentiments present in another song on the album, "Coma White". According to Kenneth Partridge of Billboard, "I Don't Like the Drugs (But the Drugs Like Me)" portrays "Illicit substances...[as] the antidote to living the white-bread life available to most Americans." Conversely, The New York Times' Jon Pareles viewed the song as anti-drug.

== Critical reception ==
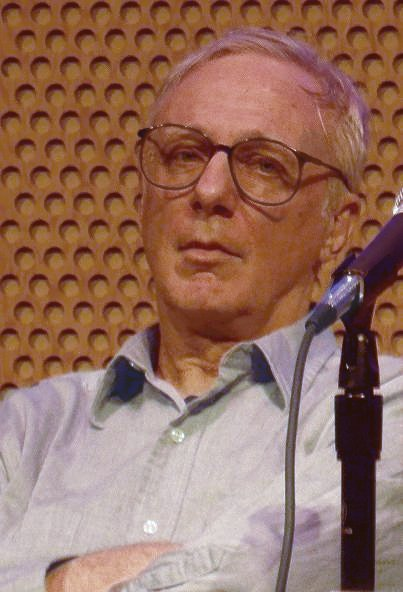
Robert Christgau praised "I Don't Like the Drugs (But the Drugs Like Me)".

Kenneth Partridge of Billboard included "I Don't Like the Drugs (But the Drugs Like Me)" on his list of the "15 Best Songs About Drugs", alongside tracks like Bob Dylan's "Rainy Day Women ♯12 & 35" (1966), Jefferson Airplane's "White Rabbit" (1967), and The Weeknd's "Can't Feel My Face" (2015). Partridge described the track's message as "a conservative parent’s worst nightmare." Stereogum's Joseph Shafer rated the track fourth on his list of the ten best Marilyn Manson songs, calling it "the most humorous and infectious" of Mechanical Animals' "choice cuts". Exclaim!'s Liisa Ladouceur praised the song's "shiny production and sleazy swagger," saying that it remained memorable years after its release. Robert Christgau deemed "I Don't Like the Drugs (But the Drugs Like Me)" and "The Dope Show" the catchiest songs on Mechanical Animals.

Sputnikmusic's Simon K. described "I Don't Like the Drugs (But the Drugs Like Me)" and "Rock Is Dead" as album highlights that "you’ll find yourself humming...for days." Chad Childers of Loudwire praised Navarro's "slick" guitar solo and wrote "the song has remained a favorite among Manson fans over the years." Similarly, Brad Miska of Bloody Disgusting said that "I Don't Like the Drugs (But the Drugs Like Me)" is one of the songs from Mechanical Animals that Manson's fans find the most memorable. MTV's Gil Kaufman saw the song as part of a revival of glam rock that took place in the 1990s. According to Kaufman, other examples of this revival included Spacehog's "In the Meantime" (1995), the title track of Hole's Celebrity Skin (1998), and Todd Haynes' Velvet Goldmine (1998), a film about a David Bowie-esque rock singer.

Writing for the Houston Press, Kristy Loye deemed "I Don't Like the Drugs (But the Drugs Like Me)" one of Manson's greatest hit songs. Lorainne Ali of Rolling Stone called it a "cacophony of voices chanting the title on top of guitar work by Dave Navarro". Ali went on to praise Manson's vocal performance, saying "surprisingly, he sounds pretty good." Entertainment Weekly's David Browne panned the title of the song for attempting to be shocking. Annalee Newitz of Salon said that the track was one of the album's "bad judgment blips", writing that "'I Don't Like the Drugs (But the Drugs Like Me),' with its misplaced soul backing vocals and Billy Squire-esque [sic] sound, made it onto the album for entirely mysterious reasons."

== Music video ==
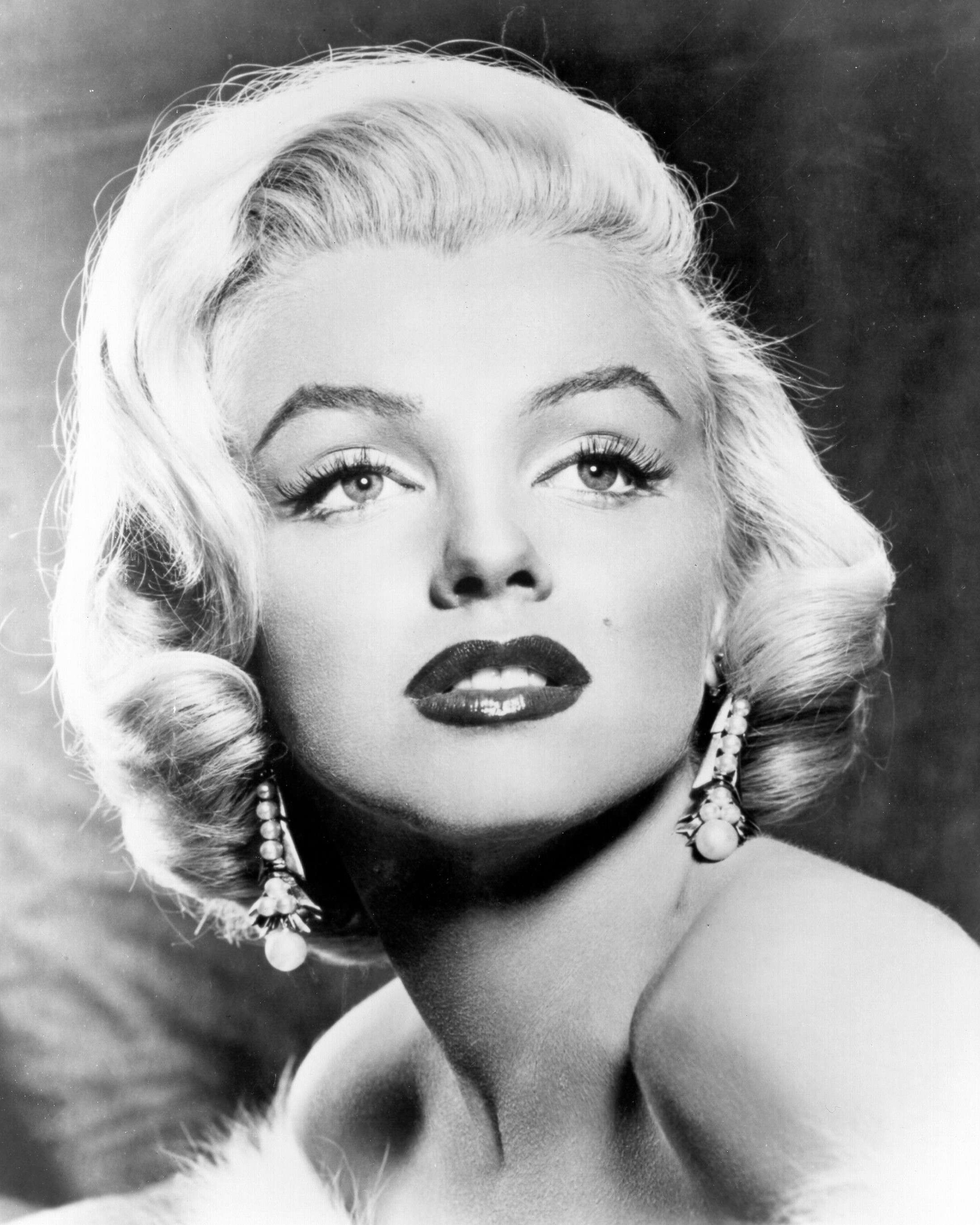
Manson's hair in the video is reminiscent of Marilyn Monroe's; Monroe was one of the band's namesakes.

The music video for "I Don't Like the Drugs (But the Drugs Like Me)" was directed by Paul Hunter, who had previously directed the video for "The Dope Show". Like Mechanical Animals, the video was inspired by the work of David Bowie. Discussing the video's concept in 1999, Manson said "In the video I suggest TV and religion together as being the drug I'm talking about the most." The video features constant contrasts between a saturated light color palette and a saturated dark color palette. In the clip, Manson is shown attached to a cross made out of television sets. He wears white, androgynous clothing similar to Bowie's fashion, and appears to lack melanin. His hair is fair and reminiscent of Marilyn Monroe's; alongside Charles Manson, Monroe served as the band's namesake. Vignettes in the video depict a family with abnormally large eyes who are implied to be abusing drugs, Manson being chased by headless policemen, and a reality television program similar to The Jerry Springer Show. On the program, a woman is shown pregnant with a television set.

=== Reception and analysis ===
In Against and Beyond: Subversion and Transgression in Mass Media, Popular Culture and Performance, Emilia Borowska writes that "In [the video's] nightmarish vision, the individuals fall prey to the homogenized, banalised and stupefying culture of contemporary capitalism." Borowska also said that the clip depicts "the media and Christianity as sources of repression, control, and imprisonment." Chris Ford of Noisecreep ranked the video for "I Don't Like the Drugs (But the Drugs Like Me)" fourth on his list of the ten best Marilyn Manson videos, saying that it's "full to the brim with strange, sometimes confusing visuals". Ford said that the video's aesthetic was suitable for a glam rock song. AXS TV's Nicole Cormier felt that the video was critical of the pharmaceutical industry, and praised the video for making "morbidity look beautiful", adding: "Although [it's] less dark than previous [Marilyn Manson] videos, the deep message and interpretive expression makes this one just as captivating." Writing for Bloody Disgusting, Jonathan Barkan commended the clip's "rather fascinating" visuals but said that its use of color makes it "difficult...to watch without getting a headache."

== Track listing ==
European CD single 1

1. "I Don't Like the Drugs (But the Drugs Like Me)" – 5:03
2. "I Don't Like the Drugs (But the Drugs Like Me)" (Every Day) – 5:22
3. "I Don't Like the Drugs (But the Drugs Like Me)" (Absinth Makes the Heart Grow Fonder) – 5:29

UK CD single 2

1. "I Don't Like the Drugs (But the Drugs Like Me)" (Infected by the Scourge of the Earth) – 5:41
2. "I Don't Like the Drugs (But the Drugs Like Me)" (Danny Saber Remix) – 5:16
3. "I Don't Like the Drugs (But the Drugs Like Me)" – 5:03
4. Drugs Screen Saver

UK 10" vinyl single (remixes)

1. "I Don't Like the Drugs (But the Drugs Like Me)" (Infected by the Scourge of the Earth) – 5:41
2. "I Don't Like the Drugs (But the Drugs Like Me)" (Danny Saber Remix) – 5:16
3. "I Don't Like the Drugs (But the Drugs Like Me)" (Every Day) – 5:41
4. "I Don't Like the Drugs (But the Drugs Like Me)" (Absinth Makes the Heart Grow Fonder) – 5:29

Australian CD single

1. "I Don't Like the Drugs (But the Drugs Like Me)" – 5:03
2. "I Don't Like the Drugs (But the Drugs Like Me)" (Radio Edit) – 4:16
3. "I Don't Like the Drugs (But the Drugs Like Me)" (Danny Saber Remix) – 5:16
4. "The Beautiful People" (Live) – 4:33

Japanese CD single

1. "I Don't Like the Drugs (But the Drugs Like Me)" (Infected by the Scourge of the Earth) – 5:41
2. "I Don't Like the Drugs (But the Drugs Like Me)" (Danny Saber Remix) – 5:16
3. "I Don't Like the Drugs (But the Drugs Like Me)" (Every Day) – 5:22
4. "I Don't Like the Drugs (But the Drugs Like Me)" (Absinth Makes the Heart Grow Fonder) – 5:29
5. "I Don't Like the Drugs (But the Drugs Like Me)" – 5:03

== Personnel ==
Credits adapted from the liner notes of Mechanical Animals.

Marilyn Manson

- Marilyn Manson – lyrics, vocals, producer
- Twiggy Ramirez – music, bass, rhythm guitar
- Zim Zum – music, additional lead guitar
- Madonna Wayne Gacy – keyboards
- Ginger Fish – drums

Additional musicians and technical personnel

- Tom Lord-Alge – mixing
- Sean Beavan – engineering, additional production
- Michael Beinhorn – producer
- Alexandra Brown – background vocals
- Lynn Davis – background vocals
- Niki Haris – background vocals
- Dave Navarro – outro guitar solo
- Danny Saber – clavinet, synthesizer string and programming
- John West – background vocals

== Charts ==
Chart (1999)	Peak position
Australia (ARIA)	45
Netherlands (Single Top 100)	83
New Zealand (Recorded Music NZ)	35
Spain (AFYVE)	9
US Alternative Airplay (Billboard)	36
US Mainstream Rock (Billboard)	25

== See also ==
- List of songs recorded by Marilyn Manson
