= Mechanical Animals =

1998 album by Marilyn Manson

Studio album by Marilyn Manson
- Released: September 15, 1998
- Recorded: 1997–1998
- Studios: Conway (Hollywood); Westlake (Hollywood); The White Room (Boston)
- Genres: Glam rock; industrial metal; electronic rock; gothic metal
- Length: 62:37
- Labels: Nothing; Interscope
- Producers: Michael Beinhorn; Sean Beavan; Marilyn Manson

Marilyn Manson chronology
Remix & Repent (1997)	Mechanical Animals (1998)	The Last Tour on Earth (1999)

Singles from Mechanical Animals
- 1. "The Dope Show" Released: September 15, 1998; 2. "I Don't Like the Drugs (But the Drugs Like Me)" Released: February 17, 1999; 3. "Rock Is Dead" Released: June 14, 1999; 4. "Coma White" Released: September 20, 1999

Mechanical Animals is the third studio album by American rock band Marilyn Manson. It was released on September 15, 1998, by Interscope Records. While not abandoning the band's industrial metal roots, the album is less abrasive and more reminiscent of 1970s glam rock, such as David Bowie, T. Rex and Queen. The themes of Mechanical Animals primarily deal with the trappings of fame and drug abuse.

The rock opera and concept album is the second installment in a trilogy also including 1996's Antichrist Superstar and 2000's Holy Wood (In the Shadow of the Valley of Death). Manson said in November 2000 that the overarching story within the trilogy is presented in reverse chronological order; Mechanical Animals, therefore, acts as the bridge connecting the two narratives and remains constant whether the trilogy is viewed in reverse or not.

The album has been certified platinum in the United States, Canada, and New Zealand, and spawned the singles "The Dope Show", "Rock Is Dead", and "I Don't Like the Drugs (But the Drugs Like Me)" as well as the promotional single, "Coma White". The former has been certified gold in Sweden. The album debuted at No. 1 on the Billboard 200, making it the first Marilyn Manson album to do so.

== Recording and production ==
=== Aborted sessions with the Dust Brothers ===
Most people, by the standard dictionary definition, are androids. There's no reason to envision a sci-fi world of people with metal inside of them — already, people that walk around look like human beings, but they don't act like it. They don't express any kind of creativity, they don't show any emotions — they've dumbed themselves down with drugs, with television, with religion.

— Marilyn Manson

Following the conclusion of their year-long Dead to the World Tour in September 1997, the band relocated from Fort Lauderdale, Florida to Hollywood, California. Work on Mechanical Animals began soon after. By early December of that year, the singer began opening up on the then new and unnamed record's development, sitting down with MTV's "Year in Rock" special on December 12. Early on, it was reported the new album would be produced by the Los Angeles-based production team, the Dust Brothers. According to MTV News, "[They] have completed work on a few tracks on the next effort from Marilyn Manson..."

During this early development stage, the band recorded in Manson's home recording studio in the Hollywood Hills which the group had taken to calling "The White Room" after the vocalist painted the space white. Manson explained that the studio "looked out over Hollywood, which kind of represented space to us." Manson also intoned, "the theme of whiteness comes up a lot on the album, representing a void empty of color and feelings and emotions. We were trying to fill that void with the songs."

=== Billy Corgan involvement ===
Manson's friend, the Smashing Pumpkins frontman Billy Corgan, served as an unofficial music consultant for the band. After playing a few of the early songs for him, Corgan advised that "This is definitely the right direction" but to "go all the way with it. Don't hint at it." Despite this, almost 20 years after the release of Mechanical Animals, keyboardist Madonna Wayne Gacy (who left the band in the intervening years) disputed "arrogant-yet-whiny ass" Corgan's involvement and claimed "the majority" of the album was "written long before Billy Corgan ever showed up." He went on to describe Corgan as pretentious and "thinks he's Brian Eno."

=== Sessions with Michael Beinhorn and Sean Beavan ===
The band subsequently employed Michael Beinhorn as principal producer, co-producing the record with Marilyn Manson. Sean Beavan was also brought in to supply additional production work. According to Manson, the bulk of the material was written and recorded at that house before Beinhorn came on board. "For the most part, I had a very specific vision of what I wanted to do and how to do it."

By May of that year, having completed his obligations for Hole's then-new album, Celebrity Skin, Beinhorn confirmed that the nascent Manson project was halfway complete and on course for a late summer or early fall release. Manson, for his part, spent the early part of the year on break from the studio to promote his autobiography, The Long Hard Road Out Of Hell.

During his February 24, 1998, interview on National Public Radio's Fresh Air radio talk show to promote the book, he divulged that having exhausted the topic of organized religion in the previous record, Mechanical Animals would see a major shift in focus: "Both sonically and lyrically it's about the depression of alienation, rather than the aggressiveness of it. It's about the emptiness." Guitarist Zim Zum divulged that in one instance the band recorded a song a day for two weeks straight during a particular spree of creativity.

Final mixing and post-production took place in a studio in Burbank, California. In July 1998, after having contributed guitar work to 12 (Note: The album's liner notes actually credit Zim Zum with only eight songs.) of the album's 14 tracks, Zim Zum left the band under amicable terms to pursue his own solo project. He was replaced by the former guitarist of English industrial metal band 2wo, John Lowery (rechristened by the band as John 5).

== Concept and themes ==
If 'Antichrist Superstar' was sort of my comparative fall from grace, Lucifer being kicked from heaven, this next record is about what happens on Earth now, (It's about) sort of trying to fit into a society that thinks it's full of emotions and that you're a callous person, when in fact you're the one that actually has all these feelings and it's the world that's kind of numb to them. It's almost the antithesis of what I just did.

— Marilyn Manson discussing the then unnamed album's principal motif with MTV News.

In the album, Manson takes on the role of a glam rocking, substance-addicted, gender ambiguous "alien messiah" called Omēga. Much like David Bowie's Ziggy Stardust, he falls down to earth, is captured, placed with a band called The Mechanical Animals and turned into a rock star product. He has become numb to the world, either lost or high in outer space or the Hollywood Hills, through excessive drug use as a coping mechanism with his life as a product of his corporate masters. Manson's other role is that of Alpha who is based on himself and his experiences around the conclusion of the Antichrist Superstar tour/era. Acting as Omēga's foil, Alpha's emotions have only begun seeping back. Vulnerable and trying to relearn how to use them properly, he despairs about how little emotion other people feel, observing them to be "mechanical animals".

"There is a bit of a love story that exists on this record," Manson admits. "The name I gave to the thing I was in love with was Coma White. It starts as the name of a girl I'm in love with, then ends up to really be a drug I've been taking. So I'm not really sure what I'm in love with."

Subsequently, seven of the 14 songs are from the perspective, lyrically and musically, of Omēga and his fictional band The Mechanical Animals, while the other seven are by Alpha (Marilyn Manson). The Omēga songs are typically those most nihilistic and superficial lyrically, such as "The Dope Show", "User Friendly" and "New Model No. 15". The album artwork features a dual liner note book, in which one half has lyrics for the Omēga songs, and when flipped over, has those for the Alpha songs.

Marilyn Manson later noted in an interview with Rolling Stone magazine that "Mechanical Animals was to represent the point where the revolution got sold out, a hollow shell of what the essence of Marilyn Manson was. It was a satire, and a lot of people interpreted it as 'This is what he really is.' I was making a mockery of what I was, taking a shot at myself."

After the release of Holy Wood (In the Shadow of the Valley of Death), Marilyn Manson revealed that his concept album trilogy is an autobiographical story told in a reverse timeline (chronologically reverse from their actual release dates). That means Holy Wood opens the storyline followed by Mechanical Animals and concluded with Antichrist Superstar. Further, though Antichrist Superstar and Mechanical Animals made sense as individual concept albums on their own, there was a hidden overarching story running through the three releases. In transitioning from Mechanical Animals to Holy Wood (In the Shadow of the Valley of Death), Manson admitted that the character of Omēga, "[...] was a ruse to lure commercial mall-goers into the web of destruction – I've always planned that from the beginning."

== Composition and style ==
"The album is like feeling for the first time", Manson said. "Everything is oversensitized, pain is more extreme and love is more extreme – hence the change in the music, which is more in the bombastic tradition of Queen and Bowie. Some bands are afraid of not sounding hard all the time – I'm not. In a lot of ways it is more mainstream, but I'm more mainstream. I don't think I've sold myself out – I've adapted to my surroundings."

— Marilyn Manson

Mechanical Animals, while not abandoning the industrial metal and gothic metal of the band's previous work, draws more heavily from 1970s glam rock. Critics noted that it modernized the style as electronic rock, akin to Garbage and Adore-era The Smashing Pumpkins. Manson explained that he had grown "bored" with the band's prior aesthetic: "everything you hear nowadays is an offshoot of NIN, Marilyn Manson, Ministry. There's just no great rock albums anymore. There's a lot of rock music out there, but it's very bland and disposable. A lot of people may say this record is over the top, pretentious and theatrical, but that's what rock music is supposed to be about." Mechanical Animals also marked the first time NIN frontman Trent Reznor provided no production input.

In both music and imagery, Mechanical Animals draws heavily from the glam rock genre that dominated the UK Charts in the early 1970s. Rolling Stone noted the songs are marked by shimmering, flamboyant guitar grooves and strong melodic hooks while the lyrics "trade the topic of teen satanism for drug-addled space themes and sci-fi love stories", reflecting "Manson's self-proclaimed new 'glitterati' lifestyle," and described his crooning as evocative of "the sultry vibe of T. Rex's Marc Bolan". However, both Rolling Stone and Entertainment Weekly noted that while the album drew from glam rock, it did not revel in the "naughty-boy insouciance" and playful hedonism of the genre despite numerous references to drugs, decadence and lurid sexual escapades. Rather, it was "glum and pessimistic" and more preoccupied with the themes of alienation, insincerity and longing (through sci-fi allusions) only hinted at by the genre.

"I just wanted to approach this album from a different point of view. I'd assumed the role of destroyer on the last record. This role is more a savior. I wanted to write songs that were more personal and dealt with specific emotions. The music had to really compliment that, but there wasn't a conscious effort to make more accessible songs. There was simply an effort to write songs that would make people feel differently to the songs on the last album. In a sense that makes it more accessible, but it's not just for the sake of pop. Even if it was, that's okay too. I can appreciate the Spice Girls and Garth Brooks in the Andy Warhol sense of it - pop art."

Its ultimate sources are the goths: Bauhaus, Love and Rockets, and early Cure. 'The Speed of Pain', meanwhile, is redolent of Pink Floyd's 'Welcome to the Machine'.

The song "Great Big White World" raised concerns, among some groups, of possibly being a racially motivated reference until Manson himself cleared up the rumors by stating that it was about cocaine. "I Don't Like the Drugs (But the Drugs Like Me)" features guitar work by Dave Navarro.

== Release and artwork ==
At a time before the ubiquity of peer-to-peer file sharing, the first singles from both Beinhorn-produced albums were leaked three weeks before their intended release dates and played "nearly a dozen times" on New York radio station WXRK (92.3 FM) and its Los Angeles-based sister station, KROQ-FM (106.7 FM), on the weekend of July 31 to August 2, 1998. Interscope neither confirmed nor denied that the leak originated from them but joined Hole's label, DGC Records, in issuing a cease and desist order to WXRK on August 3.

In spite of this the Manson single, "The Dope Show", was subsequently recorded and converted by a fan into an MP3 and made available on an unofficial fan site for download soon after. The following weekend, San Francisco radio station Live 105 (105.3 FM) played both singles again.

=== Artwork and packaging ===
The image represents how I see myself and how I think the world sees me in a lot of ways—androgynous and sexless at the same time ... that's kind of the vulnerable way I see myself on this record.

— Marilyn Manson on the album cover.

The controversial cover art has won critical acclaim and numerous awards. The infamous photo depicts Manson as an androgynous naked figure with breasts, six fingers and airbrushed genitalia. It is the brainchild of New York City-based photographer Joseph Cultice. Designer Paul Brown has said of the cover, "I'm extremely proud of it. I said more in one of his covers than any novel could. It made people think and cringe." In 2003, VH1 included Mechanical Animals at number 29 in its list of the "50 Greatest Album Covers". It is also featured in Grant Scott's book The Greatest Album Covers of All Time.

Contrary to popular internet rumors, the band leader, Manson, did not undergo any plastic surgery for this androgynous, alien look. The breasts are prosthetic, manufactured specially by Screaming Mad George and his now-defunct company SMG Effects. Manson is, in reality, naked and covered head to toe in latex paint, provided by the same movie make-up company. His genitalia are covered by a foam latex appliance to create the androgynous appearance of the alien figure he calls Omēga, which, the singer explained, represents "sexlessness and vulnerability," in addition to his own "affection for prosthetic limbs." Originally the make up consisted of six breasts with nipples. Manson has stated in interviews that his friend, actor Johnny Depp, is the current owner of these prosthetic breasts, which Manson traded for Depp's strawberry-blonde wig worn in the 2001 film Blow.

Alternate cover for the fictitious band Omēga and the Mechanical Animals

Kerrang! noted that the cover art text forms an anagram for 'Marilyn Manson Is An Alchemical Man'. The album also features an alternate, less "obscene" cover which is contained on the reverse side of the album liner notes. It is incidentally the cover for an album of the same name by Omēga and the Mechanical Animals, a fictitious band composed of characters played by the members of Marilyn Manson. The photo featured on this alternative cover art includes more of the symbolism surrounding the numeral 15.

The liner notes also contain hidden messages in yellow text, which become viewable when seen through the blue CD packaging or the transparent blue LP. The reader of the liner notes is shown how to read these messages in the booklet: there is a diagram showing a CD case over the booklet, and a message which reads: "Yellow and blue = green." (Note: The hidden messages include: 1.) www.comawhite.com (sidenote: this website is no longer available). 2.) I no longer knew if Coma White was real or just a side effect [sic]. 3.) Now children it's time for recess, please roll up your sleeves. 3.) A sun with no planets, burning in circles. 4.) Even machines can see that we are dead. 5.) In the end I became them and I led them/ After all none of us really qualified as humans/ We were hardworn, automatic and as hollow as the 'o' in God/ I reattached my emotions cellular and narcotic/ From the top of Hollywood it looked like space/ Millions of capsules and Mechanical Animals/ A city filled with dead stars and a girl I called Comawhite/ This is my Omēga.)

A limited tour edition of Mechanical Animals was released in the UK (including other locations like Australia and Mexico, where only 100 copies of this edition arrived) with an illustrated hardcover sleeve by Marcus Wild. Though limited edition, the album is easily attainable in certain regions. The packaging is identical to the original version except for the bonus eight-page comic book by Wild, illustrating scenes from the "I Don't Like the Drugs (But the Drugs Like Me)" music video.

=== Retailer ban ===
The shock of the image was increased because it looked like a real photograph..

— The Greatest Album Covers of All Time

As early as August 14, 1998, a month before the release, the three largest retailers in the United States—K-Mart, Wal-Mart and Target—refused to stock the album citing the offensive cover and the expectation that it will carry a Parental Advisory sticker for violating their policy of not selling material with explicit lyrics or content. In an attempt to appease some of the retailers, Nothing and Interscope discussed plans to cover the "breasts" with a sticker and enclose the entire package in blue cellophane—similar to the brown paper bag tactic employed exactly 30 years before by distributors on the explicitly nude cover of John Lennon and Yoko Ono's Unfinished Music No.1: Two Virgins. Wal-Mart still refused to sell the album, and consequently pulled all previous albums by Manson in light of the Columbine High School massacre on April 20, 1999.

In the intervening two decades since the release of this album, all three retailers have had a change of heart: 2003 saw the mass sale of Manson's fifth LP, The Golden Age of Grotesque in nearly all Wal-Marts; representatives claimed they chose to sell the album because it was "commercially viable" and was "on the Top Ten charts." They now carry the band's entire discography, including this record, in both their online and retail stores.

== Promotion and singles ==
Five days before the album's release, the band performed "The Dope Show" at the 1998 MTV Video Music Awards. The "Ziggy-in-Vegas" performance saw Manson strut into the stage in a blue vinyl coat with a faux-fur collar before stripping down, mid-way into the song, to a blue skin-tight costume with cut-outs that revealed the prosthetic breasts and androgynous genitalia of his Omēga character. The performance also included a trio of "besequined" back-up singers that harmonized with the frontman as he sang along. Rolling Stone remarked that "incontrovertibly, Marilyn Manson stole the show."

The album's most successful song is "The Dope Show", which fared well on both video and single charts in the United States and abroad. "The Dope Show" was written by Manson (lyrics) and Twiggy Ramirez (music). It continues to reign as the band's most commercially successful song. The music video debuted the band's controversial new, androgynous glam rock sound and image to the world. It is inspired by Alejandro Jodorowsky's art film The Holy Mountain as well as the David Bowie film, The Man Who Fell to Earth. Again, Bowie's influence has been enormous on this album, with both influences noted publicly by Manson himself.

The third single, "Rock Is Dead", was featured in the accompanying soundtrack of the film The Matrix—the song is played during the end credits.

=== Tours ===
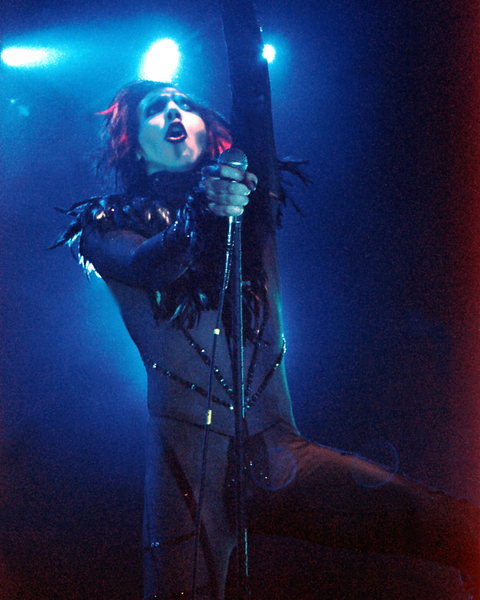
Manson performing on the Mechanical Animals Tour in 1998

Following the release of Mechanical Animals, Marilyn Manson staged two worldwide stadium tours, titled the Mechanical Animals Tour and Rock Is Dead Tour.

A concert film was recorded depicting both tours, titled God Is in the TV. It was released on November 2, 1999, in VHS format by Interscope Records and features live concert footage of 13 songs culled from various concerts across the world as well as backstage and behind-the-scenes clips.

==== Mechanical Animals Tour ====
After declining a headlining slot at the Lollapalooza summer music festival (along with numerous other bands) in early 1998 due to delays in Mechanical Animals' release, the band launched the first of their own headlining tours in support of the album. It was originally intended to start on June 25, 1998, with a series of six festival dates in Europe lasting until July 12, 1998. However the planned summer European leg was scrapped and the tour's launch date was rescheduled to October 25, 1998, after drummer Ginger Fish became ill with mononucleosis.

Beginning on October 25, 1998, and lasting until January 31, 1999, the Mechanical Animals Tour included two legs spanning a Fall to Winter World Tour in Europe, Japan, and North America and a 6 show headlining stint at the Big Day Out tour in Australia. In total, the band completed 46 shows out of the 52 originally planned.

==== Beautiful Monsters Tour and Rock Is Dead Tour ====
Beginning on February 28, 1999, and lasting until August 8, 1999, the tour included three legs spanning Europe, Japan and North America with a total of 9 completed shows for the Beautiful Monsters Tour and 43 completed shows (out of 46 planned) for the Rock Is Dead Tour.

The tour is particularly notable for a number of incidents that plagued its progress. Following the conclusion of the Mechanical Animals Tour in January 1999, the band was once again offered a headlining slot by the organizers of the Lollapalooza festival for the 1999 summer season (this time as part of an attempt to resurrect the by-then-defunct festival) which they declined. Instead, the band struck a deal with Hole to co-headline the latter's Beautiful Monsters Tour. Immediately, the joint venture began experiencing problems due to disputes between both groups' leaders. After nine shows (spanning a total of two weeks) the tour imploded, resulting in Hole's departure on March 14, 1999, and the tour being renamed Rock Is Dead. Monster Magnet, who were already opening for Manson, assumed Hole's place on the tour's playbill. A minor dispute erupted surrounding the tour's revised nomenclature as Korn and Rob Zombie were already in the middle of another tour with the same name.

The first two performances of the Rock Is Dead Tour were canceled after Manson suffered a hairline fracture on one of his ankles during the final show with Hole at The Forum in Los Angeles. The tour was resumed on March 17, 1999. The tour, however, would stagger yet again following the Columbine High School massacre on April 20, 1999. In the ensuing aftermath, the band was accused of being a cause of the tragedy in Littleton, prompting the group to cancel their remaining North American engagements out of respect for the victims, explaining, "It's not a great atmosphere to be out playing rock 'n' roll shows, for us or the fans."

== Critical reception ==
Professional ratings
Review scores
Source	Rating
AllMusic	4/5 stars
Chicago Sun-Times	3/4 stars
Entertainment Weekly	A−
The Guardian	3/5 stars
Los Angeles Times	4/4 stars
NME	7/10
Rolling Stone	3.5/5 stars
The Rolling Stone Album Guide	3.5/5 stars
USA Today	3.5/4 stars
The Village Voice	C+

The album received acclaim from most music critics. Analyzing the album's intentions, Barry Walters of The Village Voice noted, "Mechanical Animals celebrates sexy celebrity in a typically Mansonian bacchanalia of contradictions. He's said all along that dirty media dominance is the cleanest and closest thing to divinity in a world that crucified the god in itself and replaced it with blind faith. Now he understands first-hand that stardom sucks, yet while he lifts a platform boot against its phony fat ass he still can't help reveling in the excess. Antichrist Superstar critiqued fame in order to make him famous. Having been there/done that, Manson wants more because more is the American way he's hell-bent on subverting—even as he's soaking in it." Of the record's musical direction Walters noted, "Flexing far more range than rage, Manson's feminization shifts his vocal power center from a diseased gut to a broken heart. [...] Guitars roar and whine, bass booms, drums race, and synths twitter with a tweeness that's gonna turn Durannie grannie Nick Rhodes's gray roots green."

USA Today praised that "Manson and producer Michael Beinhorn have rediscovered the adrenalin in '70s glam-rock, sprinkling Gary Glitter and Ziggy Stardust over Gothic theatrics." Jon Wiederhorn of Amazon observed that "Mechanical Animals is a brash, decadent, and glittery display of self-indulgent hooks and melodramatic vocals that sounds like Aladdin Sane-era David Bowie and T. Rex at their most boisterous crossed with the more modern sounds of today's industrial nation." According to Ann Powers of Rolling Stone, "Mechanical Animals gets its cavelike spaciousness from [goth] influences and tweaks them with an industrial crunch [...] He and his band approach its terrain the way a 1960s rocker like Eric Clapton approaches the blues, with respect and a sense of entitlement." Annalee Newitz of Salon noted the band's shift from a "dour preoccupation with religious fascism and toward space-age genderfuck chic. The creamy synth sound and drugged-out lyrics that dominate Manson's latest CD prove that two antithetical '80s musical genres—heavy metal and new wave—can indeed be fruitfully combined."

David Browne of Entertainment Weekly wrote, "Looking back in mascara'd anger, Manson and [producer Michael] Beinhorn have fashioned music steeped in glam rock and concept-album bombast but updated with a crunching intensity [...] He layers the songs with cooing backup singers, electronica burbles, skulking guitars, and synths at their most decadently new wavy. The effect is often spectacular." Lorraine Ali of the Los Angeles Times commented "songs swagger with lipstick-wearing attitude, have fun with sleazy subject matter and actually convey some (gasp) human emotion [...] This album is the first time we actually experience Manson as a band, not a phenomenon filtered through Reznor's mixing board wizardry or a freak show accompanied by a soundtrack. An album that's powerful from start to finish is far more surprising than any controversial Manson high jinks [...] this record ensures his further infiltration of teenage America and earns him a new spot in the annals of great, big, pompous pop albums." David Browne describes that the sound of the album "is often spectacular: a lurid cabaret-rock revue for the post-global-economy meltdown." According to NME, Mechanical Animals "marks a total shift in Manson's assault. Where the Antichrist Superstar game plan was about gaining notoriety through outrage, rather than winning souls over on musical grounds, Mechanical Animals aims straight for the singalong heart of stadium-land. And rips it out, and holds it aloft in triumph [...] Of the 14 tracks here, ten could be singles. On this evidence alone, 'Mechanical Animals' is an unashamedly crass bid for total world domination [...] they already have the goth kids. Now, their sights have turned on everyone else."

However, not everyone gave the album a positive review. Music critic Robert Christgau criticized "the feebleness of La Manson's vocal affect" and dismissed the album as a whole as "one more depersonalizing production device with which to flatten willing cerebella whilst confronting humankind's alienation, amorality, and failure to have a good time on Saturday night." He concluded that "not every icon deserves a think piece." Spin magazine noted the record is "essentially mining the same agitprop territory and 'premillennial' confusion that hipster, highbrow heroes such as Alec Empire and Tricky take for granted. Manson shares with Empire a preference for destroying the master's house with the master's tools. Like Tricky, Manson uses gender confusion as a coping mechanism, less identity politics than identity evasion."

Joshua Klein of The A.V. Club was unconvinced with the sudden musical shift by the band and pointed out that neither will longtime fans. However, he conceded that the album is "more musical than anything Manson has done [...] His music packs both industrial muscle and anthemic conviction, even as it playfully steals from the Bowie songbook" while lamenting that thematically the album played it safe, with lyrics lacking, "any sense of wit, as songs doggedly hammer at safe taboos like drugs, sex, drugs, stardom, drugs, and death. And drugs." Like NME, Klein concluded the record will, nevertheless, help the band pick up new fans. Stephen Thomas Erlewine of AllMusic described the record as "a big, clean rock record" and praised it as a "welcome change of pace" and "more tuneful than his clattering industrial cacophony." However, he also noted that devoid of "the cartoonish menace that distinguished his prior music [...] Marilyn Manson seems a little ordinary [...] Manson should have remembered—demons are never that scary in the light." Despite this, Greg Burk of LA Weekly went on to call Mechanical Animals "one of the greatest albums of its decade."

=== Accolades ===
Spin ranked Mechanical Animals the seventh best album on their 1998 End of Year List. Online music magazine Addicted to Noise ranked Mechanical Animals 25th in their 1998 list of the "Albums of the Year". The Village Voice ranked Mechanical Animals 40th in their 1998 list of the "Albums of the Year". Kerrang! ranked Mechanical Animals second on their 1998 list of the Albums of the Year. Q magazine listed Mechanical Animals among their picks for their 1998 Recordings of the Year list. Dutch magazine Muziekkrant OOR ranked Mechanical Animals 18th in their 1998 Albums of the Year list. The record ranked second in the Critics Top 50 and 10th in the Popular Poll of German magazine Musik Express/Sounds in their 1998 "Albums of the Year" list. In 1999, American music journalist Ned Raggett listed Mechanical Animals 78th in his "The Top 136 Albums of the Nineties". Also in 1999, Australian magazine JUICE ranked Mechanical Animals 84th in their 100 Greatest Albums of the '90s. In 2006, sister British magazines Classic Rock and Metal Hammer included Mechanical Animals in The 200 Greatest Albums of the 90s. Also in 2006, Dutch public radio broadcaster VPRO included Mechanical Animals in their 299 Nominations of the Best Album of All Time. The French edition of the British magazine Rock Sound ranked Mechanical Animals 56th in their Top 150 Albums of Our Lifetime (1992–2006) and second in their 1998 Albums of the Year.

In the November 2003 issue of Blender magazine, author Chuck Palahniuk included the album in a list of his favourites, and said: "I met Marilyn Manson on a magazine assignment, and he wanted my advice on a novel he's writing. We drank absinthe once. I'll probably go to his show when he's in town next week. It's so fascinating to see somebody exorcise his demons in such a public way."

== Commercial performance ==
I showed the world more of myself and my emotions for the first time, and it left me now with a bitter feeling that I gave away something that [people] didn't appreciate or understand ... I did something I normally wouldn't do. It's out of character for me to expose so many nerves.

— Marilyn Manson

In the United States, Mechanical Animals debuted at number one on the Billboard 200 with first-week sales of 223,000 units, becoming the band's first number-one album on the chart. Propelled by both the first single's heavy rotation on the radio and on MTV as well as the band's main show performance at the 1998 MTV Video Music Awards, the record briefly displaced The Miseducation of Lauryn Hill for the number-one position on the Billboard 200. The following week, the album dropped to number five with 98,200 copies sold. The album also debuted at number one on the Canadian Albums Chart, selling 26,600 units in its first week in Canada.

Although critically acclaimed, Mechanical Animals was initially not too well received by longtime fans who complained about the wilfully radio-friendly sound of the album and surmised that Marilyn Manson had "sold out". It was certified platinum by the Recording Industry Association of America on February 25, 1999, but was the lowest-selling number-one album of 1998 in the United States. Producer Beinhorn said: "When Mechanical Animals came out, the projected sales figure for the first week was 300,000 copies. [The label was] excited, saying, 'We're going to hit No.1 and sell 300k!'. It sold 230,000 and got to No.1, but it wasn't enough. The label lost interest, they took down the huge billboard they had in Times Square for the album, the president of the label called Manson up, screaming at him for having tits on the cover. I think that, and what happened at Columbine, which really affected him emotionally, meant that he never made an album up to the standard of Mechanical Animals or Antichrist Superstar again. He just didn't get the support." As of November 2010, Mechanical Animals sold 1,409,000 copies in the US.

== Track listing ==
=== CD version ===
All lyrics are written by Marilyn Manson.

No.	Title	Music	Length
1.	"Great Big White World"	Twiggy Ramirez; Madonna Wayne Gacy; Zim Zum	5:01
2.	"The Dope Show"	Ramirez	3:46
3.	"Mechanical Animals"	Ramirez; Zum	4:33
4.	"Rock Is Dead"	Ramirez; Gacy	3:09
5.	"Disassociative"	Ramirez; Gacy; Zum	4:50
6.	"The Speed of Pain"	Ramirez; Gacy; Zum	5:30
7.	"Posthuman"	Ramirez; Gacy	4:17
8.	"I Want to Disappear"	Ramirez	2:56
9.	"I Don't Like the Drugs (But the Drugs Like Me)"	Ramirez; Zum	5:03
10.	"New Model No. 15"	Ramirez; Manson	3:40
11.	"User Friendly"	Ramirez; Gacy; Zum	4:17
12.	"Fundamentally Loathsome"	Gacy; Zum	4:49
13.	"The Last Day on Earth"	Manson; Gacy; Ramirez	5:01
14.	"Coma White"	Ramirez; Gacy; Zum	5:38
Total length:			62:37

=== Hidden multimedia track ===
No.	Title	Music	Length
1.	Untitled	Gacy	1:22
Total length:			63:59

Notes

- Australian and Korean releases of the album come with an additional DVD that contains the music videos for "The Beautiful People", "The Dope Show", and "Sweet Dreams".
- This album features a hidden track, playable only on a computer; it is untitled and experimental, further playing on the album's theme of the character Omēga and conformity. Upon entering the album into a computer, an autorun file starts a program that displays two of Manson's paintings while the song plays in the background. It is thought to be an experiment in synesthesia.

=== Vinyl version ===
When released on vinyl, the record was split into two separately sleeved albums; the first credited to the character of Alpha (portrayed by Manson himself), pressed on opaque white vinyl, and the latter to Omēga and the Mechanical Animals on transparent blue vinyl. The Manson album dealt with songs of love and alienation, while the Mechanical Animals disc contained anthems of sex and drug use. The vinyl edition was reissued in 2012, but on black vinyl instead of white and blue. The track listing, however, remains the same.

Marilyn Manson: Side one
No.	Title	Length
1.	"Great Big White World"	5:01
2.	"Posthuman"	4:04
3.	"The Speed of Pain"	5:30
4.	"The Last Day on Earth"	5:05
Total length:		19:57

Marilyn Manson: Side two
No.	Title	Length
1.	"Disassociative"	4:50
2.	"Mechanical Animals"	4:39
3.	"Coma White"	5:38
Total length:		15:16

Omēga and the Mechanical Animals: Side one
No.	Title	Length
1.	"The Dope Show"	3:46
2.	"Rock Is Dead"	3:10
3.	"I Want to Disappear"	3:09
4.	"Fundamentally Loathsome"	4:49
Total length:		15:02

Omēga and the Mechanical Animals: Side two
No.	Title	Length
1.	"I Don't Like the Drugs (But the Drugs Like Me)"	5:03
2.	"New Model No. 15"	3:39
3.	"User Friendly"	4:18
Total length:		13:10

Note

- Song length differs from CD version as tracks are not cross faded and appear in full length form with one- to two-second gaps between songs. Additionally, the intro to "I Want to Disappear" is tracked as the final 15 seconds of "Posthuman" on the CD while it appears as part of "I Want to Disappear" on the vinyl version.

== Personnel ==
Credits adapted from the liner notes of Mechanical Animals.

=== Marilyn Manson ===
- Marilyn Manson – vocals, vocoder (6, 13), electric drums and syncussion (2), synthesizer (6), guitars (13), piano (14), photography, production
- Zim Zum – guitars (1, 3, 5–7, 9–12, 14), synth-guitar (6), composer
- Twiggy Ramirez – bass (1–12, 14), guitars (1–11, 13, 14), synth-bass (10), noises (11), composer
- Ginger Fish – drums (1, 3–13), electric drums (5)
- Madonna Wayne Gacy – keyboards (1, 3–7, 9–14), piano (2, 3, 11, 12), mellotron (6, 14), shaker (6), electric percussion (7), sampler (8), synth-bass (13), electric drums (14)

=== Additional musicians ===
- Dave Navarro – guitars on "I Don't Like the Drugs (But the Drugs Like Me)"
- Danny Saber – keyboards, clavinet, strings, programming
- Rose McGowan – vocals on "Posthuman"
- Alexandra Brown – background vocals on "I Don't Like the Drugs (But the Drugs Like Me)"
- Lynn Davis – background vocals on "I Don't Like the Drugs (But the Drugs Like Me)"
- Kobe Tai – background vocals on "New Model No. 15"
- Dyanna Lauren – "pornography" on "User Friendly"
- Neil Strauss – scratching on "User Friendly"
- John West – background vocals on "I Don't Like the Drugs (But the Drugs Like Me)"

=== Production ===
- Michael Beinhorn – production
- Sean Beavan – additional production, engineering, programming, digital editing
- Barry Goldberg – engineering
- Tom Lord-Alge – mixing
- Joseph Cultice – photography
- Ted Jensen – mastering

== Charts ==
=== Weekly charts ===
Chart (1998–2025)	Peak position
Australian Albums (ARIA)	1
Austrian Albums (Ö3 Austria)	6
Belgian Albums (Ultratop Flanders)	22
Belgian Albums (Ultratop Wallonia)	45
Canadian Albums (Billboard)	1
Dutch Albums (Album Top 100)	42
European Albums (Music & Media)	5
Finnish Albums (Suomen virallinen lista)	6
French Albums (SNEP)	14
German Albums (Offizielle Top 100)	7
Greek Albums (IFPI)	58
Italian Albums (FIMI)	5
Japanese Albums (Oricon)	25
New Zealand Albums (RMNZ)	3
Norwegian Albums (VG-lista)	3
Portuguese Albums (AFP)	4
Scottish Albums (Official Charts)	17
Spanish Albums (AFYVE)	8
Swedish Albums (Sverigetopplistan)	6
Swiss Albums (Schweizer Hitparade)	44
UK Albums (Official Charts)	8
US Billboard 200	1

Chart (2025)	Peak position
Greek Albums (IFPI)	58

=== Year-end charts ===
Chart (1998)	Position
Australian Albums (ARIA)	76
Canada Top Albums/CDs (RPM)	74
European Albums (Music & Media)	88
New Zealand Albums (RMNZ)	49
US Billboard 200	119

Chart (1999)	Position
US Billboard 200	198

== Certifications ==
Region	Certification	Certified units/sales
Australia (ARIA)	Gold	35,000^{^}
Canada (Music Canada)	Platinum	100,000^{^}
Japan (RIAJ)	Gold	100,000^{^}
New Zealand (RMNZ)	Platinum	15,000^{^}
Spain (Promusicae)	Gold	50,000^{^}
Sweden (GLF)	Gold	40,000^{^}
United Kingdom (BPI)	Gold	100,000^{^}
United States (RIAA)	Platinum	1,409,000
^{^} Shipments figures based on certification alone.

== See also ==
- List of Billboard 200 number-one albums of 1998
- List of number-one albums of 1998 (Australia)
- List of number-one albums of 1998 (Canada)
