= Waterlaso =

Waterlaso is a rock music group from Sedona, Arizona.

Michael Cameron, singer and songwriter for Waterlaso, started recording music in the mid-90s in his bedroom. At the time he played with several Northern Arizona bands, the most popular of which being There Goes Atlantis, who performed alongside notable cult musician Jack Logan and Swedish pop favorites Salt.

Between 1994 and 1999 Cameron recorded and released 8 albums on cassette 4-track, and played a major part in Arizona's low-fi recording scene during that era. After There Goes Atlantis disbanded, Cameron relocated to Phoenix and recorded Waterlaso's ground-breaking 2001 release "What Have You Ever Done To Deserve Everything You've Ever Wanted" making several 10 Best lists for that year.

Currently living in Los Angeles, he's now working with Keith Krey (Drums), Nick Cullen (Guitar, Bass) and Padra Moinian (Synth). Waterlaso has most recently released "Wild" on Mountain Fighting for which they enlisted one of the most influential producers in indie music Mark Kramer to put the finishing touches on the record. He has worked with Galaxie 500, Ween and produced Urge Overkill who covered "Girl You'll Be A Woman Soon" for the Pulp Fiction soundtrack. Waterlaso has had music featured in the films "American Standard" and "The Matter With Clark."

== Instrumentation ==
- Michael Cameron (Guitar, Vocals, Programming)
- Padra Moinian (Keyboards, Vocals)
- Keith Krey (Drums, Vocals)
- Nick Cullen (Guitar, Bass, Vocals)

== Discography ==
- What Have You Ever Done To Deserve Everything You've Ever Wanted (2001) LP CD
- The Out Of Africa Sunset EP (2004)
- Made Crooked: By Mountain Fighting (2006) CD
- Wild (2010) CD LP
- Disaffected Single Digital Only (2011)
