= Baxter (1998 album) =

Studio album by Baxter
- Released: September 15, 1998
- Recorded: 1997
- Genre: Trip hop
- Length: 48:18
- Labels: Maverick/Warner Bros. Records; 46986
- Producer: Baxter

Baxter chronology
Baxter (1998)	About This (2002)

Professional ratings
Review scores
Source	Rating
AllMusic	link
Melody Maker	1.5/5 stars

Baxter is a studio album released by Swedish electronica band Baxter on September 15, 1998 (see 1998 in music). This is the debut album by the band and was released on Warner Bros. Records through its subsidiary Maverick Records. It was recorded in the early months of 1997 and is self produced.

== Track listing ==
- All songs composed by Ricky Tillblad, Carl Herlofsson, and Nina Ramsby as Baxter.
1. Television – 4:41
2. Fading – 5:52
3. Love Again – 3:41
4. I Can’t See Why – 4:53
5. Ballad of Behaviour – 4:43
6. Political – 6:34
7. Possible – 3:48
8. All of My Pride – 4:39
9. So Much I’ve Heard – 4:35
10. Oh My Love – 4:55
11. + I Can't See Why (Yoga Remix) – 7:00
12. + I Can't See Why (Baxter Remix) - 6:22
13. + I Can't See Why (Skylab Remix) - 5:28

+ Japan only release.

== Personnel ==
- Ricky Tillblad – programming, bassline, lyrics, rhythm, final mix
- Carl Herlofsson – programming, string arrangements, mixing, trumpet, melody, rhythm, final mix
- Nina Ramsby – lead vocals, guitar, melodica, melody, lyrics, string arrangements, final mix
- Björn Engelmann Cutting Room Studios – mastering
