= Marilyn Manson–Columbine High School massacre controversy =

1990s controversy in the US

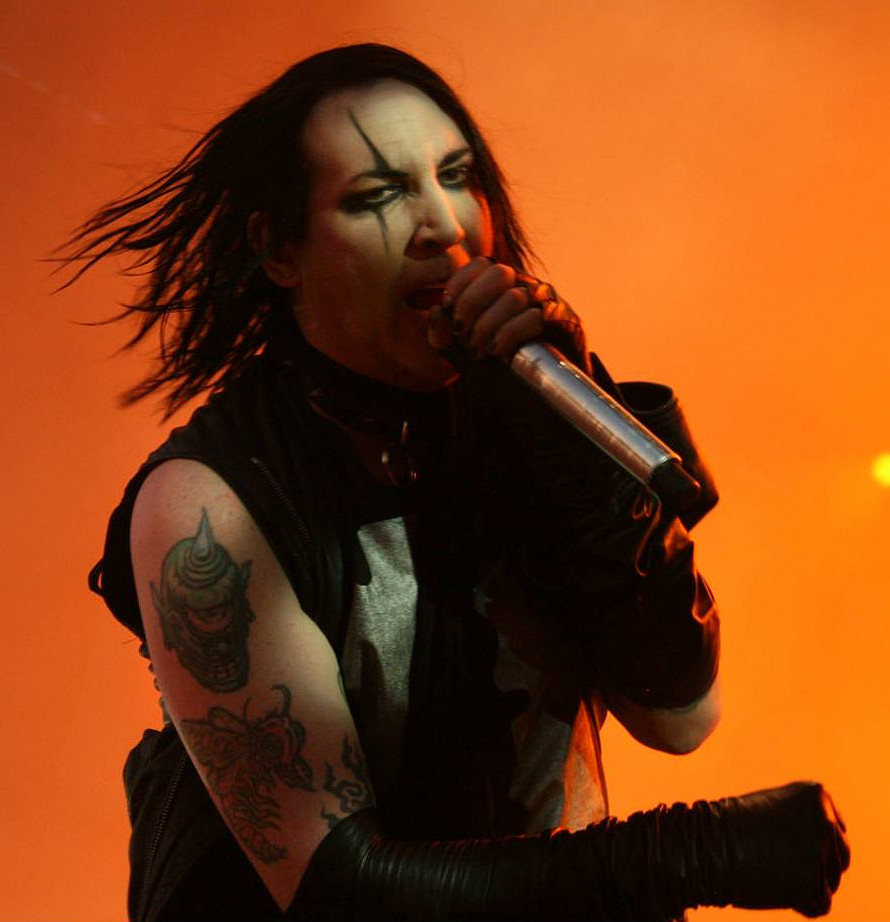
Rock musician Marilyn Manson (left) was linked to the Columbine High School massacre (right) in the aftermath of the tragedy.

Following the massacre at Columbine High School on April 20, 1999, one common view was that the violent actions perpetrated by the two shooters, Eric Harris and Dylan Klebold, were due to violent influences in entertainment, specifically those in the music of Marilyn Manson.

== Background ==
In music, there is Marilyn Manson, an individual who chooses the name of a mass murderer as part of his name. The lyrics of his music are consistent with his choice of name. They are violent and nihilistic, and there are groups all over the world who do this, some German groups and others. I guess what I am saying is, a person already troubled in this modern high-tech world can be in their car and hear the music, they can be in their room and see the video, they can go into the chat rooms and act out these video games and even take it to real life. Something there is very much of a problem.

— Chairman of the Senate Judiciary Committee Subcommittee on Youth Violence Senator Jeff Sessions testifying before the Senate on the Columbine tragedy, 1999.

In the late 1990s, Marilyn Manson and his eponymous band established themselves as a household name, and as one of the most controversial rock acts in music history. Their albums Antichrist Superstar (1996) and Mechanical Animals (1998) were both critical and commercial successes, and by the time of their Rock Is Dead Tour in 1999, the frontman had become a culture war iconoclast and a rallying icon for alienated youth. As their popularity increased, the confrontational nature of the group's music and imagery outraged social conservatives. Numerous politicians lobbied to have their performances banned, citing false and exaggerated claims that they contained animal sacrifices, bestiality and rape. Their concerts were routinely picketed by religious advocates and parent groups, who asserted that their music had a corrupting influence on youth culture by inciting "rape, murder, blasphemy and suicide".

On April 20, 1999, Columbine High School seniors Eric Harris and Dylan Klebold shot dead 13 students and a teacher and wounded 23 others, before committing suicide. Immediately after the massacre, significant blame was directed at the band and, specifically, at its outspoken frontman. In the weeks following the shootings, media reports about Harris and Klebold portrayed them and the Trench Coat Mafia as part of a gothic cult. Early media reports alleged that the shooters were fans, and were wearing the group's T-shirts during the massacre. Although these claims were later proven to be false, news outlets continued to run sensationalist stories with headlines such as "Killers Worshipped Rock Freak Manson" and "Devil-Worshipping Maniac Told Kids To Kill." Speculation in national media and among the public led many to believe that Manson's music and imagery were the shooter's sole motivation, despite reports that revealed that the two were not fans—and, on the contrary, "had nothing but contempt for the music".

I think there's something going on that you can't see from the outside ... his whole thing is part of a drug-cultural type of thing, with a subculture of violence and killing and hatred, and anti-family values, anti-traditional values, anti-authority ... We're having an alarming rate of killings in schools, and youth violence and an increase in drugs. I would say that though they're not all to be blamed on a shock entertainer like Marilyn Manson, I think he promotes it and can be part of the blame.

— Michigan State Senator Dale Shugars' concerns on the influence of Marilyn Manson on concert-goers.

Despite this, Marilyn Manson were widely criticized by religious, political, and entertainment-industry figures. A day after the shooting, Michigan State Senator Dale Shugars attended the band's concert, along with policy advisers, a local police officer and the state senate's sergeant-at-arms, at the Van Andel Arena in Grand Rapids, Michigan to conduct research for a proposed bill requiring parental warnings on concert tickets and promotional material for any performer that had released a record bearing the Parental Advisory sticker in the last five years. According to Shugars, the show began with the singer wearing "satanic wings" as he leapt from a cross that was eventually set on fire. He then described seeing fans, whom he described as normal kids, "under [Manson's] control" as he performed a sequence that "glorified the killing of a police officer." Finally, he reported the singer recounting a dream sequence in which cops perform sex acts on him before Jesus Christ descended out of a sky made of LSD and told him the real name of God is "Drugs." After which, the band launched into "I Don't Like the Drugs (But the Drugs Like Me)". Shugars expressed concern that these shows had adverse effects on concert-goers.

Under mounting pressure in the days after Columbine, the group postponed their last five North American tour dates out of respect for the victims and their families. Subsequently, the band canceled the remaining dates of the tour out of respect for the victims, explaining, "It's not a great atmosphere to be out playing rock 'n' roll shows, for us or the fans." However, Manson steadfastly maintained that music, movies, books or video games are not to blame, stating,

The [news] media has unfairly scapegoated the music industry and so-called Goth kids and has speculated, with no basis in truth, that artists like myself are in some way to blame. This tragedy was a product of ignorance, hatred and an access to guns. I hope the [news] media's irresponsible finger-pointing doesn't create more discrimination against kids who look different.

On April 29, ten US senators (led by Sam Brownback of Kansas) sent a letter to Edgar Bronfman Jr. – the president of Seagram (the owner of Interscope) – requesting a voluntary halt to his company's distribution to children of "music that glorifies violence". The letter named Marilyn Manson for producing songs which "eerily reflect" the actions of Harris and Klebold. The signatories included eight Republicans and two Democrats namely, US Senators Wayne Allard, Ben Nighthorse Campbell, Susan Collins, Tim Hutchinson, Rick Santorum, Kent Conrad, Byron Dorgan, John Ashcroft and Jeff Sessions. Later that day, the band cancelled their remaining North American shows. Two days later, Manson published his response to these accusations in an op-ed piece for Rolling Stone, titled "Columbine: Whose Fault Is It?", where he castigated America's gun culture, the political influence of the National Rifle Association, and the media's irresponsible coverage, which he said facilitated the placing of blame on a scapegoat, instead of debating more relevant societal issues.

On May 4, a hearing on the marketing and distribution of violent content to minors by the television, music, film and video-game industries was held by the United States Senate Committee on Commerce, Science and Transportation. The committee heard testimony from the former Secretary of Education (and co-founder of conservative violent entertainment watchdog group Empower America) William Bennett, the Archbishop of Denver Charles J. Chaput, professors and mental-health professionals. Speakers criticized the band, its label-mate Nine Inch Nails, and the 1999 film The Matrix for their alleged contribution to a cultural environment enabling violence such as the Columbine shootings. The committee requested that the Federal Trade Commission and the United States Department of Justice investigate the entertainment industry's marketing practices to minors.

After concluding the European and Japanese legs of their tour on August 8, the band withdrew from public view.

Those taking a stance against Manson claimed that his rock group was perhaps the sickest group ever promoted by a mainstream record company. Michael Moore, in his documentary film Bowling for Columbine, states that, shortly after the attack, it seemed that the entire focus was that the two killers were motivated to commit their act as a result of listening to Marilyn Manson.

Two years after Columbine, Manson was expected to perform in Denver, Colorado, at the Ozzfest at Mile High Stadium. As a result, protesters gathered to prevent Manson from performing. One speaker said that Marilyn Manson's music promoted what he called Columbine-like behavior, such as hate, violence, death, suicide, and drug use. The protesters were largely made up of the Citizens for Peace and Respect, an organization that consisted of locals, churches, and Columbine families.

== Marilyn Manson's response ==
He or she or whatever the case might be realizes that he can be tremendously booed and that his work is tremendously offensive.

— US Senator Orrin Hatch's conjecture on why the band decided to abandon the rest of their US tour.

Though Manson initially refused to appear on news stations and talk shows, and he cancelled several shows out of respect for the victims of Columbine, he later spoke out in many different interviews. One such notable interview was on the August 20, 2001 episode of The O'Reilly Factor, where Manson once again denied that the band's music was responsible for Columbine. Bill O'Reilly pointed out Manson's controversial behavior, such as committing a sexual act with another male live on stage. In response, Manson claimed that this was not planned and was entertaining at the time. O'Reilly also challenged Manson by stating that never before in the United States had there been more corrupting influences on the nation's youth at one time, and that while Manson claims that his messages are not meant to be taken a certain way, young people can misinterpret his lyrics. O'Reilly also argued that "disturbed kids" without direction from responsible parents could misinterpret the message of his music as endorsing the belief that "when I'm dead [then] everybody's going to know me." Manson responded:

Well, I think that's a very valid point and I think that it's a reflection of, not necessarily this program but of television in general, that if you die and enough people are watching you become a martyr, you become a hero, you become well known. So when you have these things like Columbine, and you have these kids who are angry and they have something to say and no one's listening, the media sends a message that says if you do something loud enough and it gets our attention then you will be famous for it. Those kids ended up on the cover of Time magazine twice, the media gave them exactly what they wanted. That's why I never did any interviews around that time when I was being blamed for it because I didn't want to contribute to something that I found to be reprehensible.

Manson also told O'Reilly that his lyrics do not promote suicide but that they encourage "getting through feelings like that." In interviews, Manson claimed that he does not promote violence, hate, suicide, and the other atrocities of which he has been accused. Rather, he promotes not being afraid to be different and to challenge societal views and norms. He repeatedly asserts that there is a difference between art and real life.

=== Return to Denver ===
The Ozzfest leg of the tour marked the band's first performance in Denver, Colorado (on June 22, 2001 at Mile High Stadium) after the Columbine High School massacre in Littleton. After initially canceling due to a scheduling conflict, the band changed their plans to play the Denver date. The group's decision met resistance from conservative groups; Manson received death threats and demands to cancel the band's performance. A group of church leaders, businesses and families related to Columbine formed an ad hoc organization opposing the show. Citizens for Peace and Respect, which was supported by Colorado governor Bill Owens and representative Tom Tancredo, claimed on their website that the band "promotes hate, violence, death, suicide, drug use, and the attitudes and actions of the Columbine killers". In response, a group of Marilyn Manson supporters formed the Citizens for the Protection of the Right to Free Speech to support the concert. One spokesman for a Columbine victim's family told reporters that Manson shouldn't be expected to instill values in children and that he should be welcomed to Ozzfest. In response, Manson issued a statement:

I am truly amazed that after all this time, religious groups still need to attack entertainment and use these tragedies as a pitiful excuse for their own self-serving publicity. In response to their protests, I will provide a show where I balance my songs with a wholesome Bible reading. This way, fans will not only hear my so-called, 'violent' point of view, but we can also examine the virtues of wonderful 'Christian' stories of disease, murder, adultery, suicide and child sacrifice. Now that seems like 'entertainment' to me.

During the Denver show, Manson also appeared in an interview for Michael Moore's 2002 documentary, Bowling for Columbine. In the interview, Manson and Moore discussed the irony that on the day of the shooting, the United States dropped more bombs on Serbian forces in Kosovo than any other time during the Kosovo War. Manson argued that then US president Bill Clinton had more influence than himself, yet no one questioned whether the president was to blame. When Moore asked Manson what he would have said "If you were to talk directly to the kids at Columbine, the people in the community, what would you say to them if they were here right now?", he replied, "I wouldn't say a single word to them. I would listen to what they have to say and that's what no one did."

== Effects on Marilyn Manson's career ==
I would just get on stage and smash beer bottles and cut myself and go, "Fuck you, bring it" [...] I would jump into the crowd and punch people. It wasn’t even those people who were at fault. But my dad gave me the best advice: "If people are going to kill you, son, they wouldn’t tell you in advance." No, I don’t miss that at all. It made everyone around me upset.

— Marilyn Manson, recounting the Guns, God and Government Tour in 2017.

In an interview, Manson said that being blamed for Columbine nearly ruined his career. He claimed that he had to pursue legal action against those who were so avidly associating his name with the Columbine shooting. He says that he has been blamed for more school shootings than any musical artist in history.

Shortly after the Columbine incident, Manson released a new video for "The Fight Song" off the band's album Holy Wood (In the Shadow of the Valley of Death). Many assumed that it referenced the Columbine massacre by depicting a clash between jocks and goths. Manson denied that there was a connection.

In a 2012 interview, Manson revealed that the album Born Villain, which would be released that year, was named partially due to his blame for the Columbine shooting. He said that the title is perfect because he became vilified by society.

== See also ==
- Moral panic
- Scapegoating
- Folk devil
