= Auscultate (album) =

Studio album by Salt
- Released: 1995
- Genre: Alternative rock
- Label: MVG; Island

Salt chronology
| Bluster EP (1995) | Auscultate (1995) | Delay Me Down and Make Me Wah-Wah (1997) |

Auscultate is the debut album by the Swedish band Salt. Island Records released the album in the United States in 1996.

The first single from the album was "Bluster", which was a modern rock radio hit. The band supported the album by touring with Local H.

== Production ==
Singer Nino Ramsby wrote and sang in English, as he felt it was a more tuneful and more cryptic language. He double tracked his vocals and guitar parts. All of the songs are about personal relationships.

== Critical reception ==
Professional ratings
Review scores
| Source | Rating |
|---|---|
| AllMusic | 4/5 stars |
| The Evening Post | 5/5 stars |
| The Guardian | 2/5 stars |
| Knoxville News Sentinel | 4/5 stars |
| Los Angeles Times | 3/4 stars |
| Pitchfork | 8.2/10 |

Trouser Press wrote that Ramsby "is a controlled, forceful singer with no perceptible accent, a complicated persona (the sketchy lyrics say a lot) and emotion to burn." Spin thought that, "on 'Bluster', metal riffing pile-drives into flowing-pop choruses, while on 'So', doleful acoustic guitars buffet broken rhythms." The Los Angeles Times deemed the album "jagged, volatile songs with just enough of an arty edge to add intrigue." The Chicago Tribune opined that Salt "cobbles together skewed tunes with prickly, saw-toothed riffs, tuneful pop melodies and agitated power chords."

The Knoxville News Sentinel determined that Salt "embodies the vitriol typical of progressive music's more contentious woman-led bands... But Ramsby, backed by bassist Daniel Ewerman and drummer Jim Tegman, also reveals a subtlety not often heard from the likes of Hole." The Evening Post called the band a "trio of brutal power and uncommon melodic ability," writing: "Driven hard by a muscle-packed rhythm section, the band tempers tough cred with some deft off-centre flourishes, most of them courtesy of Ramsby's slacker-goddess vocals and her gender-bending stiff-arm guitar playing." The Guardian opined that "ringing choruses help a bit—the mantric repetition of 'You punish me as a boy' on 'Honour Me' is a beaut—but there's nothing here to distinguish them from the competition."

== Track listing ==
| No. | Title | Length |
|---|---|---|
| 1. | "Impro" |
| 2. | "Honour Me" |
| 3. | "Beauty" |
| 4. | "God Damn Carneval" |
| 5. | "Obsession" |
| 6. | "Bluster" |
| 7. | "Lids" |
| 8. | "So" |
| 9. | "Witty" |
| 10. | "So I Ached" |
| 11. | "Flutter" |
| 12. | "Sense" |
| 13. | "Undressed" |
