= Joseph Cultice =

American photographer

- Occupation: Photographer Film director
- Agent: Seven Artist Management
- Known for: Mechanical Animals
- Website: www.josephcultice.com

Joseph Cultice is an American photographer.

Cultice began his photography career in Phoenix, Arizona, where he was inspired by his love of rock 'n' roll and pop icons like Kiss and David Bowie. His first photo shoot was with rock band The Meat Puppets.

He moved to New York City in 1990.

Cultice's fashion work has been singled out by the annual 2001 Art Director's Young Guns exhibit, featuring one of his most recent stories. Cultice has also worked with shock rocker, Marilyn Manson on numerous accounts directing both the Marilyn Manson documentary, Dead to the World (1998) as well as the music video for Manson's contribution to David Lynch's film, Lost Highway (1997), "Apple of Sodom". Apart from his video work with Manson, He is also credited with both creating and photographing the cover art on Manson's third full-length studio album, Mechanical Animals (1998).

== Clients ==
Cultice's first big break came with Nine Inch Nails whom Cultice photographed throughout their most iconic era The Downward Spiral and associated tour season. He has also shot for artists including N'SYNC, Björk, Moby, Nine Inch Nails, Destiny's Child, Macy Gray, Garbage, Boy George, Patti Smith, Beck, Basement Jaxx, Kill Hannah, Korn, Type O Negative and Gary Numan.

Cultice is a regular contributor to Vogue magazine and Entertainment Weekly. Other sittings include Chloë Sevigny, Heather Graham, Gillian Anderson, Molly Ringwald, Greg Kinnear and the cast of Survivor.
