= Jazzen =

Studio album by Nina Ramsby and Martin Hederos
- Released: October 16, 2006
- Genre: Jazz
- Length: 45:48
- Label: Amigo Musik
- Producer: Nina Ramsby; Martin Hederos

Nina Ramsby and Martin Hederos chronology
Visorna (2004)	Jazzen (2006)

Jazzen is a studio album by Swedish musicians Nina Ramsby and Martin Hederos, released 16 October 2006 on Amigo Musik. It is the second collaboration by the duo (Visorna was released in 2004). The album consists of English-language jazz standards, translated into Swedish by Ramsby, as well as new compositions by Hederos and Ramsby. Tracks include Swedish versions of "I Got It Bad (and That Ain't Good)" by Duke Ellington, "Open the Door" by Betty Carter and "Lover Man" by Jimmy Davis, Roger Ramirez and Jimmy Sherman.

The album reached No. 36 on the Swedish Sverigetopplistan albums chart.

== Track listing ==
All lyrics are written by Nina Ramsby

No.	Title	Writer(s)	Length
1.	"Och nu gör ingenting ont" ("It's Only Love That Gets You Through")	Helen Folasade Adu, Janusz Podrazik	3:36
2.	"Det är inte så nu" ("I Got It Bad (and That Ain't Good)")	Duke Ellington, Paul Francis Webster	5:40
3.	"Jag har en vän"	Martin Hederos, Nina Ramsby	4:34
4.	"Stänger min dörr" ("Open the Door")	Betty Carter	4:23
5.	"Du min vän" ("Little Star")	Stina Nordenstam	5:34
6.	"När ingen visste" ("Harry's Theme Part 1")	Jan Tolf, Ramsby	4:10
7.	"Kanske jag kommer hem" ("Poem for #15")	Steve Kuhn	2:55
8.	"Hon går nu" ("Empty Hearts")	Michael McDonald	4:54
9.	"Alla som jag glömmer" ("Lover Man (Oh, Where Can You Be?)")	James Davis, Roger Ramirez, Jimmy Sherman	4:56
10.	"I sin storhet" ("Compassion/Compensation")	Nina Simone, Sly Dunbar	3:16
11.	"Kvartetten gör't"	Hederos	1:42
Total length:			45:48
