= Baxter (electronica band) =

Swedish electronic band

Baxter is a Swedish electronica band composed of two drum and bass producers and an emotive vocalist. The band set out to transform pop music by introducing melody, vocals and strong song-writing to a layered drum and bass/jungle-influenced rhythm.

== Formation ==
In 1996, Ricky Tillblad, one of the Swedish recording industry's pre-eminent designers, dub/reggae aficionado, and the man behind the Stockholm dub club, DubDeck, met Nino Ramsby, former guitarist and lead singer in the band Salt. At the time, Nino was looking for design and graphic arts work to finance his musical interests. He began working at Ricky's design firm, F+. The two began writing music together and that same year, Ricky bumped into Carl Herlöfsson, guítar player /engineer/ producer and head of the Indie label Primal Music, at his club. The chance meeting resulted in Ricky signing on as partner in Carl's label. By late 1996, Ricky and Carl had become a prolific production team working as Eclectic Bob, cutting instrumental club-oriented drum & bass tracks for Primal Music.

One day, Nino came into work at the studio and was introduced to Carl, bringing about the first time all three had been together. For the next three months, Ricky, Carl and Nino experimented with sound, wrote, and recorded most of an album. By the spring of 1997, all that was left to do was a bit of polishing and mixing on the tracks. In the fall of 1997, the three of them—as Baxter—sent out a five-track promotional CD comprising selections from their full-length album. After lengthy negotiations and numerous overseas flights Baxter signed with Maverick Records.

== Critical reception ==
Their debut album, Baxter, was rated 4 out of 5 stars by AllMusic.

== Members ==
- Ricky Tillblad – programming, bass-line, lyrics, rhythm, final mix.
- Carl Herlöfsson – programming, string arrangements, mixing, trumpet, melody, rhythm, final mix.
- Nino Ramsby – vocals, guitar, melodica, melody, lyrics, string re-arrangements, final mix.

== Discography ==
- Baxter (1998)
- About This (2002)
- Tell Me Like It Is (2010)
