= The Dope Show =

1998 single by Marilyn Manson

Single by Marilyn Manson

from the album Mechanical Animals
- Released: September 15, 1998
- Genre: Glam rock; alternative rock; glam metal
- Length: 3:47
- Label: Nothing; Interscope
- Songwriters: Marilyn Manson; Twiggy Ramirez
- Producers: Michael Beinhorn; Marilyn Manson; Sean Beavan (add. production)

Marilyn Manson singles chronology
"Tourniquet" (1997)	"The Dope Show" (1998)	"I Don't Like the Drugs (But the Drugs Like Me)" (1999)

Music video
- "The Dope Show" on YouTube

"The Dope Show" is a song by American rock band Marilyn Manson. It was released in September 1998 as the lead single from their third studio album Mechanical Animals. The lyrics were written by Marilyn Manson and the music composed by Twiggy Ramirez.

The song reached number 12 in the UK and the US Mainstream Rock charts. It was nominated for Best Hard Rock Performance at the 41st Annual Grammy Awards (1999) and it finished 18th on the 1998 Pazz & Jop critics' singles poll.

== Background ==
"The Dope Show"
Album version of "The Dope Show"

After the release of Antichrist Superstar (1996), an album which sparked controversy among Christian fundamentalists, Marilyn Manson did not want to resume playing the role of a bogeyman. He feared that this would cause him to be "consigned to the one-note rock theatricality" of Kiss and Alice Cooper. He desired to convince casual rock and pop fans who had previously dismissed him that he was "more than a cartoon". For his next album, Mechanical Animals (1998), he took inspiration from the glam rock music that David Bowie made in the 1970s, and adopted a wardrobe and hairstyle similar to Bowie's.

The album contained numerous references to drugs, which Manson said were inspired by the work of writers like William S. Burroughs and Philip K. Dick. Manson explained: "I advocate the use of drugs, but have always looked down on the abuse of drugs. The people who misuse them give the rest of us a bad name, and I'm not only talking about street drugs. There are a lot of references in the album to the prescripted lifestyle that a lot people have followed and numbed out their emotions and become mechanical." "The Dope Show" was envisioned by Manson as "'We Are the World' for drug addicts." However, Manson's guitarist, Twiggy Ramirez, described the track as a rip-off of the Iggy Pop song "Nightclubbing" (1977) that takes influence from the music of T. Rex and Oasis.

Three weeks prior to their official release, "The Dope Show" and the title track of Hole's Celebrity Skin were played on stations in New York City and Los Angeles. Shortly afterward, "The Dope Show" was leaked to the internet by a fan, with MTV News describing the leak as "near CD-quality".

== Music video ==
Marilyn Manson in the music video for "The Dope Show"

"The Dope Show"'s single release was accompanied by a surrealistic music video directed by Paul Hunter, which premiered on August 20, 1998. In scenes reminiscent of The Man Who Fell to Earth, Manson appears — red-haired, with his entire body, including prosthetic rubber breasts, covered in white latex paint — as an androgynous extraterrestrial wandering around the Hollywood Hills. He is captured, studied in a laboratory, and eventually transported by limousine to a stage where he and the other members of the band — the fictional band Omega and the Mechanical Animals — perform the song in concert before hysterical fans who end up rioting and crossing the security barriers. Actor Billy Zane makes a cameo appearance in the limo sequence, as a recording industry executive. This same sequence features parodies of Spin magazine (as "Spun" in the video) and The National Enquirer.

The video's imagery employs several direct homages to The Holy Mountain, most specifically a sequence involving the destruction of plaster casts of the main character's body in a crucifixion pose. In addition, sculptural pieces by German artist Rebecca Horn are re-created such as "Overflowing Blood Machine" in which Manson is bound by long, red, blood-flowing tubes. In the limo sequence, "Cornucopia" a construction which seems to join the mouth and breasts with a self-nursing effect.

The video won a MTV Video Music Award for "Best Cinematography", as well as the "Maximum Vision" award. It was filmed on standard cinema-grade Kodak 35 mm film stock; the contrast, saturation, and color tinting were all altered dramatically to obtain its vintage look. The video was filmed over two weeks — extreme in comparison to the industry standard of two days. Interscope Records funded the video, while HSI Productions produced and filmed it. Manson co-directed.

The "Hollywood Hills" scene with Manson walking outside was actually filmed in the city of Simi Valley in southern California. The building in the background is the House of the Book building at the Brandeis-Bardin Institute.

"The Dope Show"'s performance sequence was filmed in front of the Los Angeles Municipal Traffic Court Building. The Brutalist architecture did not permit a reasonable angle or height from which to film; instead, the band was placed on top of the trailer of an 18-wheeler transport truck. Cameras situated on mechanical arms, and at a distance across the street, were used to film the dramatic concert shots. These scenes are interspersed with cuts of underground transgender performer Goddess Bunny (aka Sandie Crisp) dancing in a yellow, sequined dress, similar to that worn by Twiggy Ramirez in the same video. The costumes for the video, including the dresses and Marilyn Manson's red, diamond-patterned boots (which featured a 6-inch sole and heel) were designed jointly by Manson and Terri King. The Goddess Bunny's custom couture sequin gown (worn for the video and the live MTV awards performance), was designed and hand sewn by Kris Hendrickson Testanier of San Francisco.

The video reached number 16 on MuchMusic's "50 Most Controversial Videos", for Manson's shocking appearance. The video is available on a DVD included with some editions of Lest We Forget, as well as on the VHS compilation God Is in the TV, which also included "uncensored" outtake footage, such as Twiggy Ramirez, Madonna Wayne Gacy and the Goddess Bunny undressing in the back of a limousine.

An alternate version of the video just featuring Manson and various close ups was released on the old Marilyn Manson website Marilyn Manson.net prior to the official release. Parts of this first video can be seen in the finished video.

== Reception ==
=== Critical reception ===
Barry Walters of The Village Voice commented "The Dope Show is the first Manson single as memorable as its video. Over a skipping Gary Glitter beat, the pied piper of gloom celebrates the Clinton-era narcotics of oral stimulation and headrushing authority. Its sing-along chorus lends the social study a levity the Reznor period denied, and the bite-sized lyrics—bon mots like "Cops and queers make good-looking models"—help the medicine go down. Despite the guitars pumping the hook in the proven grunge tradition, this bouncy sugar pill is radical for Manson not only because it's pop, but also because it's something few '90s rockers have attempted: it's sexy." He went on to conclude, "This born sophist once merely dared to deconstruct sexiness. By now embodying it, Satan's ambitious little helper has relocated Manson theory out of its logical head and into a freshly liberated and femme-y cyborg that sets it in motion. Its slinky gloss going against the rough Reznor grain, Manson's alien mannequeen declares independence from the industrial factory." Spin described the song as a "Warholian discourse on [...] celebrity narcissism set to a creeping, pounding synthetic beat." They described the lyrics as simultaneously "pedantic" and "mildly alarming" but complimented "Manson’s campfire-ghost-story vocals and industrial rhythms" as the perfect complement to "druggy reveries and stomping choruses straight out of T. Rex’s Electric Warrior."

=== Accolades ===
"The Dope Show" was nominated for Best Hard Rock Performance at the 41st Grammy Awards (1999). Spin ranked "The Dope Show" the 3rd Best Single in their 1998 End Of Year List and 17th in their 2018 retrospective The 88 Best Alternative Rock Songs of 1998. The music video for the single would later win the Best Cinematography in a Video category at the 1999 MTV Video Music Awards. The video also won two Billboard Music Awards.

== Formats and track listings ==
"The Dope Show" and "The Beautiful People" written by Marilyn Manson and Twiggy Ramirez; "Sweet Dreams (Are Made of This)" written by Annie Lennox and David A. Stewart; "Apple of Sodom" written by Manson.

- EU CD single (IND95617)
1. "The Dope Show" – 3:47
2. "Sweet Dreams (Are Made of This)" (Live) – 4:33
- UK CD1; maxi-single (UK IND95610 · Canada: INTDS–95599 · Germany: IND95599)
1. "The Dope Show" – 3:47
2. "Sweet Dreams (Are Made of This)" (Live) – 4:33
3. "Apple of Sodom" (Live) – 4:36
- UK CD2 (IND97539)
1. "The Dope Show" – 3:47
2. "The Beautiful People" (Live) – 5:29
3. "The Dope Show" (Enhanced Music Video)
- UK 10-inch picture disc (INVP–95610)
1. "The Dope Show" – 3:47 (Note: Plays same both sides)
- Australian CD single (Note: Individually numbered, engraved covers) (IND95609)
1. "The Dope Show" – 3:47
2. "Sweet Dreams (Are Made of This)" (Live) – 4:33
3. "Apple of Sodom" (Live) – 4:36
4. "The Dope Show" (Enhanced Music Video)
- Japanese CD single (MVCT–12011)
1. "The Dope Show" – 3:45
2. "Sweet Dreams (Are Made of This)" (Live) – 4:32
3. "Apple of Sodom" (Live) – 4:35
4. "The Beautiful People" (Live) – 3:50

== Personnel ==
Credits adapted from the liner notes of Mechanical Animals and "The Dope Show".

- Sean Beavan – engineering and additional production ("The Dope Show"); engineering and mixing (live tracks)
- Michael Beinhorn – production
- Melora Creager – backing vocals ("Apple of Sodom")
- Ginger Fish – drums (live tracks only)
- Madonna Wayne Gacy – piano
- Tom Lord-Alge – mixing ("The Dope Show")
- Marilyn Manson – vocals, electronic drums, production, artwork and illustration
- Twiggy Ramirez – lead, rhythm and bass guitars
- Zim Zum – guitar (live tracks only)

== Charts ==
Chart (1998)	Peak position
Australia (ARIA)	20
Belgium (Ultratip Bubbling Under Flanders)	17
Canada Top Singles (RPM)	14
Canada Rock/Alternative (RPM)	3
Europe (Eurochart Hot 100)	51
Finland Airplay (IFPI Finland)	32
Netherlands (Dutch Top 40 Tipparade)	4
Netherlands (Single Top 100)	63
New Zealand (Recorded Music NZ)	28
Scottish Singles Sales (Official Charts)	16
Spanish Airplay (AFYVE)	36
Sweden (Sverigetopplistan)	53
UK Singles (Official Charts)	12
US Alternative Airplay (Billboard)	15
US Mainstream Rock Airplay (Billboard)	12

== Certifications ==
Region	Certification	Certified units/sales
Sweden (GLF)	Gold	15,000^{^}
^{^} Shipments figures based on certification alone.
