= Nino Ramsby =

Swedish singer-songwriter (born 1972)

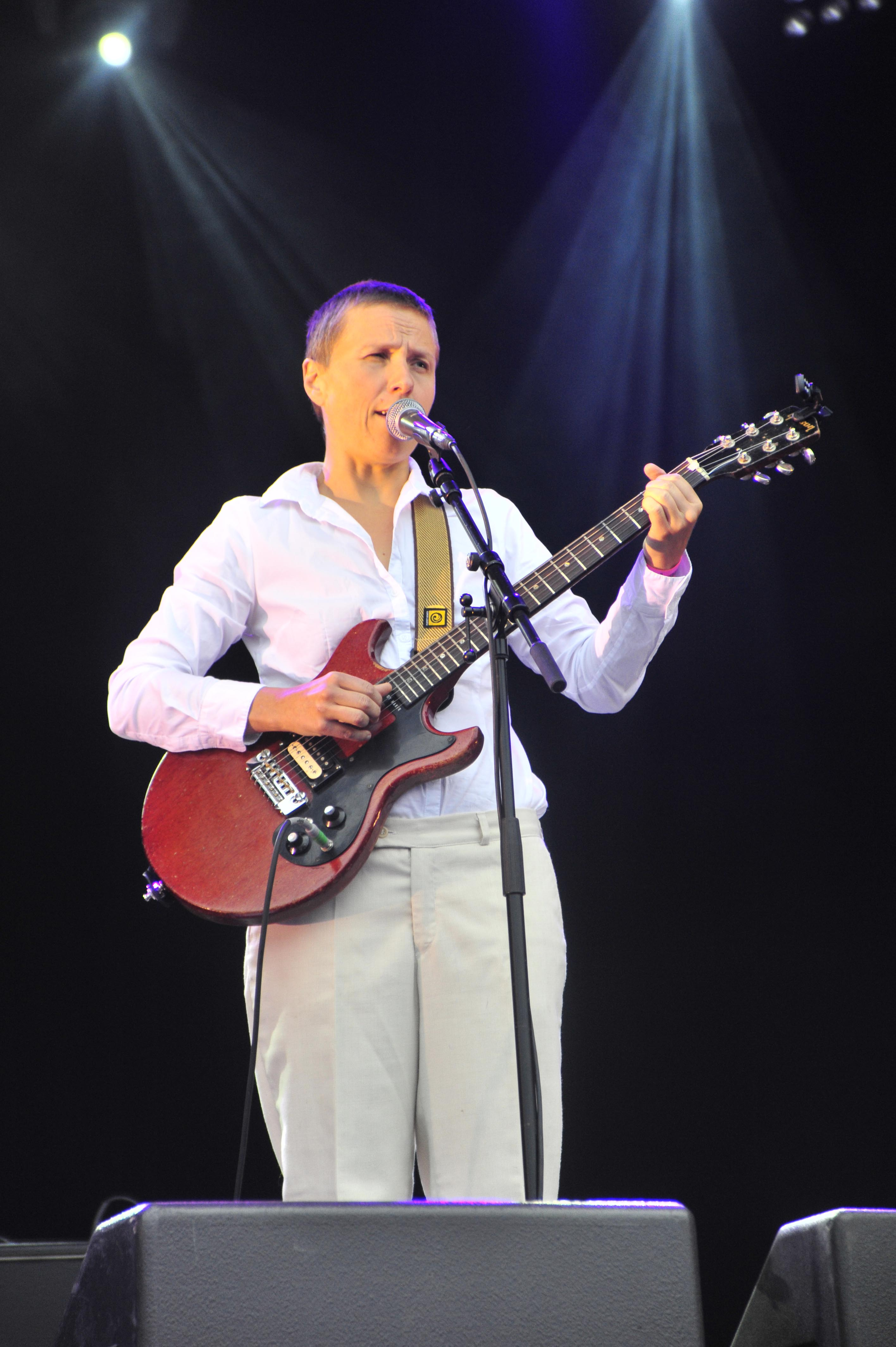
- Nino Ramsby in 2010

Background information
- Born: 21 July 1972 (age 53)
- Origin: Stockholm, Sweden
- Occupations: Singer, songwriter, guitarist
- Website: ninoramsby.se

Nino Ramsby, formerly known as Nina Ramsby, is a Swedish singer-songwriter and musician from Stockholm. During the 1990s he was the vocalist and guitarist for the alternative rock band Salt. He was also part of the bands Baxter and Grand Tone Music. Ramsby was born to a Finnish mother and a Swedish father.

In 2006 Ramsby released an album titled Jazzen with Martin Hederos on Amigo. The album peaked at No. 36 on the Swedish Sverigetopplistan chart. In 2008 he released Du Har Blivit Stor Nu on Moserobie. He also plays and records with the Ludvig Berghe Trio.

== Discography ==
- 2004: Visorna (with Martin Hederos)
- 2006: Jazzen (with Martin Hederos)
- 2008: Du Har Blivit Stor Nu
