= Salt (Swedish band) =

Swedish rock band

Salt was a Swedish grunge/alternative rock band that had one hit single from the album Auscultate, "Bluster", in the United States in 1996. "So" was released as a second single from Auscultate but did not achieve the same level of success.

Salt formed in 1992 after its members had played together informally, with others, at an art school. The group signed with Island Records in 1995, releasing the album Auscultate the following year; this album reached No. 33 on the U.S. Billboard Heatseekers chart. The album's lead single, "Bluster", was a rock radio hit in America, reaching No. 21 on the Modern Rock Tracks chart. The group released a collection of B-sides and unreleased material in 1997.

== Members ==
- Nino Ramsby – guitar, vocals
- Daniel Ewerman – bass
- Jim Tegman – drums

== Discography ==
- Bluster (EP) (Island Independent, 1995)
- Auscultate (Island Records, 1996)
- Delay Me Down and Make Me Wah Wah!! (Meltdown Records, 1997)
