= Noisecreep =

Rock and metal music website

- Website type: Music, news and media
- Owner: Townsquare Media
- Creator: Seth Werkheiser
- Website: noisecreep.com
- Registration: Optional
- Launched: March 2009; 17 years ago

Noisecreep is a hard rock and heavy metal music news and media website based in the United States. The site was created by AOL Music in March 2009.

Noisecreep was the fourth genre-specific music website owned by AOL after the rock music website Spinner, country music website TheBoot and hip hop music website TheBoomBox. Noisecreep is also part of AOL's MediaGlow publishing division which was created in January 2009.

The site publishes music news and interviews presented in a blog-like format, with an emphasis on lesser-known hard rock and heavy metal bands. According to Mike Rich, AOL's head of the entertainment department, "right now with heavy metal and hard rock, unless you're AC/DC or Metallica, you're not getting much play. These bands really haven't had a big platform to say hey, here we are, here's our music." Noisecreep also produces a video podcast dubbed the "Creep Show" which features interviews with various metal bands.

On April 26, 2013, Noisecreep was one of several online music news properties shut down by AOL Music. On June 2, 2013, AOL sold Noisecreep, The Boot and The Boombox to Townsquare Media.
