= Zim Zum =

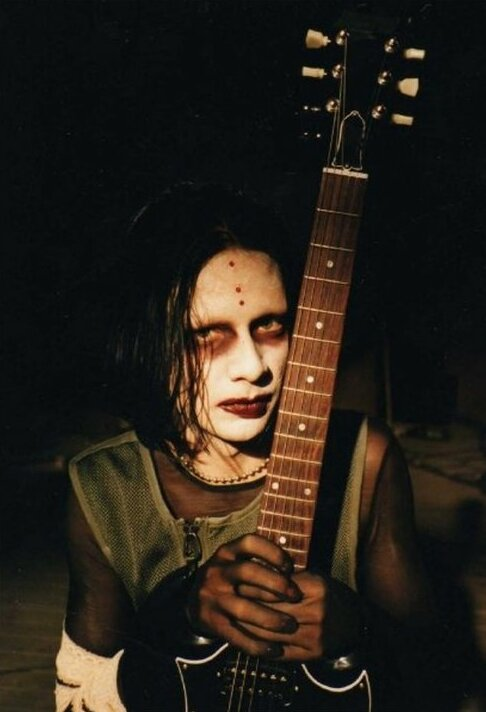
- Zim Zum in 1996

Background information
- Born: Timothy Michael Linton
- Genres: Industrial rock, experimental rock
- Occupations: Musician, songwriter
- Instrument: Guitar
- Years active: 1989–present
- Labels: Nothing; Interscope; Reprise
- Member of: The Pop Culture Suicides; Pleistocene
- Formerly of: Life, Sex & Death; Marilyn Manson
- Website: www.zimzum.com

Timothy Michael Linton, known by the stage name Zim Zum, is an American rock musician-songwriter and former guitarist for Life, Sex & Death and rock band Marilyn Manson (1996–1998). His current projects are Pleistoscene, a solo project, and The Pop Culture Suicides.

== Biography ==
Linton joined Marilyn Manson in 1996, first appearing with the band at Nothing Records' "A Night of Nothing" showcase that was held in 1996 at Irving Plaza in New York City. He toured with the band for the 1996–1997 "Dead to the World" tour. His first video with the band was "The Beautiful People". Linton became the first member of Marilyn Manson to not use a stage name that combined a sex symbol's first and a serial killer's last names.

Linton contributed to all but four of the tracks on the band's 1998 release Mechanical Animals. In July 1998, he left Marilyn Manson, explaining that his departure was the result of his desire to "expand on my own music rather than spending the next 18 months on a tour bus or plane" and described the split as "amicable", despite later animosity with the frontman. In an interview in Guitar World, Linton stated that being in Marilyn Manson had opened new doors and new opportunities in music. Linton departed from the band before the Mechanical Animals supporting tour began. His replacement was John 5.
