= Lorraine Ali =

American journalist

- Born: Los Angeles, California, U.S.
- Occupation: Journalist
- Writing career
- Notable awards: Da Capo Best Music Writing; National Arab Journalists Excellence in Journalism Award
- Website: lorraineali.com

Lorraine Ali (Arabic: لورين علي) is an American journalist and columnist. She is news and culture critic of the Los Angeles Times, where she was previously a senior writer, television critic, and music editor. Her work has appeared in publications such as Rolling Stone, the New York Times, GQ, and Newsweek, where she was a senior writer and music critic from 2000 to 2009. She is a member of the Peabody Awards board of jurors.

== Background ==
Ali was born in Los Angeles California to an Iraqi father and an American mother of French Canadian ancestry.

== Career ==
Ali began her career in the 1990s writing about local Los Angeles music artists for the LA Weekly before becoming a regular writer with the Los Angeles Times under the editorship of Robert Hilburn. Ali's work was included in Da Capo's "Best Music Writing 2001." Ali was a senior critic for Rolling Stone and a music columnist for Mademoiselle. She has written for Esquire, SPIN, The Village Voice, Adweek, Entertainment Weekly, Harper's Bazaar and Option. She wrote a car column for U.H.F in the 1990s before the alternative style magazine folded. She has appeared on Oprah, Charlie Rose, CNN, BBC, among other media outlets, where she has discussed media, entertainment, culture, her relatives in Iraq and American-Muslim issues.

Since the Multi-National Force (sometimes called The Coalition) invasion of Iraq in 2003, Ali has published dozens of stories about her extended Iraqi family, the ensuing refugee crisis and President Donald Trump's 2017 travel ban. She has also written about the portrayal of Muslims in American media, film and television.

== Awards ==
Ali was awarded an East West Center fellowship in 2016, and a Hedgebrook fellowship in 2011.

In 2022, she won first place, Criticism of TV, at the LA Press Club's Southern California Journalism Awards. She also won Best Online Feature from the New York Association of Black Journalists in 2007, and an Excellence in Journalism Award in 2002 from the National Arab Journalists Association. In 1996, she won Best National Feature Story honors at the Music Journalism Awards.
