= Apple of Sodom (song) =

Marilyn Manson song

Song by Marilyn Manson

from the album Lost Highway
- Released: February 18, 1997
- Recorded: 1996
- Genre: Industrial rock
- Length: 4:26
- Label: Nothing; Interscope
- Songwriter: Marilyn Manson
- Producers: Marilyn Manson; Sean Beavan

"Apple of Sodom" is a song by American rock band Marilyn Manson. The track was recorded for the soundtrack to David Lynch's 1997 film Lost Highway. It was written by the band's eponymous vocalist and produced by Manson with Sean Beavan. Lynch personally chose the band to contribute music to the soundtrack as he found Manson inspiring, and because of the band's commercial viability. An industrial song about obsession, it was inspired by Manson's feelings about singer Fiona Apple; the eponymous apple of Sodom is a toxic plant. The song was followed by multiple collaborations between Manson and Lynch.

The track received a mainly positive response from music critics, who commended its composition. A music video was directed by Joseph Cultice, although initially was not made public due to its low-budget nature and depiction of nudity. The clip was released to YouTube in 2009. It garnered critical acclaim and comparisons to the work of Manson's contemporaries.

== Background ==
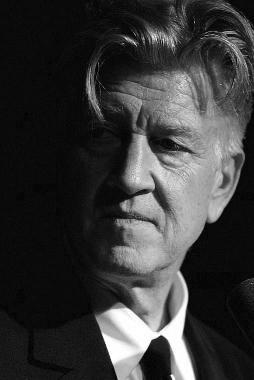
Lynch in 2007

At the suggestion of a mutual friend, David Lynch chose Trent Reznor of Nine Inch Nails to produce the soundtrack to his film Lost Highway (1997). Lynch wanted the soundtrack to feature well-known artists of his choosing who were inspirational to him, as well as commercially viable. Among the artists chosen were Marilyn Manson, Nine Inch Nails, David Bowie, Lou Reed, The Smashing Pumpkins and Rammstein. According to John Balance of Coil, a band that was once going to be featured on the soundtrack album, Lynch "wanted David Bowie, he wanted Marilyn Manson, he wanted whoever he could get. He just said, 'These people are really big. I want this film to be really big.' He didn't give a fuck about the integrity."

When deciding the album's musical direction, Reznor came to the conclusion that it should appeal to fans of Lynch who hate pop music; at the same time, he wanted it to "have some degree of accessibility for the 13-, 14-year-old kid who buys it because I have a new song on it; or for the Smashing Pumpkins fan who buys it for that." Lynch met Manson through Reznor. After meeting with Lynch, Manson contributed two songs to the soundtrack: "Apple of Sodom", which was written specifically for Lost Highway, and a cover of "I Put a Spell on You" by Screamin' Jay Hawkins; the latter had previously been featured on the band's platinum-selling extended play Smells Like Children (1995). Manson told Alternative Press that "Apple of Sodom" is "very much a part of" Antichrist Superstar (1996), despite the fact that it does not appear on that album.

A rumor circulated that Lynch wanted Manson to contribute more music to the soundtrack than he did. However, this has been disputed by Reznor. Manson appeared in Lost Highway in a cameo appearance as a pornographic film actor who unknowingly stars in a snuff film. The role marked Manson's first appearance in a movie. His bandmate Twiggy Ramirez also had a cameo in the film. Since Lynch and Manson met during the production of Lost Highway, Lynch wrote an introduction to Manson's biography The Long Hard Road Out of Hell (1998), and the two collaborated on both an art show and a coffee table book titled Genealogies of Pain (2011).

== Composition and lyrical interpretation ==
"Apple of Sodom"
A 26-second sample of "Apple of Sodom", an industrial song.

"Apple of Sodom" is an industrial song with a length of four minutes and twenty-six seconds. It was written by Manson and produced by him alongside Sean Beavan. Kurt B. Reighley writes in his book Marilyn Manson that the track derives its name from the fruit known as the apple of Sodom. Reighley notes that, if consumed, an apple of Sodom can cause paralysis, severe tremors or death; the toxicity of the apple is referred to in the song's lyric "I've got something you can never eat". The track opens with a whispered, "barely audible" line of dialogue from Lost Highway, where one of the protagonists, Alice (Patricia Arquette), says "You will never have me." "Apple of Sodom" has minimal production led primarily by bass. It features a drum beat reminiscent of jungle music, and a vocal performance that has been described as crooning and a growl. AllMusic and Dan Epstein of Revolver both called the song "ominous".

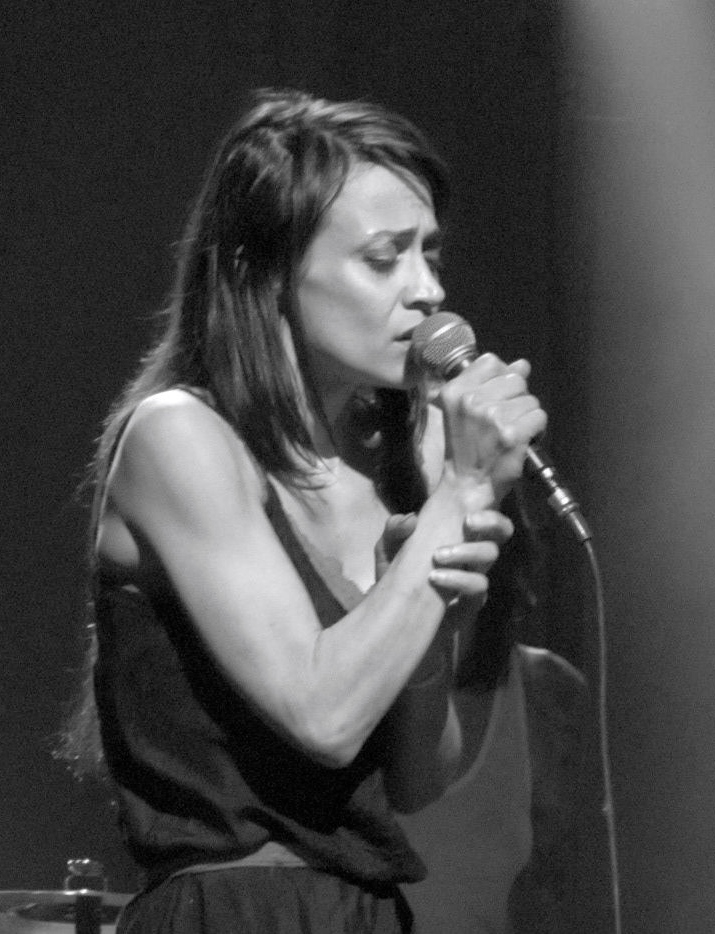
Apple performing in 2012

The song includes lyrics such as "I’m dying, I hope you’re dying too" and "take this from me/hate me, hate me". According to Katie Rife of The A.V. Club, "Apple of Sodom" uses imagery of moral decay, physical decay, and original sin. Reighley wrote that the song's lyrics make it similar to the songs on the band's album Antichrist Superstar, while AllMusic perceived themes of sex, seduction and reflection in the track. Manson discussed the song's meaning in a 1998 Spin article, saying "that song's about obsession and things you can never have". He added that "in a distant way" it was inspired by his feelings toward Fiona Apple, a singer he deemed "sexy and fragile—definitely too fragile for me". Manson elaborated that he was a "huge fan" of Apple's music, and that "If I was ever to be put in a circumstance where I could have sex with her, I would decline because her vagina is probably too precious to be dirtied by my filthy cock."

== Critical reception ==
In a review of the Lost Highway soundtrack, The Daily Aztec praised "Apple of Sodom" and the band's version of "I Put a Spell on You", saying that they "both make listeners feel like they're entering something dangerous. Manson's screaming and jungle drum beats give the songs a sarcastic, stereotypical horror film feeling, and at the same time the tunes are among the catchiest on the record." James P. Wisdom of Pitchfork described "Apple of Sodom" and "I Put a Spell on You" as "reasonably good" and superior to the Angelo Badalamenti instrumentals on the Lost Highway album.

Katie Rife of The A.V. Club called "Apple of Sodom" a "grimy" song that "straddles the line between the erotic and the terrifying". Fact deemed it one of the greatest songs ever to appear in or be inspired by a Lynch project, alongside the Pixies' cover of "In Heaven" from Eraserhead (1977) and Julee Cruise's "Falling" from Twin Peaks. Kerrang!'s Jason Arnopp said that the song "sees the band in sinister, down-paced mode, brilliantly complementing the overall feel of the soundtrack." Daisy Jones of Dazed said that Manson's "razor-sharp" contributions to the soundtrack helped Lost Highway become a cult film.

Alec Chillingworth of Metal Hammer put "Apple of Sodom" fourth on the magazine's list of Manson's ten most underrated songs. Chillingworth wrote that "the track never really kicks off. And that's the beauty of it. It's not about a quiet/loud dynamic. It's not about a chorus that's going to stay on the radio until radios are no more. 'Apple of Sodom' is an early example of Manson being able to evoke a precise atmosphere through nothing more than bare instrumentation and that inimitable voice of his." Slant Magazine's Jeremiah Kipp felt that the inclusion of Marilyn Manson and Nine Inch Nails songs in Lost Highway "places [the film] in the mid-1990s...sadly losing the timelessness of most of Lynch's work".

== Music video ==
A music video was made for the song, directed by Joseph Cultice. According to Manson, it never aired on MTV due to its depiction of nudity and its low-budget nature. It was released to the public in 2009, when Cultice uploaded it to YouTube. In a review of the video for Bloody Disgusting, Jonathan Barkan commented: "This is one of those videos that is so iconically from the early to mid 90s. The out of focus moments, the strange, sinister imagery, the strong usage of colors to highlight the different vignettes." Barkan called the video "pretty" and noted similarities between it and the music videos of Manson's contemporaries Alice in Chains, Soundgarden, and Tool. Dan Epstein of Revolver said: "In retrospect, the video's grainy quality actually makes it powerfully effective, especially in the cinematic scene where the nude, alien-like female pulls a plug out of her torso and proceeds to bleed to death." Epstein ranked the clip fourth on Revolver's list of the "5 Most Horrifying Moments from Marilyn Manson Music Videos". Noisey's Alexandra Serio viewed the nudity in the clip as part of the band's history of "pissing off Jesus Christ".

== Personnel ==
Credits adapted from the liner notes of Lost Highway.

- Marilyn Manson – songwriter, producer
- Sean Beavan – producer, mixer

== See also ==
- List of songs recorded by Marilyn Manson
