= Remix & Repent =

EP by Marilyn Manson
- Released: November 25, 1997
- Recorded: 1997
- Genre: Industrial metal
- Length: 24:29
- Labels: Nothing; Interscope

Marilyn Manson chronology
Antichrist Superstar (1996)	Remix & Repent (1997)	Mechanical Animals (1998)

Remix & Repent is an EP by American rock band Marilyn Manson. It was released on November 25, 1997, during their Antichrist Superstar period. It features remixes of songs from Antichrist Superstar, live tracks recorded during the Dead to the World tour, and an acoustic version of "Man That You Fear".

== Critical reception ==
Professional ratings
Review scores
Source	Rating
AllMusic	2.5/5 stars

Johnny Walker, in reviewing for MTV, summarized his review of the EP and the band's career thus far, "Those who would like to comfort themselves with the notion that Marilyn Manson is just a temporary aberration, an unpleasant interlude in their lives of waking sleep, overlook the fact that beyond all the outrage, this band is packing some musical dynamite."

== Track listing ==
All lyrics are written by Brian Warner (Marilyn Manson).

No.	Title	Music	Length
1.	"The Horrible People"	Twiggy Ramirez	5:14
2.	"The Tourniquet Dance Mix" (Edit)	Daisy Berkowitz; Ramirez	4:11
3.	"Dried Up, Tied and Dead to the World" (Live in Utica, NY)	Manson; Ramirez	4:26
4.	"Antichrist Superstar" (Live in Hartford, CT)	Ramirez; Gacy	5:17
5.	"Man That You Fear" (Acoustic Requiem for Antichrist Superstar)	Ramirez; Manson; Gacy; Berkowitz	5:23
Total length:			24:29

== Charts ==
Chart (1997)	Peak position
Australian Singles Chart	49
Canadian Albums Chart	69
Finnish Singles Chart	18
Spanish Singles Chart	9
UK Singles Chart; Import	163
Billboard 200	102
