= 25th parallel =

25th parallel may refer to:

- 25th parallel north, a circle of latitude in the Northern Hemisphere
- 25th parallel south, a circle of latitude in the Southern Hemisphere
- 25th Parallel, a Florida lifestyle magazine
