= Tourniquet (Marilyn Manson song) =

Single by Marilyn Manson

from the album Antichrist Superstar
- B-side: "The Tourniquet Prosthetic Dance Mix"
- Released: 1997
- Recorded: New Orleans, Louisiana, 1996
- Genre: Industrial rock; gothic rock
- Length: 4:29 (single and album version); 4:44 (extended fade version)
- Label: Nothing; Interscope
- Composers: Twiggy Ramirez; Daisy Berkowitz
- Lyricist: Marilyn Manson
- Producers: Trent Reznor; Dave Ogilvie; Marilyn Manson

Marilyn Manson singles chronology
"Long Hard Road Out of Hell" (1997)	"Tourniquet" (1997)	"The Dope Show" (1998)

Music video
- "Tourniquet" on YouTube

"Tourniquet" is song by American rock band Marilyn Manson. It was released as the second single from their second studio album Antichrist Superstar (1996). It was written by frontman Marilyn Manson, co-founder Daisy Berkowitz and longtime bassist and guitarist Twiggy Ramirez. Like many other songs from Antichrist Superstar, the industrial rock and gothic rock song's lyrics are based on a dream Manson had. The image this song conveys is that of the main character in a world of sorrow and self-pity, prior to his transformation into the Little Horn.

The song garnered a mixed-to-positive response from music critics, who praised its hook and moodiness. Critics noted similarities between "Tourniquet" and the music of Alice Cooper, as well as the emerging nu metal scene. The single was only released in Europe, so the band targeted dance clubs with its B-side, "The Tourniquet Prosthetic Dance Mix", remixed by Sean Beavan and Manson himself. Its music video was directed by Floria Sigismond, who went through a period of sleep deprivation to get inspiration, and was controversial for its grotesque imagery. Commercially, the single peaked within the top 40 of Billboard's Mainstream Rock chart, as well as the national charts of Finland, Spain and the UK.

== Background and release ==
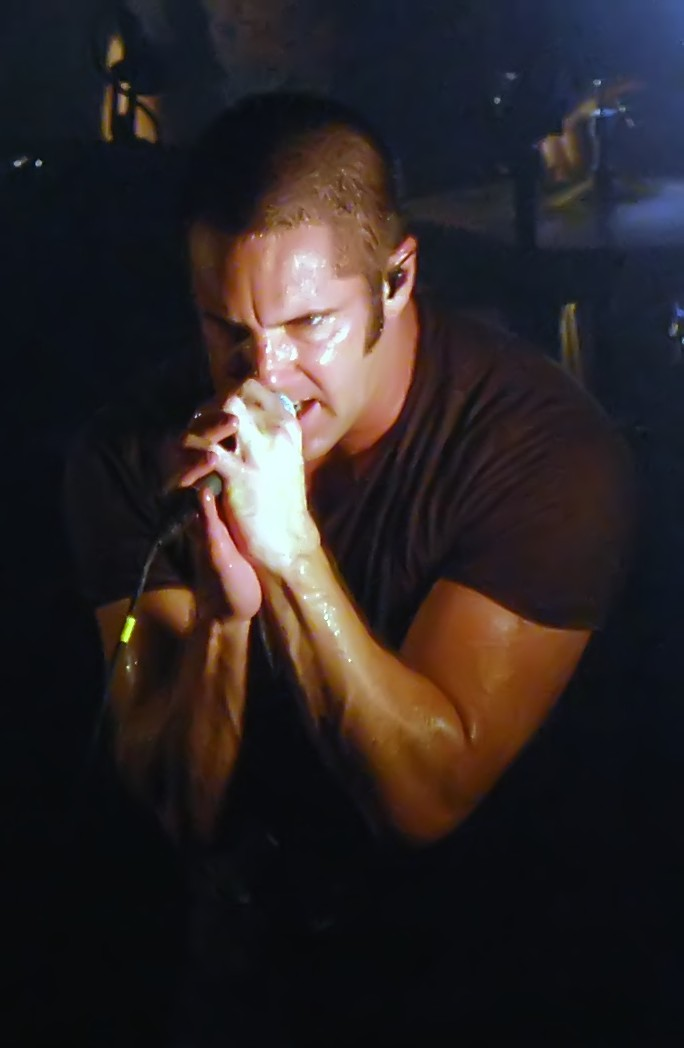
Trent Reznor felt Marilyn Manson's vocals on "Tourniquet" were too theatrical.

Marilyn Manson was in a poor mental state when recording vocals for "Tourniquet," resulting in one of his most emotional performances on the album. Channeling his angst, and using what energy he had left, producers Trent Reznor and Dave Ogilvie thought he sounded too theatrical. This caused him to binge on "liquor, pills and drugs." To make matters worse, Reznor had driven by his house next morning, only to find his girlfriend, Missi, had overdosed. "She was shivering, but her skin was stippled with sweat, which had soaked into the sheets around her," he wrote. Scared for her life, he rushed Missi to the hospital, where a doctor explained she was three months pregnant. If she decided to have an abortion, which she did she would have to wait until her flu went away.

"Tourniquet" made its first appearance on October 8, 1996, as the fourth track on the concept album, Antichrist Superstar, where it concludes Cycle I: The Heirophant. It was released as the second and final single from the album in 1997, after "Long Hard Road Out of Hell", the band's single with British trip hop band Sneaker Pimps for the soundtrack to the motion picture Spawn. The single was only released in Europe, with Marilyn Manson targeting the British market by including a dance remix of the song, "The Tourniquet Prosthetic Dance Mix", as the B-side. A promotional single was released in the US, with "The Tourniquet Prosthetic Dance Mix" not seeing a localization until a shorter edit was included on the EP, Remix & Repent, released November 25, 1997.

The single of "Tourniquet" peaked within top 40 of the national charts in Finland and the UK. The song's highest position was in Spain, peaking at No. 6, but it also charted in Australia and New Zealand, reaching No. 52 and No. 41, respectively. The single was also successful on OCC's Scotland and Rock & Metal charts. Overall, the song peaked at No. 50 on Billboard's Eurochart Hot 100. The promotional single in the US appeared on the Mainstream Rock chart, peaking at No. 30 and staying on the chart for seven weeks.

== Composition and lyrics ==
"Tourniquet"
A 27-second sample of "Tourniquet"

"Tourniquet" is an industrial rock and gothic rock song with a length of four minutes and thirty seconds. A somber song, it has a tempo of 90 beats per minute. It can also be used double-time at 180 beats per minute, is high energy and is somewhat danceable with a time signature of 4 beats per bar. A "harsh, sexy track" with an "almost ballad-like quality," the song is an example of the band's "rough-around-the-edges" early work, and is seen as foreshadowing the, then emerging, nu-metal scene. Diamond Rowe of American nu metal band Tetrarch even categorized the song as such, when picking the nine best guitar solos in the genre. The song was written by Manson with the band's bassist Twiggy Ramirez, and its then-guitarist Daisy Berkowitz, and produced by Manson with Trent Reznor and Dave Ogilvie; it also features elements of blues and grunge.

"Touniquet" begins with the backwards message "This is my lowest point of vulnerability". This is followed by mid-paced guitar riffs, and "mercilessly tortured vocals intermingling in an atmospheric masterclass." Ramirez composed a lead guitar part to the song that has been described as both "sexy and creepy," two words that are often associated with Marilyn Manson's discogaphy, but according to Diamond Rowe, this song stands out for "how seamless they all feel in conjunction with all of the other elements of the song." Ramirez plays a "super short but effective" guitar solo after the first chorus.

Like many Marilyn Manson songs from the first three albums, some of the lyrics to this song were previously a poem that Manson had written prior to the formation of the band. Lorraine Ali of Rolling Stone wrote that while the influence of Alice Cooper is present throughout Antichrist Superstar, it is "full-blown" on "Tourniquet". Manson told Rolling Stone: "I've always had these dreams about making a girl out of all these pieces of prosthetic limbs, and then taking my own hair and teeth that I saved from when I was a kid and very ritualistically creating this companion." Those dreams were the inspiration for "Tourniquet".

== Music video ==
The video for "Tourniquet" was directed by Floria Sigismondi, who also directed the video for "The Beautiful People". Sigismondi says that directing the video got her to gain confidence in herself and her "offbeat ideas". In order to gain inspiration for the video, she went through a period of sleep deprivation, and was elated to see her ideas for the video "manifest into physical form." Sigismondi discussed the video's impact with Claire Lobenfeld of Fact, saying "It was shocking to see that so many people responded to that [video's] imagery like they did. I'm sure there was a lot of different things at work there – the song, the lyrics, [Manson's] image – coupled with the video, but I do believe that in a way we all have the same rooted fears and dreams – part of that 'collective unconscious'."

== Critical reception ==
Professional ratings
Review scores
Source	Rating
AllMusic	2.5/5 stars

"Tourniquet" received generally mixed-to-positive reviews from music critics. Stephen Thomas Erlewine gave two reviews for AllMusic. First, he reviewed the English single and said "The Tourniquet Prosthetic Dance Mix" is a "pretty good" reworking of the song, but concluded the single gets monotonous due to both B-sides being the same remix of "Tourniquet", but with different lengths. When reviewing the greatest hits album Lest We Forget: The Best Of (2004), he stated "Not every [Marilyn Manson] single had a great hook -- 'Tourniquet' is a moody dirge, indicative of what awaits a listener on the album tracks". Axl Rosenberg of MetalSucks called "Tourniquet" and "Lunchbox" some of "Manson's best early material".

Matt Zakosek of The Chicago Maroon called the track "weary Goth-rock junk" and criticized its inclusion on the greatest hits album Lest We Forget: The Best Of (2004). Gil Bieler of laut.de called the song a ballad, and praised its "superb guitar work," but criticized Manson's vocals, who "in his soulful agony, doesn't give a damn about the right key."

=== Accolades ===
"Torniquet" was voted to number 2 on a poll of Marilyn Manson's best songs, held by Revolver, who described the song as "emotional," despite its "dour rasp" and as relevant in the modern day, then July 17, 2019, as it was at the time of Antichrist Superstar's release. Graham Hartmann of Loudwire ranked the song at number 5 on his list of the "10 Best Marilyn Manson Songs," who praised it for being interpretable in different ways: Is Manson's message masochistic in nature? Do his lyrics address a relationship with substance abuse? Perhaps both ... Perhaps neither." Sam Law of Kerrang! also placed the song at number 5 on his list of "The 20 Greatest Marilyn Manson Songs" and wrote it "spun listeners into a soundscape of sorrow and self pity that was deeper and less lurid than they were previously used to."

== Track listing ==
Australian Release

1. "Tourniquet" - 4:29
2. "The Tourniquet Prosthetic Dance Mix" - 7:24
3. "The Horrible People" - 5:12

UK (CD I) / European Release

1. "Tourniquet" - 4:29
2. "The Tourniquet Prosthetic Dance Mix" (edit) - 4:10
3. "The Tourniquet Prosthetic Dance Mix" - 7:24

UK (CD II) Release

1. "Tourniquet" - 4:29
2. "Lunchbox" - 4:34
3. "Next Motherfucker" (Lunchbox) - 4:48

=== Promo ===
U.S. Release

1. "Tourniquet" - 4:29

UK 7"

- A-Side: "Tourniquet" - 4:29
- B-Side: "The Perfect Drug" - 5:15

UK 12"

- A & B Side
1. "The Tourniquet Prosthetic Dance Mix" - 7:24
2. "The Tourniquet Prosthetic Dance Mix" (Edit) - 4:10

== Personnel ==
Musicians

- Marilyn Manson – vocals, lyrics
- Daisy Berkowitz – guitar, music
- Twiggy Ramirez – bass guitar, music
- Madonna Wayne Gacy – keyboards
- Ginger Fish – drums

Production

- Trent Reznor – producer
- Dave "Rave" Ogilvie – producer
- Marilyn Manson – co-producer
- Sean Beavan – mixing
- Chris Vrenna – editing and programming

== Charts ==
Chart performance for "Tourniquet"
Chart (1997)	Peak position
Australia (ARIA)	52
Europe (Eurochart Hot 100)	50
Finland (Suomen virallinen lista)	16
New Zealand (Recorded Music NZ)	41
Scotland Singles (OCC)	27
Spain (AFYVE)	6
UK Singles (OCC)	28
UK Rock & Metal (OCC)	1
US Mainstream Rock (Billboard)	30
