= Antichrist Superstar =

1996 studio album by Marilyn Manson

Studio album by Marilyn Manson
- Released: October 8, 1996
- Recorded: February–August 1996
- Studios: Nothing, New Orleans
- Genres: Industrial metal; industrial rock; alternative metal; gothic rock
- Length: 71:49
- Labels: Nothing; Interscope
- Producers: Sean Beavan; Marilyn Manson; Dave Ogilvie; Trent Reznor

Marilyn Manson chronology
Smells Like Children (1995)	Antichrist Superstar (1996)	Remix & Repent (1997)

Singles from Antichrist Superstar
- 1. "The Beautiful People" Released: September 22, 1996; 2. "Tourniquet" Released: September 8, 1997

Antichrist Superstar is the second studio album by American rock band Marilyn Manson. It was released on October 8, 1996, by Nothing and Interscope Records. It was recorded at Nothing Studios in New Orleans and produced by the band's eponymous vocalist along with Sean Beavan, former Skinny Puppy producer Dave Ogilvie and Trent Reznor of Nine Inch Nails. The recording of the album was marred by excessive drug use, which provoked a high level of antagonism between band members. Consequently, it was their last release to feature contributions from founding guitarist Daisy Berkowitz, who was acrimoniously fired partway through recording.

A rock opera and a concept album, Antichrist Superstar was the first installment in a trilogy which included succeeding releases Mechanical Animals (1998) and Holy Wood (In the Shadow of the Valley of Death) (2000). The central storyline on the album revolved around a supernatural being who seizes all power from humanity in order to initiate an apocalyptic end event; a populist demagogue who is driven solely by resentment, misanthropy, and despair, he uses his newfound position to destroy the world. The record can be seen as a social critique, utilizing this premise as a metaphor for the perceived fascist elements of the conservative political movement and the Christian right in North America.

Preceded by "The Beautiful People", whose music video received three nominations at the 1997 MTV Video Music Awards, the album was both a critical and commercial success. Lorraine Ali of Rolling Stone credited Antichrist Superstar with ending the dominance of grunge within popular music. In the years since its release, various publications have listed it among the best albums of the 1990s. The album debuted at number three on the Billboard 200, and has sold almost two million copies in the United States alone. As of 2011, worldwide album sales had surpassed over seven million copies.

The album was supported by the controversial "Dead to the World Tour", which was heavily criticized by elements of the Christian right. Nearly every North American venue the band visited was picketed by religious organizations, predominantly because of unfounded, exaggerated claims of onstage drug use, bestiality, and Satanic rituals, including animal and even human sacrifice. The band also found itself the target of congressional hearings, which attempted to implicate the group in a fan's suicide. Several previously unreleased recordings were issued on soundtracks throughout 1997, including "Apple of Sodom" and "Long Hard Road Out of Hell".

== Background and development ==
Marilyn Manson was formed in 1989 by the vocalist and by the guitarist Daisy Berkowitz. For the next seven years, the name of every band member was created by combining the stage name of a female pop culture icon with the surname of a male serial killer. Their highly visualized concerts quickly earned them a loyal fanbase in the South Florida punk and hardcore music scene. Within six months of forming, they were performing sold-out concerts in 300-capacity nightclubs throughout Florida. Eventually, the band gained the attention of Nine Inch Nails vocalist Trent Reznor, who signed them to his Nothing Records vanity label; Reznor produced their 1994 debut album, Portrait of an American Family. This was followed by the 1995 EP Smells Like Children, which contained their commercially successful single, a cover of the Eurythmics' "Sweet Dreams (Are Made of This)".

== Recording and production ==
Antichrist Superstar was a really gruesome transformation physically, mentally and musically. It was conceived and written while I was enduring a lot of physical pain. I was unable to feel anything emotionally.

— Marilyn Manson on the album's arduous recording process.

Antichrist Superstar was recorded over an eight-month period at Nothing Studios in New Orleans by an extensive group of musicians. Along with the remaining members of Marilyn Manson—Twiggy Ramirez, Madonna Wayne Gacy, and Ginger Fish—Nine Inch Nails guitarists Robin Finck and Danny Lohner and drummer Chris Vrenna participated. The record was initially produced by the vocalist alongside Trent Reznor and former Skinny Puppy producer Dave Ogilvie. The process of creating the album was long and difficult, highlighted by experiments involving near-constant drug use and sleep deprivation in an effort to create a violent and hostile environment suited to the album's content. Manson has admitted to heavily experimenting with prescription painkillers—including forms of morphine sulphate and hydrocodone—during recording; he also claimed he regularly inserted sewing needles underneath his fingernails to test his pain threshold.

Initial sessions were unproductive, and routinely culminated in the destruction of the studio, as well as the group's own equipment and instruments. There was also a high level of antagonism between band members, with most of this directed toward founding guitarist Daisy Berkowitz. He later claimed to have been "shut out" of recording sessions, and alleged that much of his equipment was destroyed, such as the four-track recorder which had been used to produce many of the band's early demos, along with his drum machine. The latter was subsequently revealed to have been thrown from a second-story window. This animosity resulted in Ramirez performing the majority of guitar work on the record.

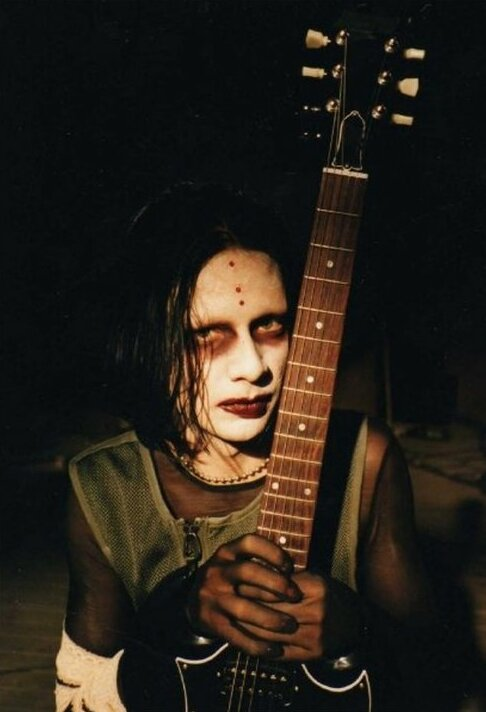
Berkowitz's replacement Zim Zum during the album's promotional campaign

Berkowitz was highly critical of Reznor, who, he said, purposely destroyed a Fender Jaguar given as a gift to Berkowitz from his then-recently deceased father, explaining: "I was in the studio, and they were all in the control room, and I'm playing guitar. At the end, Trent says, 'Do it again, but do it more like this.' We went through this three times, and he says, 'Hold on. I'll come in there. Let me show you what I'm talking about.' So I take my guitar off, hand it to him—and he smashes it, just to fuck with me. Then he laughed and left the room." Berkowitz acrimoniously exited the group sometime after this incident. Reznor's relationship with the rest of the band—Manson in particular—also began to deteriorate during production, primarily as a result of creative differences. (Note: "Not only was nothing getting done, but everyone was telling me that it was weak, poorly executed and simply a repeat of what Trent had already done with The Downward Spiral. ...But maybe they [Trent Reznor and Dave Ogilvie] had never really taken the time to listen to and understand the idea. Maybe the album they had in mind for Marilyn Manson was not the one I had in mind. It seemed like Trent and I wanted to make different records. I saw Antichrist Superstar essentially as a pop album—albeit an intelligent, complex and dark one. I wanted to make something as classic as the records I had grown up on. Trent seemed to have his heart set on breaking new ground as a producer and recording something experimental, an ambition that often ran in opposition to the tunefulness, coherence and scope I insisted on. I had always relied on Trent's opinion in the studio, but what was I supposed to do now that our opinions differed? No matter what anyone said, I knew Antichrist Superstar was not the same as The Downward Spiral, which was about Trent's descent into an inner, solipsistic world of self-torment and wretchedness. Antichrist Superstar was about using your power, not your misery, and watching that power destroy you and everyone else around you.") Manson and Reznor have not recorded material together since the release of Antichrist Superstar.

Ogilvie was eventually blamed for the band's dysfunction, and was fired as co-producer. He was replaced by frequent Nine Inch Nails mixer Sean Beavan. Manson and Beavan then spent several weeks reworking and remixing the majority of the album in Nothing Records' auxiliary recording facility; Reznor had started production on the soundtrack to David Lynch's Lost Highway in the primary studio, and was often absent from these later sessions. Manson went on to praise Beavan's influence on both the album and band as a whole, describing him as being "like a magnet, drawing the band back in the studio and back together." The pair are the sole credited producers of three songs on the record: "Dried Up, Tied and Dead to the World", "Kinderfeld" and "Minute of Decay". Berkowitz's replacement on lead guitar joined the band shortly after the album was completed. Timothy Linton adopted Zim Zum as his stage name, ending the seven-year tradition of naming members after female icons and male serial killers; his name was derived from the Lurianic Kabbalah concept of tzimtzum.

== Concept and themes ==
[Antichrist Superstar is] about me growing up and wanting to become something that people would adore, instead I grew up and became something that people hated.

— Marilyn Manson

Antichrist Superstar is a rock opera concept album, and its title is based on the 1971 Andrew Lloyd Webber musical Jesus Christ Superstar. The central storyline of the album revolves around a supernatural being—a demagogic rockstar—who seizes all political power from humanity in order to initiate an apocalyptic end event. This underlying concept was both inspired by and a tribute to the work of German philosopher Friedrich Nietzsche, specifically his philosophical concept of an Übermensch. It was also influenced by "the idea of putting yourself through a transformation to become something superhuman", which Manson said he garnered from Nietzsche's The Antichrist. The album is a social critique which utilizes this premise as a metaphor for the perceived fascist elements of the conservative political movement and the Christian right in North America. Manson also cited David Bowie's "We Are the Dead" (1974) as a major influence on the album lyrically, saying: "I remember hearing [that] song in the Nineties, when I first moved to L.A. It wouldn't have had the same impact on me if I'd heard it when I was a kid in Ohio—it felt like it was about the culture of Hollywood, the disgusting cannibalism."

== Composition and style ==
Major influences on Antichrist Superstar

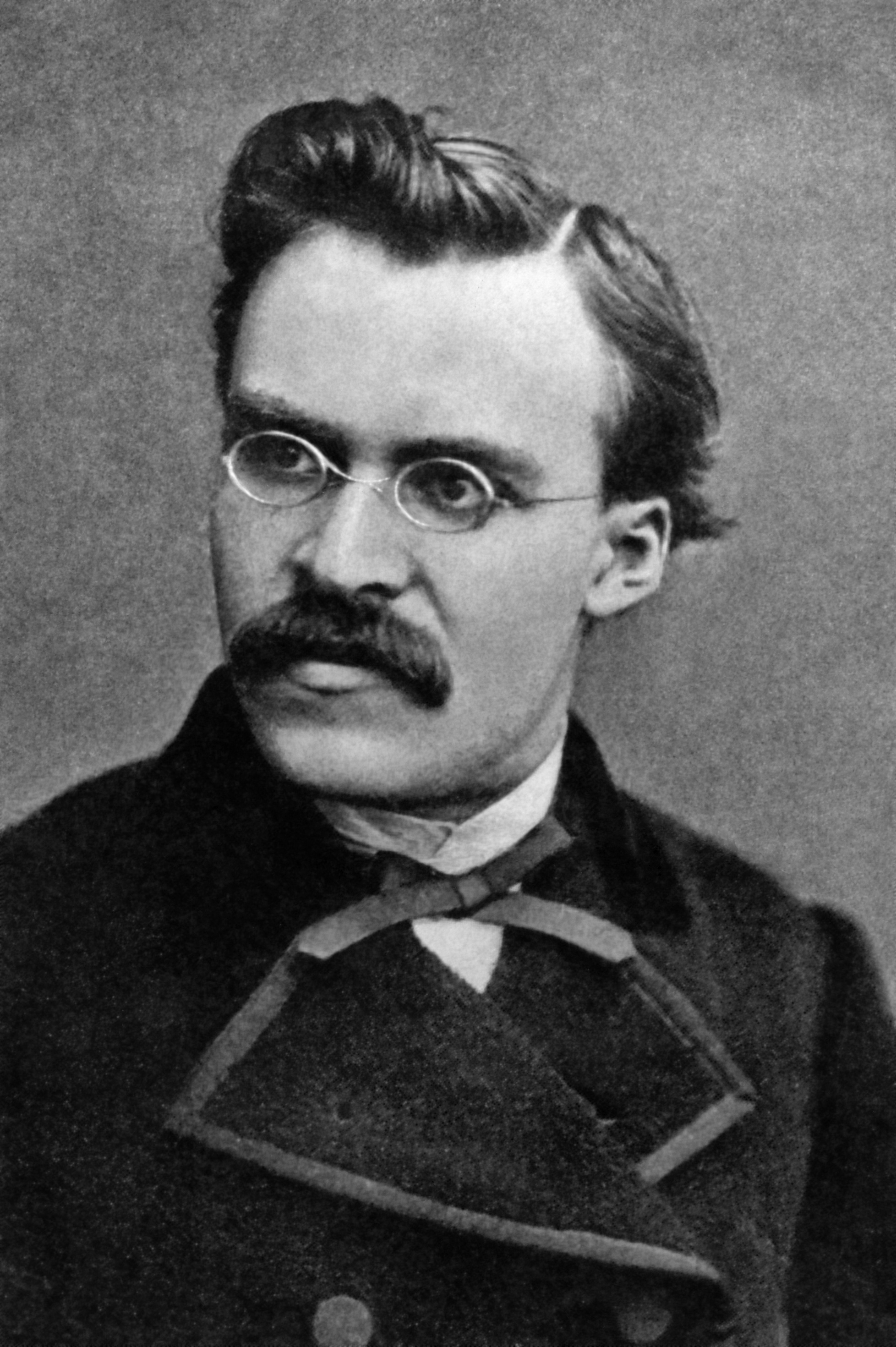
The album is a tribute to the philosophy of Friedrich Nietzsche.

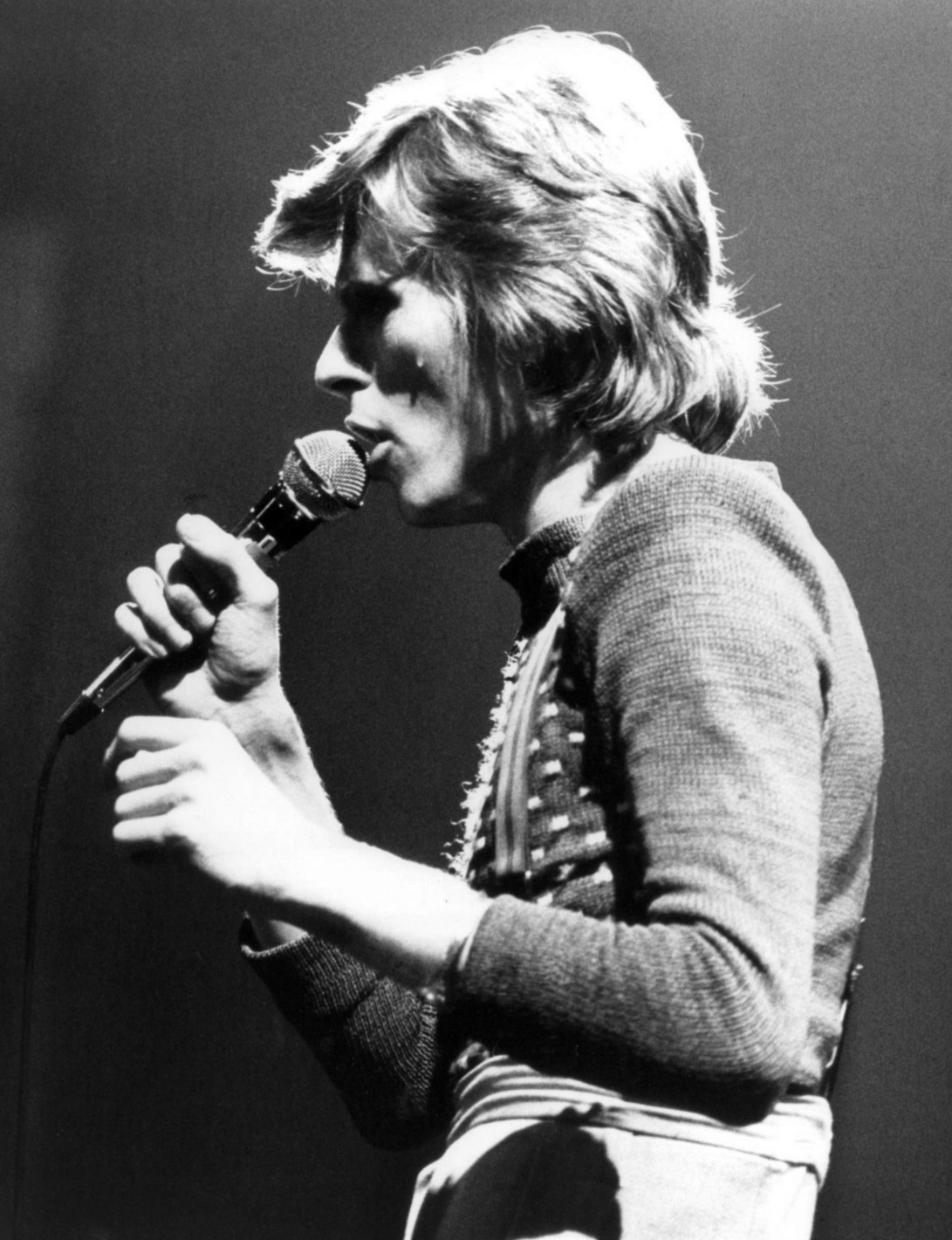
David Bowie's showmanship heavily inspired Manson, a lifelong fan.

Antichrist Superstar is primarily an industrial metal, industrial rock, alternative metal and gothic rock album, and contains material which has been described as death metal, progressive metal and new wave. The record is separated into three sections: "The Heirophant", "Inauguration of the Worm", and "Disintegrator Rising". In the final section, the central character transforms into the Antichrist Superstar: a populist demagogue whose motivations transcend any conceivable sense of morality. Nihilistic and disgusted by humankind, it initiates a genocidal extermination of the human race, eventually destroying the entire planet. The album is also cyclical, with both its opening and closing seconds consisting of the distorted phrase "When you are suffering, know that I have betrayed you".

Ramirez composed much of the music on the record, and regularly asked for input from Reznor, who he said was "the only other string musician" in the studio on a regular basis, elaborating: "Writing the songs was nothing, but going in and recording them we made some changes. It was nice to have [Trent] there, like another member of the band to help me have another outlook at some of the stuff, because Daisy had run out of ideas and just did not contribute whatsoever." Reznor is credited with co-composing the music of three songs on the album. After the release of Holy Wood (In the Shadow of the Valley of Death) in 2000, Manson revealed that Antichrist Superstar formed a conceptual trilogy alongside both the aforementioned album and 1998's Mechanical Animals. He explained that the trilogy was an autobiographical story told in a reverse timeline (chronologically reverse from their release dates), with the storyline beginning on Holy Wood, followed by Mechanical Animals, and Antichrist Superstar acting as its conclusion. Furthermore, although Antichrist Superstar and Mechanical Animals made sense as individual concept albums, there was an overarching story running through each release.

=== Cycle II: Inauguration of the Worm ===
"Cryptorchid" is a shorter track that can be thought of as an interlude. The title is both a compound of the words "crypt" and "orchid" and a direct reference to the medical condition of cryptorchidism. Stereogum called the song a "uniquely beautiful track" and identified its roots in the avant-garde and ambient genus of industrial music comparing it favorably to the music of Coil, "albeit an unusually rock-centric one." The song is divided into two sections. In the first half, Manson's vocals are rendered deadpan using several layers of microphone filters while it is altered in the second with a vocoder to augment a Mellotron played over a pulsing sinus rhythm. On close listening, the phrase "I wish I had balls" is whispered repeatedly in the middle to bridge both sections. Crowning it the band's 6th best song in their top 10 list, Stereogum mused of "an alternative history" where the band explored the song's experimental direction further throughout the record.

=== Cycle III: Disintegrator Rising ===
The title song ends with Apple Inc.'s 1990's synthetic speech program PlainTalk (also known as MacinTalk) voices repeating, "When you are suffering, know that I have betrayed you". MacinTalk voices are used again in the music video. During live performances of the song, the MacinTalk voices repeat "You might as well kill yourself — you're already dead" at the end of the song.

The song "1996" was the subject of legal action brought against the band by former bassist Gidget Gein, over alleged similarities to a demo titled "She's Not My Girlfriend". The latter had first been recorded in 1990, four years before Ramirez had joined the group.

== Release and artwork ==
One of my proudest moments was seeing a picture on the cover of The Wall Street Journal of Senators Orrin Hatch and Joe Lieberman holding the album package up in front of the Senate. They were pointing out the harm that the music industry was doing to all of the sweet, innocent children of America.

— P. R. Brown, the designer of the album artwork.

Antichrist Superstar features elaborate artwork. Images in the booklet consist of various medical diagrams from Henry Gray's Anatomy of the Human Body, Kabbalah symbols, and a visual worm-to-angel metamorphosis, references to verses one through five of Revelation 12, as well as liner notes—a note found under the lyrics of "Irresponsible Hate Anthem" claims the song was recorded live on February 14, 1997, despite the album being released in October 1996.

Artwork for the album was designed by P. R. Brown. It was the first of several albums Brown designed for the band. In an interview with Revolver, Brown recounted that his working relationship with the band started on the recommendation a friend in 1996 while working in New York City. The band was recording the album at Nothing Studios at the time and were actively looking for a cover art designer. By Brown's admission, the extent of his experience designing album covers up to that point had been limited to jazz records. After researching into who Manson was, he realized it was "pointless" to send the band any of his prior work. Brown decided to spend a weekend "creating fictitious album covers for made-up bands" and sent those to New Orleans. After several months of hearing nothing back, Brown was invited to Nothing Studios to meet with Manson.

During their meeting, Manson asked Brown to watch E. Elias Merhige's 1989 experimental horror film Begotten. According to Brown, Manson already had a strong idea of what he wanted the album cover to look like, drawing inspiration from the bleak cinematography of this "grainy, scratched nightmare of a film." After a listening session of the unfinished record and an explanation of the album's concept and three cycle structure, both agreed that the record needed two covers to portray the "evolution from a worm into the antichrist." Brown utilized Dean Karr's photographs of the band and mixed media for the packaging. He recalled "drawing some things and scanning in several layers of dirt" during the design process. The paperboard O-card slipcase depict Manson as "the worm" in the front with yellowed, scabrous wings and black superficial veins. A medical diagram of a rib cage can also be seen on the top left corner. On the back, Manson is shown as the Antichrist Superstar in suit and tie, along with the stylized high voltage symbol used by the band as the album's logo. The roman numerals IX, VI, III and VII round out the rear of the slipcase.

The words "Heart, Mind, Complacent, and Malice" are also featured on the front of the O-card and throughout the booklet. They were originally from one of the fictitious album covers Brown made. Brown explained that he conceived of them after he "picked opposing ideals and turned them into a symbolic compass of sorts: Heart is the opposite of mind, and complacency is the opposite of malice. Strangely enough, all of those things fit into the concept of the album. The exact graphic I used for the fake albums was used for the final package." Brown suspected it was the reason he was hired. The back of the tray insert depicts Manson standing between Ramirez and Gacy while the latter two wear oxygen masks connected to his codpiece. Senator Joseph Lieberman found the image particularly offensive. Mistaking the standing figure for a naked woman Lieberman denounced, "These records and their corporate sponsors are telling our children it's the season of senseless violence, hopelessness and the most awful ill will toward each other, particularly women."

== Promotion and singles ==
"The Beautiful People"
A sample of "The Beautiful People"

"The Beautiful People" was released as the lead single, and both the song and its accompanying music video were critical and commercial successes. The track was a hit on alternative rock charts in the United States, reaching number 26 on Billboard's Modern Rock Tracks, and number 29 on Mainstream Rock. It was successful internationally as well, peaking within the top fifty in both Australia and New Zealand, and was their first top-20 entry on the UK Singles Chart. Floria Sigismondi directed the song's music video, which was included at number fifty-four on MTV's list of the "100 Greatest Music Videos Ever Made", and at number 100 on MuchMusic's "100 Greatest Videos Ever". The video was nominated for Best Rock Video, Best Special Effects and Best Art Direction at the 1997 MTV Video Music Awards, where the band performed the song live. This performance was controversial, and has been listed as one of the most iconic in the shows' history. It was later credited with helping to establish the band in mainstream culture. VH1 included the song at number eighty-six on their list of the "100 Greatest Hard Rock Songs". By the end of 1997, Manson appeared on the cover of Rolling Stone, who awarded the band their "Best New Artist" accolade.

"Antichrist Superstar" was released as a promotional single in 1996. Music videos for both that song and "Cryptorchid" were created by E. Elias Merhige. The video for "Cryptorchid" heavily incorporated imagery from Merhige's film Begotten, while the video for "Antichrist Superstar" remained unreleased until 2010, when it was leaked on YouTube. The latter had been screened at the 1997 San Francisco International Film Festival, where it won a Golden Gate Certificate of Merit Award. However, its release was blocked by Interscope Records, whom Manson described as being "appalled by it." It combined performance footage and fascist iconography—namely the Nuremberg rallies—with footage of US nuclear weapons testing, and images of a Ku Klux Klan lynching.

Numerous outtakes and previously unreleased recordings were issued on movie soundtracks throughout 1997. "Apple of Sodom" appeared on the Reznor-produced soundtrack to David Lynch's Lost Highway in February. A music video for the song was created in 1996, and also remained unreleased until its director, Joseph Cultice, uploaded it to YouTube in 2009. "The Suck for Your Solution" appeared on the soundtrack to the Howard Stern biopic Private Parts, which was also released in February. "Long Hard Road Out of Hell", featuring backing vocals from Sneaker Pimps vocalist Kelli Ali, was released on the soundtrack to Spawn in August. The following month, "Tourniquet" was issued as the album's second commercial single, and peaked at number 28 on the UK Singles Chart. Its music video was also directed by Sigismondi. W.I.Z. directed the final music video created for Antichrist Superstar: "Man That You Fear", whose concept was adapted from the plot of Shirley Jackson's 1948 short story "The Lottery", and contained aesthetic and symbolic references to the 1989 Alejandro Jodorowsky film Santa Sangre.

=== Tour ===
The album was promoted by the highly controversial year long "Dead to the World Tour." The tour was preceded by a performance on the second evening of Nights of Nothing, the final leg of Nine Inch Nails' "Self Destruct Tour," on September 5, 1996, at the Irving Plaza. The band's set ended early after Manson sent his drummer to the hospital by hurling a weighted mic stand at the drumkit. The evening was documented on a special episode of the MTV series 120 Minutes titled "120 Minutes of Nothing". The tour commenced a month later, on October 3, 1996, at the State Theatre in Kalamazoo, Michigan, and consisted of 175 concerts staged in several continents. The band's now-trademark theatricality was a cornerstone of the shows. By the frontman's own estimation, however, it was less extravagant than prior or succeeding outings. Manson still enraged conservatives and the Christian Right with near-nightly concerts wherein he wiped his buttocks with the flag of the United States, tore Bibles apart, and performed self-mutilation.

The tour mounted several set pieces. Depending on venue size, the backdrop consisted of a stained glass tableau that depicted Jesus flanked by figures impaled on spears or, alternatively, Saint Michael the Archangel slaying the dragon during the War in Heaven from the 9th verse of the twelfth chapter of the Book of Revelation. For smaller venues, the band used a crumbling mullioned and traceried Gothic cathedral window. The stage design also included a pipe organ and a set of stairs from which Manson descended to start the opening piece. Manson's costume changes were limited between his signature elastic back brace matched to a jockstrap over a G-string, a pair of thigh-high fishnet hosiery attached to a garter belt and calf-high leather boots used for most of the show alternating to a black suit and tie over a red dress shirt for performances of the title song.

During the title song, the stage design was converted into a mock Nuremberg Rally. The backdrop was switched from the stained glass tableau to three oversized vertical banners unfurled from the rafters and emblazoned with the album's logo. Manson performed atop a similarly emblazoned rostrum mimicking the exaggerated gyrations of dictators and televangelists, suggesting a similarity between the two. The rest of the band performed wearing chromed stahlhelms. In his autobiography The Long Hard Road Out of Hell, Manson described that portion of the show as simultaneous critiques on both the inherent fascism in Christianity and "right-wing morality" as well as the thin line between celebrity and demagoguery, "because rock and roll can be just as blind as Christianity." A snow/ash-like confetti was used during performances of "Cake and Sodomy", "Cryptorchid" and "Apple of Sodom" while a microphone stand covered in orchids was used during the song "Man That You Fear."

So-called morality has repressed the human spirit to such an extent that only hate remains. Rock 'n' roll can metamorphose its practitioners into the energetic embodiment of that hate, freeing them from the lie of a good society. Marilyn Manson, a lowly worm in this concept, enacts that process and becomes the Antichrist Superstar everyone secretly desires [to be]. He ain't pretty folks, but he's our just deserts.

— Spin writer Ann Powers' interpretation of the album's underlying concept.

The tour was plagued by constant bomb and death threats, and nearly every North American venue the band visited was picketed by religious and civic organizations. Opponents of the band based their protests on a pair of affidavits circulated by the American Family Association and Empower America that made unfounded claims of onstage drug abuse, bestiality, and satanic rituals—namely animal and human sacrifice—and claims the band engaged in homosexual intercourse with each other in concert, and that underage concertgoers were violently raped by other audience members. In this context, Utah passed legislation which allowed state-operated venues to ban the group from performing. Similarly, the April 10, 1997, concert at the state-owned Carolina Coliseum in Columbia was cancelled after the South Carolina House of Representatives voted to ban Marilyn Manson from ever performing on state-owned property.

During this time, schools in Florida threatened to expel students for attending the band's concerts, and over 5,500 residents contacted the mayor of Jacksonville, demanding the cancellation of their April 17, 1997, concert at the Jacksonville Memorial Coliseum. The city council of Richmond, Virginia, also ordered the cancellation of their May 10, 1997, concert at the Richmond Coliseum. The July 22, 1997, concert at La Luna in Portland, Oregon, was cancelled when the venue was unable to obtain insurance for the event. Their concert at Calgary's Max Bell Arena three days later was cancelled by the owner of the venue who cited the band's reputation as justification for doing so. The New Jersey date of Ozzfest at Giants Stadium was cancelled by the New Jersey Sports and Exposition Authority, who cited Marilyn Manson's scheduled appearance as its reason. This prompted a lawsuit from Ozzy Osbourne.

During the vocalist's appearance on ABC network's late-night political talk show Politically Incorrect, host Bill Maher took the opportunity to discuss the controversy surrounding the tour. Maher noted the distinction between the rumors and the reality of what the band's concerts consisted of. However, he observed that what Manson actually did on stage—specifically his repeated flag desecration and destruction of the Bible—were still genuinely offensive. Manson replied:

Absolutely. They're designed to make people think. But the point with the Bible or flag is to say, "It's only as valid as you make it in your heart." A piece of paper or a piece of cloth doesn't mean anything. It's what you believe. And I want people to think about what they believe. I want them to consider if everything they've been taught, if that's what they want to believe or if that's what they've been told that they have to believe.

The tour was documented in several formats. The band's second EP, Remix & Repent, released on November 25, 1997, contained live versions of "Dried Up, Tied and Dead to the World" and "Antichrist Superstar" and an acoustic version of "Man That You Fear" taken during the tour. A VHS concert film entitled Dead to the World was released on February 10, 1998, and debuted at number one on Billboard's Top Music Videos, eventually spending a year on the chart. The album was reissued on cassette exclusively in Europe as part of Record Store Day 2016.

== Critical reception ==
Professional ratings
Review scores
Source	Rating
AllMusic	4.5/5 stars
Chicago Tribune	3/4 stars
Encyclopedia of Popular Music	4/5 stars
Entertainment Weekly	B
The Great Rock Discography	8/10
Los Angeles Times	1.5/4 stars
Rolling Stone	3.5/5 stars
The Rolling Stone Album Guide	3/5 stars
Spin	8/10
USA Today	3.5/4 stars

The album was released to acclaim from music critics, who praised its concept, production, and vocals. M. Tye Comer, in reviewing for CMJ New Music Monthly, described the record as a "magnificent ... aural skull-fuck", writing that Marilyn Manson "[took] in all the angst, hellfire and damnation one band [could] ingest, then [released] it in a fierce scatological display of apocalyptic sound and fury." He went on to commend the vocals, which he said could "communicate pain, passion, fear, hate and euphoria in one mighty, ear-piercing roar." Greg Kot of the Chicago Tribune complimented the album's production, as did Jim Farber of Entertainment Weekly, who also praised its "ambitious" concept, even as he criticized the band's sound as derivative of other industrial rock acts: "[E]ach riff could've fallen right off an old Skinny Puppy LP."

Writing for Spin, Ann Powers applauded the album's concept and the quality of the songwriting, saying: "Until now, Manson's ideas carried more weight than his music, but Antichrist Superstar's sound matches the garish grandiosity of his arguments. Its 16 songs rock like '70s Sabbath-style metal, but harder; the arrangements echo Queen in operatic scope but are more intense; the mood owes its vampiric chill to Bauhaus, but [Marilyn Manson] actually bites the vein." Stephen Thomas Erlewine of AllMusic called it "an unexpectedly cohesive album" that stands as Marilyn Manson's "definitive statement". However, he was critical of Reznor's production, saying: "Though the sonic details make [the album] an intriguing listen, it's not as extreme as it could have been—in particular, the guitars are surprisingly anemic, sounding like buzzing vacuums instead of unwieldy chainsaws." Even less impressed, Robert Christgau dismissed the record as a "dud" and later compared it to the music used by the United States military to psychologically harass Manuel Noriega during Operation Nifty Package.

In Rolling Stone, Lorraine Ali credited both the album and the band's associated rise within mainstream culture as "[marking] the end of the reign of punk realism in rock & roll", calling the record "a volatile reaction to five years of earnest, post-Nirvana rock." She went on to hypothesize that: "Marilyn Manson offer total escapism as a true alternative, complete with carefully crafted gloom wear (no baggy shorts allowed), a frontman who blatantly begs to be in the spotlight and lyric imagery rivaling that of the best slasher movies." Similarly, a 2016 article from The A.V. Club called the record influential, suggesting that its success prompted a shift in rock music which resulted in other rock bands "trading grunge's bruised-heart jadedness for seething, self-flagellating nihilism."

=== Political reaction ===
The release of Antichrist Superstar coincided with the band's commercial breakthrough, and much of the attention they received from mainstream media was not positive. In December 1996, the co-directors of Empower America Republican Secretary of Education William Bennett and Democrat Senator Joseph Lieberman, organized a bipartisan press conference, along with Secretary of Pennsylvania State C. Delores Tucker, wherein they questioned MCA—the owner of Interscope—president Edgar Bronfman Jr.'s ability to head the label competently while profiting from "profanity-laced" albums by artists such as Tupac Shakur, Snoop Doggy Dogg and Marilyn Manson. Tucker had previously called Smells Like Children the "dirtiest, nastiest porno record directed at children that has ever hit the market."

In November 1997, the band found itself the target of congressional hearings, led by Senator Joseph Lieberman and Representative Sam Brownback, to determine the effects, if any, of violent lyrics on young listeners. This hearing was held by the Committee on Homeland Security and Governmental Affairs, and was titled "Music Violence: How Does It Affect Our Children". At this subcommittee, Lieberman once again criticized the band's music, calling it "vile, hateful, nihilistic and damaging", and repeated his request that Seagram—then-owner of MCA—"start ... disassociating itself from Marilyn Manson." Lieberman later called the band "perhaps the sickest group ever promoted by a mainstream record company." The subcommittee also heard from Raymond Kuntz, of Burlington, North Dakota, who blamed his son's suicide on Antichrist Superstar—specifically the song "The Reflecting God".

=== Accolades ===
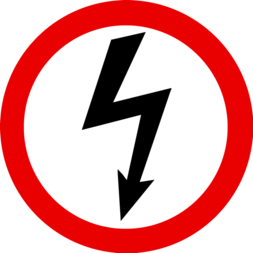
Stylized version of the international high voltage safety symbol "Caution, risk of electric shock" (ISO 3864), used by the band as a logo for the album

The record has been listed in books including Robert Dimery's 1001 Albums You Must Hear Before You Die, and 1,000 Recordings to Hear Before You Die. In 2008, Consequence of Sound identified Antichrist Superstar as a modern classic in their "Dusting 'Em Off" feature, due to its counter-cultural and social impact during the late '90s. Rolling Stone included it among their "Essential Recordings of the '90s" in 1999, and placed it at number 84 on their "100 Best Albums of the '90s" list, which was compiled in 2011.

The album has been featured in multiple lists compiled by several British rock magazines. Kerrang! dubbed it the 3rd best album of 1996, and placed it at number 14 on their list of "100 Albums You Must Hear Before You Die", as well as at number 88 on its "100 Greatest Rock Albums". In 2001, it featured on Q's list of the "50 Heaviest Albums Of All Time", while NME placed it at number 92 on their 2009-compiled list of the "100 Greatest Heavy Metal Albums". It also appeared at number 92 on Classic Rock's list of the "100 Greatest Rock Albums Ever".

Multiple international publications included it in their respective lists of the best albums of 1996, including the French edition of British magazine Rock Sound, who placed it at number 13, Dutch magazine Muziekkrant OOR ranked it at number 109 on their "Best Albums of 1996", while Alternative Nation included the album at number 8 on their list of the "Top Rock Albums of 1996". German rock magazine Visions ranked the album at number 37 on their list of "The Most Important Records of the Nineties".

Publication	Country	Accolade	Year	Rank	Ref.
Alternative Nation	United States	Top Rock Albums of 1996	2016	8	
Classic Rock	United Kingdom	100 Greatest Rock Albums Ever	2001	92	
Kerrang!	United Kingdom	Albums of the Year	1996	3	
Kerrang!	United Kingdom	100 Albums You Must Hear Before You Die	1998	14	
Kerrang!	United Kingdom	The 100 Greatest Rock Albums	2006	88	
Muziekkrant OOR	Netherlands	Albums of the Year	1996	109	
NME	United Kingdom	100 Greatest Heavy Metal Albums	2009	92	
Q	United Kingdom	50 Heaviest Albums of All Time	2001		
Rock Sound	France	Albums of the Year	1996	13	
Rolling Stone	United States	The Essential Recordings of the '90s	1999		
Rolling Stone	United States	100 Best Albums of the '90s	2011	84	
Visions	Germany	The Most Important Albums of the '90s	2000	37	

== Commercial performance ==
Antichrist Superstar sold 132,000 copies in its first week to debut at number three on the Billboard 200 in the United States. The album was certified platinum by the Recording Industry Association of America (RIAA) on December 11, 1996, and sold over 1.2 million copies within a year of its release. As of November 2010, the record had sold almost two million copies in the US alone, according to Nielsen SoundScan. It peaked at number two on the national RPM albums chart in Canada, where it has been certified double platinum by Music Canada (formerly the Canadian Recording Industry Association) for shipments in excess of 200,000 units. In Mexico, the record was certified gold by Asociación Mexicana de Productores de Fonogramas y Videogramas (AMPROFON), indicating shipments of over 100,000 copies.

The album's international commercial success was initially modest, however, peaking at number 13 on the Finnish Albums Chart, but failing to make an impact on the album charts in both France and Germany, peaking at numbers 116 and 100, respectively. In Spain's albums chart, the album peaked at number 43, despite its second single Tourniquet being a top-10 hit there. Despite peaking at number 73 on the UK Albums Chart and spending a sole week on the chart, Antichrist Superstar was certified gold by the British Phonographic Industry (BPI) in July 2013 for shipments of over 100,000 copies. Similarly, the record spent six non-consecutive weeks on the ARIA Charts, peaking at number 41, and was certified gold by the Australian Recording Industry Association (ARIA). Conversely, it became the band's commercial breakthrough in New Zealand, peaking within the top five and spending a total of 45 weeks on the New Zealand Albums Chart, where it was eventually certified platinum. Antichrist Superstar has sold in excess of seven million copies worldwide.

== Track listing ==
All lyrics are written by Marilyn Manson, except "Irresponsible Hate Anthem" written by Manson and Twiggy Ramirez.

Cycle I: The Heirophant
No.	Title	Music	Length
1.	"Irresponsible Hate Anthem"	Daisy Berkowitz; Madonna Wayne Gacy	4:17
2.	"The Beautiful People"	Ramirez	3:38
3.	"Dried Up, Tied and Dead to the World"	Manson; Ramirez	4:15
4.	"Tourniquet"	Berkowitz; Ramirez	4:29

Cycle II: Inauguration of the Worm
No.	Title	Music	Length
5.	"Little Horn"	Ramirez; Trent Reznor	2:43
6.	"Cryptorchid"	Gacy	2:44
7.	"Deformography"	Ramirez; Reznor	4:31
8.	"Wormboy"	Berkowitz; Ramirez	3:56
9.	"Mister Superstar"	Ramirez	5:04
10.	"Angel with the Scabbed Wings"	Manson; Ramirez; Gacy	3:51
11.	"Kinderfeld"	Ramirez; Gacy	4:51

Cycle III: Disintegrator Rising
No.	Title	Music	Length
12.	"Antichrist Superstar"	Ramirez; Gacy	5:14
13.	"1996"	Ramirez	4:01
14.	"Minute of Decay"	Manson	4:44
15.	"The Reflecting God"	Ramirez; Reznor	5:36
16.	"Man That You Fear"	Ramirez; Manson; Gacy; Berkowitz	6:10
99.	"Empty Sounds of Hate" (hidden track)	Gacy; Ramirez	1:38
Total length:			71:49

Notes

- Tracks 17–98 consist of a few seconds of silence each: track 17 is 9 seconds, tracks 18–97 are 4 seconds each, and track 98 lasts 5 seconds.

== Personnel ==
Credits adapted from the liner notes of Antichrist Superstar.

Marilyn Manson

- Marilyn Manson – vocals, guitars, acoustic guitar, bass, pan flute
- Twiggy Ramirez – guitars, acoustic guitar, bass
- Daisy Berkowitz – guitars
- Madonna Wayne Gacy – keyboards, loops, and other original pieces of 16-bit audio information
- Ginger Fish – drums, programming

Additional musicians

- Sean Beavan – guitars, guitar synthesizer (track 2), programming
- Charlie Clouser – programming
- Robin Finck – additional guitar, keyboards
- Danny Lohner – lead guitar (track 10), acoustic guitar (track 15)
- Trent Reznor – Mellotron (track 6), additional guitar (track 7), lead guitar (track 9), Rhodes piano (track 16), programming
- Chris Vrenna – drums (track 11), programming

Technical personnel

- Marilyn Manson – production
- Tom Baker – mastering (at Future Disc Systems in Hollywood)
- Sean Beavan – digital audio editing, engineering, production, mixing
- P. R. Brown – digital illustration, design
- Charlie Clouser – digital audio editing
- Dean Karr – photography
- Dave Ogilvie – digital audio editing, engineering, production, mixing
- Brian Pollack – additional engineering
- Trent Reznor – production (except "Dried Up, Tied and Dead to the World", "Kinderfeld" and "Minute of Decay")
- Chris Vrenna – digital audio editing, engineering, mixing

== Charts ==
=== Weekly charts ===
Chart (1996–97)	Peak position
Australian Albums (ARIA)	41
Austrian Albums (Ö3 Austria)	37
Canada Top Albums/CDs (RPM)	2
Finnish Albums (Suomen virallinen lista)	13
French Albums (SNEP)	116
German Albums (Offizielle Top 100)	100
Hungarian Albums (MAHASZ)	21
New Zealand Albums (RMNZ)	5
Spanish Albums (AFYVE)	43
Swedish Albums (Sverigetopplistan)	50
UK Albums (Official Charts)	73
UK Rock & Metal Albums (Official Charts)	7
US Billboard 200	3

Chart (2025)	Peak position
Greek Albums (IFPI)	65

=== Year-end charts ===
Chart (1996)	Peak position
Canada Top Albums/CDs (RPM)	26
US Billboard 200	157

Chart (1997)	Peak position
Canadian Albums (Nielsen Soundscan)	87
Canadian Hard Rock Albums (Nielsen Soundscan)	9
New Zealand Albums (RMNZ)	18
US Billboard 200	75

== Certifications ==
Region	Certification	Certified units/sales
Argentina (CAPIF)	Gold	30,000^{^}
Australia (ARIA)	Gold	35,000^{^}
Canada (Music Canada)	2× Platinum	200,000^{^}
Mexico (AMPROFON)	Gold	100,000^{^}
New Zealand (RMNZ)	Platinum	15,000^{^}
United Kingdom (BPI)	Gold	100,000^{^}
United States (RIAA)	Platinum	1,900,000
^{^} Shipments figures based on certification alone.
