= Man That You Fear =

Promotional single by Marilyn Manson

from the album Antichrist Superstar
- Released: 1997
- Recorded: Nothing Studios, New Orleans
- Genre: Industrial rock
- Length: 6:10 (album version); 4:18 (radio edit)
- Label: Nothing
- Songwriters: Marilyn Manson (lyrics); Twiggy Ramirez; Marilyn Manson; Madonna Wayne Gacy; Daisy Berkowitz (music)
- Producers: Trent Reznor; David "Rave" Ogilvie

Audio sample
- "Man That You Fear": file; help

"Man That You Fear" is a song by American rock band Marilyn Manson. It was released as the second promotional single from their second studio album, Antichrist Superstar, and is the final song on the album.

The line, "Sticking to my pointy ribs/ Are all your infants in abortion cribs" refers to a story told in The Long Hard Road Out of Hell in which Manson as a child found a coffee can with something rotting inside. His mother told him it was discarded meat, but later told him that it was actually an aborted fetus. Manson initially penned the song during his cousin Chad's wedding ceremony. In his autobiography, The Long Hard Road Out of Hell Manson writes that the wedding was the first time he'd been in a church since his childhood. He recounts feeling uncomfortable during the service and imagining himself marrying a black woman or gay man. He says it was during this service that he conceived of the closing line for the Antichrist Superstar album: "The boy that you loved is the man that you fear."

On the album version, the final two minutes repeat the phrase "When all of your wishes are granted, many of your dreams will be destroyed." The synthesized voices at the end of the song appear courtesy of the MacInTalk speech feature of Apple's Macintosh computers.

== Music video ==
In the music video, directed by W.I.Z., Manson portrays a man who is condemned to die. He is "chosen" by a blindfolded child who spins around pointing her finger. When she stops spinning, she removed the blindfold and sees the trailer home that she is pointing to — the home of the condemned. The video features all events of his last day on earth, leading up to his death by stoning in an isolated location of the desert. The procession into the desert involves various strangely dressed characters, including a child wearing a mask in the form of a horse's head and a character waving a stick and dancing in circles.

According to Marilyn Manson, the video was partly inspired by "The Lottery" (a short story by Shirley Jackson).

== Track listing ==
US Promo Release

1. "Man That You Fear" (Radio Edit) - 4:18
