= Long Hard Road Out of Hell =

Single by Marilyn Manson and Sneaker Pimps

from the album Spawn: The Album
- Released: July 22, 1997
- Recorded: 1997 at Unique Studios, New York City
- Genre: Arena rock; Gothic rock
- Length: 4:21
- Label: Nothing; Interscope
- Songwriters: Marilyn Manson; Twiggy Ramirez
- Producers: Manson; Sean Beavan

Marilyn Manson singles chronology
"The Beautiful People" (1996)	"Long Hard Road Out of Hell" (1997)	"Tourniquet" (1997)

Music video
- "Long Hard Road Out of Hell" on YouTube

"Long Hard Road Out of Hell" is a song by American rock band Marilyn Manson and British trip hop band Sneaker Pimps. It was released as a single from the soundtrack to the 1997 motion picture Spawn. "Long Hard Road Out of Hell" is an arena rock and gothic rock song written by Marilyn Manson and Twiggy Ramirez and produced by Manson and Sean Beavan. Its lyrics are about self-loathing and its title is derived from John Milton's Paradise Lost (1667). After the track was written, the Sneaker Pimps' Kelli Ali was recruited to perform background vocals on it, as the Spawn soundtrack featured collaborations between hard rock artists and electronic music artists. The Sneaker Pimps were dissatisfied with the final track and wanted a remix of it to be released as a single instead; conversely, Manson deemed it a personal favorite.

"Long Hard Road Out of Hell" received mixed reviews from music critics; some found it heartfelt while others felt it was too indistinct from other Marilyn Manson songs. Commentators noted that the track encapsulated the evolution of the band's sound from the industrial music of Antichrist Superstar (1996) to the glam rock of Mechanical Animals (1998). Manson initially approached Jonathan Glazer to direct the video for the track, but rejected his concept for it; Glazer later used his concept for the video for Radiohead's "Karma Police" (1997). The music video for "Long Hard Road Out of Hell" was directed by Matthew Rolston. It depicts Manson in a dress and a group of models who initially appear to be female but are revealed to be male. The clip garnered acclaim from critics for its imagery.

== Background and release ==
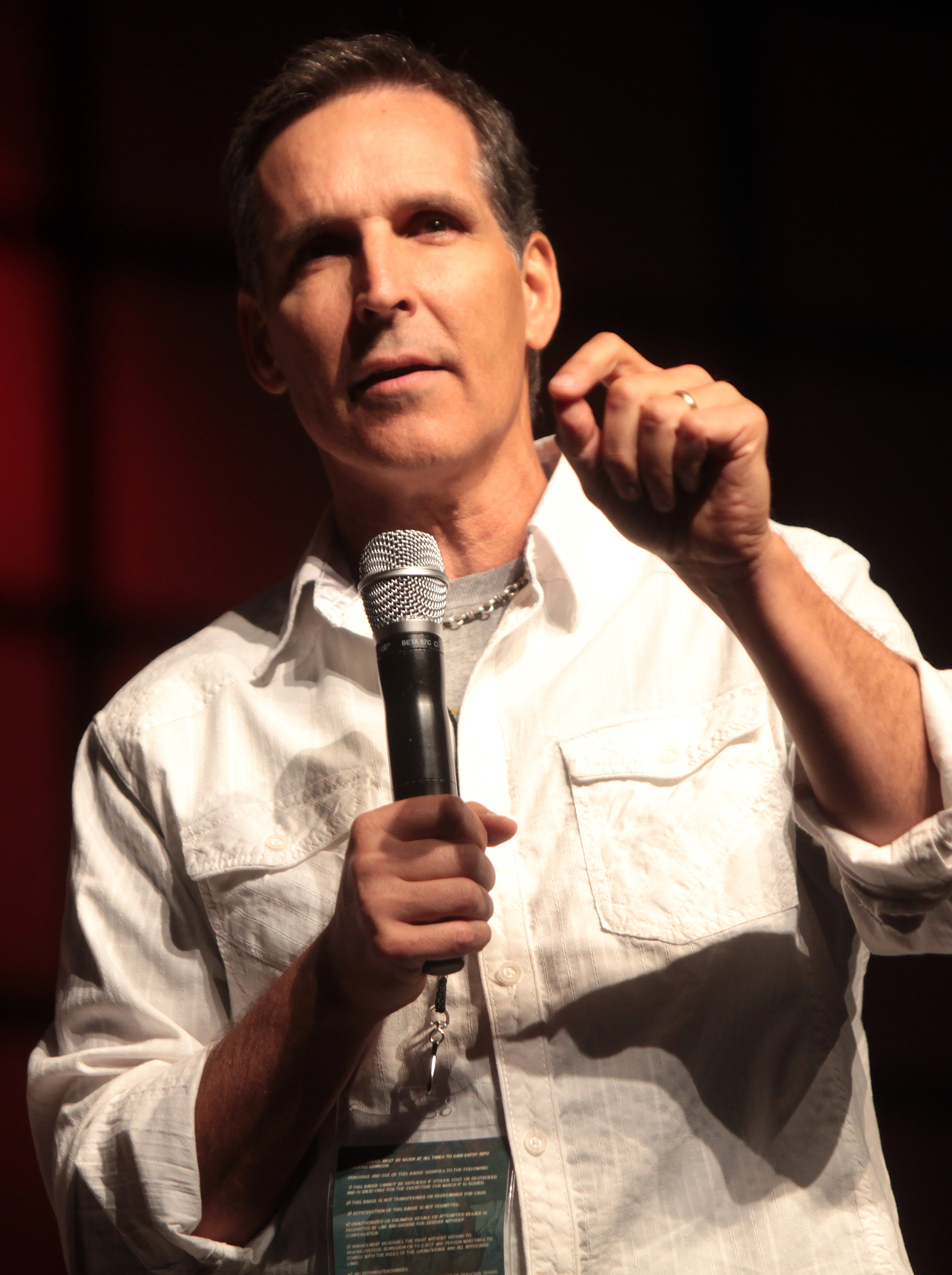
Todd McFarlane felt that Marilyn Manson "epitomizes" Spawn.

Marilyn Manson's eponymous vocalist told the Phoenix New Times that he wrote "Long Hard Road Out of Hell" "while on the road." He said that the song "changes someone's singing and writing at the same time, the rhythm of your vocal." Though it was not written for the film, the song was released on the soundtrack album for Spawn (1997), a film based on the comic book character of the same name; the soundtrack was curated by Happy Walters. Todd McFarlane, the creator of Spawn, told Billboard: "If any artist epitomizes my anti-hero Spawn, it's Marilyn Manson."

Similar to the Judgment Night soundtrack, another Walters project which featured a fusion of hip hop music and rock music, the Spawn soundtrack consisted of collaborations between hard rock or heavy metal bands and electronic music acts. "Long Hard Road Out of Hell" features backing vocals from Kelli Ali, the front-woman of British trip hop band Sneaker Pimps. Neither Ali or her band-mate Liam Howe felt that the rock bands featured on the soundtrack were very good, but thought that collaborating with one of the bands would give them the chance to, in Howe's words, "polish a turd." Manson would recall that while recording the song, "The guitar player of the Sneaker Pimps had just got hit in the foreskin and he told me about it, which is a dumb as fuck thing to do, because the first thing I did was hit him in the dick, and I'm sure that probably added to the tension in the room."

The two bands became engaged in a brief dispute soon after the song's release. Ali complained that the Sneaker Pimps were not present during the song's final mixing, and that they were never issued a master tape. She went on to call the song "crap." Manson responded by calling the Sneaker Pimps' involvement "a bit of a favor, in a sense, because we had already written the song, and I was interested in finding a girl to sing back-up vocals on it, and [they] were asking to be involved. I wasn't that familiar with them. I thought the girl's voice was great. When we worked on the song, I think they were a little upset because there wasn't much for them to do. The song was already done." He also refuted claims that the Sneaker Pimps were never issued with a master recording, suggesting that they had created a remix for the song, but had refused permission for it to appear on the single when they were informed it would appear as a b-side, instead of being released as the main single version.

"Long Hard Road Out of Hell" was released as a single alongside its instrumental, a remix of the song called the "Critter Remix" and the instrumental mix of "Kick the PA" (1997) by Korn and the Dust Brothers. Manson has called "Long Hard Road Out of Hell" "one of my favorites". The track shares its title with Manson's autobiography, The Long Hard Road Out of Hell (1998), and was included on the band's greatest hits album, Lest We Forget: The Best Of (2004).

== Composition and style ==
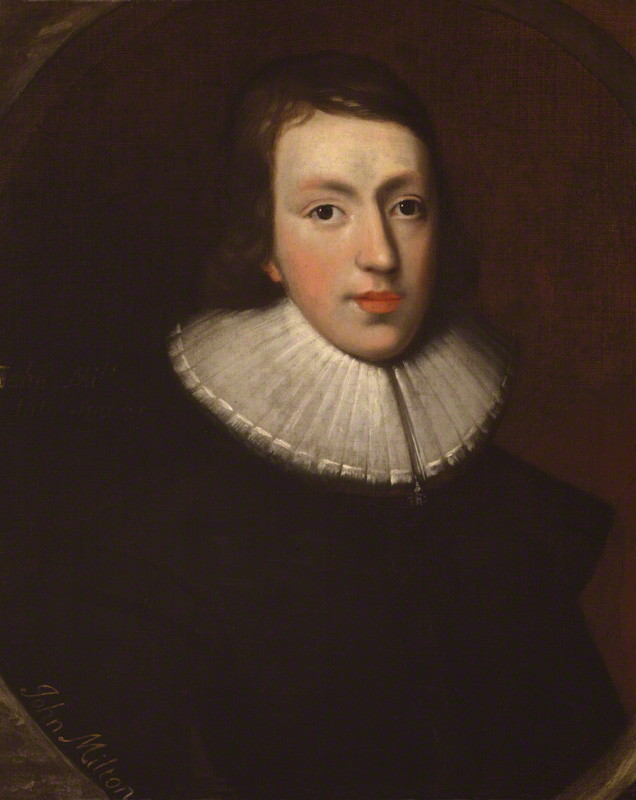
The song's title references Paradise Lost (1667) by John Milton.

"Long Hard Road Out of Hell"
Single version, as it appeared on Lest We Forget: The Best Of (2004)

"Long Hard Road Out of Hell" was written by Marilyn Manson, Twiggy Ramirez, and produced by Manson with Sean Beavan. The track is an arena rock and gothic rock song with a length of four minutes and twenty-one seconds. The title of the song is a reference to John Milton's epic poem Paradise Lost (1667), wherein Satan says: "long is the way/ And hard, that out of Hell leads up to light." The song's lyrics are about self-loathing.

According to A.A. Dowd of The A.V. Club, "Long Hard Road Out of Hell" resembles the music of Marilyn Manson, particularly songs from Antichrist Superstar (1996), far more than the music of the Sneaker Pimps, though its "clicking beat" and background vocals do separate the track from Marilyn Manson's usual shock rock. Dowd also found the song reminiscent of the kind of music played at Ozzfest. Alec Chillingworth of Metal Hammer saw the track as similar to the singles from Antichrist Superstar only more subdued, in the vein of the band's subsequent album Mechanical Animals (1998).

PopMatters's Lance Teegarden felt that the tracks' "layered buzzsaw guitar riffs" and Manson's shout-like vocal performance on the chorus made "Long Hard Road Out of Hell" sound like "Rock Is Dead" (1998) and "The Love Song" (2000). Dowd also noted that the lyrics of the song could be seen as referring to the life of the film's title character – an assassin who is murdered, brought back to life, and given super-powers through a Faustian bargain – as Spawn's "road out of hell [was] long and hard". Dowd viewed the track as one of the few songs on the soundtrack which "feel[s] specifically catered...to the Spawn mythos."

== Critical reception ==
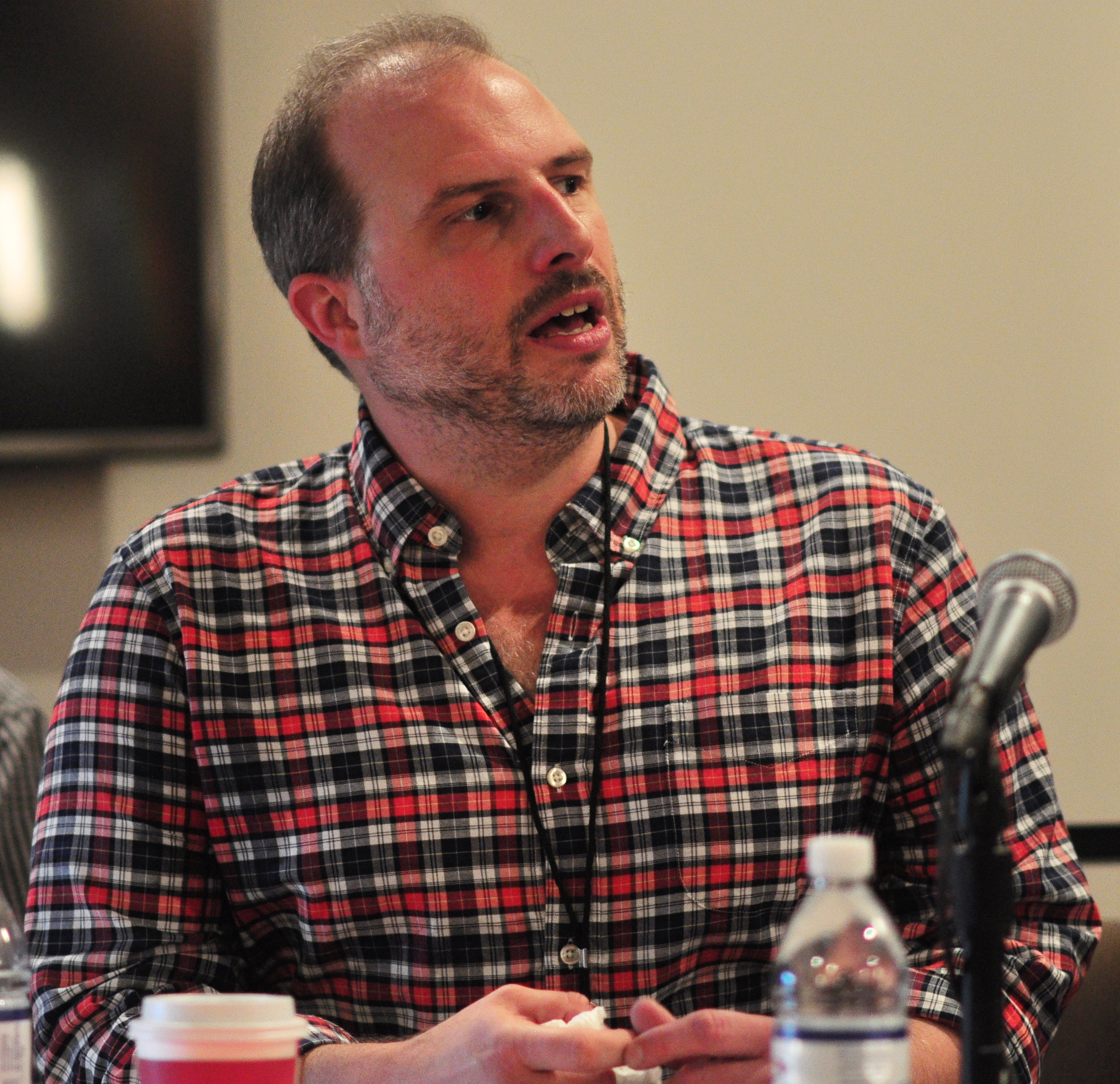
Stephen Thomas Erlewine praised "Long Hard Road Out of Hell".

In his review of Lest We Forget: The Best Of, The Chicago Maroon's Matt Zakosek wrote that "every time you're ready to write him off as the obligatory recording artist of the moment to piss off the religious right, Manson comes out of left field with a surprisingly heartfelt, poetic track like 'The Reflecting God' or 'Long Hard Road Out of Hell.'" Jim Louvau of the Phoenix New Times deemed it one of his favorite songs by the band, alongside "Get Your Gunn" (1994). Chillingworth of Metal Hammer ranked the song sixth on his list of "The 10 most underrated Marilyn Manson songs", saying "'Long Hard Road Out Of Hell' is more than your standard Manson banger. It served as a weird body of water in which Manson tested some of his tricks". Stephen Thomas Erlewine of AllMusic praised the song for being "a good bridge between the goth-industrial Antichrist Superstar and the electronically tweaked glam of Mechanical Animals."

MetalSucks' Axl Rosenberg said that "Long Hard Road Out of Hell" is "fine" and "basically sounds like Antichrist Superstar-era Manson with female backing vocals." Rosenberg found the track superior to other cuts from Spawn: The Album such as the DJ Spooky remix of Metallica's "For Whom the Bell Tolls" (1985) and "Satan" (1998) by Kirk Hammett and Orbital. Dowd of The A.V. Club said that, while he initially cared for the song, it "is basically just a Manson anthem with some very casual bells and whistles attached". Teegarden of PopMatters said that the track "adhere[s] to standard-issue, industrial shock-rock formulas" and fails to distinguish itself from other Marilyn Manson songs. Thrillist's Dan Jackson did not see "Long Hard Road Out of Hell" as one of Spawn: The Album's "standout tracks".

== Music video ==
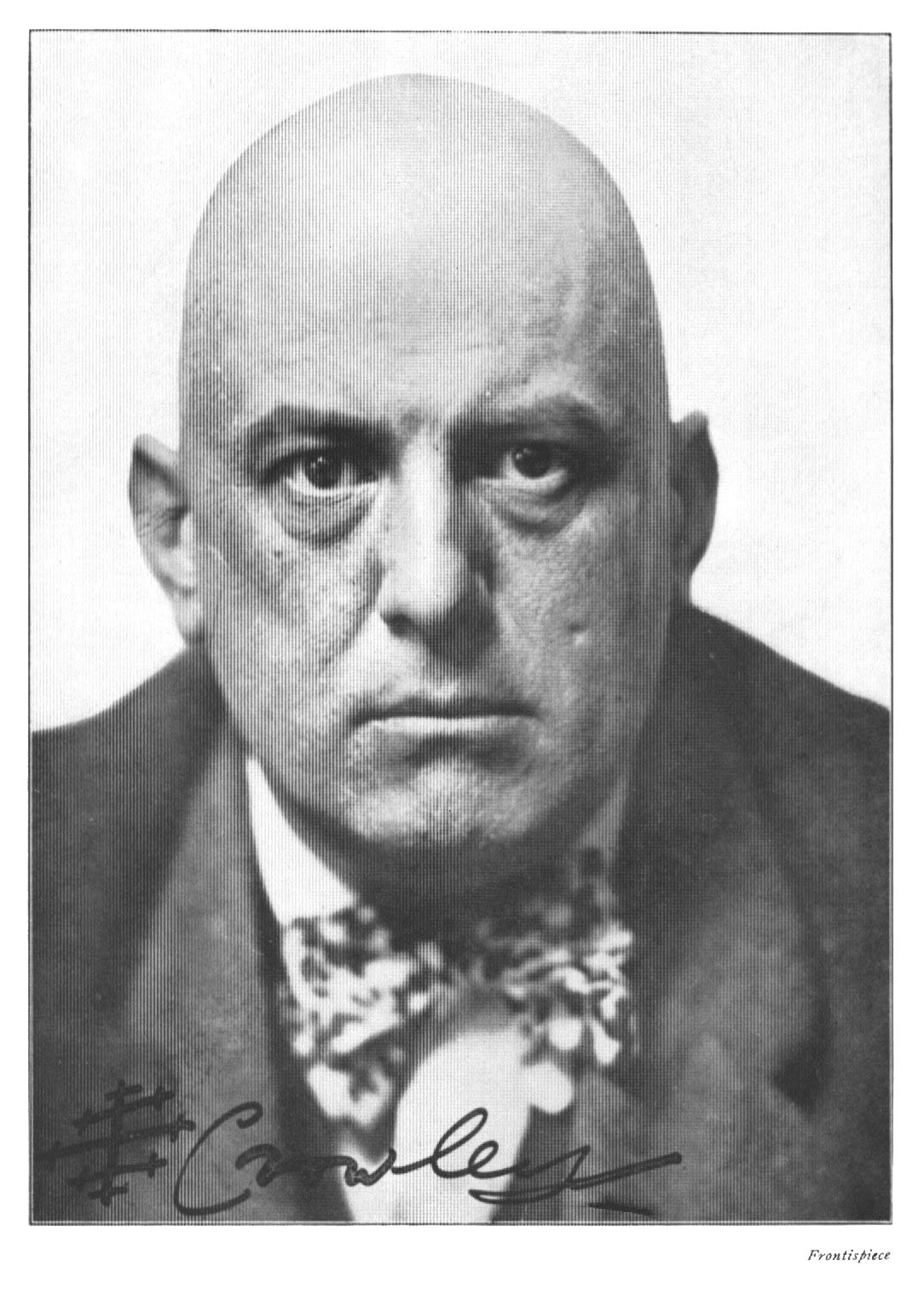
The clip has an Aleister Crowley-lookalike.

MTV News reported in 1997 that the Sneaker Pimps would not be involved in the song's music video. Manson initially approached Jonathan Glazer to direct the video and asked him to watch David Lynch's Lost Highway (1997) for inspiration. Glazer watched the film's opening credits, which feature images of a "road rushing beneath the camera" before falling asleep. As the film's opening credits had entered his mind, Glazer proposed that the video center on a man being chased down a dark, desolate road by an old car. Manson was unimpressed by this idea and decided not to use it; Glazer would use his rejected concept for his video for "Karma Police" (1997) by Radiohead. Upon seeing the "Karma Police" video for the first time, Manson was reportedly upset.

The music video for the song was directed by Matthew Rolston, and was filmed at the site of Robert F. Kennedy's assassination, the Ambassador Hotel in Los Angeles. The video features examples of tableaux vivants, images composed of people holding poses. It also features perverted Christian iconography, with the Virgin Mary depicted as being soaked in blood. In the clip, Manson is androgynous, and is shown wearing a dress and posing like a pin-up model. A group of models who strike sexualized poses in the clip initially appear to be female, but are revealed to be male. One of the models transforms into a figure who resembles Aleister Crowley, a Victorian era occultist whose writings have influenced Manson. According to Mike Rampton of Kerrang!, the video got little airplay on television due to contemporary attitudes toward gender and blasphemy. Manson has said that he likes the video because "it's one part sexy and one part dark."

The video was featured in the 1997 MTV special "Beavis and Butt-Head Do Thanksgiving".

=== Reception ===
Jonathan Barkan of Bloody Disgusting opined: "The video, which plays out almost like a dream, is an absolute visual treat. It's incredibly polished and shiny, makes beautiful use of color, and strongly challenges gender norms". Noisecreep's Chris Ford ranked the clip sixth on his list of the "10 Best Marilyn Manson Videos", adding that its use of tableaux vivants is "especially effective". Writing for Noisey, Alexandra Serio wrote that the depiction of the Virgin Mary in the clip is part of the band's history of "pissing off Jesus Christ". In Kerrang!, Mike Rampton praised Manson's "extraordinarily beautiful" hair in the video, adding "Clad in the cymbal-like bustier of an ectomorphic Brunhilde or an Amanda Lepore-esque striking sexual Valkyrie, his glorious locks are a sight to behold. Or maybe it's a wig."

== Track listing ==
No.	Title	Writer(s)	Length
1.	"Long Hard Road Out of Hell"	Marilyn Manson; Twiggy Ramirez	4:21
2.	"Long Hard Road Out of Hell" (Critter Remix)	Manson; Ramirez	4:16
3.	"Long Hard Road Out of Hell" (Instrumental)	Ramirez	4:48
4.	"Kick the P.A." (by Korn and the Dust Brothers)	Korn; Dust Brothers	3:18

== Personnel ==
Credits adapted from the liner notes of Lest We Forget: The Best Of.

- Marilyn Manson — lead and background vocals, keyboards, production, mixing
- Twiggy Ramirez — acoustic, bass and electric guitars
- Kelli Ali — background vocals
- Sean Beavan — engineering, production, mixing
- Devon Kirkpatrick — assistant engineer
- Tony Giampaolo — assistant engineer

== See also ==
- List of songs recorded by Marilyn Manson
- Paradise Lost in popular culture
