= The Long Hard Road Out of Hell =

Book by Marilyn Manson

- First edition cover
- Author: Marilyn Manson; Neil Strauss
- Language: English
- Genre: Autobiography
- Publisher: ReganBooks (HarperCollins)
- Publication date: 1998
- Publication place: United States
- Media type: Hardcover, paperback
- Pages: 269
- ISBN: 978-0-06-039258-1
- OCLC: 38417510

The Long Hard Road Out of Hell is the autobiography of Marilyn Manson, leader of the American rock band of the same name. The book was released on February 14, 1998, and co-authored by Neil Strauss.

== Summary ==
Sometimes I thought about people's feelings but most of the time I thought that, for the sake of entertainment, brutal honesty was best [...] I wrote it without describing how I felt, because a lot of the times I wasn't feeling anything. I also thought if I described the events well enough, with a lot of detail and sarcasm, then people would feel how I felt and I wouldn't have to tell them. They'd feel it for themselves.

— Marilyn Manson

The book follows Manson's life from when he was a child, born Brian Hugh Warner, until the events of the band's controversial Dead to the World Tour. It also details his grandfather's sexual fetishes (including bestiality and sadomasochism) to the forming of Marilyn Manson and the Spooky Kids, to the recording of Antichrist Superstar. Its last pages are the journal of the band's touring, documenting backstage events and people's reactions. The book includes many references to his life of drugs, sex and dysfunctional relationships which he attributes as causal to his current status quo. It also features his journalism works, including an article about a dominatrix he interviewed for 25th Parallel.

The autobiography goes in-depth into the break-ups in the band's history. It follows several members through becoming friends and musicians with the band to angry and sometimes bitter leavings, some band members detested being fired so badly that lawsuits have been filed against Manson by his own crew members.

Along with the book are numerous pictures, some of which are familiar to long-time Manson fans, with the center pages including everything from the Slasher Girls to Manson performing "Antichrist Superstar" with a Bible in his hand. The book incorporates illustrations from a public domain edition of Gray's Anatomy, originally drawn by Henry Vandyke Carter. For example, the ribcage in the cover image (which also appears in the liner note artwork for Antichrist Superstar) is taken from Gray's Figure 115. Also scattered throughout the pages are documents of such things as girlfriends, legal documents of claims made by the American Family Association about his shows that were proven to be false, and band landmarks, to the rarer, such as Manson with Anton LaVey.

== Background and writing ==
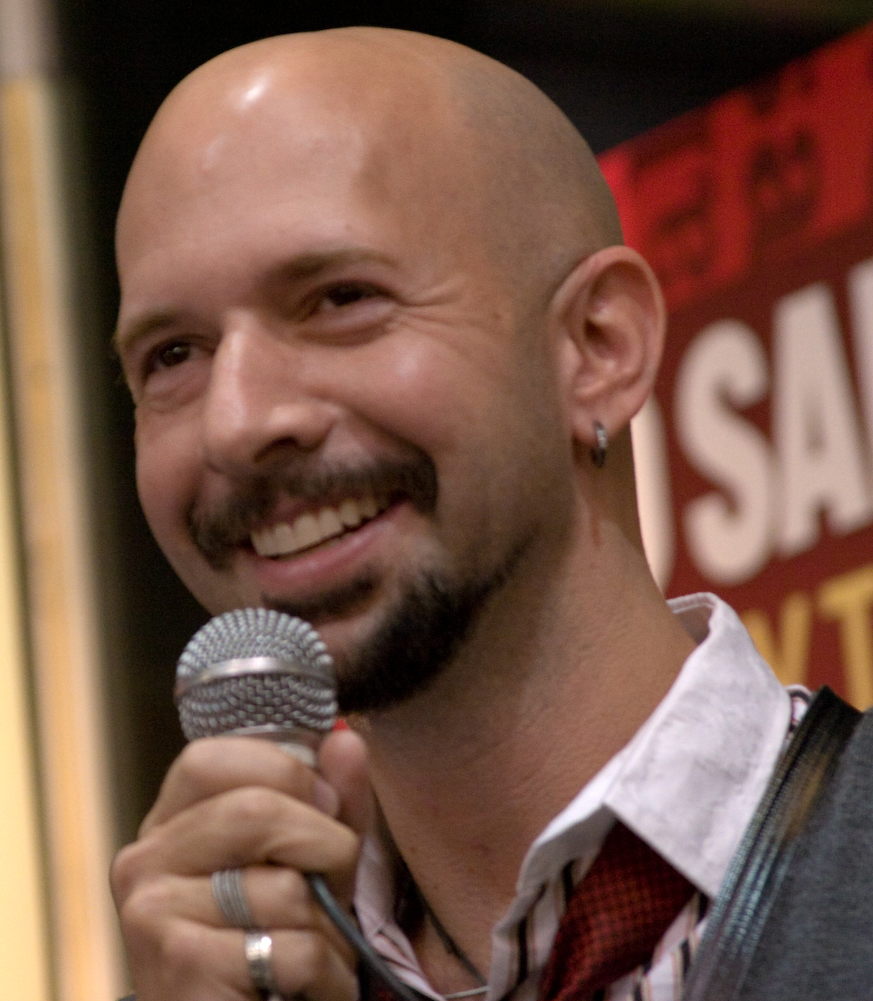
Neil Strauss, co-author of the book

Neil Strauss, a rock critic and reporter for The New York Times, met Marilyn Manson through his work for Spin and Rolling Stone. Strauss initially perceived Manson as a "phony" who had gotten on the gothic rock bandwagon very late; he later came to see Manson as a "really interesting, really intelligent artist" with many talents. He went to talk to Manson at a Holiday Inn in Fort Lauderdale, Florida. Manson asked Strauss to join him in a hot tub, commenting "This is going to be an important piece of press." Strauss wrote a cover story about Manson for Rolling Stone, which in the view of the Chicago Reader's Jim DeRogatis "legitimized Manson's emergence as one of the most notorious entertainers of the 90s and an enthusiastic bogeyman for the right". Following the publication of the article, Strauss became Manson's business partner. Later, Manson and Strauss got a deal to write the singer's autobiography for ReganBooks, an imprint of HarperCollins founded by Judith Regan, who was behind Howard Stern's Private Parts (1997). The autobiography shares its title with the Marilyn Manson song "Long Hard Road Out of Hell" (1997) and features an introduction written by film director David Lynch; Manson had previously contributed two songs to the soundtrack of Lynch's film Lost Highway (1997) and would later collaborate with the director on a coffee table book titled Genealogies of Pain (2011).

== Promotion ==
On February 21, 1998, Manson held a two-hour in-store book signing at the San Francisco Virgin Megastore. The event was attended by an estimated 700 fans.

== Critical reception ==
Contemporary reviews of The Long Hard Road Out of Hell were mixed. In The Austin Chronicle, Marc Savlov hailed the book as "a terrific rock & roll saga in the epic vein....Like Manson's gooney-harsh music and Danzig-on-goofdust lyrics, the book sucks you in and never lets you go until the final appendices are past." Tucson Weekly's James DiGiovanna found the book "quite good" and praised its opening chapters for insightfully "illustrating the mesmerizing and disquieting effect such images can have on the young. This alone gives the book interest far beyond its status as a celebrity's story." Jason Morgan of The Washington Post said that the book's prose is "surprisingly polished and even beautiful on occasion," it sometimes succumbs to "lush writerly excess" reminiscent of William Faulkner's work. SF Weekly said that "The Long Hard Road Out of Hell isn't a bad read at all" but it left "essential ground...uncovered." He found the book's narrative reminiscent of both Franz Kafka's The Metamorphosis (1915) and F. Scott Fitzgerald's The Great Gatsby (1925). In Entertainment Weekly, Rob Brunner never explained why Manson grew into the man that he did and featured numerous boring passages about debauchery. People said that the "tell-too-much autobio reveals that beneath the weird makeup, noisy music and parent-enraging act beats the heart of...a boring guy from Ohio."

Retrospective reviews were more positive. Greg Burk of LA Weekly said that the book stood as "the most self-abasing and funny piece of rock mythology ever written." Emily Barker of NME deemed The Long Hard Road Out of Hell one of the "juiciest" rock star memoirs of all time and praised it for being revealing. Rolling Stone called the book "engrossing" while Grantland's Steven Hyden said that it is Manson's "most interesting work." Hyden added "One of the great 'tawdry' rock books, The Long Hard Road reads like an Oliver Stone adaptation of Hammer of the Gods, taking all the tropes of rock exposés — the excessive drug use, the gross-out groupie debauchery, the studio-bound infighting — and pushing them to bizarre, sickening, and compulsively readable extremes." Craig Hlavaty said that the book is one of the greatest "Rock Tell-All Autobiographies" of all time. In an article describing Manson as a reactionary comparable to Ronald Reagan and Margaret Thatcher, J. R. Moores of Drowned in Sound said that "The Long Hard Road Out of Hell is Ayn Rand for people with pentagram thumb-rings."

Craig Hlavaty of the Houston Press questioned whether the book was entirely factual, as did SF Weekly.
