= Paradise Lost in popular culture =

Paradise Lost has had a profound impact on writers, artists and illustrators, and, in the twentieth century, filmmakers.

== In literature ==
The cover to the 2017 book Essays in Anarchism and Religion features Paradise Lost engravings by Gustave Doré

- In addition to printing an illustrated edition of the poem, much of the mystic poetry of William Blake is a direct response to or rewriting of Paradise Lost. Blake emphasized the rebellious, satanic elements of the epic; the repressive character Urizen in the Four Zoas is a tyrannical version of Milton's God. In addition to his famous quip in The Marriage of Heaven and Hell about Milton belonging to the devil's party, Blake wrote Milton: a Poem which has Milton, like Satan, rejecting a life in Heaven.
- Paradise Lost influenced Mary Shelley when she wrote her novel Frankenstein. Shelley uses a quote from Book X of Paradise Lost on the epigram page of her novel and Paradise Lost is one of three books Frankenstein's monster finds; this, therefore, influences his psychological growth. The concept of the "Fallen Angel," an epithet of Satan, is used to both describe the protagonist, Victor, and to describe his monster.
- Poet Percy Bysshe Shelley specifically notes in the preface to his lyrical drama Prometheus Unbound that he constructed his character Prometheus in part as an attempt to revise Milton's Satan.
- In H.P. Lovecraft's short story Dagon published in 1919, the unnamed narrator finds himself stranded in "a slimy expanse of hellish black mire which extended about [him]", and upon reaching an immeasurable canyon, he relates that "Through my terror ran curious reminiscences of Paradise Lost, and of Satan’s hideous climb through the unfashioned realms of darkness."
- In C. S. Lewis' novel The Great Divorce the narrator meets writer George MacDonald in heaven, who uses the quote "Better to reign in Hell than serve in Heav'n" as answer to the narrator's questions about heaven and hell.
- Frederick Buechner's debut novel, A Long Day's Dying, takes its title from Book 10 of Paradise Lost.
- John Steinbeck's novel In Dubious Battle takes its title from Book 1 of Paradise Lost.
- In his controversial novel The Satanic Verses, Salman Rushdie adapts major motifs and plot elements from Paradise Lost, such as a "fall" and subsequent transformation.
- The epic was also one of the prime inspirations for Philip Pullman's trilogy of novels His Dark Materials (the title itself a quotation from Book II of Paradise Lost). In Pullman's introduction, he modifies Blake's line to quip that he himself "is of the Devil's party and does know it."
- Libba Bray uses a quote from Paradise Lost to name the second book of her trilogy, Rebel Angels, quoting from it "To reign is worth ambition though in Hell: Better to reign in Hell than serve in Heav'n."
- In his Sandman comics/graphic novels series, Neil Gaiman uses Lucifer as a character, most notably in the Season of Mists arc/collection, and makes reference to the poem, having Lucifer openly quote Milton.
- Jacqueline Carey's epic fantasy Banewreaker was influenced by tragic fiction and opens with a quote from Paradise Lost.
- The Day After Judgment by James Blish ends with Satan making a long speech in Miltonic blank verse.
- John Collier's Paradise Lost: Screenplay for Cinema of the Mind. was published in 1973.
- In 1976, British pianist, cabaret performer, songwriter, and actor Billy Milton published his autobiography, Milton's Paradise Mislaid.
- In 1994, American author Joseph Lanzara wrote Paradise Lost: The Novel based upon the epic poem.
- In Jón Kalman Stefánsson's novel Heaven and Hell the character Barthur is enamored of the poem, and suffers tragic consequences when he does not pay attention to gathering his gear for a fishing job, instead dwelling on one passage from the poem. Various snippets from the poem are quoted with admiration during the course of the narrative. The poem was first published in Icelandic in 1828, translated by Jon Thorlakson.
- John Keats's Hyperion is influenced by Paradise Lost.
- Donna Tartt's The Secret History makes mention of Paradise Lost, with the character Henry Winter taking on the task of translating the epic into ancient Greek.
- In Cassandra Clare's young-adult fantasy series The Mortal Instruments, one of the main antagonists, Valentine Morgenstern, was inspired by Milton's Lucifer. Valentine can be seen quoting Milton at various times.
- Lord Byron alludes to Milton in his works.
- In the web-based collaborative fiction project the SCP Foundation, an organization known as the Chaos Insurgency uses a quote from Paradise Lost as their motto: "Should intermittent vengeance arm again his red right hand to plague us?"
- In 2014, Pablo Auladell adapted Paradise Lost into a graphic novel published by Pegasus Books.
- Rafael Nicolás's 2022/3 novel Angels Before Man is a queer retelling of the fall of Lucifer, loosely based on Paradise Lost.

== In music ==
- The libretto for John Christopher Smith's oratorio Paradise Lost (1760) was by Benjamin Stillingfleet after Milton.
- Paradise Lost was, apart from straight quotations of biblical texts, the basis on which the libretto for Joseph Haydn's oratorio Die Schöpfung (The Creation, 1798) was built, by, among others, Baron van Swieten.
- In 1878 the oratorio Le paradis perdu by the composer Théodore Dubois on a libretto by Alfred-Édouard Blau was performed for the first time at the Théatre Lyrique du Châtelet in Paris.
- In 1895, the English composer Clement Harris composed a symphonic poem titled Paradise Lost based on Milton's poem.
- In the late 1970s, the Polish composer Krzysztof Penderecki wrote an opera based on Paradise Lost.
- The American choral and orchestral composer Eric Whitacre composed an "Electronica Opera" entitled Paradise Lost: Shadows and Wings, inspired by this text.
- A musical adaptation of Paradise Lost was written by Ben Birney and Rob Seitelman and was performed in New York City in March 2006. This sung-through musical augmented the main story of Paradise Lost with the addition of the character 'Sophia' who represented the feminine divine. It explored her relationship to the events of the Milton poem and offered explanation as to her virtual elimination from Canonic text.
- The British metal band Cradle of Filth was inspired by Paradise Lost and wrote the concept album Damnation and a Day which takes place over the fall and eventual rise of Lucifer.
- The English gothic metal band Paradise Lost is named after the poem.
- Norwegian metal band Dimmu Borgir quote Paradise Lost in the song "Architecture of a Genocidal Nature" in their album Puritanical Euphoric Misanthropia, released in 2001.
- American progressive metal band Symphony X's seventh album is titled Paradise Lost. It is a musical adaptation of the poem's story, and includes a song also titled "Paradise Lost".
- The Swedish metal band Morgana Lefay's song "Paradise Lost" from their album The Secret Doctrine is based upon the poem.
- The Austrian/French gothic band Elend's Officium Tenebrarum trilogy is based upon Paradise Lost.
- Australian underground progressive metal band Saeturnum wrote their song "Eruption" based around the fall of Lucifer and the temptation of man, heavily inspired by Milton's Paradise Lost.
- German power metal band Blind Guardian based the song "Control the Divine" from the album At the Edge of Time on the poem.
- The band Hollywood Undead based a song on the poem, "Paradise Lost", as it is member Johnny 3 Tears's favorite poem/book. Their song "S.C.A.V.A." also appears to be based on the poem.
- Dr Chair's 2001 album Witter and Beard has a track entitled "Paradise Lost".
- Lift to Experience's song "When We Shall Touch" consists largely of a reading from "Paradise Lost", at the point where Adam tells Michael he submits to God's will and will leave the Garden of the Eden despite his dismay.
- Nick Cave's songs "Song of Joy" and "Red Right Hand", mention Paradise Lost and quotes from it.
- In the aptly named Paradise Lost album by Cirith Ungol, the last three songs (Chaos Rising, Fallen Idols and Paradise Lost) are about the poem.
- Rap artist Eminem used pictures and transcripts from Paradise Lost in his music video for "Rap God".
- The opening six songs from Glenn Danzig's classical album Black Aria act as a soundtrack to Paradise Lost.
- Heavy metal band Carnal Agony based their tracks "Rebel's Lament" and "Rebellion" from the album Preludes & Nocturnes on the poem.
- "Paradise Lost (You’re the Reason Why)" is a song on the 2002 album Cammell Laird Social Club by the band Half Man Half Biscuit. It is self-quoted in the song "Lord Hereford's Knob" on their 2008 album CSI:Ambleside.
- 'The Argument' by Grant Hart released in 2013 based on the poem.
- Paradise Lost serves as inspiration for the lyrical content of David Gilmour's latest solo album, Rattle That Lock (2015). The deluxe edition of the album even comes with a hardback 48-page copy of Book II of the poem.
- The song "Paradise Lost" by Korean singer Gain is heavily influenced by the epic poem. The music video also depicts the singer as Eve and the Korean version of Eve, Hawwah, as well as the snake. There is a contemporary dance depicting the snake also present in the video.
- The Red Hot Chili Peppers' music video "Otherside" references Lucifer's fall from the heavens.
- The 10cc song "The Dean and I" mentions the title in the lyrics.
- The Style Council song "Come to Milton Keynes" mentions the title in the lyrics.
- The Marillion song "WaterHole (Expresso Bongo)" mentions the title in the lyrics.
- The title of "Long Hard Road Out of Hell" (1997) by Marilyn Manson and the Sneaker Pimps is derived from a line of the poem.
- Paradise Lost is the title of Delta Heavy's debut studio album (2016).
- The song "Darkness Visible" from the 2018 Mumford & Sons album Delta quotes from the poem.
- The Used released a song titled "Paradise Lost, a poem by John Milton", a direct reference to the poem.
- The Swedish metal band Ghost's 2022 song "Kaisarion" references Paradise Lost with, "When a Paradise is Lost go straight to Hell"
- "Paradise Lost" is the name of the 2022 Boston Crusaders Drum and Bugle Corps show, following the poem's story through musical selections and marching visuals.
- The song "Eve & Paradise Lost" from the 2024 Bastille album "&" directly references the poem in its title and lyrics.

== In art ==
- UC San Diego's famous "snake path" (part of the Stuart Art Collection) was inspired by Paradise Lost. Leading from the university's library, the path symbolizes the conflict between innocence and knowledge.
- Graba' made a cycle of 19 jewels "Paradise Lost" in 2007 exhibited in the Harmagedon Gallery in Courtrai, Belgium.
- A monument to the Fallen Angel inspired by Milton can be seen at the Retiro Park in Madrid.
- Raqib Shaw’s introspective painting titled Paradise Lost is on exhibit at the Art Institute of Chicago.

== In film ==
- The 1997 film The Devil's Advocate makes references to the poem and its author. For example, the main antagonist, John Milton, is named after the author, and in the finale of the film the main protagonist, Kevin Lomax makes a quotation: "'Better to reign in Hell, than to serve in Heaven,' is that it?"
- The first book of the Philip Pullman's trilogy of novels His Dark Materials has been made into a 2007 film, The Golden Compass. However, most of the Christian symbolism of the books has been stripped, thus the inspiration from Paradise Lost has become less pronounced.
- Paradise Lost is referenced in a scene from the 1978 film Animal House, when Professor Jennings vainly attempts to interest his freshman English class in the themes of the poem, particularly those involving Satan. Not only does his class express no interest in either the poem or what the professor has to say about it, but in an ironical moment, the professor himself admits that he finds Milton agonizing to read as well as to teach, which complements his admission later in the film that he is only in the teaching business "to make ends meet until (he) can finish his novel."
- In the 1995 film Se7en, Detective Somerset, the more cerebral of the two protagonist detectives, suspects that Paradise Lost and other works of the early medieval Canon may have inspired the murders that are the centerpiece of the film's plot.
- The 2003 film Kamen Rider 555: Paradise Lost references the poem by having Faiz being a savior, who will come back to life and bring peace to the world.
- T-Bird, a character from the 1994 thriller film The Crow reads the line from an actual antique copy of the book, "Abashed the devil stood, and felt how awful goodness is."
- Paradise Lost was scheduled to be made into an action film in 2012, directed by Alex Proyas and slated for release sometime in 2013. Bradley Cooper was cast as Lucifer in July, 2011 and Benjamin Walker was cast as Michael in August. Djimon Hounsou joined the cast as Abdiel and Casey Affleck as Gabriel. Filming was originally scheduled to shoot in Sydney, Australia in January 2012, but production was put on hold in December 2011. The film however was scrapped in early February 2012.
- In the 2000 film Animal Factory, Willem Dafoe's character Earl quotes Satan, saying "This is my prison, after all." The last line of the film is "Better to reign in hell than serve in heaven, right?"
- In April Fool's Day (1986 film), Deborah Goodrich's character is introduced while she is reading Paradise Lost. She laments that it is largely unread by most people in contemporary times.
- Ridley Scott's 2017 film Alien: Covenant was previously titled Alien: Paradise Lost. The android David^{8} quotes the book and is similar to Lucifer.
- Paradise Lost was referenced by the Pet Shop Boys in their film It Couldn't Happen Here.
- In the 2018 film The Forgiven, Eric Bana (playing Blomfeld) quotes the line "All is not lost; the unconquerable Will, and study of revenge, immortal hate, and courage never to submit or yield." Forest Whitaker (playing Desmond Tutu) also quotes the line "The mind is its own place, and in itself can make a heaven of hell, a hell of heaven."
- In Tom Tykwer's 1998 film, Run Lola Run, one of the main characters makes a call from a phone booth in Berlin. In an overhead shot at 00:10:10, a paperback copy of Paradise Lost can be seen in the phone booth.
- In the 1982 film Star Trek II: The Wrath of Khan, Paradise Lost can be seen on Khan's bookshelf alongside various other works such as Moby-Dick, which represent aspects of the film's plot, such as Khan's fall into a hellish environment and obsession with fighting Captain Kirk.
- In the 2019 film Ready or Not, a maid reads the lines from the first book "Here we may reign secure, and in my choyce; To reign is worth ambition" to two Le Domas kids before sleep.
- Greta Gerwig was influenced by the poem while writing the screenplay for Barbie.
- In 2026, film director Roger Avary started a film project using Generative AI for the difficult scenery of the novel.

== On radio ==
A 41 15-minute episode production by Adrian Mitchell was broadcast in 1992 on BBC Radio 4, with Denis Quilley as Milton, Ian McDiarmid as Satan, Linus Roache as Adam, Robert Glenister as Christ, Matthew Morgan as Beelzebub, Mark Straker as Michael and Federay Holmes as Eve. This production was re-broadcast in 2010 on BBC Radio 7.

A 12-part reading by Anton Lesser was broadcast on BBC Radio 3 from 22 December 2008 to 2 January 2009.

A two-part adaptation by Michael Symmons Roberts was broadcast on BBC Radio 4 on 24 and 25 March 2018, with Ian McKellen as Milton, Frances Barber as Elizabeth, Simon Russell Beale as Satan, Jonathan Keeble as Beelzebub and Russell Dixon as God.

== In theatre ==
Paradise Lost was adapted for the stage by The Vista Hills Theatre Troupe and performed as a two-act play, November 11 and 12, 2011, in El Paso, Texas.

Paradise Lost was adapted into a musical by Sight and Sound Theaters in 2007 - 2008. The show combines elements from both Genesis (the creation of the world as well as man, the betrayal from God and Adam and Eve's Exile, and the entirety of Cain and Abel) and Paradise Lost, as well as original ideas.

Paradise Lost was performed on stage in Stratford Festival in 2018 starting Lucy Peacock as the devil and Amelia Sargisson as Eve.

== In video games ==
- In 1991, Paradise Lost was adapted as an arcade video game for the Amiga computers. It was developed and commercially released by Silicon Twins in Turkey.
- In DOOM the player travels to hell in order to combat a demon invasion. Level E3M3 is titled "Pandemonium".
- In both games Final Fantasy II and Final Fantasy IX, one of the last levels is a castle taken to the Earth by the main antagonist directly from hell, called "Pandaemonium".
- In Final Fantasy XIV: Endwalker, Pandaemonium is featured as a location and a series of 12 eight-man raids that take place in that location.
- The line, "It Is Better To Reign In Hell Than To Serve In Heaven" was quoted in one of three possible endings in the philosophically inclined game Deus Ex. The use of the quote signifies the player's decision was to rule the world with the Illuminati in one possible ending.
- In Sam & Max Hit the Road, Sam will quote the line "It is better to reign in hell than to serve in heaven" when observing the scenery in the Tunnel of Love. Max follows up his quote with the line "Heaven is a place where nothing ever happens", the chorus from the Talking Heads song "Heaven".
- The subtitle of Mega Man X8 is Paradise Lost, and the story of the game has elements of the Christian religion; Lumine and Sigma have angelic (more specifically, seraphic) and demonic elements; the main project, an elevator that goes to the moon, is called the Jakob project after Jacob's Ladder; and Lumine's final attack is even called Paradise Lost.
- In Fallout 3, the player character can actually read Paradise Lost, which results in a permanent Speech skill bonus. In addition, several excerpts can be found on a computer terminal in Underworld.
- In Darksiders, the phrase "Would you serve in Heaven, or rule in Hell?" is mentioned, symbolizing the decision that Abbadon, and later War, make. These two are direct opposites, with Abbadon choosing to betray Heaven in favor of Hell.
- In Dota 2 the hero Doom Bringer's backstory involved him being cast out of the realm beyond light; the place where he crashed in the desert was called Paradise Lost.
- In the game Marvel: Avengers Alliance the characters Beast and Pestilence have an ability called Paradise Lost.
- In Max Payne 2: The Fall of Max Payne, the main antagonist quotes "It is better to reign in Hell than serve in Heaven" before the final confrontation. Paradise Lost is also mentioned as one of the books owned by a devil-worshiping mob boss in the first game.
- In Metal Gear Solid 4: Guns of the Patriots, there is a group called the Paradise Lost Army.
- In The Talos Principle, the player interacts with a character named Milton, exploring philosophical issues regarding consciousness and existence via dialog trees that are accessed through computer terminals, which also contain excerpts of Milton's Paradise Lost.
- In Granblue Fantasy, the summon stone Lucifer and Sandalphon can be summoned to attack with a skill called Paradise Lost. Also, the characters Lucio and Sandalphon (with White Wing buff) shares the same name of their respective Charge Attack.
- In Persona 5, there is a weapon for Joker named Paradise Lost created by itemizing the Persona Satanael, a Persona who represents Satan before he was thrown out of heaven.
- The Pandemonium! game name is based on the location in hell of the poem.
- The 2014 survival game The Long Dark has a story chapter named Paradise Lost, which takes place in the city of Milton.
- A DLC expansion to Postal 2 shares its name with the book.
- In Shin Megami Tensei V, the game's protagonist can be seen reading a special Japanese edition of Paradise Lost.
- In Warhammer 40,000 The Horus Heresy is heavily influenced by Milton. The story of the Emperor's favored sons succumbing to the temptations of Chaos deliberately parallels the fall of Satan in Paradise Lost.
- A 2021 adventure game published by All in! Games was titled Paradise Lost.
- The 2018 Korean management simulation game Lobotomy Corporation named the E.G.O. equipment of the abnormality WhiteNight shares the name of the poem.
- In the Japanese visual novel of the same name, "Paradise Lost", the protagonist finds himself possessed by a demon and then uses its power to unravel the mystery behind the fall of the Empire of Sodom 1000 years earlier, only to find, after much research, the culprit behind it all, the powerful scientist called Satanael Nerose, who wants to create a paradise from the ashes of their rotten and corrupt world.
- In Grand Theft Auto VI, an achievement is named Paradise Lost is given after the end of Chapter 1 of the game, likely a reference to the protagonist couple of the game, Jason and Lucia, returning to a life of crime after a dead drop pickup ends badly.

== In television ==
- "Long is the way and hard that out of hell leads up to light" spoken by Denholm Elliott at the end of Bangkok Hilton (1989) to Hugo Weaving while they wait for Nicole Kidman, to which he asks, "that's Milton isn't it?" and Elliot replies, "Paradise Lost".
- In the Star Trek episode "Space Seed" (1967) the character Khan alludes to Paradise Lost when he is exiled to a primitive planet, implying he would rather rule there than accommodate himself to Captain Kirk's society. Khan asks Kirk if he has read Milton. Kirk nods and says "Yes. I understand." After the exchange, Mr. Scott says "It's a shame for a good Scotsman to admit it, but I'm not up on Milton." Kirk explains that Khan referred to "The statement Lucifer made when he fell into the pit: 'It is better to rule in Hell than serve in Heaven.'" (Mr. Scott need not have admitted to "shame", however, as Milton was English, not Scottish.)
- Inspector Morse, Season 4, Episode 1, "The Infernal Serpent", ends with Morse to Lewis: "The infernal Serpent; he it was, whose guile, stirred up with Envy and Revenge, deceived The Mother of Mankind. Milton, Lewis. Paradise Lost."
- Paradise Lost is an important element to the Season 1, Episode 9, "Planets Aligned" of the Canadian TV Series, Flashpoint as some of the characters mention quotes from it in the episode.
- Paradise Lost comes into play in the third season of Marvel's Agents of S.H.I.E.L.D., with strong references to the book including an episode named after it.
- In the season 3 finale of The Good Place Eleanor makes mention of Pandemonium, stating that Chidi tricked her into reading Paradise Lost by telling her that Satan was "her type."
- Endeavour, Season 3, Episode 2, "Arcadia" concludes with Morse quoting the lines, “The world was all before them, where to choose Their place of rest, and Providence their guide: They, hand in hand, with wandering steps and slow, Through Eden took their solitary way.”
- In Roar, Season 1, Episode 6, "The Woman Who Solved Her Own Murder", character Detective Chris Durst alludes to Paradise Lost when he asks his partner if he'd ever read any Milton, stating "I think you'd like him. Especially Paradise Lost. It's all about Satan, Fall of Man."
