= The Beautiful People (song) =

Single by Marilyn Manson

from the album Antichrist Superstar
- Released: September 22, 1996
- Studio: Nothing (New Orleans, Louisiana)
- Genre: Industrial metal; alternative metal; gothic rock
- Length: 3:45
- Label: Nothing; Interscope
- Composer: Twiggy Ramirez
- Lyricist: Marilyn Manson
- Producers: Trent Reznor; Dave Ogilvie; Marilyn Manson

Marilyn Manson singles chronology
"Sweet Dreams (Are Made of This)" (1995)	"The Beautiful People" (1996)	"Long Hard Road Out of Hell" (1997)

Music video
- "The Beautiful People" on YouTube

"The Beautiful People" is a song by American rock band Marilyn Manson. It was released as the lead single from the band's second studio album, Antichrist Superstar, in September 1996. Classified as industrial metal, the song was written by frontman Marilyn Manson and Twiggy Ramirez, and was produced by Trent Reznor, Dave Ogilvie and Manson.

The title of the song comes from Marylin Bender's 1967 book The Beautiful People, which exposed the world of scandal within the "jet-set" lifestyle of the 1960s, and the culture of beauty as it pertained to fashion and politics. In the context of the album's concept, the song refers to the privileged class of elites whom the titular character, a populist demagogue called Antichrist Superstar, fulminate against. Lyrically, it discusses what Manson refers to as "the culture of beauty".

The single peaked at number 26 on the US Billboard Modern Rock Tracks chart and remains known as one of Marilyn Manson's most famous and most successful original songs; in a 2004 review, Richard Banks of the BBC called the track "still the most impressive" in the band's catalogue, and in 2006 it was ranked at number 28 on VH1's 40 Greatest Metal Songs.

== Background ==
"The Beautiful People" was written in 1994, with lyrics by Marilyn Manson and music by Twiggy Ramirez. The original demo version was written in a hotel room while on tour, and recorded to four-track by Manson, Ramirez, and drummer Ginger Fish. Manson recalled to Kerrang! magazine in May 2005: "It was somewhere in the South, which is ironic. I remember playing the drum beat on the floor and then having my drummer duplicate that on the drum machine. It happened in one day pretty much."

== Composition and lyrics ==
"The Beautiful People"
A sample of "The Beautiful People"

The song is preceded with a few seconds of backwards-guitar feedback and electronic noise. It includes a heavily distorted spoken sample by Tex Watson, declaring "[We would] swoop down on the town. . . [and] kill everyone that wasn't beautiful".

The song is written in drop D tuning, and is built primarily out of power chords based on the notes of a diminished triad. It also incorporates extensive use of guitar distortion, and the use of palm muting creates a highly rhythmic, driving style amplified by a heavy percussion track. The song's characteristic element is its repetitive drum beat: a five-beat common time pattern played on floor toms, with a shuffle note each measure creating a triplet feel.

Sean Beavan, who mixed and co-produced Antichrist Superstar, is credited with "descending horn guitar" on the track. Beavan can be heard playing a repeated descending figure with a brass instrument-like sound using a guitar synthesizer.

Lyrically, it is entwined with the Antichrist Superstar album's overarching theme, a semi-narrative examination of the Nietzschean Übermensch. Within this context, "The Beautiful People" deals explicitly with the destructive manifestation of the Will to Power ("There's no time to discriminate / hate every motherfucker that's in your way"), while also exploring Nietzsche's view of master-slave morality ("It's not your fault that you're always wrong / The weak ones are there to justify the strong"), particularly the concept's connection with Social Darwinism and its relation to various political and economic systems such as capitalism and fascism ("Capitalism has made it this way/Old-fashioned fascism will take it away").

== Versions and releases ==
Fascist imagery, whether blatant or subversive, exists in everything. Rock'n'roll, sports, politics, they all carry an element of it. Totalitarianism fascinates me because I see it everywhere. You are told from birth to death that if you don't participate in various capitalist rituals, ie consumption, good behaviour, religious worship, you won't be accepted, loved or beautiful. That underlying suppression affects you and it's completely ignored ... Look, why do people want to be beautiful? To be loved, accepted, conquer their fear of exclusion. I finally realised after years of not being accepted—why not create your own standard and let other people be accepted or rejected by you? We've reversed the whole idea of the fascism of beauty and replaced it with our own standard. We destroyed it to create a new way.

— Marilyn Manson

In addition to the version on the Antichrist Superstar album and the version on the single (which differ only in the length of the introductory noise) a radio edit also exists, which removes the profanity. The phrase "hate every motherfucker" has been replaced by the alternate lyric "hate every other hater", and the word "shit" has been excised. This radio edit is the version used in the music video for "The Beautiful People".

Three official remixes of "The Beautiful People" have been released. The first, "The Horrible People", was created by Danny Saber and appears on the 1997 Remix & Repent EP; the remix features a fast-tempo drum n bass backing track, and accents the original song's swing jazz-inflected rhythm with brass and piano samples. J. G. Thirlwell's "The Not-So-Beautiful People" is a straight industrial reworking of the track, with rhythmic vocal samples and churning, filtered synthesizers. It was used as the opening theme for WWF Raw is War for only a few weeks in March 1997. Later an edited version of the song was used as the opening theme for WWF/E SmackDown! from 2001 to 2003, and a remix of it was included on WWF Forceable Entry and a 10-inch picture disc single of the song.

Marilyn Manson's 2004 greatest hits compilation, Lest We Forget: The Best Of, contains a slightly reworked version of the track. The longer introduction from the single version has been restored, and certain musical elements (most notably, an organ-like sound not noticeable in the previously released versions) have been made more pronounced. In 2010, Christina Aguilera released "The Beautiful People" from her film Burlesque, which samples the song.

In 1997, MTV News reported that Manson had expressed interest in collaborating with Snoop Dogg to produce a rock/rap version of "The Beautiful People". It is unknown if the collaboration ever actually occurred, although in his September 4, 1997 keynote address at the CMJ Music Marathon, the singer referred to the project as "something I would still love to do" and blamed the hectic touring schedules of both his own band and the rapper for the delay. To date the remix has never materialized.

== Music video ==
Manson in the music video's "dental device" costume

Floria Sigismondi directed what has been described as "the creepiest of creepy videos" for "The Beautiful People". The clip, filmed in the then-abandoned Gooderham and Worts distillery in Toronto, Canada, depicts the band performing the song in a classroom-like area decorated with medical prostheses and laboratory equipment. Intercut with these performance clips are scenes of lead singer Marilyn Manson in a long gown-like costume and aviator goggles, wearing stilts and prosthetic makeup which make him appear bald and grotesquely tall; after being placed in this costume by similarly attired attendants, he appears to a cheering crowd through a window in a scene reminiscent of a rally, and later stands in the center of a circle while people march around him pumping their fists into the air. Other fast cut scenes include extreme close-ups of crawling earthworms, mannequin heads and hands, and the boots of people marching; and shots of the individual band members bizarrely costumed, including Manson in back and neck braces, a leather aviator cap and an orthodontic cheek retractor, exposing metallic teeth.

The video was nominated for two 1997 MTV Video Music Awards: Best Rock Video and Best Special Effects.

"I'm a big fan of prosthetics and other medical fetishes. It was an interesting thing. It was used for dental operations and things of that nature. It did leave some bad cuts in my mouth that will unfortunately, probably never heal. But, you always have to suffer to make something great."

== Reception ==
Professional ratings
Review scores
Source	Rating
AllMusic	3/5 stars

The single was generally praised on its release. AllMusic's Stephen Thomas Erlewine highly praised the song, stating that "With its mock menace and pummeling metal triplets, it was the first Manson song with an oversized hook -- the kind of song that even the group's detractors couldn't get out of their heads". In its 1996 review of Antichrist Superstar, Rolling Stone magazine described "The Beautiful People" as "suspense-filled", with "a zombielike, repetitive quality [and] ghostly electronic sounds. . .", adding that in his vocal delivery, "Manson hisses his lines, punctuating certain words with a shrill, insane pitch, others with a retching scream".

In the United States, the single reached number 29 on the Billboard Mainstream Rock Tracks chart and number 26 on the Modern Rock Tracks chart. In the UK, it reached number 18 on the UK Singles Chart, peaking on June 7, 1997. In Sweden, although the song did not chart within the top 60, it was certified gold. Despite peaking at number 42 on the Australian ARIA Singles Chart, it spent 56 weeks in the top 100 and became the 89th-highest-selling single of 1997 in Australia.

=== Accolades ===
In 2002, Kerrang! ranked "The Beautiful People" 5th in their 100 Greatest Singles of All Time. In 2003, Q ranked "The Beautiful People" 192nd in their The 1001 Best Songs Ever. Q also included "The Beautiful People" under the Metal Tracks category of their Ultimate Music Collection in 2005. The music video for the single would be nominated in three categories at the 1997 MTV Video Music Awards namely, Best Rock Video, Best Art Direction and Best Special Effects.

In 2011, Both the original version and the Scala and Kolacny cover would be used as the theme music for the "7" Scarezone at Universal Orlando's Halloween Horror Nights 21 Event

== Live performances ==
"The Beautiful People" was performed sporadically during the 1995–1996 Smells Like Children Tour, frequently in abbreviated form as part of the Portrait of an American Family song "My Monkey". It was "officially" premiered on October 3, 1996, at the State Theatre in Kalamazoo – the second show of the band's Dead to the World Tour.

The band took two weeks off following the last European show of their year-long Dead to the World Tour and, on September 4, flew to New York City and performed as the grand finale of the 1997 MTV Video Music Awards. The song had reached No.26 on the Billboard Modern Rock Tracks chart and its music video was nominated at the show for Best Rock Video.

Preceded by a marching band playing "Hail to the Chief", Manson entered the stage in a full-body black fur coat flanked by mock United States Secret Service agents, and delivered a speech to the audience of Hollywood celebrities from a microphone-covered lectern emblazoned with the phrase 'Antichrist Superstar' in classical Latin script and the band's "Shock" logo fashioned to look like the seal of the president of the United States:

My fellow Americans, we will no longer be oppressed by the fascism of Christianity. And we will no longer be oppressed by the fascism of beauty. As I see you all sitting out there trying your hardest not to be ugly, trying your hardest not to fit in, trying your hardest to earn your way into Heaven, but let me ask you—do you want to be in a place that's filled with a bunch of assholes?

After the speech, the band launched into "The Beautiful People", with Manson striking rigid poses as he sang. Manson removed his coat midway thru to reveal a second costume underneath that consisted of a leather corset and g-string which revealed his bare buttocks, a pair of thigh-high fishnet hosiery attached to a leather garter belt and knee-high leather boots. The performance came to its climax as the band smashed their instruments at the end of the song. As the show closed, host Chris Rock teasingly yelled for the audience to "Run to church right now! Get your asses into church, or you're going to hell!". Despite their extremely negative review of the program as a whole, Rolling Stone singled out the performance as "riveting".

Marilyn Manson and Twiggy Ramirez joined the Smashing Pumpkins at Mountain View, California's Shoreline Amphitheatre for an acoustic performance of "The Beautiful People" during the venue's annual Bridge School Benefit on October 18, 1997. Nine Inch Nails also performed "The Beautiful People", with frontman Trent Reznor on bass guitar and Marilyn Manson on lead vocals, on May 9, 2000, at Madison Square Garden. Manson had been a surprise guest at the concert, appearing unannounced on stage during Nine Inch Nails' "Starfuckers, Inc."; this performance was filmed and released as a bonus feature on And All That Could Have Been in 2002. At the 2012 Echo Awards, Rammstein performed the song, with Marilyn Manson standing in for lead singer Till Lindemann. On October 31, 2014, in a special setup on Halloween night, Manson performed the song with Johnny Depp on guitar and Ninja (from Die Antwoord) as a background vocalist, in the club Roxy in West Hollywood.

In live performances, Manson frequently incorporates the lyric "How does it feel to be one of the beautiful people?" from the Beatles' "Baby, You're a Rich Man" into the song, either shouted over its instrumental break or as a lead-in to the introductory drums.

== Formats and track listings ==
Australian and European CD single

1. "The Beautiful People" (album version)
2. "Cryptorchid"
3. "Snake Eyes and Sissies"

UK CD single 1

1. "The Beautiful People" (single version)
2. "The Horrible People"
3. "Sweet Dreams (Are Made of This)"
4. "Cryptorchid"

UK CD single 2

1. "The Beautiful People" (album version)
2. "The Not-So-Beautiful People"
3. "Snake Eyes and Sissies"
4. "Deformography"

European enhanced CD single

1. "The Beautiful People" (single version)
2. "The Horrible People"
3. "Sweet Dreams (Are Made of This)"
4. "Cryptorchid"
5. "The Beautiful People" (video)
6. "Sweet Dreams (Are Made of This)" (video)

10-inch vinyl single (remixes)

1. "The Horrible People"
2. "The Not-So-Beautiful People"

Japanese CD single

1. "The Beautiful People" (single version)
2. "The Horrible People"
3. "Sweet Dreams (Are Made of This)" (LP version)
4. "Cryptorchid"
5. "The Not-So-Beautiful People"

== Production credits ==
Musicians:

- Marilyn Manson – vocals, lyrics
- Twiggy Ramirez – guitar, bass guitar, music
- Sean Beavan – descending horn guitar
- Daisy Berkowitz – guitar
- Ginger Fish – drums
- Madonna Wayne Gacy – keyboards, keytar

Production:

- Trent Reznor – producer
- Dave "Rave" Ogilvie – producer
- Marilyn Manson – co-producer
- Sean Beavan – mixing
- Chris Vrenna – editing and programming
- Charlie Clouser – editing and programming

=== "The Horrible People" ===
As original version, with

- Damian Savage – additional bass
- John X – "sonic rape and pillage"
- Danny Saber – remix
- Gabe and Jim – engineers

=== "The Not-So-Beautiful People" ===
As original version, with

- J. G. Thirlwell – remix

== Charts ==
=== Weekly charts ===
Weekly chart performance for "The Beautiful People"
Chart (1996–1997)	Peak position
Australia (ARIA)	42
Canada Top Singles (RPM)	61
Canada Rock/Alternative (RPM)	2
Europe (Eurochart Hot 100)	50
Netherlands (Single Top 100)	96
New Zealand (Recorded Music NZ)	29
Scottish Singles Sales (Official Charts)	15
UK Singles (Official Charts)	18
UK Network Singles (Music & Media)	10
UK Rock & Metal (Official Charts)	1
US Alternative Airplay (Billboard)	26
US Mainstream Rock Airplay (Billboard)	29

=== Year-end charts ===
1996 year-end chart performance for "The Beautiful People"
Chart (1996)	Position
Canada Rock/Alternative (RPM)	35

1997 year-end chart performance for "The Beautiful People"
Chart (1997)	Position
Australia (ARIA)	89

== Sales and certifications ==
Certifications and sales for "The Beautiful People"
Region	Certification	Certified units/sales
New Zealand (RMNZ)	2× Platinum	60,000^{‡}
Sweden (GLF)	Gold	15,000^{^}
United Kingdom (BPI)	Gold	400,000^{‡}
^{^} Shipments figures based on certification alone.^{‡} Sales+streaming figures based on certification alone.

== See also ==
- Marilyn Manson discography
