= Genealogies of Pain =

Book by Marilyn Manson

First edition

Genealogies of Pain is a coffee table book that was released on April 30, 2011 by Marilyn Manson and David Lynch through German publisher Verlag für moderne Kunst Nürnberg. The 176-page paperback catalogue pairs 30 of Manson's paintings from the Genealogies of Pain art exhibit with stills from four of Lynch's early short experimental films: Six Men Getting Sick (Six Times), The Grandmother, The Amputee, and The Alphabet. The book also includes an interview with Manson in which he discusses his techniques as well as the art traditions and schools that have been influential to his works.
