= 25th Parallel (magazine) =

Lifestyle magazine in Florida, United States

- Senior editor: Marilyn Manson; Kelly Blank
- Editor: Paul Gallotta
- Staff writers: J.D. Barker
- Categories: Lifestyle, Culture
- Frequency: Monthly
- First issue: March 1990; 36 years ago
- Country: United States
- Based in: South Florida
- Language: English

25th Parallel is an American lifestyle magazine. The magazine is named after the 25th parallel north, a circle of latitude that passes through the Florida Keys.

== Notable alumni ==
- Brian Warner, better known today as Marilyn Manson, worked for the magazine in the late-1980s writing music articles.
