= Drago (publisher) =

DRAGO
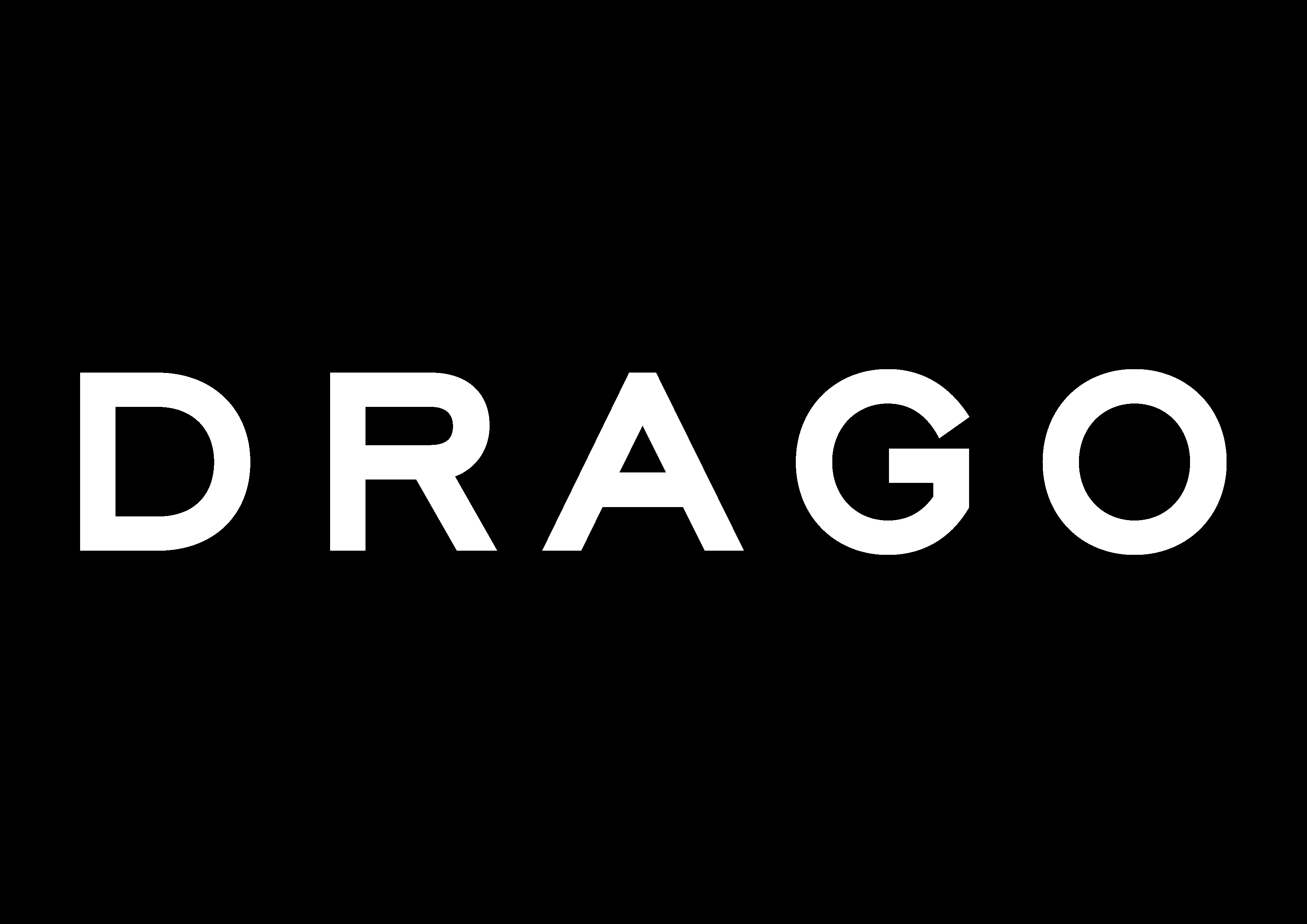
- Founded: 2001
- Founder: Paulo von Vacano
- Country of origin: Italy
- Headquarters location: Rome
- Distribution: Messaggerie Italiane SPA (Italy); Ingram Publisher Services (North America); Vice Versa Art Books (Germany); Interart (France); Turnaround Publisher Services (UK)
- Publication types: Books
- Nonfiction topics: Art
- Official website: www.dragopublisher.com

Drago (stylised as DRAGO) is an independent international publishing house of contemporary art based in Rome, Italy. The company specialises in street and urban art and has published the works of street photographers, street artists and graffiti writers from around the world. It is frequently involved in exhibitions of contemporary art and acts as the official publisher for various galleries, museums and institutions.

== Overview ==
Drago was founded in 2001 by Paulo Lucas von Vacano as publisher, following years working as an Italian-German journalist and president of the Castelvecchi Publishing Company, Posse of Antonio Negri and Aspenia Magazine of The Aspen Institute. He was joined by Domitilla Sartogo as executive director and Nicola Veccia Scavalli as art director.

In the same year, the company published its first book, Brice Marden's Brice Marden: Opere Su Carta 1964-2001 which was followed by the publication of Ed Templeton's The Golden Age of Neglect in 2002. As well as selling out quickly, this title became the professional skateboarder's best-known book.

In 2002 Drago organized the Via Crucis by Andres Serrano, an exhibition, curated by Marianna Vecellio and Angela Dorazio in the converted church Santa Marta al Collegio Romano in Rome. In 2003 Drago took part in "Now Underground", an international exhibition curated by Cecilia Nesbit and for which Drago published its catalogue. In 2005 DRAGO released La Transavangardia Italiana, a book on the Italian Neo-expressionism by Achille Bonito Oliva, with artists Mimmo Paladino, Francesco Clemente, Sandro Chia, Enzo Cucchi, Nicola De Maria and directed and produced the exhibition Kennedy: The Family, Values and History at the Temple of Hadrian in Rome. In 2007 Drago curated and organized Jeremy Fish’s exhibition Rome-Antic Delusions with artworks especially created by the artist in Rome for the exhibition. Its homonymous catalogue soon became a cult object. In 2007 Drago published Muerte, the first book on Mike Giant. The book was one of Amazon’s best sellers for several seasons. During the years Drago has published several best seller as Young Sleek and Full of Hell by Aaron Rose with interventions by artists such as Terry Richardson, Chloë Sevigny, Mark Gonzales, Carlo McCormick, Harmony Korine, Oliver Zaham, Ryan McGinley, Ari Marcopoulos, Rita Ackermann, Barry McGee, Phil Frost and Bruce Labruce. In 2007 Drago also published Heroes by Adrian Tranquilli, the catalog of the artist's exhibition at the Galleria Stefania Miscetti in Rome.

More recently, Drago's books have included Miss Van's Wild at Heart; Estevan Oriol's LA Woman and Boogie's Ah Wah do Dem, a book that received a score of 9.6/10 in a recent Street Hunters review. Among other notable books are Letizia Battaglia’s Anthology, which has been mentioned on CNN, BBC News, The Wall Street Journal and The Daily Beast, and the catalogue "Per Pura Passione", produced in a bilingual edition of the homonymous exhibition at MAXXI, National Museum of XXI Century Arts in Rome.

Drago has worked alongside many exhibitors of contemporary art. As the publisher of The French Academy in Rome – Villa Medici, it has been in charge of all publications for exhibitions and artists-in-residence and published many books with its director and art historian, Eric de Chassey. such as "Jean Auguste Dominique Ingres / Ellworth Kelly", the homonymous catalog of the exhibition whose works by Jean-Auguste-Dominique Ingres come from the Louvre museum and from the private collection of Ellsworth Kelly.

Amongst the publications for The French Academy in Rome – Villa Medici is the famous Europunk, The Visual Culture of Punk in Europe, 1976-1980, the first anthology of its kind documenting punk subculture. In 2011 Drago realized From Style Writing to Art – a Street Art Anthology with the French curator Magda Danysz. In 2012 Drago published The Wrinkles of the City Shanghai and The Wrinkles of the City Los Angeles by the artist JR. In 2013 Drago realized LA Portraits, the second project with the photographer Estevan Oriol.

Elsewhere, the company has collaborated with the Outdoor Festival in Rome to produce a five-year catalogue of their exhibitions and the Dorothy Circus Gallery in Rome to create a trilogy of books documenting over three years of exhibitions dedicated to the Lowbrow art movement and Hello Here I Am, the first anthology of the Japanese artist Kazuki Takamatsu.

Among other clients are Nike, The L'Orèal Group, Danesi, The City of Rome, 55DSL, Alcatel and Bulgari.

Drago's most recent project has been an exhibition at the Museum of Contemporary Art of Rome. Curated by Paulo Lucas von Vacano and Christian Omodeo, Cross the Streets recounts 40 years of street art and graffiti writing in Rome and beyond. It hosts 200 artworks from a number of artists ranging from Shepard Fairey to DAIM including some that came to the museum specifically to produce artwork for the exhibition.

In 2018 Drago gave birth to This Is Los Angeles by Estevan Oriol and Art From the Streets, the catalogue of French gallerist Magda Danysz’s homonymous exhibition.

During the 58th Art Biennale – 2019 – Venice, titled "May You Live in Interesting Times", DRAGO contributed to the Bahrain Pavilion, with the exhibition "The Wait: Contemporary Artists from Bahrain". In 2019 Drago published Crash Kid, A Hip Hop Legacy and in 2020 Crossroads, a Glimpse into the Life of Alice Pasquini, the first anthology of the worldwide renown Street Artist Alicè, who has been elected artist of the year by Rai Radio Tre. Drago also collaborates with the organization "Susan G. Komen Italia" for the creation of a mural, entrusted to Alice Pasquini, on the theme of breast cancer treatment and prevention, scheduled during the annual event "Komen: Race for the Cure".

In April, author Drago Estevan Oriol climbed Netflix's Top Ten in the United States with "LA Originals", a documentary created with Mister Cartoon on Chicano culture becoming a global artistic phenomenon.

In 2021 Drago publishes "B.A.D .: Beautiful and Determined", a book focused on the concept of beauty and self- acceptance. The book, result of decades of photographic research by the authors Erika Zanatta and Alessandra Tisato, is a manifesto on the empowerment of women and non-binary people. In the same year, on the occasion of the launch of the Red Valentino Spring / Summer 2021 campaign, Drago created the monographic volume "Stazione Termini Lookbook 2009-2021" with the author of the campaign directed by Pierpaolo Piccioli, Niccolò Berretta. For more than ten years Niccolò Berretta has photographed people in the largest train station in Rome. Following the media coverage, including the Financial Times, the volume was presented at LMDS, Le Monde de SHC in Shanghai and during the Pop Up Black Tag events in the concept stores in Rome and Milan.

"Neapolis" is the latest catalog published by Drago with the international photographer Boogie, a collector's photographic book on Naples with more than 80 black and white images and with the introduction of Luchè. "Street Life" is the first book by director and screenwriter Brad Mirman that explores the universe of Los Angeles from personal view with more than a hundred black and white pictures. From 8 to 10 October Drago participated as creative director and communication agency of the 21st edition of the International Tattoo Expo in Rome.

In October 2021 Drago made Janette Beckman's monograph entitled "Rebels: From Punk to Dior". The book contains photos of the pioneers of the Hip hop movement such as Salt-N-Pepa, Run DMC, Grand Master Flash, Slick Rick e LL Cool J. In December Rebels was elected among the Books of the Year 2021 by the Rough Trade Center of New York. The Fotografiska Museum presented the volume as well as the Dior store in New York with the creation of a limited edition print. Among the media that have been involved in advertising appear The Guardian, Forbes, Fox5, VMagazine.

In the second semester of the 2021's academic year, Paulo von Vacano, publisher and CEO Drago, during the Fashion Studies degree course at Sapienza Università di Roma, held several "Luxury and High Fashion Brand Communication" lessons together with Professor Paolo Cenciarelli, bringing as case studies, various project experiences of his publishing house.

On December 8, 2021, Drago inaugurated, at the National Galleries of Ancient Art in Rome, the exhibition "Giuseppe Loy. A certain Italy. Photographs 1959-1981", curated by Chiara Agradi and Angelo Loy. The catalog contains the texts of Edoardo Albinati, writer, Chiara Agradi, art historian, Luca Massimo Barbero, director of the Institute of Art History of the Fondazione Giorgio Cini, Bruno Corà, president of the Fondazione Palazzo Albizzini Collezione Burri, Emilio Garroni, philosopher, Margherita Guccione, director of MAXXI Architettura, Angelo Loy, president of the Giuseppe Loy Photographic Archive, Rosetta Loy, writer, Alice Rohrwacher, director.

In April 2022 Drago created the "Jago" catalog for the first anthological exhibition of the sculptor at Palazzo Bonaparte (Rome).

In May of the same year, in Nancy, France, the Galerie Poirel, in collaboration with the mayor of the city of Nancy and the Musee des Beaux-Arts, organised the first major solo exhibition of Alexone Dizac within an institutional space. The exhibition showcased the most significant works of one of the leading figures in French Street Art, and DRAGO was responsible for producing the catalogue titled "A Coeur Ouvert".

Considering the sudden success of the book "Rebels, From Punk to Dior" by the renowned English photographer Janette Beckman, in 2022 Drago launched a second edition, this time in softcover, to coincide with the artist's European tour in the autumn. Subsequent events took place in New York and Paris at Dior stores, The Photographers' Gallery in London, and the International Centre of Photography in New York.

In collaboration with the University of Bologna and the Rodrigo Pais Archive, Drago produced the first comprehensive catalogue of Rodrigo Pais, titled "Rodrigo Pais, Sguardi sulla Moda, Fotografie dagli anni Cinquanta" (which translates to “Glimpses of Fashion, Photographs from the 1950’s” a collection of fashion photographs from the 1950’s by Rodrigo Pais). Featuring texts by Chiara Pompa, Bianca Cappello (jewellery historian and critic), Glenda Furini, Simona Segre-Reinach, Vittoria Caterina Caratozzolo, Guido Gambetta (Scientific Director of the "Fondo Fotografico Rodrigo Pais" collection (a collection of photographs associated with Rodrigo Pais), and Francesco Citti (President of the University Library of Bologna), the volume collects precious testimonies of Pais, a fashion photographer who analysed the evolution of Italian society in the second half of the last century, recounting unconventional moments from the recent past.

Drago then published "Armando, la furia del Quadraro" ("Armando, the Fury of the Quadraro"), the first book by photographer Fabio Fasiello, who documented the life and struggles of Armando Casamonica, a well-known and controversial boxer, within one of Rome's most historic gyms in the Quadraro neighbourhood.

Drago subsequently released "The Red Skein", the most comprehensive monograph of the artist Swoon, one of the most influential street artists in the New York and international art scenes. Swoon presented her book at various galleries, including a solo exhibition at the Turner Carroll Gallery in Santa Fe, a launch with exhibition and book signing at the Jeffrey Deitch Gallery in New York, and at the Taglialatella Gallery in New York. In the autumn of 2023, two exhibitions were held at the Mesa Contemporary Arts Museum (Arizona, USA) and the Taubman Museum of Art (Virginia, USA).

“JBROCK: Sette Variazioni 2000-2022" documented the evolution of the character Ciccio, which brought artist JBROCK fame in Italy and internationally. Through seven episodes in various iconic locations of the Roman capital, from Porta Portese to Ponte della Musica, from Campo de' Fiori to Trastevere and Ponte Milvio, the artist in collaboration with photographer Niccolò Beretta and curator Giacomo Guidi for Contemporary Cluster, presented a new work featuring his most iconic character, Ciccio, each time. The book, which also includes a text written by Lucamaleonte, was published in a limited edition of 200 numbered and signed copies by the artist.

From April 5 to July 23, Palazzo Cipolla, Fondazione Terzo Pilastro in Rome, hosted the exhibition "Ipotesi Metaverso", for which DRAGO produced the bilingual catalogue. The exhibition showcased a survey of historical and contemporary works of artists like Escher, Refik Anadol, De Chirico, Depero, Pak, Balla, Boccion, Krista Kim, Piranesi and Primavera De Filippi. The exhibition of the past alongside digital art in the realm of imagination, featuring immersive swings, digital Zen philosophy, techno-nature, blockchain sculptures, virtual reality, generative literature, and artificial intelligence.

Drago published "CALIFORNIA LOCOS: Renaissance & Rebellion", a book of over 400 pages that, for the first time, brought the philosophy of the cultural collective composed of five Los Angeles artists – Chaz Bojórquez, Dave Tourjé, John Van Hamersveld, Norton Wisdom, and Gary Wong – to Europe. The book aimed at capturing the culture of the West Coast: surf, skate, street art, photography, design, and music. Being a LOCO means being in love with life, creative, rebellious, and open to the ethnic and cultural diversity of the world. LOCOS is a movement that embodies innovation, multiculturalism, and rebellion. With a grand launch in the United States, featuring 400 posters in both New York and Los Angeles, the exhibition was launched at the Eastern Projects Gallery of Los Angeles in June.

Drago has published 152 titles, of which 12 have sold out.

== Paulo von Vacano ==
Paulo Lucas von Vacano is an Italian-German publisher based in Rome who founded Drago in 2002. A former journalist, he contributed to several international magazines and newspapers. He then served as president of the Castelvecchi Publishing Company where he produced 500 books and several magazines, including Toni Negri's Posse and Aspenia Magazine (of The Aspen Institute).

As founder of Drago Publishing, he has curated several exhibitions, including "Cross The Streets" at the MACRO in 2017, which exhibited artists such as Shepard Fairey aka Obey the Giant, Estevan Oriol, Invader, Evol, Boogie, WK Interact, Lee Quinones, and Fab 5 Freddy.

Other exhibitions he has curated include "Angel of Decay" by Ed Templeton, "Via Crucis" by the artist Andrès Serrano "Kennedy: the family, values, history", the biggest European exhibition on the Kennedy family at the Temple of Hadrian (Rome).

Since 2014 Paulo Lucas von Vacano has been a share-holder of the Audaces Foundation, an international non-profit organization that provides educational platforms.

== Domitilla Sartogo ==
Domitilla Sartogo graduated with a BA in Fine Arts from the Cooper Union School of Art, New York. She has been the executive director of Drago since 2004. She previously worked as a graphic designer for the Richard Avedon Studio, as a talent scout and director of photography for Fabrica, the Benetton Group Center of Communications, as a professor of editorial design at the Parsons School of Design and as communications director for Borbonese, an Italian fashion brand where she also curated its fashion shows. She has acted as the executive director of the Florence Biennale of Fashion and Cinema, with seven exhibitions focusing on the relationship between film and fashion that brought together set, costume, and fashion designers from around the world.

== Selected books ==
- 2002: Ed Templeton The Golden Age of Neglect (ISBN 9788888493022)
- 2005: Aaron Rose Young, Sleek and Full of Hell (ISBN 9788888493312)
- 2006: Papik Rossi Mr. Rossi (ISBN 9788888493114)
- 2006: The Don, Microbo & Bo, Izastikup (ISBN 9788888493336)
- 2008: Alex Flach Berlin Calling (ISBN 9788888493374)
- 2008: Angelo Sindaco Skinstreet (ISBN 9788888493350)
- 2009: Nick Walker: A Sequence of Events (ISBN 9788888493466)
- 2009: Mike Giant Muerte (ISBN 9788888493190)
- 2009: Sten and Lex Stencil Poster (ISBN 9788888493602)
- 2009: Dalek His Majesty Fallacy (ISBN 9788888493497)
- 2009: JonOne JonOne Rock (ISBN 9788888493510)
- 2009: RJ Rushmore The Thousands (ISBN 9788888493534)
- 2009: Mike Giant Coup D'Etat (ISBN 9788888493312)
- 2010: Estevan Oriol LA Woman (ISBN 9788888493473)
- 2010: Dorothy Circus Gallery City Slang (ISBN 9788888493404)
- 2010: Dorothy Circus Gallery Pop Surrealism (ISBN 9788888493695)
- 2011: Miss Van Twinkles (ISBN 9788888493787)
- 2011: Magda Danysz and Marie Noelle Dana: From Style Writing to Art (ISBN 9788888493664)
- 2011: Éric de Chassey Europunk: The Visual Culture of Punk in Europe (ISBN 9788888493732)
- 2011: JBROCK & Diamond Roma Omnia Vincit (ISBN 9788888493640)
- 2011: Ricardo Ghilardi Lo Sguardo Non Mente (ISBN 9788888493824)
- 2011: Brian Adam Douglas Paper Cuts (ISBN 9788888493770)
- 2011: CB Smith Phone Book (ISBN 9788888493756)
- 2012: Miss Van Wild at Heart (ISBN 9788888493930)
- 2012: JR The Wrinkles of the City: Shanghai (ISBN 9788888493718)
- 2012: JR The Wrinkles of the City: Los Angeles (ISBN 9788888493909)
- 2012: Chris Stain Long Story Short (ISBN 9788888493763)
- 2013: Estevan Oriol LA Portraits (ISBN 9788888493893)
- 2013: Ricky Adams: Destroying Everything (ISBN 9788888493923)
- 2013: Dorthy Circus Gallery Once Upon a Time (ISBN 9788888493886)
- 2013: Dorthy Circus Gallery Walk on the Wild Side (ISBN 9788888493954)
- 2013: Magda Danysz Les Bains (ISBN 9788888493978)
- 2013: Micol Di Verol Israel Now (ISBN 9788888493879)
- 2013: Sean Scully Change & Horizontals (ISBN 9788888493916)
- 2014: DAIM Mirko Reisser [DAIM]: 1986-2014 (ISBN 9788898565016)
- 2014: Angelo Sindaco Cooking with the Bears (ISBN 9788898565061)
- 2014: Massimo Sgroi Shepard Fairy #Obey (ISBN 9788898565108)
- 2014: WK WK Act 4 (ISBN 9788898565009)
- 2014: Maureen Brodbeck Oeuvres Photographique (ISBN 9788898565078)
- 2014: Outdoor Roma Wasn't Built in a Day (ISBN 9788898565085)
- 2014: M. Cardelli, A. Nove Isabella Ferrari Forma-Luce (ISBN 9788898565030)
- 2015: Boogie: A Wah Do Dem (ISBN 9788898565139)
- 2015: Dorthy Circus Gallery The Doors of Perception (ISBN 9788888493961)
- 2015: Kazuki Takamatsu Hello Here I AM (ISBN 9788898565115)
- 2016: Letizia Battaglia Anthology (ISBN 9788898565184)
- 2016: Letizia Battaglia Per Pura Passione (ISBN 9788898565320)
- 2016: Stefan Canto: Concrete Archive (ISBN 9788898565160)
- 2016: WK WK-Gear (ISBN 9788898565337)
- 2016: Dolce Q: Rome Wasn't Drawn in a Day (ISBN 9788898565344)
- 2017: Paulo von Vacano The Street is Watching: Where Street Knowledge Meets Photography (ISBN 9788898565153)
- 2017: Paulo von Vacano Cross the Streets (ISBN 9788898565221)
- 2017: Marco Kayone Mantovani Vecchia Scuola: Graffiti Writing A Milano (ISBN 9788898565238)
- 2017: Keffer The Night Day: A Story About The Other Side (ISBN 9788898565290)
- 2017: AAVV: Decades: 5 Artists for 5 Decades of Pop Culture (ISBN 9788898565283)
- 2017: AAVV Io Sono Persona (ISBN 9788898565269)
- 2017: AAVV Jungle: L'Immaginario Animale nella Moda (ISBN 9788898565214)
- 2017: Claudia Pajewski The Hands of the City (ISBN 9788898565306) (ISBN 9788898565351)
- 2018: Magda Danysz Art From The Streets (ISBN 9788898565276)
- 2018: Estevan Oriol This is Los Angeles (ISBN 9788898565245)
- 2018: Faith XLVII Ex Animo (ISBN 9788898565436)
- 2018: Felipe Pantone Dynamic Phenomena (ISBN 9788898565382)
- 2018: Futura 2000 Full Frame (ISBN 9788898565375)
- 2018: Claudio Zambianchi, Ilaria Schiaffini, Vittoria Caterina Caratozzolo Irene Brin, Gaspero del Corso e La Galleria L'Obelisco (ISBN 9788898565412)
- 2018: JonOne JonOne None Niente Può Fermarmi (ISBN 9788898565443)
- 2019: Paolo Cenciarelli Vangelo MMXVIII (ISBN 9788898565405)
- 2019: N. Shabout, E. Elgibreen After Illusion (ISBN 8898565151)
- 2019: Napal & Ben Matundu, Crash Kids, A Hip Hop Legacy (ISBN 8898565399)
- 2020: Alice Pasquini, Crossroads: A Glimpse into the Life of Alice Pasquini (ISBN 9788898565528)
- 2021: Erika Zanatta and Alessandra Tisato, B.A.D.:Beautiful And Determined (ISBN 9788898565450)
- 2021: Niccolò Beretta, Stazione Termini Lookbook 2009-2021 (ISBN 9788898565429)
- 2021: Brad Mirman, Street Life (ISBN 9788898565597)
- 2021: Boogie, Neapolis (ISBN 9788898565757)
- 2021: Janette Beckman Rebels: From Punk To Dior (ISBN 9788898565467)
- 2021: Giuseppe Loy Una Certa Italia (ISBN 9788898565726)
- 2022: Jago Jago (ISBN 978-88-98565-65-8)
- 2022: Alexone Dizac, "A Coeur Ouvert" (ISBN 978-8898565658)
- 2022: Rodrigo Pais, "Rodrigo Pais, Sguardi sulla Moda, Fotografie dagli anni Cinquanta" (ISBN 978-8898565672)
- 2022: Fabio Fasiello, "Armando, la furia del Quadraro" (ISBN 978-8898565504)
- 2022: Swoon, "The Red Skein" (ISBN 978-8898565474)
- 2022: JBROCK, "JBROCK: Sette Variazioni 2000-2022" (ISBN 978-8898565771)
- 2023: Gabriele Simongini, Serena Tabacchi, "Ipotesi Metaverso" (ISBN 978-8898565511)
- 2023: Dave Tourje, "CALIFORNIA LOCOS: Renaissance & Rebellion" (ISBN 978-8898565252)

=== Book series ===
2007: 36 Chambers. Inspired by the film The 36th Chamber of Shaolin, the series features 17 books from a diverse range of contemporary artists including Nick Walker, Mike Giant and Ivory Serra. For many of these artists, including Nick Walker, their contribution to the series was their first ever book.

== Exhibitions ==
=== Drago exhibitions ===
- 2002: Andres Serrano: Via Crucis at Santa Marta al Collegio Romano, a deconsecrated church in Rome. Curated by Paulo von Vacano.
- 2003: Ed Templeton: Angel of Decay at Acquario Romano in Rome. Curated by Paulo von Vacano.
- 2005: Kennedy. La Famiglia, I Valori, Una Storia at the Temple of Hadrian in Rome. Commissioned by Walter Veltroni and organised by Drago, the exhibition remains the largest in Europe to document the Kennedy family. Catalogue ISBN 9788888493084.
- 2017: Cross the Streets; 40 Years of Street Art and Writing at the Museum of Contemporary Art of Rome. Curated by Paulo von Vacano, concept by Drago.
- 2017: The Street is Watching, at the International Centre of Photography, Palermo, Italy
- 2021: Giuseppe Loy. Una certa Italia. Fotografie 1959-1981, at the National Galleries of Ancient Art in Rome

=== Exhibition catalogues ===
- 2008: Scala Mercalli at Auditorium Parco della Musica in Rome. Curated by Gianluca Marziani. Catalogue ISBN 9788888493428.
- 2008: City Slang, The Street Comes to the Gallery at the Dorothy Circus Gallery in Rome. Catalogue ISBN 9788888493404
- 2009: Dalek + Mike Giant at the Magda Danysz Gallery in Paris. Curated by Magda Danysz. Dalek catalogue ISBN 9788888493497, Mike Giant catalogue ISBN 9788888493190
- 2010: I Mutanti at the French Academy in Rome. Curated by Eric de Chassey. Catalogue ISBN 9788888493596
- 2010: Jean-Auguste Dominique Ingres / Ellsworth Kelly at the French Academy in Rome. Curated by Eric de Chassey. Catalogue ISBN 9788888493619
- 2011: Europunk: The Visual Culture Of Punk In Europe at the French Academy in Rome. Curated by Eric de Chassey. English catalogue ISBN 9788888493725.
- 2011: Lo Sguardo Non Mente (English: The Eyes Never Lie) at Palazzo Cà Zanardi, Venice by Riccardo Ghilardi. Catalogue ISBN 9788888493824
- 2012: Miss Van: Wild at Heart at the Dorothy Circus Gallery in Rome. Catalogue ISBN 9788888493930
- 2012: Jean-Marc Bustamante at the French Academy in Rome. Curated by Eric de Chassey. Catalogue ISBN 9788888493831
- 2013: Israel Now [Reinventing the Future] at the Museum of Contemporary Art of Rome. Curated by Micol Di Veroli. Catalogue ISBN 9788888493879.
- 2013: Les Bains : Résidence d’Artistes at les Bains Douches in Paris. Commissioned by Jeanne-Pierre Marois and curated by Magda Danysz. Catalogue ISBN 9788888493978
- 2013: Sean Scully: Change and Horizontals at the Galleria Nazionale d'Arte Moderna in Rome. Curated by Joanna Kleinberg and Brett Littman, in collaboration with Peter Benson Miller. Catalogue ISBN 9788888493916.
- 2013-2014: Europunk – Cité de la Musique at Cité de la Musique, Paris. Curated by Eric de Chassey. Catalogue ISBN 9788888493992.
- 2014: Simon Hantai at the French Academy in Rome. Curated by Eric de Chassey. Catalogue ISBN 9788898565023
- 2014: Shepard Fairey #OBEY at Palazzo delle Arti di Napoli in Naples. Curated by Massimo Sgroi. Catalogue ISBN 9788898565108.
- 2015: Kazuki Takamatsu, Even a Doll Can Do It at the Dorothy Circus Gallery in Rome. Catalogue ISBN 9788898565115.
- 2016-2017: Letizia Battaglia, Just For Passion (Italian: Per Pura Passione) at the MAXXI National Museum of the 21st Century Arts in Rome. Curated by Paolo Falcone, Margherita Guccione, and Bartolomeo Pietromarchi. English catalogue ISBN 9788898565207, Italian catalogue ISBN 9788898565320.
- 2017: Concept Paulo Lucas von Vacano, Cross the Streets at the MACRO Museum of Contemporary Art in Rome. Catalogue ISBN 9788898565221)
- 2017: Giovanna Calvenzi e Kitty Bolognesi, Io sono Persona ISBN 9788898565269)
- 2017: AAVV Jungle: L'Immaginario Animale nella Moda (ISBN 9788898565214)
- 2017: Claudia Pajewski The Hands of the City (ISBN 9788898565306) (ISBN 9788898565351)
- 2018: Magda Danysz Art From The Streets (ISBN 9788898565276)
- 2018: Estevan Oriol This is Los Angeles (ISBN 9788898565245)
- 2018: Faith XLVII Ex Animo (ISBN 9788898565436)
- 2018: Felipe Pantone Dynamic Phenomena (ISBN 9788898565382)
- 2018: Futura 2000 Full Frame (ISBN 9788898565375)
- 2018: Claudio Zambianchi, Ilaria Schiaffini, Vittoria Caterina Caratozzolo Irene Brin, Gaspero del Corso e La Galleria L'Obelisco (ISBN 9788898565412)
- 2018: JonOne JonOne None Niente Può Fermarmi (ISBN 9788898565443)
- 2019: Paolo Cenciarelli Vangelo MMXVIII (ISBN 9788898565405)
- 2019: N. Shabout, E. Elgibreen After Illusion (ISBN 8898565151)
- 2019: Napal & Ben Matundu, Crash Kids, A Hip Hop Legacy (ISBN 8898565399)
- 2020: Alice Pasquini, Crossroads: A Glimpse into the Life of Alice Pasquini (ISBN 9788898565528)
- 2021: Erika Zanatta e Alessandra Tisato, "B.A.D.:Beautiful And Determined" (ISBN 9788898565450)
- 2021: Niccolò Berretta, "Stazione Termini Lookbook 2009-2021" (ISBN 9788898565429)
- 2021: Brad Mirman, "Street Life" (ISBN 9788898565597)
- 2021: Boogie, "Neapolis" (ISBN 9788898565757)
- 2021: Janette Beckman, "Rebels: From Punk To Dior" (ISBN 9788898565467)
- 2021: Giuseppe Loy, "Una Certa Italia" (ISBN 9788898565726)
- 2022: Alexone Dizac, "A Coeur Ouvert" (ISBN 978-8898565658)
- 2022: Rodrigo Pais, "Rodrigo Pais, Sguardi sulla Moda, Fotografie dagli anni Cinquanta" (ISBN 978-8898565672)
- 2022: Fabio Fasiello, "Armando, la furia del Quadraro" (ISBN 978-8898565504)
- 2022: Swoon, "The Red Skein" (ISBN 978-8898565474)
- 2022: JBROCK, "JBROCK: Sette Variazioni 2000-2022" (ISBN 978-8898565771)
- 2023: Gabriele Simongini, Serena Tabacchi, "Ipotesi Metaverso" (ISBN 978-8898565511)
- 2023: Dave Tourje, "CALIFORNIA LOCOS: Renaissance & Rebellion" (ISBN 978-8898565252)
- 2021: Giuseppe Loy Una Certa Italia (ISBN 9788898565726)
- 2022: Jago Jago (ISBN 978-88-98565-65-8)
