= Magda Danysz =

French art curator and art dealer

Magda Danysz (born September 1974), is a French art curator and art dealer, she owns her galleries named Magda Danysz Gallery in Paris, in Shanghai, and in London.

== Life and career ==
Magda Danysz started in the art business in the early 1990s, when she opened her first art space in 1991 when she was 17. She studied at the ESSEC French leading business school. She went on student exchanges at Osaka International University in 1995 and Buenos Aires University in 1998. After graduating in 1998, she opened her gallery in July of that same year in a brand new space. She curated projects in her gallery with artists from various disciplines, from street art to digital art.

Founder of the Danysz art galleries in Paris (since 1991), Shanghai (2009) and London (2019) as well as the Artcare and Artransfer startups (2021), Magda Danysz focuses on art, technology, and global change through culture. Throughout the years, she became an expert in street art, as well as digital art, contemporary photography, and Chinese contemporary art.

She brought Shepard Fairey to the French scene in the early 2000s (who did Barack Obama's official portrait for the presidential campaign), worked with such as JonOne since 1992, and also exhibited and promoted artists as Seen, Miss Van, Erwin Olaf, JR, Prune Nourry, Vhils and Ultralab. She participated in many art fairs around the world including Paris, Bologna, Brussels, New York, and even Miami. In June 2009 she was appointed to direct the building's Bund 18 gallery in Shanghai, China, which then became the Magda Danysz Gallery. She published an extensive anthology of street art. In 2015 she expanded her gallery business in London with her iconic pop up space called The London Project.

During the first years of her gallery, she did consulting at Arthur Andersen from 1997 to 2004. She consulted for the cultural field, including positions with the Ministry of Culture, Christie's, the Théâtre Marigny, the Nantes Museum, and the Louvre.

Since 2001 Danysz has taught cultural policies and economics at Sciences Po in Paris. She is on the board of the multimedia cultural art center Le Cube in Issy-les-Moulineaux, whose mayor André Santini appointed her to promote digital art and research.

Danysz’ commitment for art is far from limited to the walls of her galleries. She is curating public and private exhibitions, commissions, and projects around the world from Beijing to Singapore, via London or Luxemburg. In 2007, she was knighted Chevalier of Arts and Letters by the French Ministry of Culture. In 2010, she joined the Executive Committee of the Shanghai Biennale producing the Wrinkles of the City project by artist JR on the city scale.

In 2021, Danysz co-founded Artransfer, a platform aiming at streamlining the secondary art market and Artcare, a company supporting cultural actors in the artistic production of NFT and web 3.0 contents. In 2022, she is curating exhibitions with institutions such as the city of Paris (1982-2022: 40 years of Street Art in Paris) or the Condition Publique art center in Roubaix (The representation and place of women in the public space). As a writer she has published books ranging from artists' monographs to critical essays about Art.

== Majors artistes represented ==
The following artistes are represented by Magda Danysz Gallery:

Botto e Bruno	Liu Bolin	Marion Peck	Space Invader	James McNabb
Zhang Dali	Li Hongbo	Charles Petillon	L'Atlas	SWOON
Faile	Ludo	Huang Rui	Blek Le Rat	Abdul Rahman Katanani
Shepard Fairey	Wang Keping	Sten Lex	Mark Ryden	
Futura 2000	Maleonn	Vhils	André Saraiva	
JonOne	Prune Nourry	Yang Yongliang	Gaël Davrinche	
JR	Erwin Olaf	YZ	Zevs	Nasty

== Awards and recognition ==
- France China Foundation Young Leader (2013)
- Compagnie National des Experts (CNE), experte en art contemporain chinois et street art (2010)
- French American Foundation (Young Leader) (2009)
- Chevalier des Arts et des Lettres (promotion 14 juillet 2006)
- Amis du Palais de Tokyo (depuis 2005)
- Membre du Comité des Galeries d’Art (depuis 2002)
- ESSEC Alumni (depuis 1998)

== Exhibitions (selected) ==
- Invader – 17 May – 21 June 2003
- Mambo – 31 January – 28 February 2004
- Dalek – 15 May – 12 June 2004
- Miss Van – 19 June – 24 July 2004
- Wonderland – 16 April – 28 May 2005, with Marion Peck, Mark Ryden, Eric White, Clayton Brothers
- Dalek & Shepard Fairey – 4 June – 30 July 2005
- Miss Van – 29 April – 27 May 2006
- Shepard Fairey (Obey) – 3 June – 29 July 2006
- Dalek – 21 October – 25 November 2006
- Seen – PleaSE ENjoy Solo Show; 29 May – 26 June 2010
- Mike Giant – Solo Show; 28 April – 26 May 2007
- Prune Nourry - Terracotta Daughters - 22 March - 10 May 2014
- JR : Close Up – Solo Show - 17 May - 5 July 2014
- Futura: Introspective – Solo Show - 14 June - 26 July 2014
- Vhils – Vestiges – Solo Show - 11 October - 15 November 2014
- Contemporary Chinese photography - 29 November - 23 December 2014
- Shepard Fairey et Denis Morris : SID Superman is Dead 4 July - 1 August 2015
- JonOne - Staring at the Stars Solo Show - 10 July - 30 August 2015
- Marion Peck – Solo Show - 15 March - 30 April 2016
- Charles Pétillon – Solo Show - 14 May - 2 July 2016
- Prune Nourry -Imbalance – Solo Show; 15 October - 27 November 2016
- FAILE – Solo Show - 5 nov - 31 December 2016
- Abdul Rahman Katanina, Hard Core, 2 December -13 January 2017, Paris
- Superpoze, For We The Living, 14 October - 25 November 2017, Paris
- Giada Ripa, The Yokohama Project, 14 October - 25 November 2017, Paris
- André, Solo show, 15 July-16 September 2017, Shanghai
