= Sten Lex =

Sten (born 1982, in Rome) and Lex (born 1982, in Taranto), known as Sten & Lex, are two Italian street artists.

Sten & Lex have been doing stencils on the street since 2000/2001 and today their work is part of the urban landscape in London, Paris, Barcelona, New York City, and in their home town of Rome. During that early period in Rome, and Italy in general, there wasn't a strong stencil culture such as there was in France, and Sten & Lex are seen by many as the pioneers of "Stencil Graffiti" in Italy and were the first to be considered "stencil artists". All the work of Sten & Lex results from an individual path that developed far from art academies and design institutes and far from a classic writing and graffiti background. The duo are best known in the history of stencil-making for introducing the halftone stencil technique, in which the greater part of their stencil portraits is composed of thousands of lines. They usually produce portraits of anonymous people they have photographed themselves or found in family photos album.

In 2008, they took part in the Cans Festival : Banksy invited thirty-nine artists from around the world, including, Prism, Blek, Faile, Vhils, Vexta, to exhibit their work in an abandoned tunnel near Leake Street in South East London.

In 2009, they started producing what they call "Stencil Poster". The technique derives from the union of two of the main techniques of street art: Stencil and Poster. They glue a stencil cut from paper on the wall and paint over it. They then destroy the matrix and apply its scraps to the wall, thus allowing them to become part of the work itself. The bits of matrix applied to the wall wear out over time, producing work in a state of constant change. Unlike stencil work in general, the images thus created cannot be reproduced, rendering each piece original and unique. A book documenting this technique entitled "Stencil Poster" was published in 2009 by Drago.

In 2011, they entered the contemporary art world with large-scale pieces in museums, such as the Museum of Contemporary Art of Rome (MACRO) in Rome, Italy and the Carandente Museum in Spoleto, Italy. That same year, they participated in major international festivals, such as the "Walk This Way" Festival in Koge, Denmark and the "Nuart" Festival in Stavanger, Norway, contributing to the growth of their fame and popularity.

2012 saw the production of monumental projects that led to Sten Lex being recognized as emerging artists increasingly in demand. They were invited to the "Living Walls" show in Atlanta, USA; the Centre de la Gravure et de l’Image imprimée in La Louvière, Belgium, as well as to the "Outer Spaces" outdoor show in Poznan, Poland and the "Open Walls" in Baltimore, USA.

In 2012, they also presented their work in a large solo show at the Magda Danysz Gallery in Paris. The Shanghai, China branch of the same gallery granted them another solo show in the Spring of 2013, referring to the duo as among "the most innovative at the moment."

In anticipation of their solo show at Rome's "Wunderkammern" gallery in January 2015, AGRPress referred to them as "among the most internationally recognized Italian street artists."

In 2017, StenLex worked with Distrito Tec , México to do what it is considered the world's largest stencil. Their work consists of four thousand square meters of surface. Specifically, 1,952 square meters of black and white paint, plus 1,600 square meters of paper strips. The curatorship of the six works that make up the project is in charge of the art and design agency ARTO Studio.

== Videography ==
- 2009 Painted Poster, Via delle Conce, Rome PAINTED POSTER on Youtube
- 2011 Stencil Poster, Walk This Way, Køge, 2011 STENCIL POSTER, KØGE, 2011 on Youtube

== Bibliography ==
- Stencil Poster, Drago, 2009
- Sten & Lex, Drago, 2010
- Maximiliano Ruiz, Walls & Frames, Berlin, Gestalten, 2011.
