= Keiffer =

Keiffer is a given name. Notable people with the name include:

- Keiffer Hubbell (born 1989), American ice dancer
- Keiffer Mitchell Jr. (born 1967), American politician

== See also ==
- Keffer
- Kieffer
