= Boogie (photographer) =

Serbian photographer

- Born: Vladimir Milivojevich; 1969 (age 56–57); Belgrade, Serbia
- Known for: Photography
- Website: www.artcoup.com

Boogie (born Vladimir Milivojevich; 1969) is a photographer from Serbia, based in Brooklyn, New York. He has made documentary and portrait photographs of people on the margins of society and street photography.

== Life and work ==
Boogie was born and raised in Belgrade, Serbia. In 1997 he was granted a Green card for United States lawful permanent residency through its Diversity Immigrant Visa lottery program. He moved to New York City in 1998 and is based in Brooklyn.

His first book, It's All Good, was one of five finalists (not winner) for Best Photography Book of 2006 at the Santa Fe Prize for Photography. (Note: At the time of the competition in 2006, It's All Good was instead called In the Projects.) His work has been published in The New York Times, Time, The Huffington Post and Huck. His work was shown on the HBO show How To Make It in America and he was featured in Cheryl Dunn's Everybody Street (2013) documentary film along with other photographers who have used New York City streets as a major subject in their work. In 2009 Altamont Apparel had a range of t-shirts with Boogie's photographs screen-printed onto them.

== Publications ==
- It's All Good. Brooklyn, NY: Miss Rosen / powerHouse, 2006. ISBN 978-1576873380
- Boogie. Brooklyn, NY: powerHouse, 2007. ISBN 978-1576874127. Edition of 500 copies.
- Sao Paulo. San Francisco, CA: Gingko / Upper Playground, 2008. ISBN 978-0979086274
- Istanbul: Photographs by Boogie. San Francisco, CA: Upper Playground, 2008. ISBN 978-1934991022
- Belgrade Belongs to Me. Brooklyn, NY: powerHouse, 2009. ISBN 978-1576874653. A compilation of work over 15 years.
- A Wah Do Dem. Rome: Drago, 2015. ISBN 978-8898565139.
- Persona Non Grata: Photographs by Boogie. Brooklyn, NY: powerHouse, 2022. With an introduction by Tracy Quan. ISBN 9781648230011.

== Exhibitions ==
- 2007: Paris Photo, Galerie Olivier Robert, Paris.
- 2008: Colette, Paris. Featured photographs from Boogie.
- 2008: Boogie, Galerie Olivier Robert, Paris. Featured photographs from Boogie.
- 2009: Boogie. 5 Days, AvantGarden Gallery, Milan. Photographs of Milan taken over five days.
- 2009: When Crooks Roam the Streets, Galerie Olivier Robert, Paris.
- 2009/2010: Noli Me Tangere = Do Not Touch Me, Galerie Olivier Robert, Paris. With Joey Haley, Bili Bidjocka, Eric Pougeau, Chen Chieh-Jen, Martial Raysse, Elodie Lesourd and Lionel Scoccimaro.
- 2010: The Best of Times, basement gallery, Altamont Apparel, New York, NY. Solo exhibition. 700 new and old photographs.
- 2010: The Uncovering, Carmichael Gallery, Culver City, CA. Solo exhibition of new black-and-white and colour photographs.
- 2016: Blow Your Mind, Magazzini Fotografici, Naples. Solo exhibition including photographs from A Wah Do Dem.
