= Felipe Pantone =

Argentine-Spanish artist

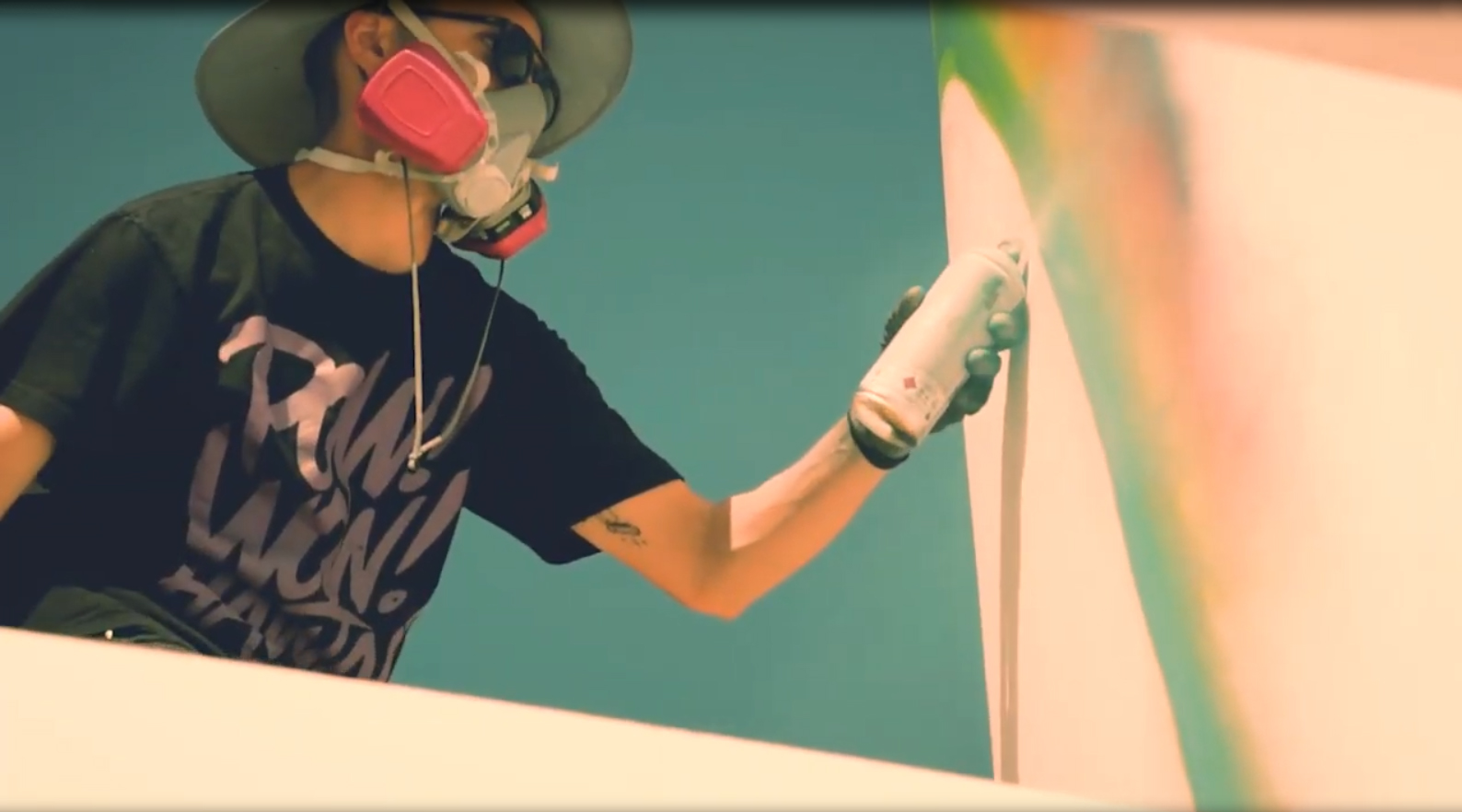
- Born: 1986 (age 39–40); Buenos Aires, Argentina
- Known for: Graffiti, painting, sculpture
- Website: www.felipepantone.com

Felipe Pantone (born 1986) is an Argentine-Spanish contemporary artist. He was born in Buenos Aires, Argentina and raised in southeast Spain. Pantone's body of work is based in kinetic art, installations, graffiti, and design, characterized by «use of bold colors, geometrical patterns, and Op Art elements». His combinations recall «bright colored typography, 80s Synth pop music, and SMPTE color bars on the TV».

== History ==
Pantone began doing graffiti as Pant1 in Torrevieja, Spain, then moved to Valencia at the age of 18, where he started painting with the D.O.C.S crew and later became part of UltraBoyz (UB). He became known for his avant-garde cursive handstyle.

Pantone began showing his work in galleries in 2006. It has since appeared on buildings, walls and in galleries worldwide, from the Mesa Contemporary Arts Center to the Long Beach Museum of Art, the Palais de Tokyo in Paris, as well as in Mexico City, Osaka, Lisbon, Palestine, Italy, and Australia. Pantone has been featured in various forms of media, including Reebok's "Always Classic" campaign. He used a 1994 Corvette as a canvas for his pixelated graphics, a piece presented in the exhibit Beyond the Streets. The piece is now known as "Ultradynamic".

== Style ==
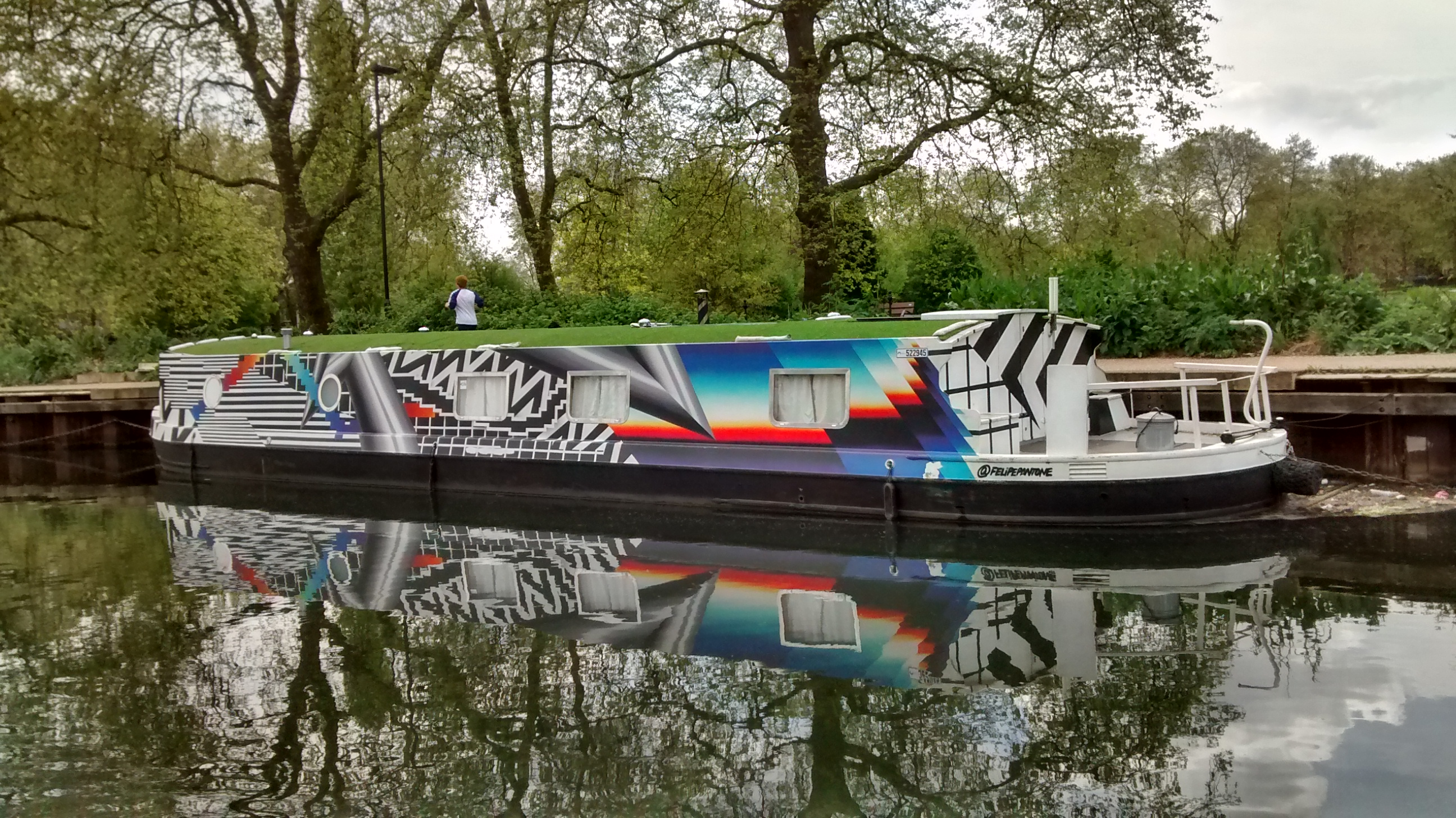
The widebeam Growbeautifully painted by Felipe Pantone

Pantone often works in gradients, blending geometric shapes with neon colors and whites, blacks, and greys, with critics noting "The divisions between geometric patterns and gradients are so effortlessly blended that the larger patterns seem created with digitization rather than with two hands." He cites the Parisian Grim Team and UltraBoyz crews as early influences.

Forbes magazine called his aesthetic "the intersection of Blade Runner and PhotoShop" for its concepts of dynamism, transformation, and movement. Others have said he has created a new visual dialogue derived from his infatuation with the digital age, comparing his work to Venezuelan Op artist Carlos Cruz-Diez's chromatic linework and the geometric graphics of Jonathan Zawada.

== Career ==
In 2019, Pantone collaborated with Hennessy on the Very Special (V.S) Limited Edition series, themed "Remixing the Present". Pantone’s vibrant, geometric design, titled "W-3 Dimensional Three Stars," incorporates historical Hennessy elements like the three-star motif and a quilted pattern, blended with neon gradients and a lightning bolt symbolizing the digital age, adorning the bottle and packaging. Containing Hennessy’s V.S cognac, a blend of 40 eaux-de-vie, the limited-edition bottle was launched globally in July 2019, celebrating the fusion of tradition and contemporary art.

Since 2020, Pantone has collaborated with Swiss watchmaker Zenith on several projects blending his kinetic art with horology. Their first project saw Pantone transform Zenith’s Le Locle manufacture facade with a vibrant mural, a first for a watchmaker. In 2021, they released the DEFY 21 Felipe Pantone, a limited-edition chronograph featuring his signature gradient colors and moiré effects, followed by a unique DEFY 21 Double Tourbillon for the 2021 Only Watch auction, which set a Zenith record at 480,000 CHF. Subsequent collaborations included the 2022 DEFY Extreme Felipe Pantone and the 2024 DEFY Skyline Tourbillon Felipe Pantone, both limited to 100 pieces, showcasing iridescent dials and lightning bolt motifs inspired by Pantone’s work.

In 2023, Pantone collaborated with Krink through a set of K-60 markers.

In 2024, Pantone collaborated with Google Arts & Culture to integrate augmented reality (AR) into his street art. Using Google’s AR Synth platform, he created interactive murals that blend physical graffiti with digital effects, allowing viewers to experience dynamic visual layers through mobile devices.

== Exhibitions ==
=== Solo exhibitions ===
==== 2015 ====
- Stereodynamica - Backwood Gallery, Melbourne AUSTRALIA
- Opticromías - Delimbo, Sevilla SPAIN
- Resituation - Constant, Hong Kong CHINA

==== 2016 ====
- Scroll Panorama - Celaya Brothers Gallery, Mexico D.F, Mexico
- Cyberspazio Tubolare - Outdoor Festival, Rome, Italy
- Data Somersault - StolenSpace Gallery, London
- Data Smog - Lebenson Gallery, Paris
- W3-Dimensional - Mirus Gallery, San Francisco, CA

==== 2017 ====
- Afterimage - Kolly Gallery, Zurich, Switzerland
- Planned Iridescence - GR Gallery, New York, NY
- Planar Direction - Station16 Gallery, Montreal, Canada
- Artifact to Human Communication - Underdogs Gallery, Lisbon, Portugal

==== 2018 ====
- Excès de Vitesse - Alice Gallery, Brussels, Belgium
- Dynamic Phenomena - Magda Danysz Gallery, Paris
- W3-DIMENSIONAL PARK - Siam Center, Bangkok, Thailand
- Transformable Systems - Joshua Liner Gallery, New York City USA

==== 2019 ====
- Axioma de Constructibilidad - Articruz, Panama City PANAMA
- Distance, Speed, Time, Formula - Danysz Gallery, Shanghai CHINA

==== 2020 ====
- Contactless - Albertz Benda, New York City USA
- Big Time Data - RGR Galery, Mexico City MEXICO

==== 2021 ====
- Casa Variable - Danysz Gallery, Paris FRANCE
- Veladura Digital - Galería Javier López & Fer Francés (The Playground), Madrid SPAIN

==== 2022 ====
- Convergencias (with Elías Crespin) - Galería RGR, CDMX MÉXICO
- Manipulable - Gallery Common, Tokyo JAPAN
- Metallic Contact - Albertz Benda, New York City USA

==== 2023 ====
- Kosmos - Control Gallery, Los Ángeles USA
- Prospective - Kunsthal, Rotterdam NL

=== Group exhibitions ===
==== 2013 ====
- Venganza – group exhibition with Sozyone Gonzalez & Demsky333 at Celal Gallery, Paris – February / March

==== 2016 ====
- Truck Art Project - Madrid, Spain
- Painting / Object - Library Street Collective, Los Angeles CA, USA
- The New Vanguard - Museum of Art and History (MOAH), Lancaster CA, USA
- Welcome Back - Colab Gallery, Wheil Am Rhein GERMANY
- Vitality and Verve - Long Beach Museum of Art, Long Beach CA, USA
- Spectra - Marion Gallery, Panama City PANAMA

==== 2017 ====
- Scope Art Fair - With Mirus Gallery, Miami, FL
- Interferences, Contemporary Op & Kinetic Art - GR Gallery, New York, NY
- Ultra-Plasticism - PBX Creativa, Madrid, Spain
- Chromadynamica Dimensional - Mesa Contemporary Arts Center, Mesa, AZ, USA

==== 2018 ====
- Summer Mixer - Joshua Liner Gallery, New York, NY
- Beyond the Streets - Los Angeles, CA
- Art from the Streets - ArtScience Museum - SINGAPORE

==== 2019 ====
- Vibrations - Danysz Gallery, Paris FRANCE
- Your Favorite Artist’s Favorite Artist II - Joshua Liner Gallery, New York City USA
- From the World, Made in Lisboa - Underdogs Gallery, Lisbon PORTUGAL
- Dream Box - MIMA Museum, Brussels BELGIUM

==== 2021 ====
- MISA.art - König Galerie, Berlin GERMANY

==== 2022 ====
- Endless Summer - Albertz Benda, Los Angeles USA

==== 2023 ====
- Beyond the Streets - Saatchi Gallery, London UK
