= Tara McPherson =

American artist based in New York (born 1976)

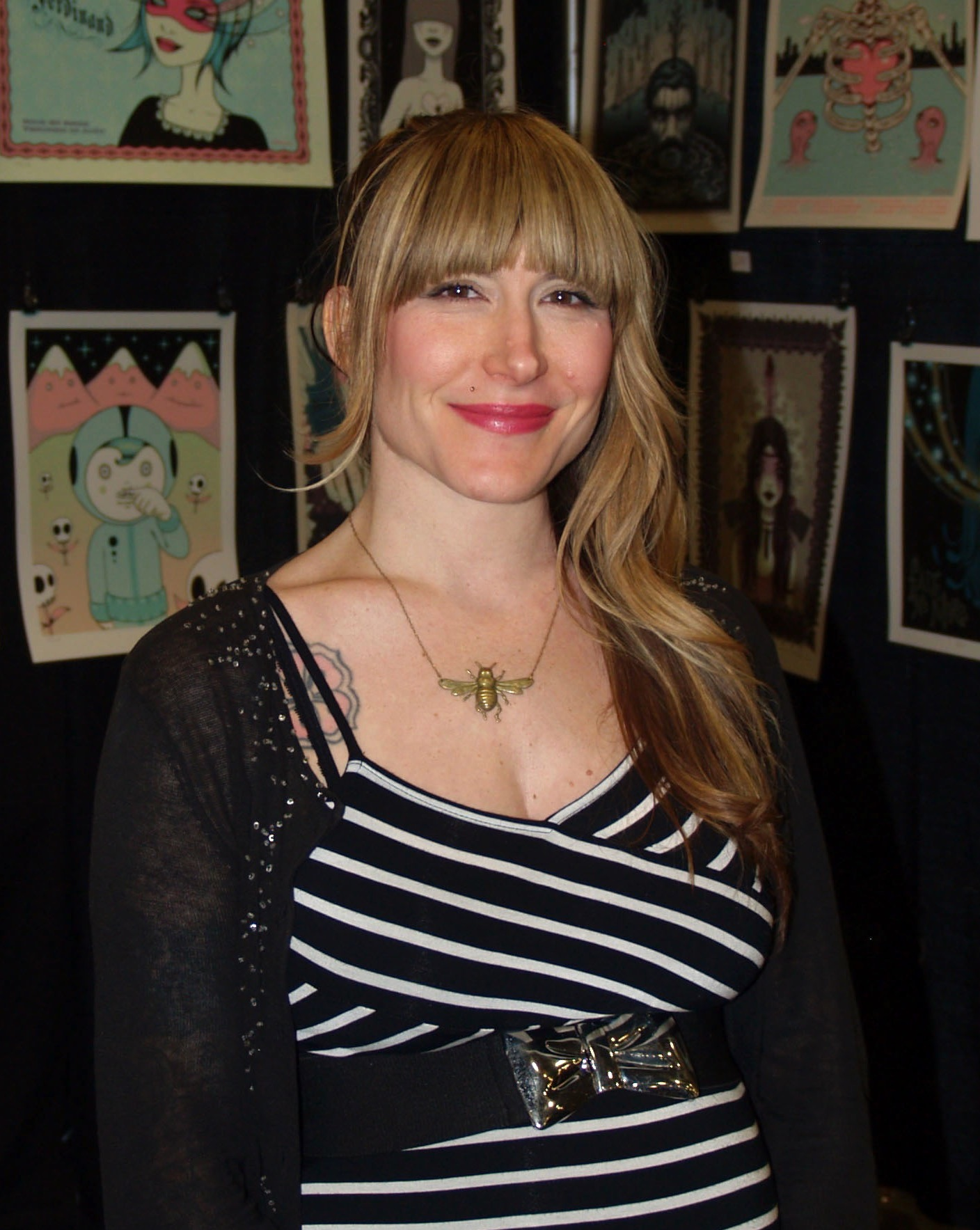
- McPherson in April 2016
- Born: Tara McPherson; April 7, 1976 (age 49); San Francisco, California
- Education: Art Center College of Design
- Known for: Painter
- Movement: New Contemporary Art
- Website: taramcpherson.com

Tara McPherson (born April 7, 1976, in San Francisco, California) is an American artist based in New York. McPherson creates paintings, murals, poster art, and designer toys, within the New Contemporary Art movement.

== Biography ==
Tara McPherson studied art at Santa Monica Community College and earned her BFA from Art Center in Pasadena, CA in August 2001 with an Illustration major and a Fine Art minor. McPherson's artwork has been featured in The New York Times, Esquire, Vanity Fair, Playboy, Elle, Marie Claire, Juxtapoz, Hi-Fructose, and the Los Angeles Times. In 2007, she won an Esky Award from Esquire for Best Concert Poster.

McPherson is married to her business partner, Sean Leonard. Together they have two children; sons Ronan born in 2012 and Orion born in 2016.

== Solo exhibitions ==
In 2006, McPherson's works were exhibited in a solo show at BLK/MARKT in Los Angeles, followed in 2008 by Lost Constellations, her first solo show at the Jonathan LeVine Gallery in New York. In 2015, Dorothy Circus Gallery hosted McPherson's first solo exhibition in Rome. In 2010 Bunny in the Moon opened at Jonathan Levine Gallery followed by Wandering Luminations in 2013.

== Art Toys ==
Tara McPherson is one of the leading female artists in the Designer Toy movement. She has collaborated with brands like Kidrobot, ToyQube, and most recently Tomenosuke and Circus Posterus. In collaboration with Kidrobot Black, she won Toy of the Year in 2012 for her Lilitu figure based on the Sumerian Myth Lilith. In 2018 she won another Designer Toy Award in the category Best Licensed Toy for her Wonder Woman Art Figure.

== Monographs ==
Published by Dark Horse Comics, Tara McPherson has released a series of Art Books.

- "Lonely Heart: The Art of Tara McPherson”
- "Lost Constellations: The Art of Tara McPherson”
- "Bunny in the Moon: The Art of Tara McPherson"
- "Wandering Luminations: The Art of Tara McPherson"
