= Dorothy Circus Gallery =

Art gallery in Rome, Italy

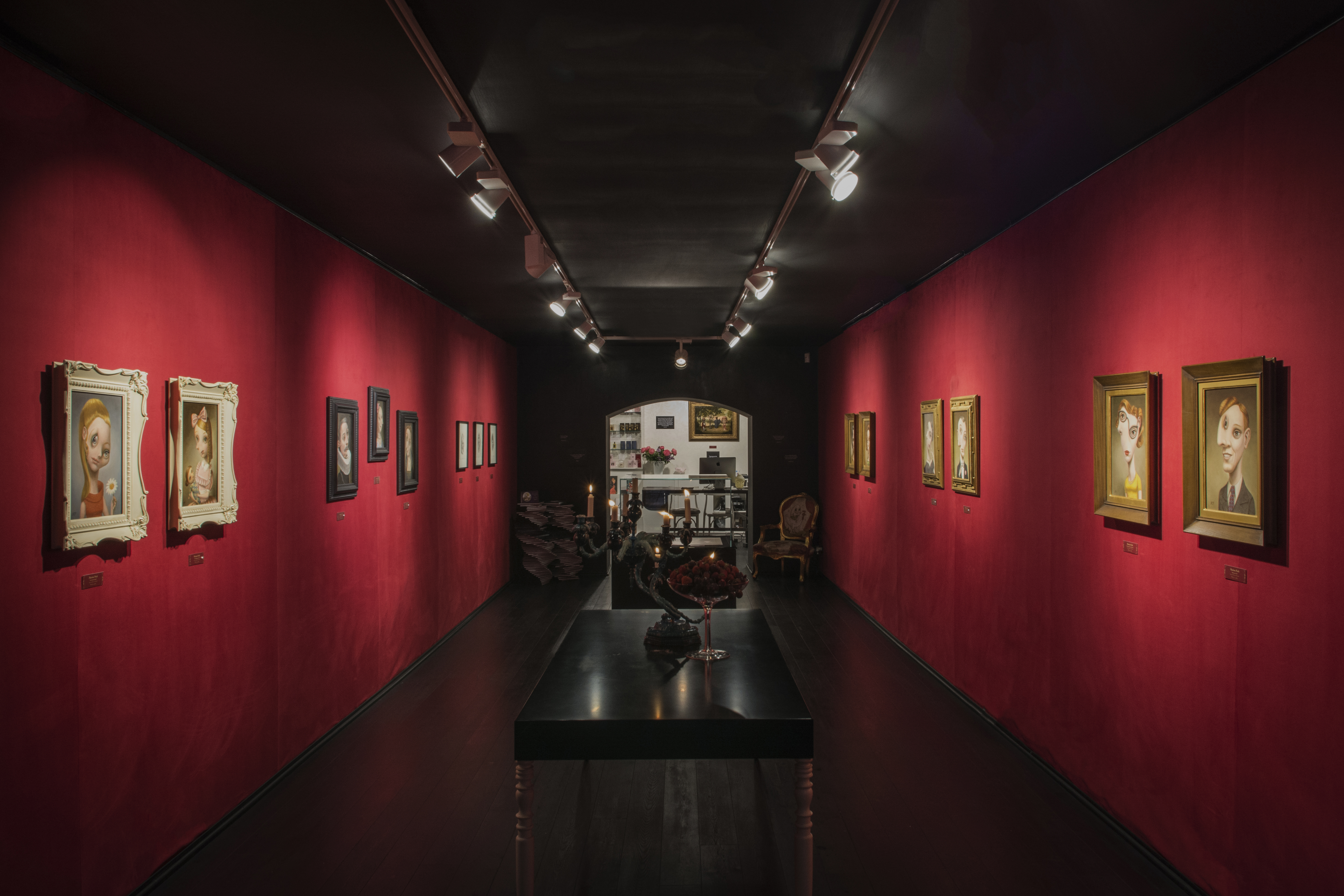
Dorothy Circus Gallery Rome

Dorothy Circus Gallery is a contemporary art gallery exhibiting artworks belonging to lowbrow, graffiti, and street art.

== Overview ==
Dorothy Circus Gallery was founded in 2007 by publisher Maddalena Di Giacomo and her daughter, Alexandra Mazzanti who is currently its sole proprietor and director. In the same year, the gallery had its first group show titled ‘Stories from the Wonderland’ featuring artists Jonathan Viner, Nathan Spoor, Sarah Joncas, Sergio Mora, J. T. Pannacciò, Andy Fluon & Aaron Jasinsky.

In 2010, Dorothy Circus Gallery curated the pop Surrealist exhibition “What a WonderFool world”, at the Museum of Palazzo Collicola in Spoleto, and other art shows at various Italian museums such as L’Acquario Romano - Casa dell’ Architettura, and Palazzo Valentini in Rome; but also a series of projects dedicated to the social sphere, among which “Spray for your Rights”, which involved artists, audience and the town council of Roma Capitale on the social and cultural issues such as Cohabitation, Minority Rights and the Protection of the Environment, ‘Spray for your rights’ with artist Eduardo Kobra, Tara McPherson, and Roa.

In 2014, the exhibition titled “The Trouble with Angels”, at Palazzo Saluzzo Paesana in Turin was dedicated to Canadian artist Ray Caesar. In the same year, Dorothy Circus Gallery has worked with publishing house Drago to produce a trilogy of books documenting over three years of Lowbrow art movement exhibitions and followed by the monograph ‘hello here I am’ about Japanese artist Kazuki Takamatsu.

In 2016, the show title “Mysterium Coniunctionis” featured work by Mark Ryden and Marion Peck. In the same year, the gallery founded the concept store Dorothy Circus Factory, with the production of “Palpitation”, a memorial perfume produced in collaboration with the Venetian perfumer Lorenzo Dante Ferro and followed by other products aimed at the senses.

In occasion of its tenth anniversary, Dorothy Circus Gallery opened their new location based in Notting Hill. This resulted in the publication of the catalogue ‘Pages from Mind travellers Diaries’ which was also the title of their 10th anniversary exhibition featuring including Peck, Travis Louie, Caesar, Joe Sorren, Camille Rose Garcia, Ryden, Miss Van, Greg ‘ Craola’ Simkins, Kris Lewis, Tara Mcpherson, Gary Basemen, Ron English, Camilla D’errico and Kobra.

== Artists ==
The gallery specializes in pop-Surrealism and exhibits contemporary artworks by artists such as Caesar, Sorren, Ryden, Peck, McPherson, Kazuki Takamatsu, Garcia, Alex Gross, Baseman, Paolo Pedroni, Van, Afarin Sajedi, and Fuco Ueda.

== Publications ==
- Pop surrealism what a wonderfool world
- City Slang
- Once Upon A Time
- Pages From Mind Travellers Diaries

== Locations ==
The gallery was founded in 2007 in Rome and in 2017 it opened its second branch in Notting Hill, London. In September 2018, the London branch moved to Connaught Village near Marble Arch in London.
