= Sara Rosen =

Sara Rosen (born 1973) is an American publisher who published Miss Rosen Editions, her own imprint, at powerHouse Books, where she was also Associate Publisher and Publicity & Marketing Director. She left after ten years to start her own company, Miss Rosen.

== Early life ==
Sara Rosen was born in Boston, Massachusetts, and moved to the Bronx in 1978. She attended Fiorello H. Laguardia High School of Music and Art as a fine art major (graduating in 1991). She received her B.A. in Art History from The City College of New York, where she graduated Phi Beta Kappa/Summa Cum Laude in 1996, and M.A. in Journalism focusing in Cultural Reporting and Criticism from New York University in 1998.

== Publishing ==
The culture of the Bronx at that time greatly influenced Rosen, who went on to publish several books about New York City in the 1970s and 1980s under her imprint, Miss Rosen Editions, with powerHouse Books including the legendary hip-hop epic, Wild Style by Charles Ahearn (2007), "Do Not Give Way to Evil: Photographs of the South Bronx, 1979–1987" by Lisa Kahane (2008), "It’s Just Begun: The Epic Journey of DJ Disco Wiz, Hip Hop’s First Latino DJ" by Ivan Sanchez and DJ Disco Wiz (2009), "Vandal Squad: Inside the New York City Transit Police Department, 1984–2004" by Joseph Rivera (2008), and "New York State of Mind" by Martha Cooper (2007)

== Event production ==
Growing up in New York City in the 1970s and 1980s inspired Rosen to curate "That 70s Show: New York City in the 1970s", a 50-artist exhibition at The powerHouse Arena, Brooklyn, in March 2007 and edit an edition of power House.

During her time at powerHouse Books, Rosen helped to produce historic events including "We B*Girlz: A 25th Anniversary Breakin’ Event" at Lincoln Center Out Doors with hip-hop documentary photographer Martha Cooper on August 10, 2006. The event featured an all-star international line-up of female performers, participants and judges. Emceed by Toni Blackman of New York, and featuring music spun by DJ Sparkles of Philadelphia, We B*Girlz showcased a 3-on-3 battle between four crews: Fox Force Five of New York City; Natural Born Killahz of New Jersey; Style Comes First of Philadelphia; and Flowzaic of London. There were also performances by popper/locker Rowdy of Flowzaic as well as a group show by members of Keep Risin’ to the Tops, a dance troupe based in Spanish Harlem. The judges included Rokafella of New York; Asia One of Los Angeles; and Aruna of Rotterdam. The backdrop was painted by graffiti legend Lady Pink along with Toofly and Muck.

== Graffiti culture ==
Rosen produced the first public conversation between former graffiti writers and NYPD Vandal Squad officers, held at the powerHouse Arena on March 19, 2009, to provide an open forum for public discussion to discuss the issues regarding the methods that the Vandal Squad employs and their impact on the lives of the writers themselves. Panelists included Vandal Squad author Joseph Rivera, former Commanding Officer Lieutenant Steven Mona, original Vandal Squad Lieutenant Ken Chiulli, graffiti artist COPE2, graffiti activist Ket, and street artist Ellis Gallagher. The event was moderated by Stern Rockwell, Streets Are Saying Things.

Rosen also helped to produce the February 24, 2005 graffiti episode of NBC’s The Apprentice, which was inspired by the book Autograf: New York City’s Graffiti Writers by Peter Sutherland.
