= Brian Adam Douglas =

American artist (born 1972)

- Born: Brian Adam Douglas; June 16, 1972 (age 54); Garland, Texas
- Education: School of Visual Arts

Brian Adam Douglas (born 1972) is a Brooklyn-based multidisciplinary artist whose practices include monumental woodcuts, stencils, large scale drawings and collage. Douglas executes street art under the name "Elbow-Toe" and has since exhibited in galleries.

== Early life and education ==
Douglas was born in Garland, Texas and was raised in Plano, Texas. At eighteen he moved to New York City to attend the School of Visual Arts where he graduated in 1994.

== Career ==
=== Street art ===
Douglas’ work first came to the public's attention through his street art—wheat-pasted collages and chalk drawings made under the name Elbow-Toe. As his street art evolved from simple character designs to more complex collages and linocuts, Douglas began to draw the attention of the gallery world, progressing to group shows in London, Los Angeles and New York .

=== Cut Paper Paintings ===
Beginning in 2007, Douglas began exhibiting works made entirely out of paper. He refers to his process as paper paintings rather than as collage. "I see each piece of paper as a brushstroke rather than as a juxtaposed idea." The cut paper paintings developed out of a desire to produce work for the street that would be easier to produce, but over time the process became much more labor-intensive, with most pieces taking between three and six months to produce.

=== Interactive Art ===
Beginning in 2015, Douglas began programming interactive artworks in JavaScript and HTML5, and he began releasing them in 2016 on the ENDGAMES Interactive website. The premier release was titled Obsessive Compulsive Disorder.

== Exhibitions ==
- 2007: O’ Wise King How Long Will You Last, Leonard Street Gallery, London, UK
- 2011: Due Date, Black Rat Projects, London, UK; Warrington Museum, Warrington, UK
- 2013: How To Disappear Completely, Andrew Edlin Gallery, New York, NY
- 2014: Liner Notes, R Jampol Projects, New York, NY

== Bibliography ==
- Douglas, Brian Adam (2011). Paper Cuts (1 ed.). Drago. p. 86. ISBN 978-88-88493-77-0. Archived from the original on 2014-10-20.
