= Jago (sculptor) =

Italian sculptor

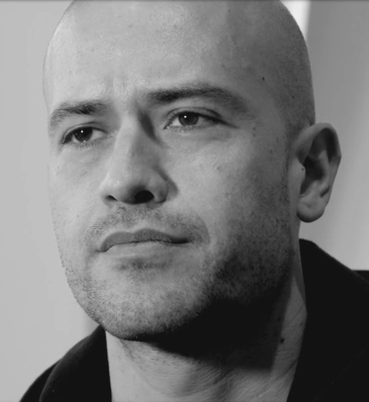
- Jago in 2022
- Born: Jacopo Cardillo; 1987 (age 37–38); Frosinone, Italy
- Known for: Sculpture
- Notable work: Habemus Hominem
- Website: https://jago.art/en/

Jacopo Cardillo (born 1987), known as Jago, is an Italian sculptor. He is known for a sculpture of Pope Benedict XVI that was modified to remove his clothing when he abdicated, named Habemus Hominem.

== Early life and education ==
He attended art high school and then Accademia di Belle Arti di Frosinone until 2010.

== Works ==
- Habemus Hominem
- The First Baby
- Look Down
- The Veiled Son
- Pietà
- Aiace e Cassandra
