= Erwin Olaf =

Dutch photographer (1959–2023)

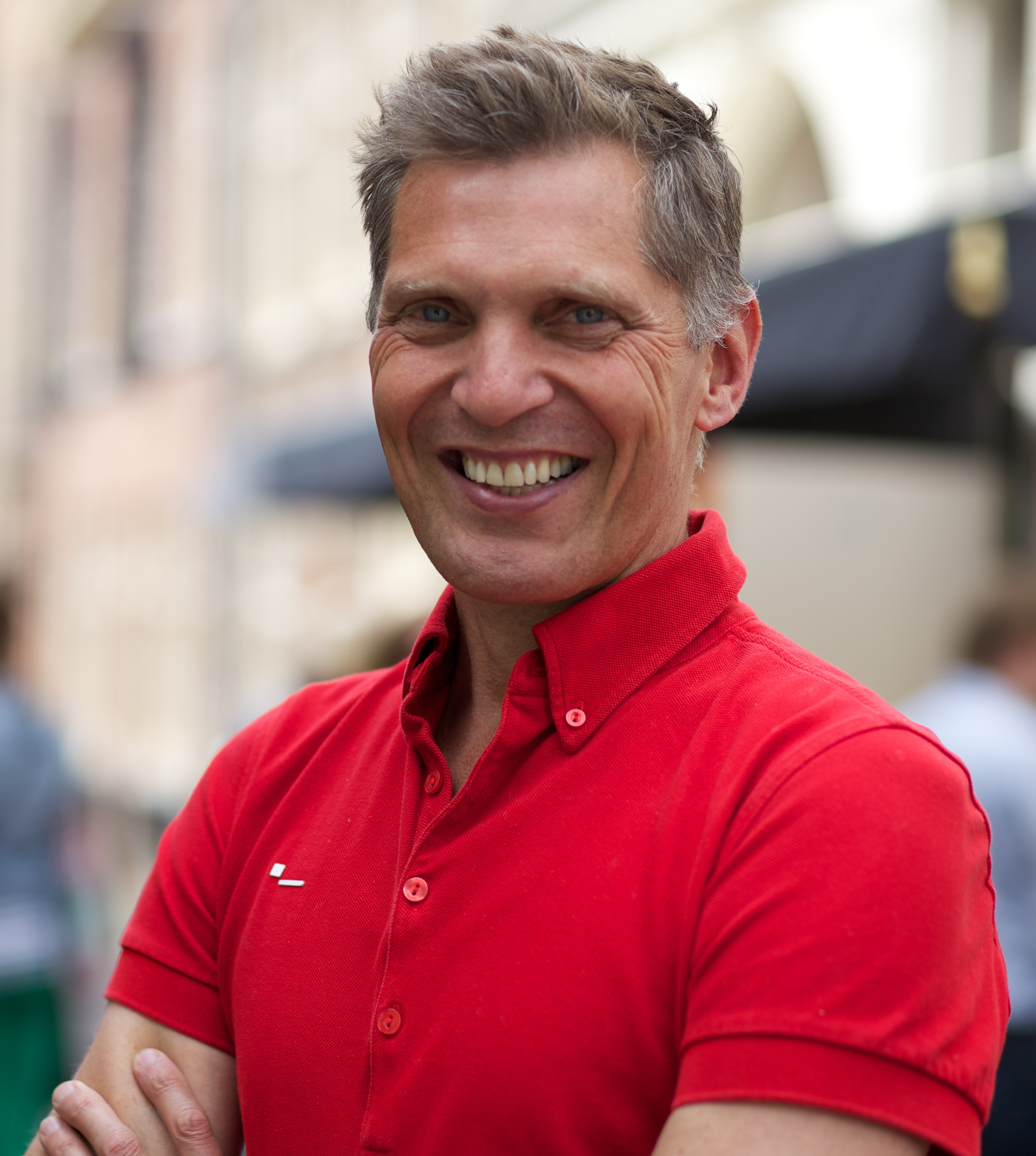
- Olaf in 2012
- Born: Erwin Olaf Springveld; 2 July 1959; Hilversum, Netherlands
- Died: 20 September 2023 (aged 64); Groningen, Netherlands
- Occupation: Photographer

Erwin Olaf Springveld (2 July 1959 – 20 September 2023), professionally known as Erwin Olaf, was a Dutch photographer from Hilversum. Time magazine described his work as straddling "the worlds of commercial, art and fashion photography at once".

== Biography ==
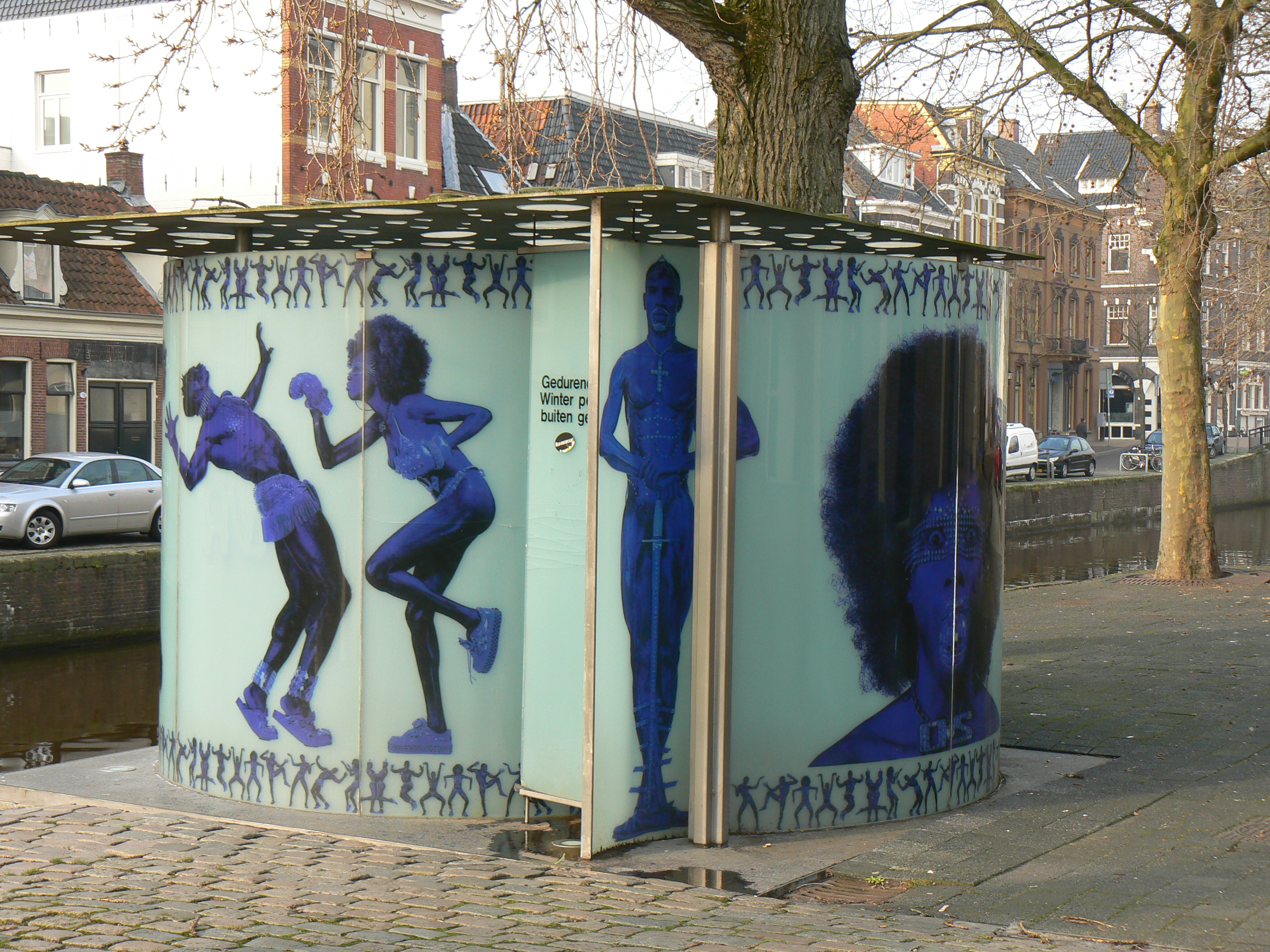
Public toilets designed by Rem Koolhaas and Erwin Olaf in Groningen

Erwin Olaf Springveld was born on 2 July 1959 in Hilversum, Netherlands.

Olaf was most famous for his commercial and personal work. He was commissioned to photograph advertising campaigns for large international companies such as Levi's, Microsoft, and Nokia. Some of his most famous photographic series include "Grief", "Rain", and "Royal Blood". Never one to shy away from controversy, Olaf's work was often daring and provocative. Humorously however, one of his early photographs was once expelled from a show on the basis of not containing nudity.

His work received many awards and has been exhibited around the world.

Olaf studied journalism at the School of Journalism in Utrecht. His work was shown in galleries and museums all internationally, for example at Wagner + Partner, Berlin; Flatland Gallery, Amsterdam; Hamiltons Gallery, London; Galerie Magda Danysz, Paris; Gallery Espacio Minimo, Madrid; Stedelijk Museum, Amsterdam; Galerie Ron Mandos, Amsterdam; and many others.

Olaf designed the 2014 Dutch euro coins with the portrait of King Willem-Alexander. In 2018, he was responsible for the official portraits of the Dutch royal family.

He was an advocate for gay rights. In 2012 he organized a "kiss in" that had around a hundred participants after a snack bar owner had commented on Olaf kissing his boyfriend.

Olaf died on 20 September 2023, at the age of 64, as a result of long-term emphysema weeks after receiving a lung transplant. Olaf was first diagnosed with emphysema in 1996. He had predicted what the illness would do to him in the third panel of his 2009 self-portrait series I wish, I am, I will be. The Longfonds, the Dutch non-profit organisation for lung patients, called it very brave that he had been so open about his illness.

== Exhibitions ==
- 2026:
- Tender Fury, Galerie Ron Mandos, Amsterdam
- 2025:
  - Stedelijk Museum, Amsterdam - Solo Exhibition: Freedom
  - A Suspended Tomorrow, 212 Photography, Istanbul, Turkey
  - IN MEMORIAM: ERWIN OLAF (1959-2023), PACI Contemporary Gallery, Brescia, Italy
  - Nowhere but the Night, Galerie Ron Mandos, Amsterdam
- 2024:
  - Bigger Than Life, Hamiltons Gallery, London, UK
  - Erwin Olaf, Kong Gallery, Seoul, South Korea
  - Erwin Olaf: Stages, Houk Gallery, New York, USA
  - Erwin Olaf: Narratives of Emancipation, Desire and Intimacy, Centro Cultural De La Villa, Madrid, Spain
- 2021:
  - Munich Kunsthalle - Solo Exhibition: Unheimlich schön (irreally beautiful)
- 2019:
  - Anniversary Solo Show, Gemeente Museum The Hague & The Hague Museum of Photography, The Hague, The Netherlands
  - Palm Springs Unseen, Flatland, Amsterdam
- 2017:
  - Album 13 d'Indochine, Galerie Rabouan Moussin, Paris, France
  - Human&Nature, Gallery Kong, Seoul, Republic of Korea
- 2016:
  - Erwin Olaf - Four Series, Centro de Arte Contemporaneo de Málaga, Málaga, Spain
  - Cell of Emotions, National Art Gallery, Sofia, Bulgaria
  - Homage Louis Gallait, The Pushkin State Museum of Fine Arts, Moscow, Russia
- 2015:
  - A Corps Perdu, Magda Danysz Gallery, Paris
  - Erwin Olaf: The Empire of Illusion, Museo de Arte Contemporaine de Rosario, Rosario, Argentina
  - Waiting, Flatland, Amsterdam
  - "Retrospective," Fondation Oriente Museu, Macau, Chine
- 2014:
  - Art & Fashion, Magda Danysz Gallery, Paris
- 2013:
  - "Erwin Olaf - Berlin," Rabouan Moussion Gallery, Paris
  - "Erwin Olaf - Waiting," Rabouan Moussion Gallery, Paris
  - "Émotions - Installations," La Sucrière, Lyon
  - "Berlin," Hasted Kraeutler Gallery, New York
  - "Berlin," Hamiltons Gallery, Londres
- 2012:
  - The Dark Side, Rabouan Moussion Gallery, Paris
  - "Works 2000 - 2010," Art Statements Gallery, Hong Kong
  - "Erwin Olaf," Kong Gallery, Séoul
  - "Short Stories," Wagner Gallery, Berlin
- 2011:
  - "Erwin Olaf," Art Statements Gallery, Tokyo
  - "Paradise the club," Rabouan Moussion Gallery, Paris
  - "High Tension," Carbon, Dubaï
  - "Captured senses," Cer Modern, Ankara
  - "Erwin Olaf," Nordic Light International Festival of Photography, Kristiansund
- 2010:
  - "Erwin Olaf Hotel," Magda Danysz Gallery, Paris
  - "Erwin Olaf Hotel," Paris-Benijing Gallery, Pékin
  - "Erwin Olaf - Recent Work," Hamiltons Gallery, Londres
  - "Hotel, Dawn & Dusk," Hasted Kraeutler Gallery, New York
- 2009 :
  - Dusk, Flatland, Amsterdam
  - "Série Laboral Escena," Magda Danysz Gallery, Paris
  - "Rain, Hope, Grief & Fall," Institut Netherlands, Paris
  - "Darts of Pleasure," Domus Artium Museum, Salamanque
  - "Moving Targets," Haifa Museum of Art, Haïfa

== Honours ==
National

- Medal of Honour for Science and Arts (13 March 2023).
