= Santa Marta al Collegio Romano =

Church building in Rome, Italy

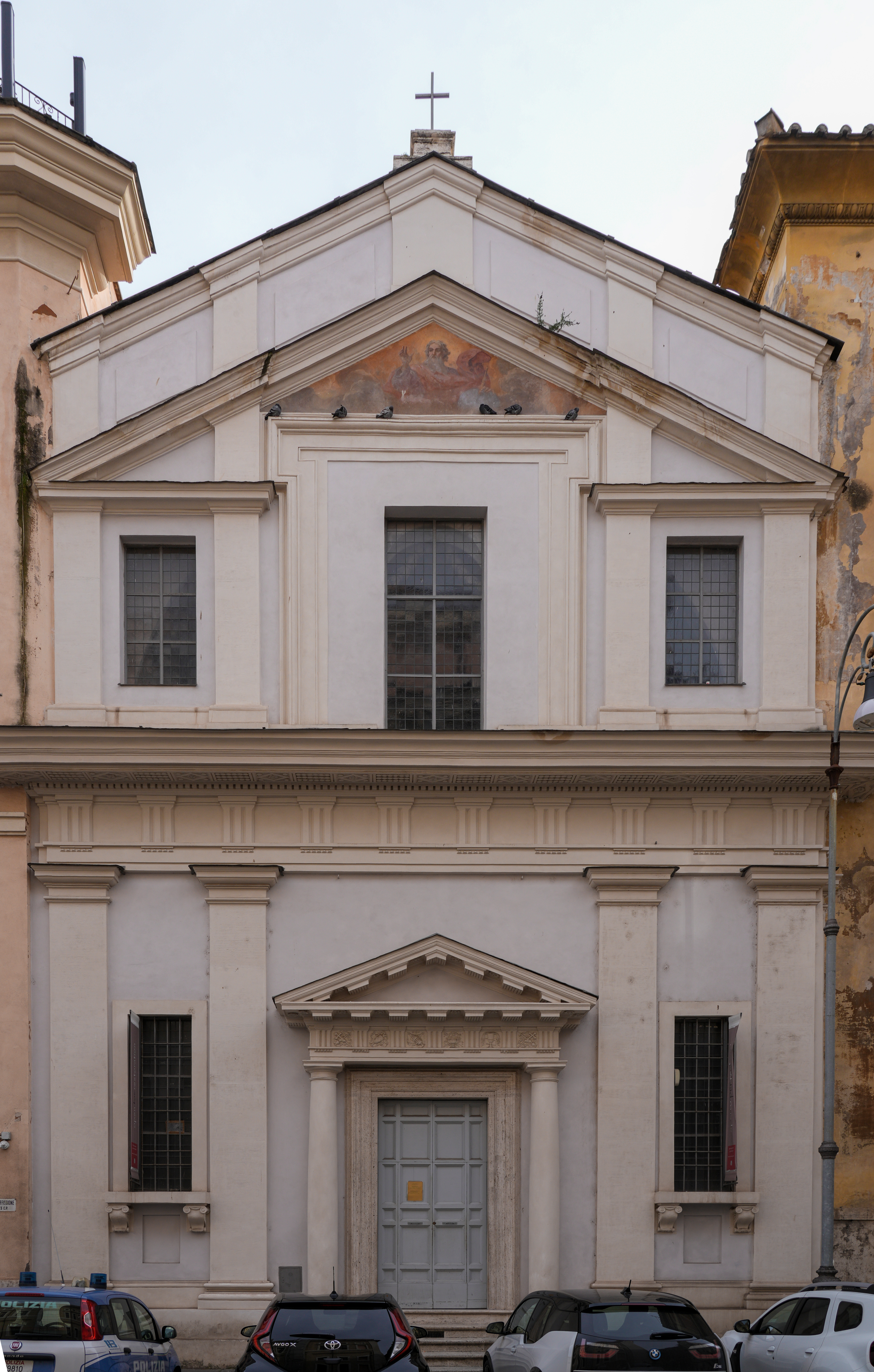
- Façade
- Click on the map for a fullscreen view
- 41°53′51″N 12°28′48″E
- Location: Rome
- Country: Italy

History
- Consecrated: 1696

Architecture
- Functional status: cultural center
- Architectural type: Church
- Groundbreaking: 1543

Santa Marta al Collegio Romano is a deconsecrated church located in the Piazza del Collegio Romano in the Rione Pigna of Rome, Italy.

== History ==
A House of Saint Martha was founded in 1543 by St Ignatius of Loyola to rehabilitate women considered of poor morals, because they were adulterous or "married women shamelessly living in public sin without fear of God or men". Saint Martha is considered the patron saint of married women. The church became a monastery, and by 1560 had come under the Augustinian order. The church was consecrated in 1696, and was reconstructed by Carlo Fontana. Deconsecrated by Napoleonic invasions, it functions as a cultural center.

The interior art has been mostly transferred. Some stucco and architectural decoration remains. The ceiling is frescoed by Baciccio.

== Sources ==
- M. Armellini, Le chiese di Roma dal secolo IV al XIX, Roma 1891
- C. Hulsen, Le chiese di Roma nel Medio Evo, Firenze 1927
- Gazeteer

== See also ==
- List of Jesuit sites
