= Miss Van =

French painter

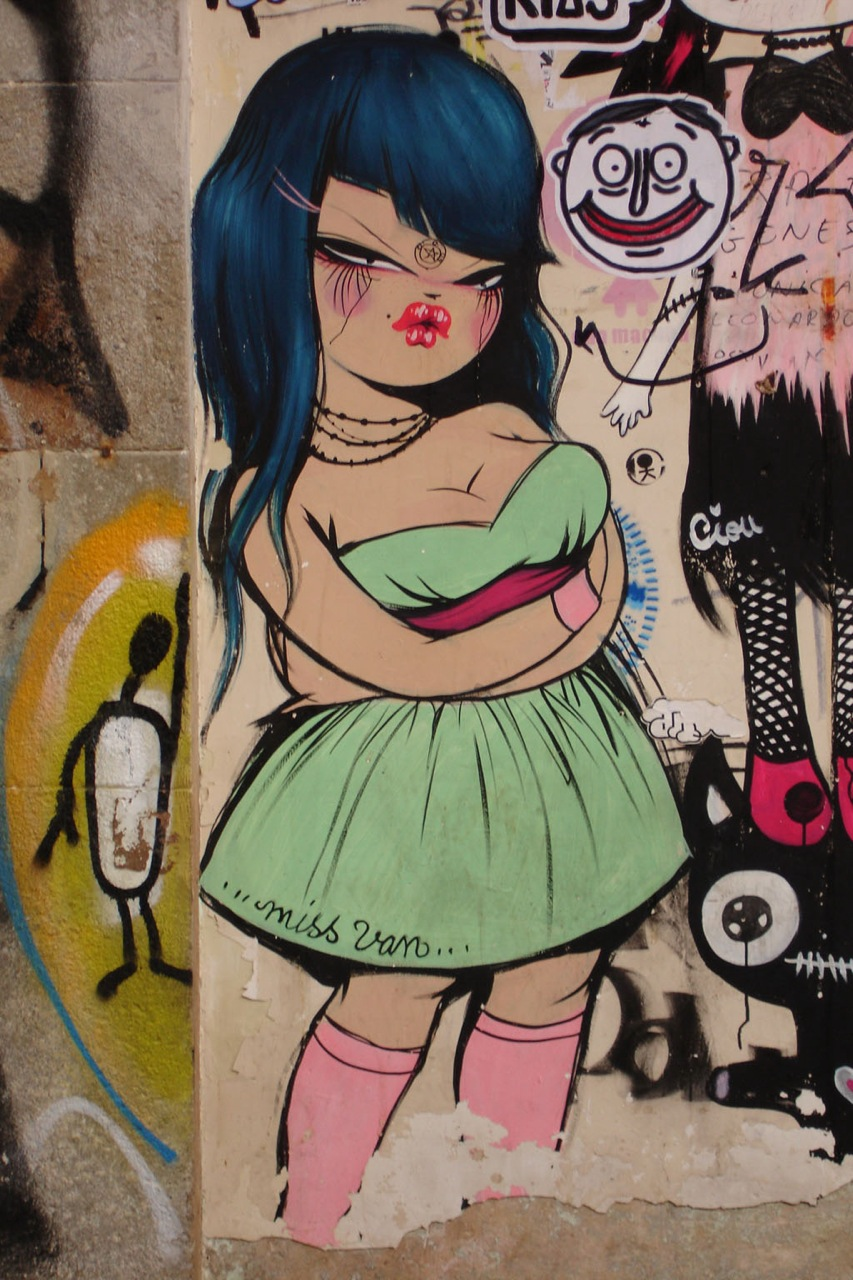
- Artwork by Miss Van on a wall of La Boqueria in Ciutat Vella, Barcelona
- Born: Vanessa Alice; 1973 (age 51–52); Toulouse, France
- Known for: Poupées
- Style: Feminine
- Movement: Street art
- Website: missvan.com

Miss Van (born 1973 in Toulouse, France), also known as Vanessa Alice, is a graffiti and street artist. Miss Van started painting on the street of Toulouse alongside Mademoiselle Kat at the age of 18. Today, she is now internationally known as a street and fine artist. Primarily, her work is marked by the use of unique characters, called poupées, or dolls. Miss Van's work has appeared on streets internationally, although she also exhibits canvases in galleries across France, Europe and the United States. Today, her work is characterized by both street art and fine art, blurring the lines between both worlds.

Miss Van currently resides in Barcelona and has written and published several books with the publishing house Drago and coordinated several art shows across Europe. She remains one of the most famous female street and graffiti artists in the world, recognized as one of the top figures in early 21st-century street art canon.

== Artwork ==
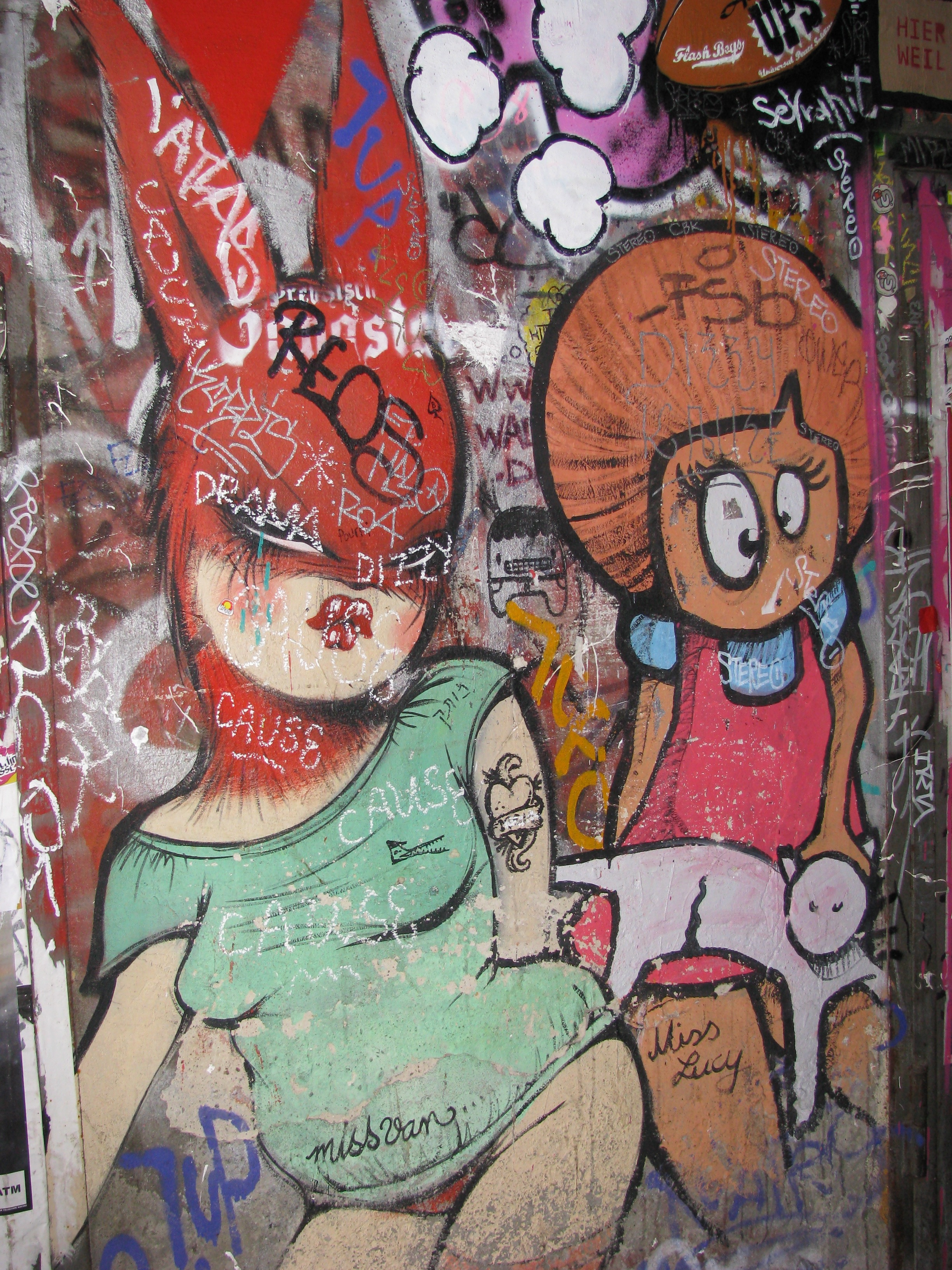
Miss Van with El Bocho's Little Lucy, Berlin 2009

In her artwork, Miss Van typically depicts sloe-eyed women, covering a varied array of female forms and expressing many different emotions. Common themes in her work include eroticism, sexuality, desire and innocence which are represented by animal masks, pastel colors, and revealing clothing. Miss Van's work illustrates a cartoonish, dream-like world of female sexuality. Over time the stylization of the women has changed, reflecting Miss Van's artistic and personal evolution as she has grown and matured. This change is paralleled in Miss Van's increased preference for the gallery over the street. In the gallery, Miss Van embraces enclosed and intimate gallery space as part of the artistic experience .

Between 2008 and 2016, Miss Van exhibited artwork in private galleries in Shanghai, London, Rome, Berlin, Paris and Vienna. In North America, she has held shows in Detroit, Santa Monica, Los Angeles, Montreal, Chicago and New York. Notable shows include, Still a Little Magic at Upper Playground, San Francisco in 2008; Cachetes Colorados at Upper Playground, Mexico City in 2010; and A Moment in Time at Saatchi Gallery, London in 2016. The same year, Miss Van also showed at the Atmossphere Biennale in Moscow, where she exhibited a woven wool rug based on an original painting.

== Critical reception ==
Thematically, her work has provoked a negative reaction from some feminists due to the portrayal of women in her graffiti. Although she receives this backlash, her reasoning for her painting is more personal. "Painting on walls was a way to show that I was boycotting the conventional art world". Despite negative critique of her work, some critics perceive her portrayal of sexuality and feminity as a powerful rejection of male supremacy and male-dominated art. Her work is also appreciated for centering women and increasing the representation of women in street art. Furthermore, the depiction of a full-figured female form in Miss Van's work is representative of body positive politics. Miss Van is regarded as one of the most famous female graffiti and street artists in the world, a genre that is generally considered as having few female artists.

In 2016, Miss Van held her first institutional art show at Centro de Arte Contemporáneo de Málaga in Spain, titled "For The Wind in My Hair." The show featured 39 original paintings on canvas. Artnet News calls the show as "interesting discourse between the worlds of fine art and street art." Miss Van also displays how meaning changes between these two artistic sites, the street and the gallery.

== Publications ==
=== Books ===
- Wild at Heart (2012) Drago
- Twinkles (2011) Drago

=== Books with contributions by Miss Van ===
- Pop Surrealism: What a Wonderfool World (2010) Drago
- Dorothy Circus Gallery Trilogy: Walk on the Wild Side (2013) Drago

== Exhibits ==
2014 – Miss Van: Glamorous Darkness, StolenSpace Gallery, London – Solo Show

2014 – Spectrum: Winter Group Show, StolenSpace Gallery, London – Group Show

2014 – Art Truancy: Celebrating 20 Years of Juxtapoz Magazine, Johnathan LeVine Projects – Group Show

2014 – StolenSpace Gallery at SCOPE Miami Beach 2014 – Fair

2015 – The Reasons for the Seasons, StolenSpace Gallery, London – Group Show

2015 – FESTIN DE ARTE at Isabelle Croxatto Galleria, Isabelle Croxatto Galleria, Santiago – Group Show

2015 – 'Freedom' a Group Show, StolenSpace Gallery, Berlin – Group Show

2015 – FIFTY24MX at LA Art Show 2015 – Fair

2016 – Ch. ACO'16, Isabel Croxatto Galería, Santiago – Group Show

2016 – Isabel Croxatto Galeria at Contemporary Istanbul 2016, Şişli – Fair

2017 – Flor de Piel, Victor Lope Arte Contemporaneo, Barcelona – Solo Show

2017 – Welcome to New Jersey, Jonathan LeVine Projects, Jersey City – Group Show

2017 – Isabel Croxatto Galeria at Art Central 2017 – Fair
