= JonOne =

American artist

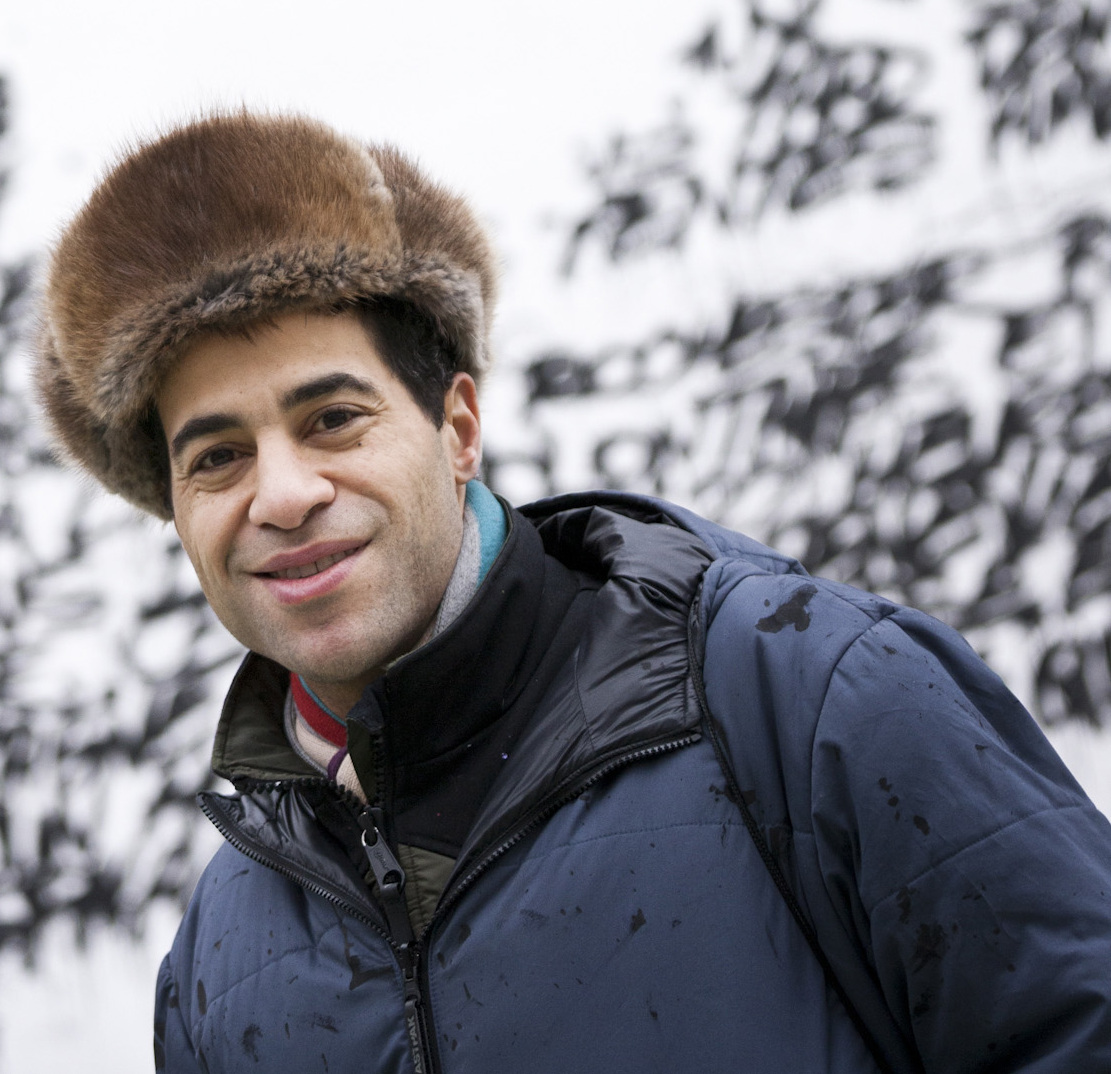
- JonOne in front of his mural tribute to Abbé Pierre, 2011
- Born: John Andrew Perello; November 30, 1963 (age 62); New York City, U.S.
- Resting place: Paris, Paris, France
- Style: Graffiti; Abstract; street art
- Movement: Abstract Expressionism
- Website: jonone.com

Tag
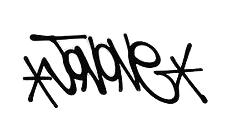

JonOne (born John Andrew Perello, 30 November 1963), also known as Jon156, is an American graffiti artist. Originally from New York, he lives and works in Paris.

== Early life and upbringing ==
JonOne was born in New York's Harlem neighborhood to parents from the Dominican Republic. Growing up in Harlem, his introduction to street art began when he would see graffiti and tags on subway cars and city walls. When he was 17 years old, he entered the world of graffiti with his childhood friend "White Man," tagging his name Jon with the numbers 156 on walls and trains in his neighborhood. JonOne said, "The subway is a museum that runs through the city."

In 1984, JonOne founded the graffiti group 156 All Starz, in order to bring together their passion for painting trains at night and to help forget about their problems, including drug use. At this time, he met the artist Bando, who was living in New York. Following an invitation from Bando, JonOne moved to Paris in 1987.

== Career ==
JonOne began his work as a painter on canvas in a workshop at the Hospital Ephemeral, a literal hospital building that became a squatting place for artists, located in the 18th arrondissement of Paris. Here, he painted with the artists A-One, Sharp, Ash (Victor Ash), Jayone and Skki.

JonOne made a name for himself in Parisian artistic circles through his work on canvas and the exhibitions he held, including one in 1990 at Gallery 45 Gleditsch in Berlin and the exhibition Graffiti Paris, at rue Chapon in Paris.

At an Artcurial auction on June 6, 2007, Match Point, a large canvas by JonOne made at the Hospital Ephemeral in 1993, was bought by a New York collector for €24,800, a record sale for the artist. This auction was also the highest bid ever obtained in France for a work of graffiti art.. Since 2013, JonOne has enriched its creation by collaborating with Didier Marien from the Boccara Gallery on an important series of street art rugs.

== Bibliography ==
- JonOne, Da Sun Will Always Shine, Galerie Le Feuvre, 2011, 51 p.
- JonOne, My Father's Keeper, Galerie Le Feuvre, 2010, 52 p.
- Never Lucas et JonOne, Maï / Jonone, Drago Arts & Communication, et al. "36 Chambers", 2009, 96 p. ( ISBN 978-8888493480 )
- JonOne, JonOne Rock, Drago Arts & Communication, 2009, 40 p. ( ISBN 978-8888493510 )
- JonOne, Carved In Stone, Galerie Brugier-Rigail, 2010, 96 p.
- JonOne, Black Diamonds, Speerstra Gallery, 2002, 28 p.
- JonOne, Night and Day, Speerstra Gallery, 2004, 24 p.
- JonOne, Follow the Sun, Speerstra Gallery, 2008, 24 p.
- JonOne, The Chronicles, David Pluskwa gallery, 2015, 352p
- JonOne, Birth of the Wind, Galerie Brugier-Rigail, 2018
- JonOne, Poetry in Motion, Galerie Brugier-Rigail, 2019
- JonOne, Monographie, Skira édition, 2019, 204p
- JonOne, Journal Intime (livre en édition limité - 500) 2020
- JonOne, Obsession, (livre en édition limitée - 300), 2020
