= Vhils =

Portuguese graffiti and street artist

Vhils CvSE
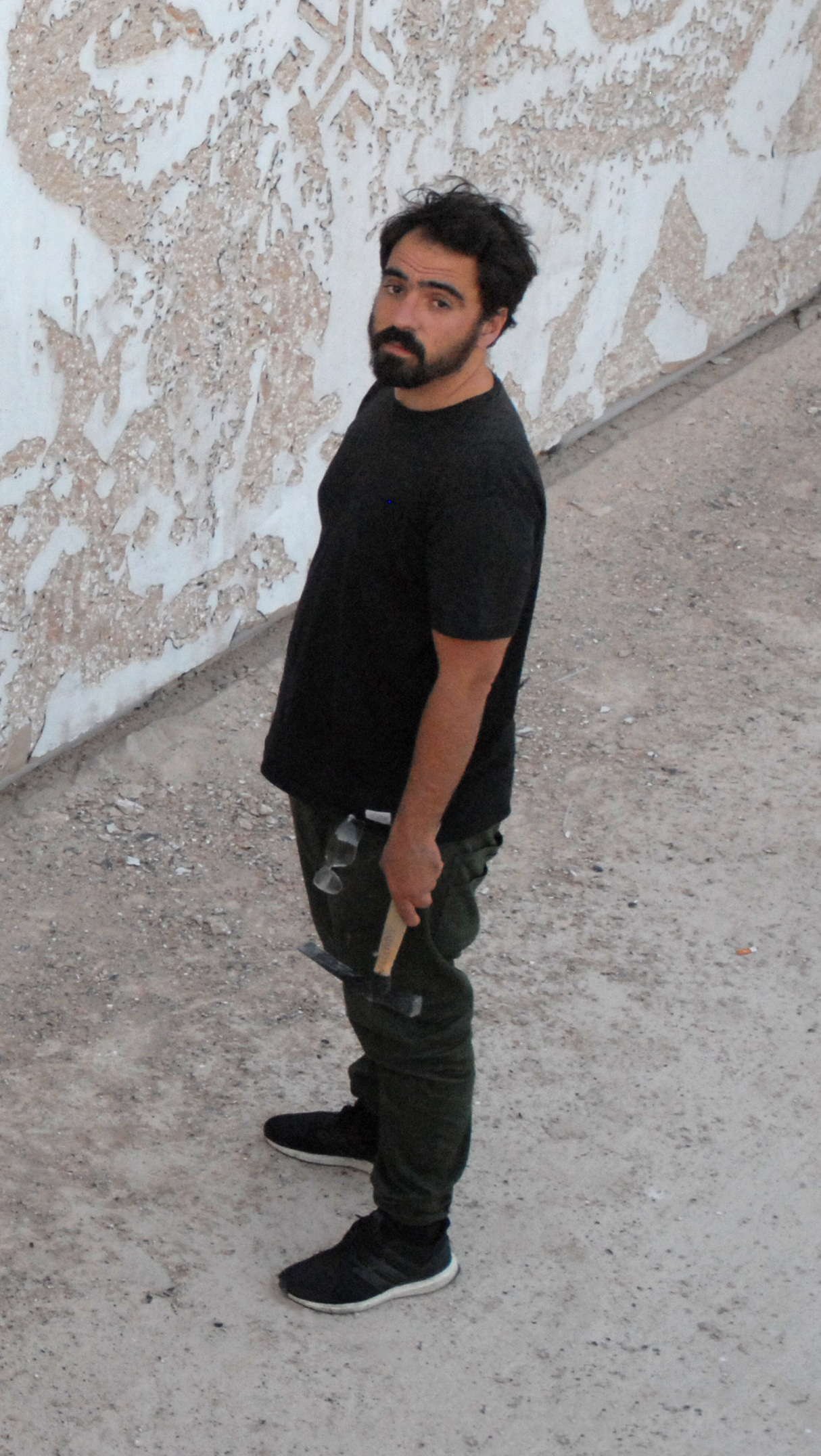
- Vhils in 2017 in Beja, Portugal
- Born: Alexandre Farto; 1987 (age 38–39); Lisbon, Lisbon District, Third Portuguese Republic
- Education: Byam Shaw School of Art
- Style: Street art
- Movement: Graffiti
- Website: vhils.com

Tag
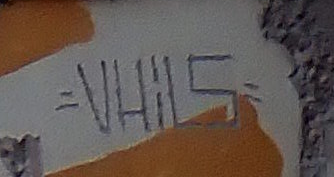

Vhils is the tag of Portuguese graffiti and street artist Alexandre Manuel Dias Farto (born 1987).

== Life ==
Farto was born in Portugal in 1987. He studied at the Byam Shaw School of Art in London. Vhils lives and works in London and Lisbon. He gained prominence when his work of a face carved into a wall appeared alongside a picture by street artist Banksy at the Cans Festival in London in 2008. A photograph of him creating the work appeared on the front page of The Times.

He was later given space to show his work by Banksy's agent, Steve Lazarides. Several of his works were published in 2008. He is also shown by Vera Cortes and the Magda Danysz Gallery.

During Fremantle's 2013 Fremantle Street Arts Festival, the Norfolk Hotel was decorated with an original image of the first Australian female senator. The image of Dame Dorothy Tangney DBE was created by Vhils and his assistants.

Luxembourg Freeport, an art storage facility opened in 2014, includes a large mural by Vhils, etched into one of the atrium concrete walls.

In 2023, the Hotel Artsys Cascais was inaugurated, with a facade designed by Vhils. That same year, he painted a mural for UNESCO headquarters. It was the first work of street art to be added to the walls of UNESCO.

Vhils has travelled to many places around the world, trying to reveal the stories that lie within the walls.

== Main Work ==
=== Gallery ===
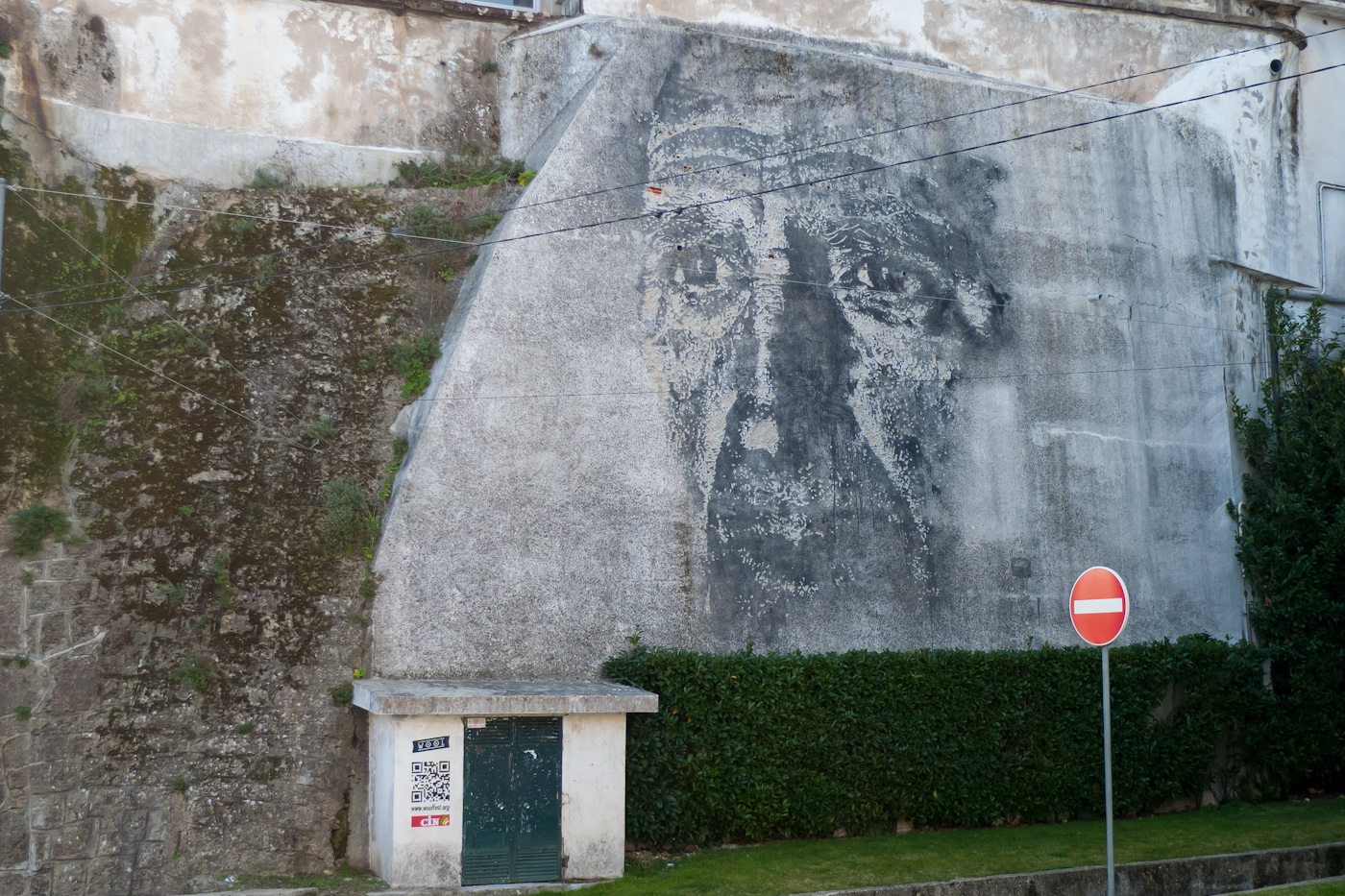
Vhils artwork in Covilhã

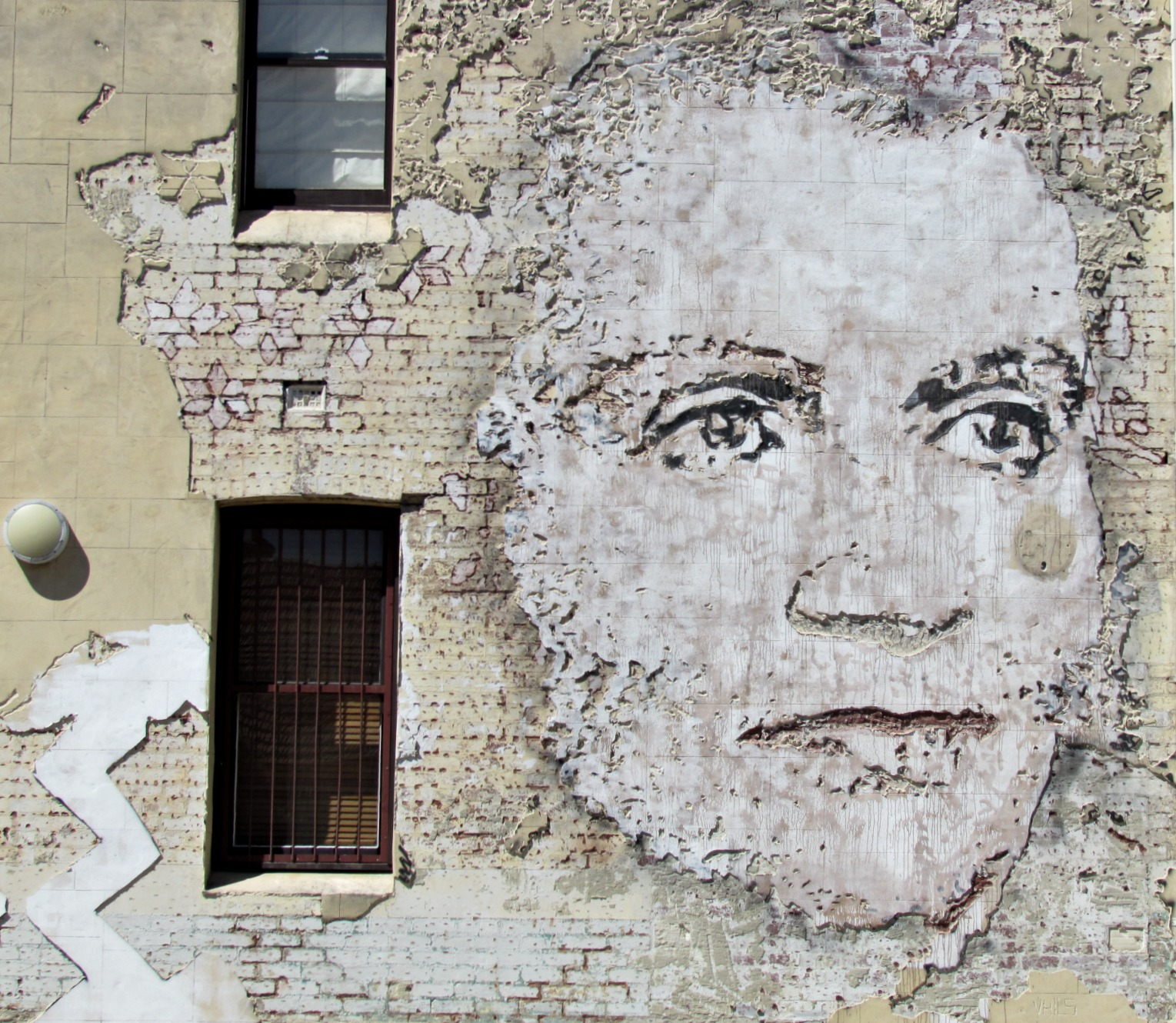
Dame Dorothy Tangney DBE in Fremantle

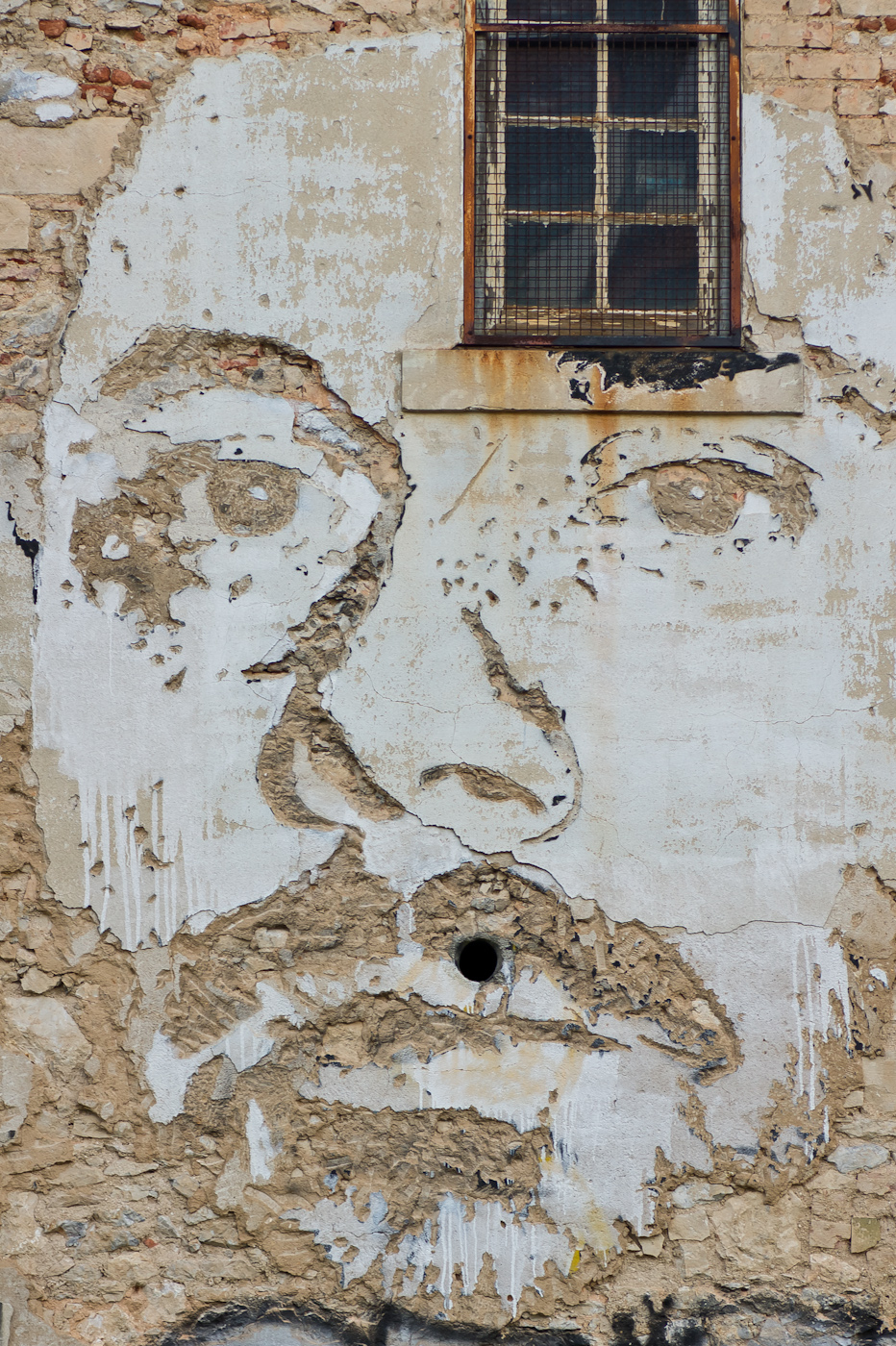
Self-portrait mural

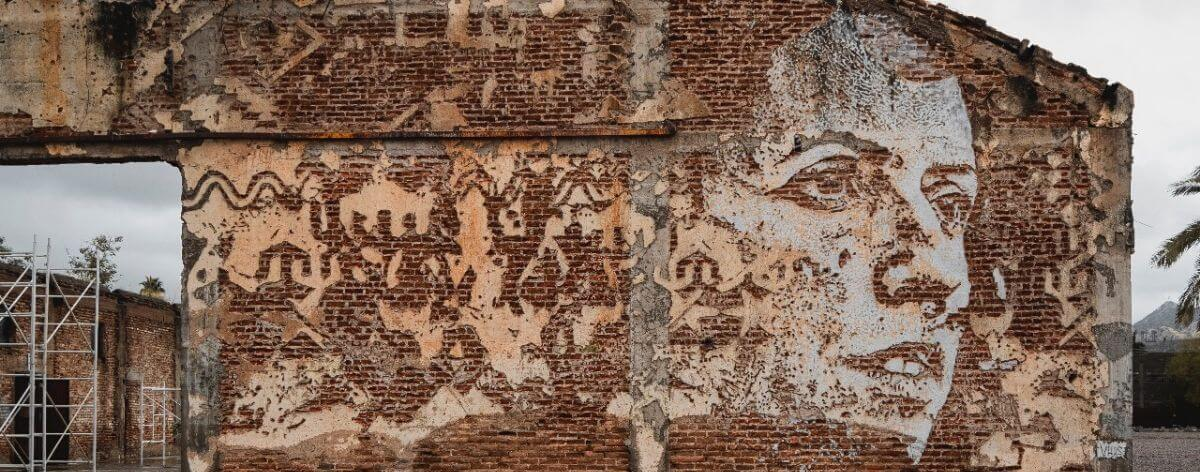
Vhils New Mural in Hermosillo, Sonora, Mexico for All City Canvas Global Series

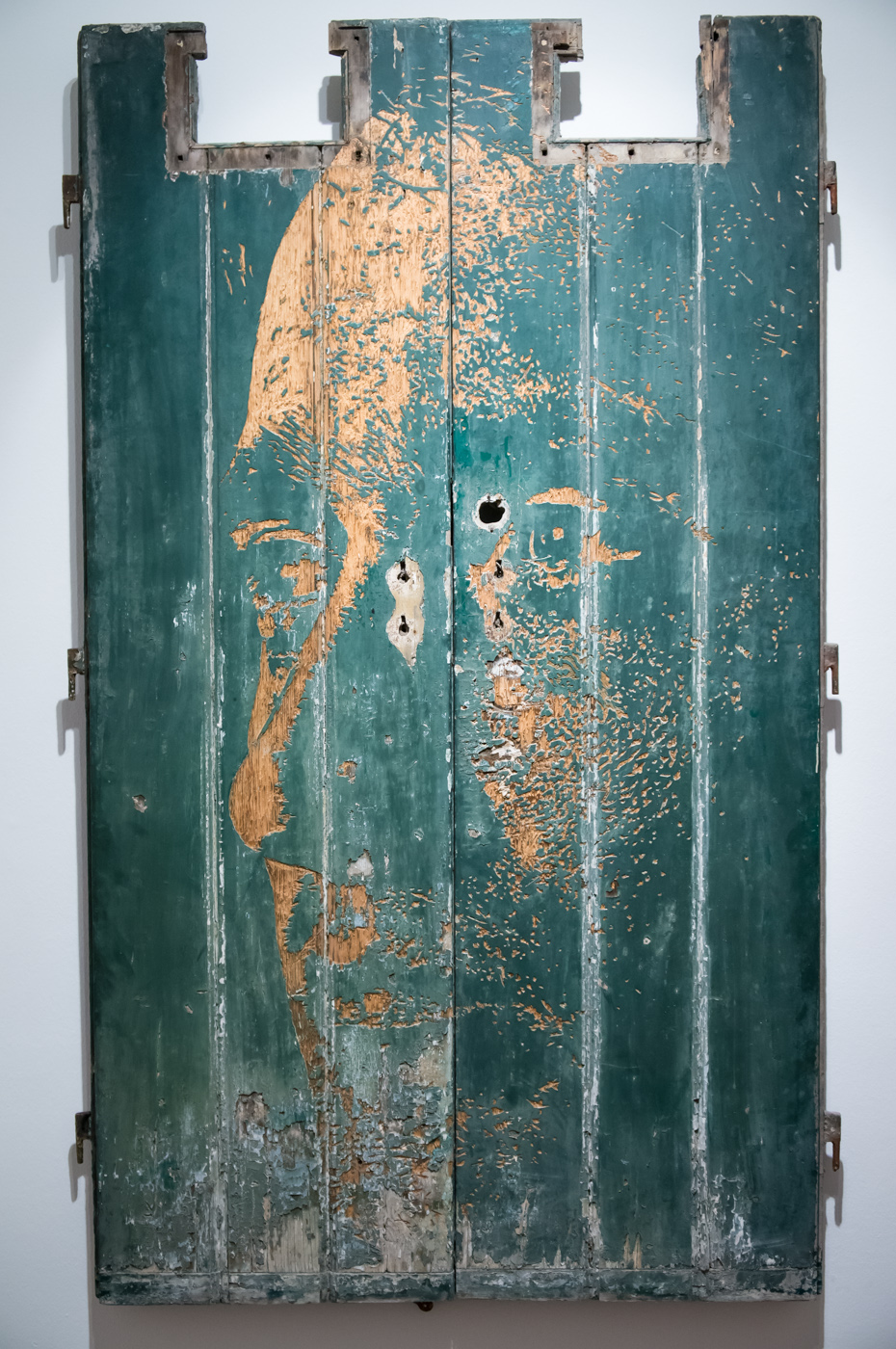
Vhils Diorama

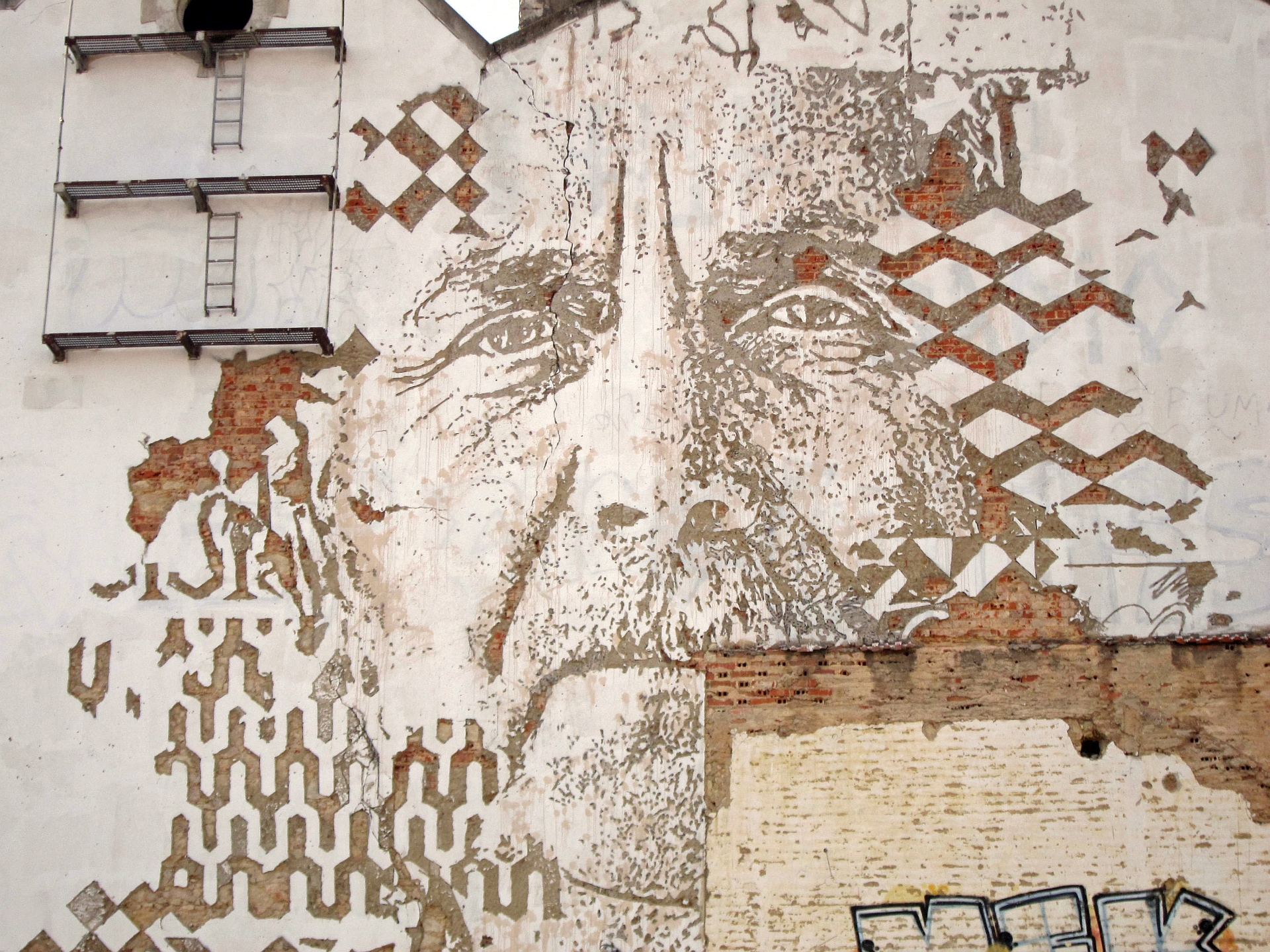
Vhils Sified Wall

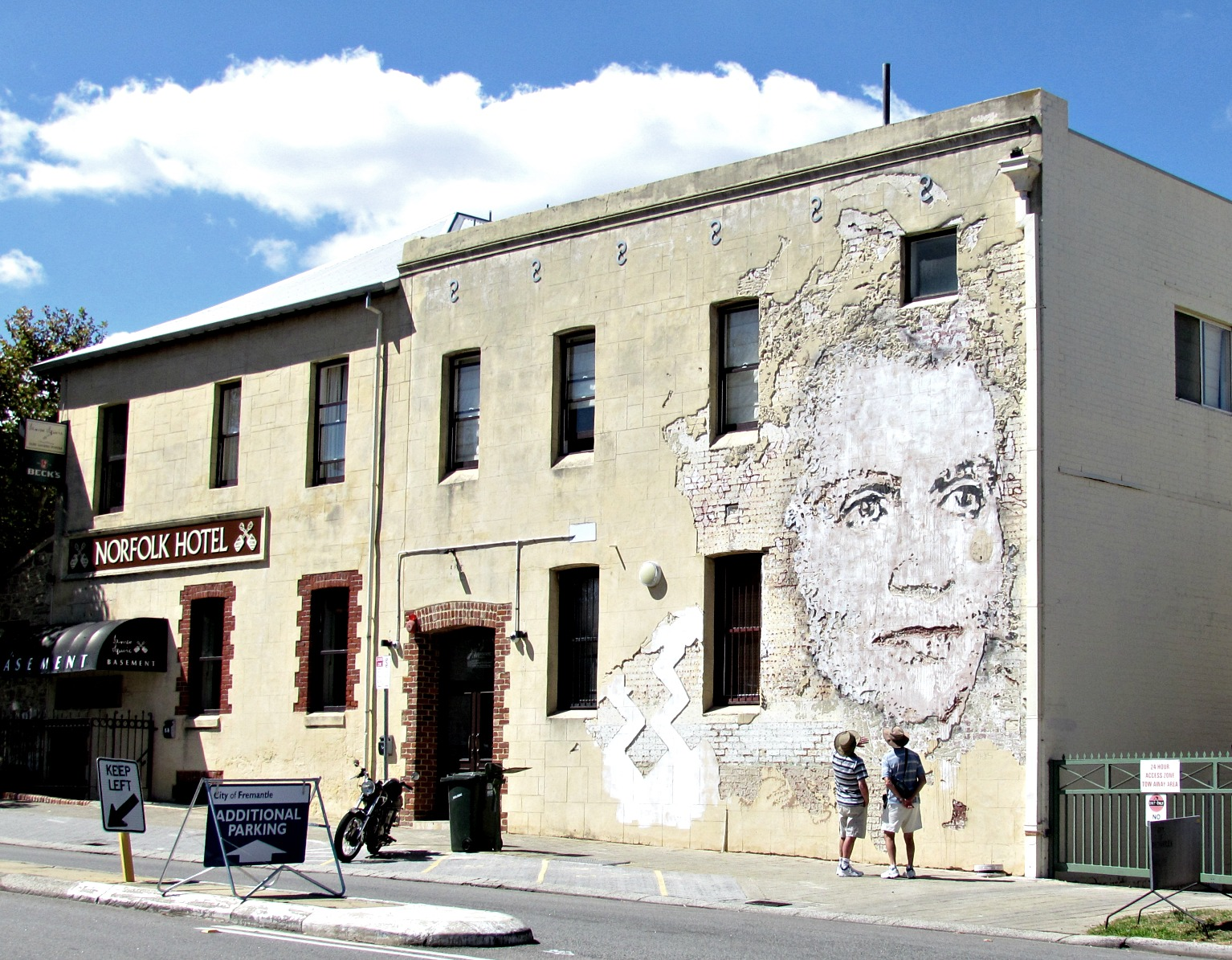
Vhils - Street art festival 2013

=== Solo shows ===
- 2026, Interval - Magda Danysz Gallery, Paris
- 2025, Selected Editions. 2008-2024 - Museu do Design e da Moda, Lisbon
- 2025, Graphium - Ulsan Art Museum, Ulsan
- 2021, Latency - Danysz Gallery, Shanghai
- 2021, Trace - Fluctuart, Paris
- 2021, Portal - MAGMA Gallery, Bologna
- 2021, Fenestra - Galeria Vera Cortês, Lisbon
- 2020, Haze - Contemporary Arts Center, Cincinnati
- 2020, Momentum - Danysz gallery, Paris
- 2019, Realm - Galerie Danysz, Shanghai
- 2019, Panorama - Arsham/Fieg Gallery, New York
- 2019, Incisão - CAIXA Cultural Brasília, Brasilia
- 2018, Fragments Urbains - Le Centquatre, Paris
- 2017, Vhils X CAFA Museum - Pékin, Beijing
- 2015, Dissonance, Lazarides, London
- 2014, Vestiges, Magda Danysz Gallery, Paris
- 2012, Entropy, Magda Danysz Gallery, Paris
- 2012, Vera Cortes, Lisbon
- 2012, Visceral, Magda Danysz Gallery, Shanghai
- 2009, Scratching the surface, Lazarides, London
- 2008, Even if you win the rat race

== Honours ==
- Knight of the Order of Saint James of the Sword (9 June 2015)

== Sources ==
- Alexandre Farto aka Vhils - Dissonance
- Vhils Biography
- Vhils in Under A Red Sky at StolenSpace, LDN, 17th Jul - 17th Aug
- Vhils, aka Alexandre Farto, hits Le MUR in Oberkampf
