= Magda Danysz Gallery =

Magda Danysz Gallery is an art gallery in Paris, France, owned by Magda Danysz, an art dealer and art curator.

== Magda Danysz ==
Magda Danysz started in the art business in the early 1990s, when she opened her first art space in 1991 when she was 17. She studied at the ESSEC French business school. After graduating in 1998, she opened her gallery in July of that same year in a brand new space. She curated projects in her gallery with artists from various disciplines, from street art to digital art.

She brought Shepard Fairey to the French scene in the early 2000s (who did Barack Obama's official portrait for the presidential campaign), worked with such as JonOne since 1992, and also exhibited and promoted artists as Seen, Miss Van, Erwin Olaf, JR, Prune Nourry, Vhils and Ultralab. She participated in many art fairs around the world including Paris, Bologna, Brussels, New York, and Miami. In June 2009 she was appointed to direct the building's Bund 18 gallery in Shanghai, China, which then became the MD Gallery. She published an extensive anthology of street art. In 2015 she expanded her gallery business in London with her pop-up space, The London Project.

Since 2001 Danysz has taught cultural policies and economics at Sciences Po in Paris. She was a founder of the Paris-based contemporary art fair known as ShowOff, which has been held every year at the same time as the Foire internationale d'art contemporain (Fiac) since 2006.

== Shows (selected) ==
- Invader – 17 May – 21 June 2003
- Mambo – 31 January – 28 February 2004
- Dalek – 15 May – 12 June 2004
- Miss Van – 19 June – 24 July 2004
- Wonderland – 16 April – 28 May 2005, with Marion Peck, Mark Ryden, Eric White, Clayton Brothers
- Dalek & Shepard Fairey – 4 June – 30 July 2005
- Miss Van – 29 April – 27 May 2006
- Shepard Fairey (Obey) – 3 June – 29 July 2006
- Dalek – 21 October – 25 November 2006
- Mike Giant – Solo Show; 28 April – 26 May 2007
- Prune Nourry - Terracotta Daughters - 22 March - 10 May 2014
- JR : Close Up – Solo Show - 17 May - 5 July 2014
- Futura: Introspective – Solo Show - 14 June - 26 July 2014
- Vhils – Vestiges – Solo Show - 11 October - 15 November 2014
- Contemporary Chinese photography - 29 November - 23 December 2014
- Shepard Fairey et Denis Morris : SID Superman is Dead 4 July - 1 August 2015
- JonOne - Staring at the Stars Solo Show - 10 July - 30 August 2015
- Marion Peck – Solo Show - 15 March - 30 April 2016
- Charles Petillon – Solo Show - 14 May - 2 July 2016
- Prune Nourry -Imbalance – Solo Show; 15 October - 27 November 2016
- FAILE – Solo Show - 5 Nov - 31 December 2016

== Awards and recognition ==
- ESSEC Alumni (since 1998)
- Member of the French National Art Galleries Committee (since 2002)
- Friends of the Palais de Tokyo (since 2005)
- Chevalier des Arts et des Lettres (promotion 14 July 2006)
- French-American Foundation (Young Leader) (since 2009)
- France China Foundation : Young Leader (since 2014)
- Compagnie National des Experts (CNE), appointed expert in Chinese contemporary art and street art (since 2010)
