= Keffer =

Keffer is a surname. Notable people with the surname include:

- Bill Keffer (born 1958), American attorney and politician
- Frank Keffer (1861–?), baseball player
- Jim Keffer (born 1953), American businessman and politician

== Fictional ==
- Warren Keffer, Bablyon 5 character
