= Chris Vrenna =

American musician and producer

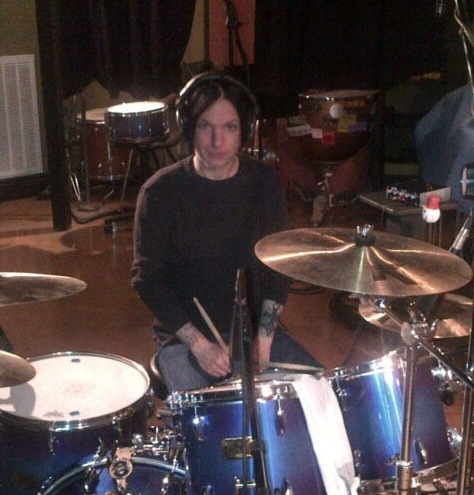
- Vrenna in 2013

Background information
- Also known as: podBoy
- Born: Christopher Vrenna; February 23, 1967 (age 59); Erie, Pennsylvania, U.S.
- Origin: Chicago, Illinois, U.S.
- Genres: Industrial rock; industrial metal; alternative rock; electronica
- Occupations: Musician; music producer
- Instruments: Drums; keyboards
- Years active: 1988–present
- Member of: Tweaker
- Formerly of: Marilyn Manson; Nine Inch Nails; Stabbing Westward; Exotic Birds
- Website: chrisvrenna.rocks

Chris Vrenna (born February 23, 1967) is an American musician, producer, engineer, remixer, programmer, and founder of the electronic band Tweaker. Vrenna played drums for the industrial rock band Nine Inch Nails from 1988 until 1996, and was the keyboardist and drummer of the American rock band Marilyn Manson from 2004 until late 2011.

As a member of Nine Inch Nails, Vrenna was inducted into the Rock & Roll Hall of Fame in 2020.

== Early life and education ==
Vrenna was born on February 23, 1967, in Erie, Pennsylvania. In 1985, he graduated from McDowell High School in Erie, where he was a member of the Erie Thunderbirds Drum and Bugle Corps.

Vrenna subsequently enrolled at Kent State University.

== Career ==
As a student at Kent State, Vrenna was recruited by Trent Reznor to join the Exotic Birds, a local Cleveland-based band, as its drummer. Vrenna initially met Reznor, who is from New Castle, Pennsylvania, during high school. In 1988, he joined Nine Inch Nails as its drummer.

In 1992, he toured as a live drummer for KMFDM during their Money era tours. After being let go from Nine Inch Nails in 1996, Vrenna moved to Chicago, where he became part of the Chicago industrial music scene and was briefly a member of Die Warzau and Stabbing Westward.

He records under the name Tweaker, and has released four albums under that name: The Attraction to All Things Uncertain (2001), 2 a.m. Wakeup Call (2004), Call The Time Eternity (2012), and And Then There's Nothing (2013). Tweaker toured select North American dates with Skinny Puppy in 2004.

As producer, remixer, or engineer Vrenna has worked with The Smashing Pumpkins, U2, Nine Inch Nails, Skinny Puppy, Humanzi, Gary Numan, Scar the Martyr, David Sylvian, Mudvayne, Lords of Acid, God Lives Underwater, Megadeth, Rammstein, Metallica, The Rasmus, Weezer, P.O.D., David Bowie, Slipknot, Cold, underwater, Scarling., Hole, Marilyn Manson, Rob Zombie, Green Day, Bush, Live, Adema, the Wallflowers, Dir En Grey, Psyclon Nine, and others. He has also worked with the industrial group Pigface and produced songs and albums for underground girl groups TCR, Jack Off Jill, and Rasputina.

Vrenna has also worked on music for several video games, including Call of Duty: Advanced Warfare, Doom 3 (as producer with Clint Walsh), Quake 4, American McGee's Alice, its sequel Alice: Madness Returns, Enter the Matrix, Sonic The Hedgehog, Area 51, and Need for Speed: Most Wanted. In 2004, he started soundtrack work on Tabula Rasa, a massive multiplayer online game. He also helped compose the theme song to the animated series Xiaolin Showdown.

He can be seen performing in the music videos for the songs "Down in It", "Head Like a Hole", "Gave Up", "Wish", "The Perfect Drug" and "March of the Pigs" on the Nine Inch Nails video compilation Closure. Vrenna won a Grammy award as a member of Nine Inch Nails for "Best Metal Performance" for "Happiness in Slavery" in 1995 for the live performance of the song on Woodstock '94.

Vrenna was Billy Corgan's programmer for four months in 1997. While he was on tour with the Smashing Pumpkins, Vrenna got a call from Axl Rose, who invited Vrenna to spend time with Guns N' Roses to work on what would become Chinese Democracy. "I did for a couple weeks, but then decided I didn't want to join the band", said Vrenna. Vrenna stated in a later interview that he was in the band for several months before dropping out due to the required time commitment.

Vrenna was chosen to take over the drumming responsibilities for Marilyn Manson after Ginger Fish was injured in 2004 during the Lest We Forget tour. He then replaced Madonna Wayne Gacy as the permanent keyboardist for Marilyn Manson. Vrenna co-produced the albums The High End of Low (2009) and Born Villain (2012). In April 2011, following the departure of Marilyn Manson's drummer Ginger Fish, Chris Vrenna was announced to be his official replacement. However, in November 2011, it was announced that Vrenna had parted ways with the band in order to focus on scoring movies and video games.

In 2013, Vrenna injured his rotator cuff while preparing for a tour. This required surgery and months of rehabilitation, effectively ending his ability to tour. Vrenna changed his focus towards scoring movies, video games, and studio production work. A few chance encounters during physical rehab lead to several teaching and speaking engagements which would later transform into a teaching career.

In 2015, Vrenna composed the music on a series of downloadable content packs called Exo Zombies for Call of Duty: Advanced Warfare.

In 2017, it was announced by Vrenna's Facebook page that he would be composing music for the upcoming video game, Quake Champions, which marks his second collaboration with id Software since Doom 3.

Vrenna earned his master's degree in music technology in 2020. He's been a college instructor of music technology since 2013.

In 2020, Vrenna was inducted into the Rock & Roll Hall of Fame alongside members of Nine Inch Nails.

In May 2024 it was announced that Vrenna would join the faculty of the University of Michigan's School of Music, Theatre, and Dance as an assistant professor in the fall 2024 semester.

== Discography ==
=== Solo ===
==== Instrumental contributions ====
List of instrumental contributions for other artists, showing album title, year released, and artist name
Title	Year	Artist(s)	Instrument(s)	Song(s)
Big Electric Metal Bass Face	1991	Die Warzau	Drums	—N/a
Broken	1992	Nine Inch Nails	Drums	"Wish" "Gave Up"
The Downward Spiral	1994	Nine Inch Nails	Drums Programming	"Hurt" "Burn"
Portrait of an American Family	1994	Marilyn Manson	Percussion	"Dope Hat"
Natural Born Killers	1994	Various Artists	Drums	"Burn" by Nine Inch Nails
Smells Like Children	1995	Marilyn Manson	Programming	—N/a
Load	1996	Metallica	Programming	—N/a
Antichrist Superstar	1996	Marilyn Manson	Programming; Drums	"Kinderfeld"
Lost Highway	1997	Trent Reznor	Drums	"Driver Down" "The Perfect Drug"
Batman & Robin	1997	The Smashing Pumpkins	Programming	"The End Is the Beginning Is the End"
Songs of the Witchblade	1998	Various artists	Programming	"Saraphrenia" "Finale: Apocalypticraft / Tunnel"
How We Quit the Forest	1998	Rasputina	Drums; Programming	—N/a
SuperCoolNothing	1998	16 Volt	Drums	—N/a
Celebrity Skin	1998	Hole	Programming	—N/a
Love Thinketh No Evil	1999	Peter Himmelman	Drums	"Eyeball"
Neve	2000	Neve	Programming	—N/a
Clear Hearts Grey Flowers	2000	Jack Off Jill	Producer	—N/a
13 Ways to Bleed on Stage	2000	Cold	Programming	—N/a
The World Needs a Hero	2001	Megadeth	Percussion	"Disconnect"
Weird Revolution	2001	Butthole Surfers	Drum Programming	"Jet Fighter"
Commencement	2002	Deadsy	Programming	—N/a
Sweet Heart Dealer	2004	Scarling	Producer	—N/a
Modern Folk and Blues: Wednesday	2006	Bob Forrest	Drums	—N/a
Bat Out of Hell III: The Monster Is Loose	2006	Meat Loaf	Programming	"Bat Out of Hell III: The Monster Is Loose"
The High End of Low	2009	Marilyn Manson	Programming	—N/a
Evanescence	2011	Evanescence	Keyboards; Programming	—N/a
Born Villain	2012	Marilyn Manson	Drums; Programming; Keyboards	—N/a
Scar the Martyr	2013	Scar the Martyr	Programming	—N/a
Man on the Run	2014	Bush	Keyboards	—N/a
Underneath	2020	Code Orange	Programming	—N/a
The Bitter Truth	2021	Evanescence	Programming	"Far From Heaven"

==== Soundtracks ====
Year	Title	Developer	Notes
1996	Quake	id Software	Credited as member of Nine Inch Nails; Co-composed with Trent Reznor
2000	American McGee's Alice	Rogue Entertainment	—N/a
2003	Xiaolin Showdown	—N/a	Television series Composed with Clint Walsh; Theme music
2004	Doom 3	id Software	Theme music producer Also provided additional in-game sounds Theme music composed with Clint Walsh; Also credited in Doom 3 BFG Edition
2004	The Sims 2	Maxis	"Dance Down" track
2005	Area 51	Midway Studios Austin	Additional music composition by Robert King and Clint Walsh
2005	Quake 4	Raven Software	Theme music producer Composed with Clint Walsh
2005	Need for Speed: Most Wanted	EA Black Box	Composed with Paul Linford on two tracks
2007	Tabula Rasa	Destination Games	Composed with Clint Walsh, Curse Mackey and Tracy W. Bush
2011	Alice: Madness Returns	Spicy Horse	"Wastelands" track
2015	Call of Duty: Advanced Warfare	Sledgehammer Games; Raven Software (Exo Zombies)	Exo Zombies game mode available in Havoc DLC pack
2022	Quake Champions	id Software	With Andrew Hulshult

==== Remixes ====
Song	Artist	Album	Label	Year
"Assimilate (Tweaker Mix – Chris Vrenna Remix)"	Skinny Puppy	Remix Dystemper	Nettwerk	1998
"From Your Mouth (Chris Vrenna Remix)"	God Lives Underwater	Rearrange EP	1500 Records	1998
"Elevation (Tomb Raider Remix)"	U2	Elevation	Island Records; Interscope Records	2001
"Freaking Out (Chris Vrenna Remix)"	Adema	Insomniac's Dream	Arista Records	2002
"Will You (Chris Vrenna Remix)"	P.O.D.	Will You	Atlantic Records	2003
"Lights Out (Chris Vrenna Remix)"	P.O.D.	Goodbye For Now	Atlantic Records	2005
"Rosenrot (The Tweaker Remix by Chris Vrenna)"	Rammstein	Rosenrot single	Universal	2005
"Blood On My Hands (Chris Vrenna Remix)"	theSTART	Blood On My Hands (Digital Only Single)	Metropolis Records	2007
"Late Night Shopping (Chris Vrenna Remix)"	David Sylvian	Waxploitation Presents: Causes 1	Waxploitation Records	2007
"If Only (Chris Vrenna Remix)"	Dethcentrik	Electronic Saviors Volume 3: Remission	Metropolis Records	2014
"No Funeral (Remixed by Tweaker)"	Nachtmystium	Retox: Remixes and Rarities	Earache Records	2017
"In An Endless Dream (Chris Vrenna Remix)"	Pure Obsessions & Red Nights (PORN)	Mr Strangler's Last Words	Les Disques Rubicon	2020
"A New Atonement (Chris Vrenna Remix)"	A Cloud of Ravens	Another Kind of Midnight (The Remixes)	Cleopatra Records	2021
"The Grind" (Chris Vrenna's Grind Version)	SPANKTHENUN	The Grind (Extended Single)	words of mass disruption media	2024

=== With Tweaker ===
- The Attraction to All Things Uncertain (2001)
- 2 a.m. Wakeup Call (2004)
- Call the Time Eternity (2012)
