= Bad Day L.A. =

2006 video game

American McGee presents: Bad Day L.A.
- Developer: The Mauretania Import Export Company/Enlight Software
- Publishers: NA: Aspyr Media; EU: Enlight Software
- Director: American McGee
- Producers: Patrick Chu; Jim Hudson
- Designer: American McGee
- Programmer: Patrick Chu
- Artists: Kozyndan; Ken Wong
- Composer: The Lodge
- Platform: Microsoft Windows
- Release: NA: September 6, 2006; AU: October 27, 2006; EU: November 24, 2006
- Genres: Action-adventure, third-person shooter
- Mode: Single-player

American McGee Presents: Bad Day L.A., also known as simply Bad Day L.A., is a 2006 third-person action video game by American McGee. Players assume the role of Anthony Willams, a former Hollywood agent turned homeless man in Los Angeles. During this time LA is ravaged by both natural and man-made disasters. Anthony only wishes to save himself, though through the course of the story he becomes an unwilling savior. The game's attempted tone is one of political satire, targeting all spectra of politics.

While the game was set for world release on September 6, 2006, it first saw the light of day as part of the 9/2006 issue (released at the end of August 2006) of the Polish video game magazine CD-Action.

The game was released to mostly negative reviews, with reviewers criticizing its gameplay, visuals, voice acting, characters, offensive and crass humor, and poor attempts at satire.

== Development ==
Bad Day L.A. was first announced for the Xbox and PC by Hong Kong developer Enlight Software on April 28, 2005. Inspiration for the game came from American McGee being in traffic seeing a Sunset Boulevard billboard from the Department of Homeland Security about preparations for biochemical terrorism. Calling it "the proverbial straw that broke the camel's back", McGee decided to make a video game as a way to inject the message of having nothing to fear but fear itself. To offset the violent events happening in Bad Day L.A., the art duo Kozyndan was hired to make the art style have a humorous nature.

The Xbox version of Bad Day L.A. was planned to be distributed by the London-based Supersonic Group, but was never released. A graphic novel based on the game and other American McGee games American McGee's Alice and American McGee's Grimm was planned.

The game was shown at E3 2005. Originally planned for an early 2006 release, on August 22, 2006, Aspyr Media announced that the game had gone gold and would be released on August 28. A demo for the game was available from MTV's website.

== Reception ==
Reception

Aggregate score
Aggregator	Score
Metacritic	28/100

Review scores
Publication	Score
1Up.com	F
Edge	4/10
GameRevolution	D
GameSpot	3/10
GameSpy	1.5/5
GamesRadar+	1/5
IGN	2.7/10
PC Gamer (UK)	43%
PC Gamer (US)	20%
X-Play	1/5

The game received "unfavorable" reviews according to video game review aggregator Metacritic.

GameSpot gave it a 3 out of 10, and called it "an abject failure" and a "spectacular failure in almost every facet of its execution". IGN gave it a 2.7, saying that "it's terrible". G4's X-Play gave it their lowest rating, a 1 out of 5, and also gave it a "Golden Mullet Award" for the year of 2006. PC Gamer gave it a 20%, saying it was "so tasteless that I wanted to scrub myself with Lysol after getting up from the computer" and "being a bad Postal clone".

GameSpy "awarded" the title the "Coaster of the Year" award for 2006. GamesRadar awarded it the "collateral damage" award for the Anti-Game of the Year, claiming that it seemed to be "designed to end up on this list. If so... congratulations, guys, you did it!" But the game lost the award to Sonic the Hedgehog as that was apparently "the most disappointing" rather than "the absolute worst game of the year." Ben Croshaw of Zero Punctuation briefly described it as "fondly remembered alongside botched prostate surgery." GamesRadar ranked it as the 25th worst game ever made. Rolling Stone's Glixel also called it one of the worst games ever made.

Mikel Reparaz from GamesRadar placed it on his list of "unfunny games", noting the comedic timing being off, poorly direct visual gags, and overall horrible voice acting.
