= Clear Hearts Grey Flowers =

Studio album by Jack Off Jill
- Released: July 17, 2000
- Recorded: 1999
- Studio: The Mouse House Studio, Los Angeles
- Genre: Alternative metal; riot grrrl; punk rock; goth rock
- Length: 49:42
- Label: 404 Music; Risk
- Producer: Chris Vrenna

Jack Off Jill chronology
Covetous Creature (1998)	Clear Hearts Grey Flowers (2000)	Humid Teenage Mediocrity 1992-1996 (2006)

Professional ratings
Review scores
Source	Rating
AllMusic	3/5 stars
Kerrang!	3/5 stars
Metal Hammer	7/10
Record Collector	4/5 stars
Rock Sound	4/5 stars

Clear Hearts Grey Flowers is the second and final studio album by American rock band Jack Off Jill. It was released on July 17, 2000, through 404 Music and Risk Records. It was produced by Chris Vrenna of Nine Inch Nails/Tweaker.

Due to the closure of Risk Records in January 2000 and the breakup of the band shortly after the album's release, Clear Hearts Grey Flowers received minimal promotion. However, the album's popularity grew through the internet and word of mouth and helped cement Jack Off Jill a cult following in the years following its release. Clear Hearts Grey Flowers was issued on vinyl for the first time by Sympathy For The Record Industry in 2006.

On May 26, 2021, Poppy released a cover of "Fear of Dying". The cover mainly keeps in line with the original song, which was recorded as a single.

A limited edition vinyl single of "Strawberry Gashes" and the full album was released in July 2025 for the 25th anniversary of the album's release.

== Release ==
Clear Hearts Grey Flowers was intended for release on March 14, 2000. However, in December 1999, it became apparent that the band's label, the Los Angeles-based Risk Records (a subsidiary of Risk Music Group), was deeply in debt from investing too much money in unsuccessful alternative rock acts. After trying and failing to sell Jack Off Jill "for ludicrous amounts of money" to major record labels, Risk Records went bankrupt in January 2000, which resulted in all of the label's staff, including the band's A&R rep, being laid off. Subsequently, Jack Off Jill and Clear Hearts Grey Flowers were transferred over to 404 Music, another Risk Music Group label based in Atlanta.

On April 10, 2000, Jack Off Jill performed a showcase of the album at The Troubadour in Los Angeles, California, with Chris Vrenna filling in on drums. This performance turned out to be Jack Off Jill's final show before their breakup, with Jessicka stating that the band had no plans to tour in support of the album.

404 Music did little to promote Clear Hearts Grey Flowers, which was released on July 17, 2000. In August 2000, Jack Off Jill officially broke up, with Jessicka citing "the stress of years of bad decisions, our record company being very unstable, the deterioration of mine and my bass players partnership, and the fact that we just couldn’t and didn’t want to fake it."

== Artwork ==
The cover of Clear Hearts, Grey Flowers is a painting by Mark Ryden with the same name. The blonde woman in the album's cover art was speculated to be either:

- a representation of guitarist Helen Storer of the UK all-female band Fluffy, who joined Jack Off Jill onstage once for their farewell performance at The Troubadour in Los Angeles in April 2000. On Jack Off Jill's website it said Storer was the blonde; or
- Michelle Inhell, the band's original guitarist, who temporarily rejoined Jack Off Jill and cowrote two songs on this album.

Singer Jessicka later revealed on her website that she had sketched the concept for Mark Ryden and that the third woman was actually supposed to be a combination of both Inhell and Storer, who were both blonde at the time of the recording.

== Track listing ==
All tracks are written by Jessicka Addams and Robin Moulder, except where noted.

No.	Title	Writer(s)	Length
1.	"When I Am Queen"	Addams; Moulder; Clint Walsh	2:54
2.	"Fear of Dying"	Addams; Moulder; Walsh	2:44
3.	"Nazi Halo"		2:41
4.	"Rabbiteen"		3:17
5.	"Strawberry Gashes"	Addams; Moulder; Michelle Oliver; Walsh	3:43
6.	"Author Unknown"		2:35
7.	"Vivica"		5:07
8.	"Witch Hunt"		2:22
9.	"Cinnamon Spider"	Addams	2:49
10.	"Underjoyed"		2:53
11.	"Surgery"		4:33
12.	"Star No Star"	Addams; Moulder; Scott Putesky	4:21
13.	"Losing His Touch"	Addams; Moulder; Oliver; Walsh	2:57
14.	"Clear Hearts, Grey Flowers"		3:15
66.	"Lovesong" (The Cure cover)	Robert Smith	3:34

Note

- Tracks 15–65 are blank, 0:06 each.

== Personnel ==
Credits are adapted from the album's liner notes.

Jack Off Jill
- Jessicka – vocals
- Robin "Agent" Moulder – bass, piano
- Clinton Walsh – guitars
- Norm Block – drums

Production

- Chris Vrenna – production, engineering
- Rich Moulder – engineering
- Bill Kennedy – mixing
- James Murray – mixing assistant
- Tom Baker – mastering
Management
- Rhian Gittins – management (for Big PD Entertainment, Inc.)
- A&R – none
- Jeremy Mohr – legal representation (for Hansen, Jacobson, Teller, Hoberman, Newman, Warren, Hertz & Goldring, LLP)
- Ken Hertz – legal representation (for Hansen, Jacobson, Teller, Hoberman, Newman, Warren, Hertz & Goldring, LLP)

Artwork

- Mark Ryden – cover artwork
- Wendy Sherman – packaging design
- James Kenefick – website design
