= Covetous Creature =

EP by Jack Off Jill
- Released: November 17, 1998
- Recorded: 1998
- Genre: Alternative rock Industrial rock Electronica
- Length: 46:04
- Label: 404 Music Group

Jack Off Jill chronology
Sexless Demons and Scars (1997)	Covetous Creature (1998)	Clear Hearts Grey Flowers (2000)

Professional ratings
Review scores
Source	Rating
AllMusic	2/5 stars
Kerrang!	3/5 stars

Covetous Creature is a remix EP by Jack Off Jill released in 1998.

== Track listing ==
1. "American Made" (Tweaker Remix Chris Vrenna) – 3.25
2. "My Cat" (Meow Mix) – 5.46
3. "Poor Impulse" (No Control Mix) – 4.41
4. "Girlscout" (Sunday Mix – Susan Wallace of Switchblade Symphony with Enemies) – 3.53
5. "Cumdumpster" (Delusional Cannibal Mix Agent Moulder) – 3.07
6. "My Cat" (Automatic Speed Mix- Shai De La Luna of Lords of Acid) – 4.56
7. "Poor Impulse Control" (750 degrees of separation mix Morphic Field) – 4.27

Extra tracks (found at the end of track 7):

- "American Made" (extra metal Tweaker mix) – Starts at approx. 5.25/Ends at approx. 10.39
- "Covet" (The Clarice Starling mix) (Put The Lotion In The Basket by Jessicka & Howard Melnick) – Starts at approx. 12.30

== Personnel ==
- Jessicka
- Robin Moulder
- Claudia Rossi
- Ivan de Prume (Former White Zombie drummer)
- Scott Putesky (Former lead guitarist of Marilyn Manson and the Spooky Kids)
