= 2 a.m. Wakeup Call =

2 A.M. Wakeup Call

Studio album by Tweaker
- Released: April 20, 2004
- Genres: Alternative rock Industrial rock Electronica; Progressive rock
- Length: 46:39
- Label: Waxploitation
- Producers: Chris Vrenna, Clint Walsh

Tweaker chronology
The Attraction to All Things Uncertain (2001)	2 A.M. Wakeup Call (2004)	Call The Time Eternity (2012)

Professional ratings
Review scores
Source	Rating
Allmusic	4/5 stars

2 A.M. Wakeup Call is the second album from the band Tweaker. Opposed to The Attraction to All Things Uncertain, this album captures emotional, human performances and instrumentation - notably live drums, acoustic guitar, piano and glockenspiels. It's a nighttime record about dreams, nightmares, and insomnia—things that keep us up at night.

Vrenna has stated in interviews that the title was inspired by his wife's insomnia. For a period of about a month she would wake up at 2am every single night no matter when they went to bed.

2 a.m. Wakeup Call was subsequently released in 5.1 Surround Sound.

The track "It's Still Happening" was offered to the ACIDplanet community for remixing as a part of the Tweaker 2 Remix contest.

== Track listing ==
No.	Title	Length
1.	"Ruby" (featuring Will Oldham)	3:43
2.	"Cauterized"	3:06
3.	"Worse Than Yesterday" (featuring Jonathan Bates of mellowdrone)	4:18
4.	"Truth Is" (featuring Robert Smith of The Cure)	4:03
5.	"Remorseless"	2:37
6.	"Pure Genius" (featuring David Sylvian)	3:52
7.	"It's Still Happening" (featuring Hamilton Leithauser)	3:17
8.	"2 a.m."	3:15
9.	"Movement of Fear"	3:40
10.	"Sleepwalking Away" (featuring Nick Young)	3:57
11.	"The House I Grew Up In"	4:04
12.	"Crude Sunlight" (featuring Jennifer Charles)	6:52

== Personnel ==
- Chris Vrenna - producer, recording engineer, mixing engineer
- Clint Walsh - producer
- Jeff Antebi - executive producer
- Johnny Marr - guitar on track 11
- Paul Ill - bass on track 3; fretless bass on track 12
- Rich Mouser - recorded additional live drums on tracks 1 and 10
- Ken Lee - mastering engineer
