= Akaneiro: Demon Hunters =

2013 video game

- Developer: Spicy Horse
- Platform: Browser
- Release: 31 January 2013
- Genre: Action role-playing
- Mode: Single-player

Akaneiro: Demon Hunters is a dark fantasy, free-to-play video game that was developed by American McGee's company Spicy Horse. It was originally announced for release in 2012. Whereas McGee's earlier games, American McGee's Alice and Alice: Madness Returns, draw heavily from Lewis Carroll's Alice in Wonderland, Akaneiro: Demon Hunters adapts the Little Red Riding Hood fairytale, throwing her into the setting of feudal Japan. It was successfully crowd-funded through Kickstarter and was released as browser game.

== Development ==
American McGee was initially inspired by the book The Lost Wolves of Japan, which depicted the destruction of wolves in Japan at the hands of foreign farmers. The idea was to combine the Red Riding Hood character with the setting of nature's destruction by humans. On top of that, the demons were added to enhance the whole story.

== Reception ==
Reception

Aggregate score
Aggregator	Score
Metacritic	53/100

Review scores
Publication	Score
GameSpot	5/10
IGN	4.5/10
Jeuxvideo.com	13/20

On its release, Akaneiro: Demon Hunters was met with "mixed or average" reviews from critics, with an aggregate score of 53/100 on Metacritic.
