= Humid Teenage Mediocrity 1992–1996 =

Humid Teenage Mediocrity

Compilation album by Jack Off Jill
- Released: May 9, 2006
- Recorded: 1992–1996
- Studios: Studio 13, Deerfield Beach, Florida, United States
- Genre: Punk rock • grunge • riot grrrl
- Length: 1 hour 7 minutes
- Labels: Sympathy for the Record Industry (United States); Livewire/Cargo Records (Europe)
- Producers: Jeremy Staska; Marilyn Manson; Jack Off Jill

Jack Off Jill chronology
| Clear Hearts Grey Flowers (2000) | Humid Teenage Mediocrity (2006) |

European cover
- European cover

Humid Teenage Mediocrity 1992–1996 is a compilation album by American riot grrrl band Jack Off Jill. It was released on the label Sympathy for the Record Industry in the US, and Livewire/Cargo Records in Europe.

The album consists of early singles released on singer Jessicka's Rectum Records label and demo versions of songs which later appeared on Sexless Demons and Scars, the band's full-length debut album. Marilyn Manson is credited with production of 17 tracks, and contributes sleeve notes.

== Track listing ==
1. "Hypocrite" – 3:02
2. "Horrible" – 2:29
3. "Kringle" – 2:52
4. "Lollirot" – 2:39
5. "Media C-Section" – 1:51
6. "My Cat ('94)" – 3:07
7. "Super Sadist" – 1:49
8. "Spit and Rape" – 3:25
9. "Swollen ('94)" – 3:23
10. "Yellow Brick Road" – 2:18
11. "American Made" – 3:27
12. "Boy Grinder" – 3:45
13. "Bruises are Back in Style" – 3:44
14. "Cherry Scented" – 1:23
15. "Chocolate Chicken" – 1:28
16. "Choke" – 4:00
17. "Confederate Fag" – 1:27
18. "Cumdumpster" – 2:22
19. "Don't Wake the Baby ('95)" – 1:43
20. "Everything's Brown" – 3:55
21. "French Kiss the Elderly" – 3:43
22. "Girlscout" – 3:18
23. "Working with Meat" (US version only)
24. "Cockroach Waltz" (US version only)

== Personnel ==
- Jessicka — vocals
- Agent Moulder — bass, piano
- Michelle Inhell — guitar
- Tenni Ah Cha Cha — drums
- Marilyn Manson — producer (tracks: 1–10, 12–14, 16, 18, 19, 21, 22), additional guitar track on 'Swollen', credited as "Sausage Pot Bri"
