= Teargas & Plateglass =

- Origin: Unknown
- Genres: Electronica, dark ambient, drone music
- Years active: 2001 to Present
- Labels: Waxploitation
- Members: Unknown
- Past members: Unknown
- Website: www.teargasandplateglass.com

Teargas & Plateglass are a band who produce electronica, dark ambient and drone music with accompanying videos. NME classified their music as "illbient", "ambient for sick people".

They are influenced by the works of Godfrey Reggio and Sebastião Salgado, David Sylvian, Jennifer Charles, Tweaker and David Hykes.

== History ==
They started out in 2001 and initially worked on remixes for 311, Tweaker, and Natacha Atlas, before releasing the track "When We Are Ignorant" in 2003.

The American Film Institute, which exhibited their music videos in 2008, called them "a bold experimental vision". URB said the band "pave the way so the dark side can take its rightful place at the forefront of the genre". XLR8R described their sound as "darkness mixed thick like a pool of blood" and advised listeners to "take with a stiff glass of Absinthe". Danger Mouse likened their music to "the end of the world". King Britt noted that "their music restores my faith that deep, dark music still moves the masses".

== Debut album ==
Logo

The band released an eponymous album in 2005, featuring Lil Gong, Oba Funke, Zap Mama and Natacha Atlas. AllMusic rated it 2.5/5, saying "this dark, desolate dirt road goes nowhere" while forecasting success in soundtracks.

In 2004 they performed unannounced eastern European shows under the names Septagon, Undecagon, Duodecagon, Enneacontagon, and Hecatommyriagon.

== Black Triage ==
Their second album Black Triage was released in 2008. Impose described it as "brutal" and compared it to Burial.

To complement the visceral music, the text inside the CD booklet was penned by the filmmaker Godfrey Reggio of Koyaanisqatsi fame.

Three music videos were produced for the album and debuted at the 2007 American Film Institute Festival, which called the band 'a bold experimental vision'.

== Notable songs ==
Two Teargas & Plateglass songs were used for trailers for the movie X-Men: The Last Stand. The song "Plague Burial" was used for the theatrical trailer, and the song "Book of Black Valentines" was used for the non-theatrical trailer. "Plague Burial" was also used in the trailer for Beowulf (2007). Several songs have been heard in CSI, CSI New York and CSI Miami. The song "A Uniquely Hostile Place" was used in the Steven Spielberg produced television show United States of Tara.

== Discography ==
- Teargas & Plateglass (album). Self-titled album released in 2004. Now out of print.
- Black Triage (album). Released 2007.
- One Day Across The Valley / Behold a Sea of Ills So Vast (10"). Released 2008.
- Plague Burial / Simplify this Landscape with Darkness (10"). Released 2008.
- A Uniquely Hostile Place (7"). Released 2011.
