= American McGee =

American video game designer (born 1972)

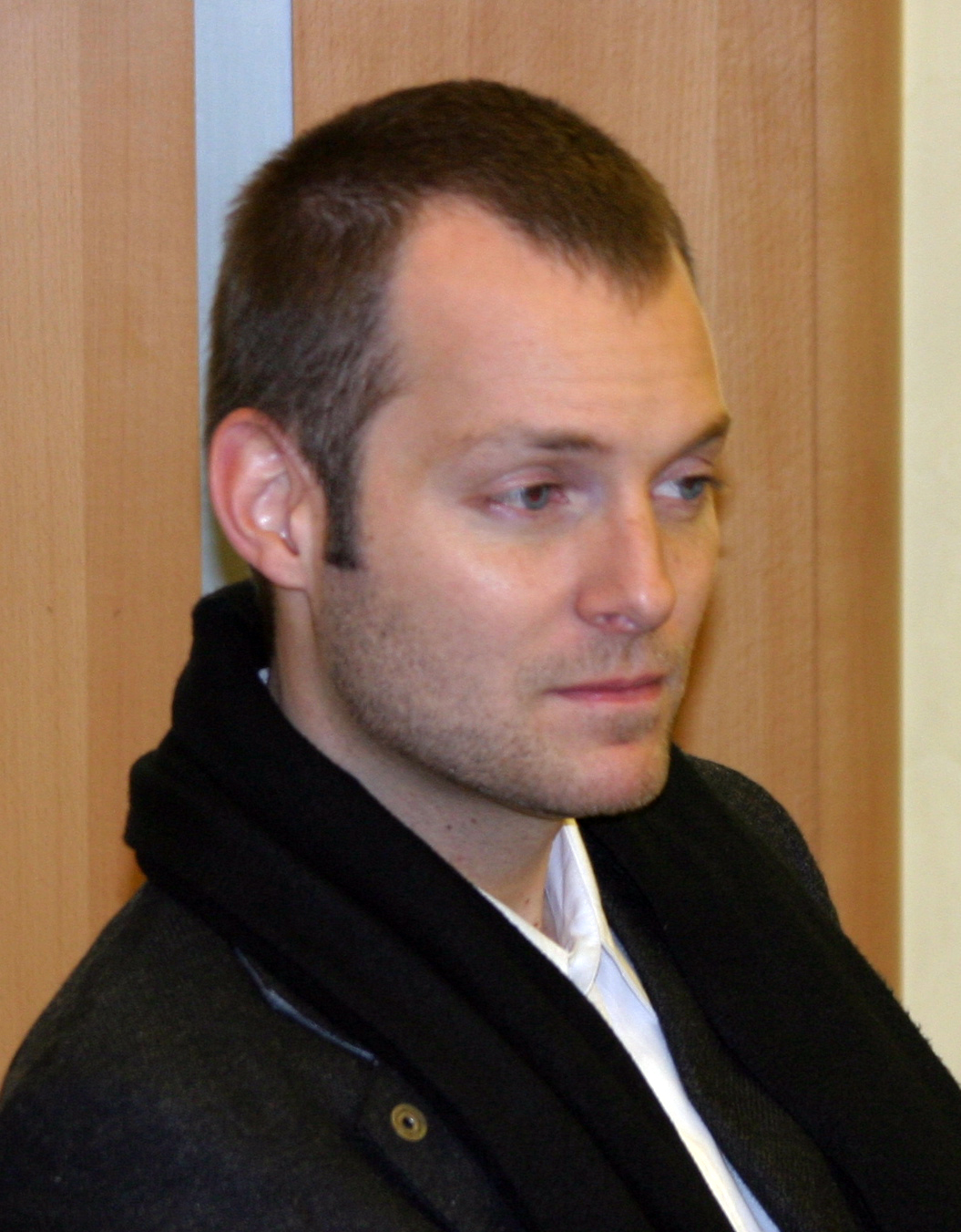
- McGee in 2004
- Born: Dallas, Texas, U.S.
- Occupation: Video game designer
- Known for: Doom II; The Ultimate Doom; Quake; Quake II; American McGee's Alice; Bad Day L.A.; Alice: Madness Returns
- Children: 2
- Website: americanmcgee.com

American James McGee is an American video game designer. He is best known as the designer of American McGee's Alice, its sequel Alice: Madness Returns, and his works on various video games from id Software.

== Early life ==
American McGee was born in Dallas, Texas, to an eccentric mother who was a house painter. His only interaction with his biological father was on his 13th birthday, a meeting which turned violent as McGee's father drunkenly assaulted him that night. McGee was highly creative and was gifted in mathematics and science, taking an early interest in computer programming. He was eventually accepted to a magnet school for computer science.

McGee had a number of stepfathers when growing up until his mother settled into a relationship with a trans woman. When McGee was sixteen, he came home from school and found his house empty and abandoned; the only things left were his bed, his books, his clothes and his Commodore 64 computer. His mother had sold the house to pay for two plane tickets and the fee for her girlfriend's gender-affirming surgery, leaving him on his own. He packed up his computer, dropped out of high school and took a variety of odd jobs, finally settling on a Volkswagen repair shop.

== Career ==
=== id Software ===
At 21, McGee, an automobile and gaming enthusiast, moved to an apartment complex where he met and befriended John Carmack. Carmack offered McGee a tech support job at id Software, where he was quickly promoted to level designer and music manager. McGee, along with Kevin Cloud and Tim Willits, were part of id Software's "second generation" of developers, working on games such as The Ultimate Doom, Doom II, Quake and Quake II.

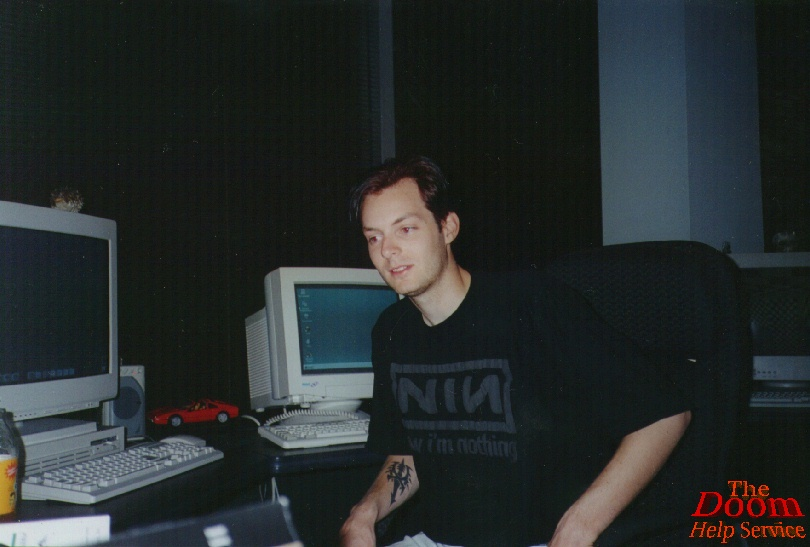
McGee at id Software (October 6, 1995)

In 1998, McGee was fired from id Software. McGee said that the day he got fired was very meaningful to him:

Probably the most meaningful day for me though [working at id Software] ... was the day I was fired. I felt a mixture of terror and freedom that was so significant and powerful—it combined together all the good and bad of the years I'd spent working with Carmack, Romero and the others... and kicked me out into the world to fend for myself. The opportunity to work at id during those early years was so unbelievable—and the path it set me on in letting me go has been even more fantastic. I'm sitting here in Shanghai, China still drawing on many of the lessons and experiences from all those years past... it's been an incredible journey which all started with id [Software].

— American McGee, "American McGee on Quake", interview with quaddicted.com (May/June 2011)

According to former id staff Sandy Petersen, Tim Willits was the one responsible for McGee's firing (although he did not mention Willits by name; referring to him only by "Snake" and "X"). Allegedly, during the development of Quake II, Willits deliberately gave bad level design advice to McGee and when he presented his work to Carmack, it angered him and McGee was fired soon after. McGee has stated to this day, he still has no idea why he was fired but acknowledged the fact that it was due to "internal politics and my own failings".

=== Electronic Arts ===
McGee joined Electronic Arts and worked as creative director on American McGee's Alice (with Rogue Entertainment), which garnered favorable reviews. Discussions began after the game's release about making a film adaptation of the game; initially Wes Craven was attached to direct the film, and actress Sarah Michelle Gellar bought the film rights, but the film has remained in development hell.

After finishing Alice, McGee left EA "in frustration" when the company fired his creative partner R. J. Berg and shut down Rogue Entertainment.

=== The Mauretania Import Export Company ===
In 2002, McGee founded the short-lived Carbon6, which two years later became known as Mauretania Import Export Company. McGee directed the 2002 music video for the song "Same Ol' Road" by the band dredg, from their album El Cielo. Partnering with Enlight Software and its founder Trevor Chan, McGee released the games Scrapland in 2004 and Bad Day L.A. in 2006.

McGee backed the Nintendo Wii as the "only truly next-gen".

=== Shanghai and Spicy Horse ===
In 2005, McGee left the United States and resided for a time in Hong Kong before moving to Shanghai, where he has lived since 2009. Once in China, he created Spicy Horse, and helped found Blade (formerly Vykarian), a game outsourcing company. They produced American McGee's Grimm for GameTap (now owned by Metaboli) and worked on the sequel to his original Alice game, Alice: Madness Returns.

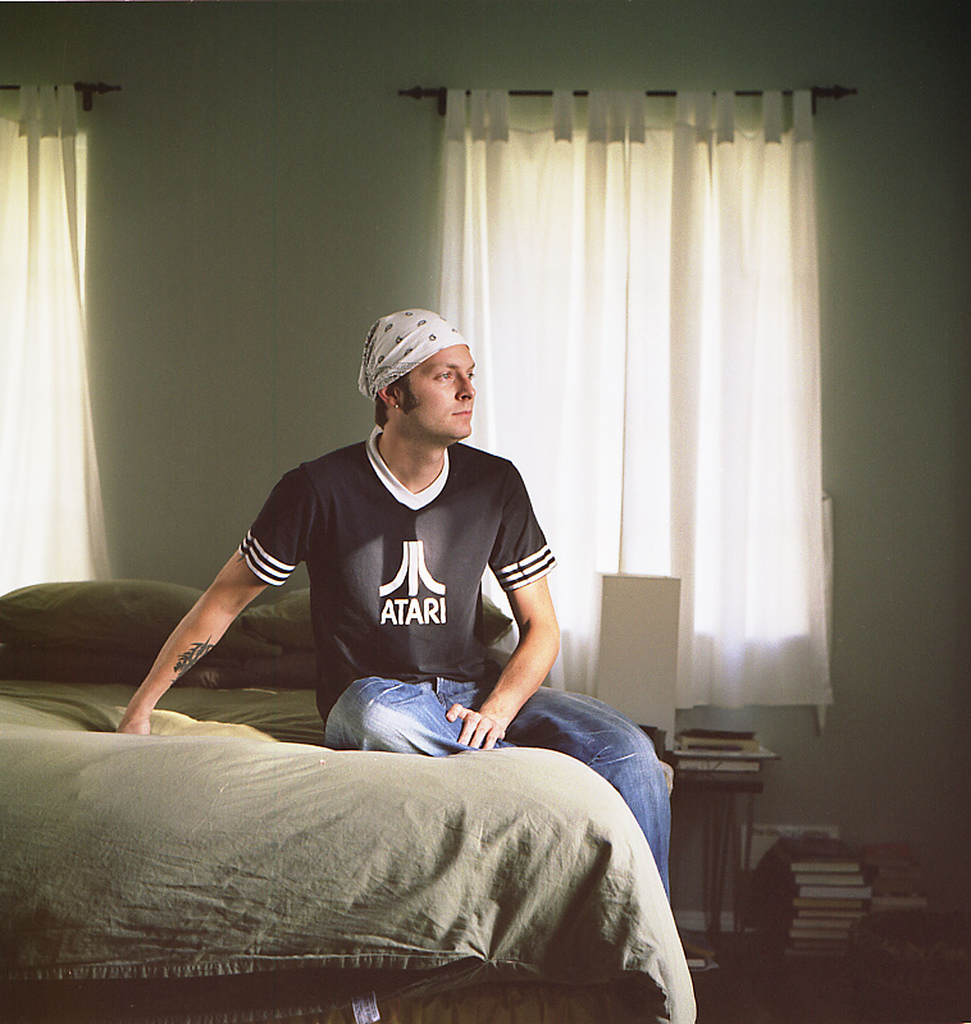
McGee in 2006

The planned American McGee's Oz, which was to be produced in conjunction with Ronin Games, was canceled over financial difficulties at Atari. American McGee's Grimm, developed by his Shanghai-based game development studio Spicy Horse for the online service GameTap, was released in 23 weekly episodic segments, starting in 2007.

At the 2009 D.I.C.E. Summit, Electronic Arts CEO John Riccitiello announced that a sequel to American McGee's Alice was in development for PC, PlayStation 3 and Xbox 360 by McGee's Spicy Horse studio. In July 2010, at the EA Showcase in San Francisco, Spicy Horse and EA announced that sequel's title, Alice: Madness Returns, released less than one year after its announcement, on June 14, 2011.

McGee's Spicy Horse expanded to include another brand, Spicy Pony, to produce digital mobile media games for the iOS platform. Their first title, DexIQ, was released in early December 2009, and its follow-up, Crooked House, was released in March 2010 (both had iPad versions released in June 2010). On December 17, 2010, McGee's old company The Mauretania Import Export Company was dissolved and all intellectual property was transferred to Spicy Horse.

In 2012, McGee developed free-to-play games for mobile devices, such as BigHead Bash, Akaneiro, and Crazy Fairies. In 2013, he opened a Kickstarter for a new game, American McGee's OZombie; however, due to slow and lackluster funding, the project was canceled. Another Kickstarter for a project called Alice: Otherlands, a planned series of short films leading to a theatrical film, was announced a few days later. This reached its goal on August 4, 2013, and was officially confirmed.

=== Alice: Asylum, cancellation and retirement ===
In September 2017, McGee announced that he was working on a license proposal for Alice: Asylum, the third installment of the Alice franchise. McGee and his small team began working on a pitch book of "artwork, design outline, and financial/business model" which would be sent to EA upon completion. The pitch book was partially funded through the membership platform Patreon, and presented to EA in early 2023.

McGee announced in April 2023 that EA ultimately rejected approving Alice: Asylum for both production and licensing after receiving McGee's pitch. Furthermore, McGee announced that even if EA were to reconsider their stance with production of the game in the future, he was not interested in being involved in future Alice projects.

He also announced his retirement from game development, with plans to focus on his family and their family business, Mysterious.

=== Plushie Dreadfuls ===
In 2015, McGee and Yeni Zhang, his wife, founded the plush toy line 'Plushie Dreadfuls' under their company, Mysterious, Inc. Plushie Dreadfuls currently features plush toys designed around Alice In Wonderland characters, mental health conditions, marginalized sexualities, chronic health issues, and disabilities.

McGee has stated that he was inspired to start the plush toy line after offering a version of the white rabbit plush belonging to 'Alice' from the game franchise to supporters, and his own personal life experiences with abuse, trauma, and witnessing bigotry.

=== Dreadfuland ===
In 2026, McGee announced plans for a 'spiritual successor' to the Alice games in the form of Dreadfuland - a game based on the story of the Plushie Dreadfuls, but not related directly to the Alice franchise or IP. Development is currently underway, and the story so far has revealed to focus on a boy's adventures through the land of the Plushie Dreadful rabbits.

== Personal life ==
McGee lives in Shanghai with his wife, Yeni Zhang. The couple co-founded Mysterious, Inc., a company that markets art, apparel, and accessories based on McGee's works, with Zhang overseeing the designs. The couple has two children. McGee identifies as pansexual.

McGee had a sister, Mercy Covington, who was reported missing on November 10, 2015. As of November 2025, her case remains unsolved.

== Games ==
Year	Title (Note: All titles sourced from MobyGames)	Role	Developer
1992	Wolfenstein 3D	Software support	Id Software
1993	Doom	Design, level design and technical support. Simplified the level design and textures for the Atari Jaguar/32X version(s) in 1994	Id Software
1994	Doom II	Design and technical support	Id Software
1995	The Ultimate Doom	Testing, technical support and special thanks	Id Software
1995	Hexen: Beyond Heretic	Design	Raven Software
1996	Final Doom	Design, level design and technical support	Id Software
1996	Quake	Level design	Id Software
1997	Doom 64	Design	Midway Games
1997	Quake Mission Pack 1: Scourge of Armagon	Design	Id Software
1997	Quake Mission Pack 2: Dissolution of Eternity	Design	Id Software
1997	Quake II	Level design	Id Software
1998	Dominion: Storm Over Gift 3	Sound design	Ion Storm/7th Level
2000	American McGee's Alice	Original concept, director, cinematic script design	Rogue Entertainment
2004	American McGee Presents: Scrapland	Executive producer	MercurySteam
2004	GoldenEye: Rogue Agent	Multiplayer director	Electronic Arts
2006	American McGee Presents: Bad Day L.A.	Creative director	Enlight Software/TMIEC
2008	American McGee's Grimm	Creative director	Spicy Horse
2011	Alice: Madness Returns	Original concept, director, writer	Spicy Horse
2026<	Plushie Dreadfuls: The Videogame	Original concept, director, writer	
Cancelled	Alice: Asylum		
Cancelled	Oz: Adventures		
