= Jack Off Jill =

American rock band

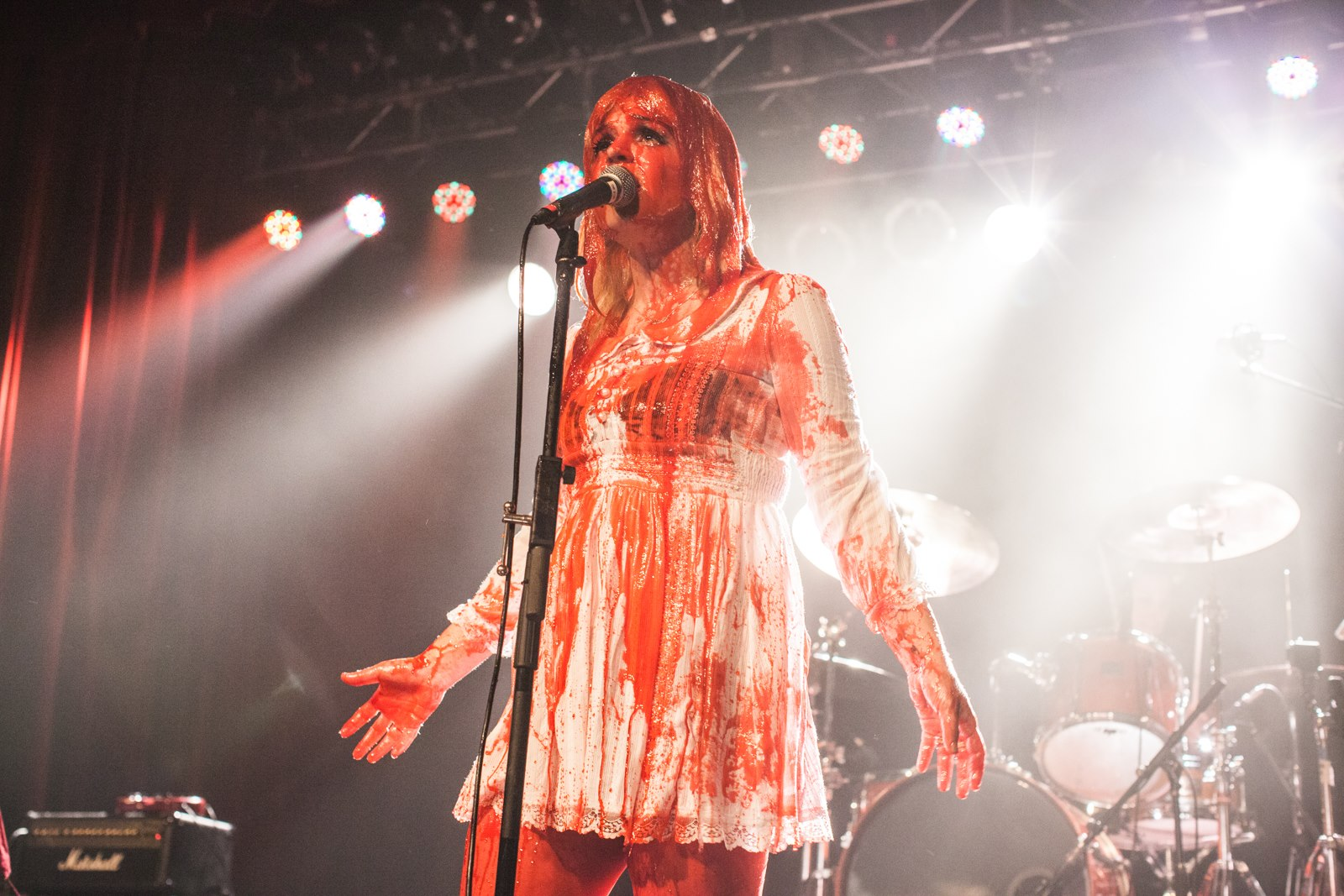
- Jessicka performing with Jack Off Jill at the Orange Peel in 2015

Background information
- Origin: Fort Lauderdale, Florida U.S.
- Genres: Alternative rock; riot grrrl; gothic rock; gothic metal
- Years active: 1992–2000; 2015
- Labels: Rectum Records; Risk; Sympathy for the Record Industry
- Past members: See list of members
- Website: jessicka.com

Jack Off Jill was an American alternative rock band from Fort Lauderdale, Florida, formed in 1992 by vocalist Jessicka, drummer Tenni Ah-Cha-Cha, bassist/keyboardist Agent Moulder, and guitarist Michelle Inhell. Though these four women were the initial founders, nine members rotated through the group in its life-span, including Scott Putesky, guitarist and co-founder of Marilyn Manson. The band lasted nine years, with only Jessicka and Moulder remaining throughout the initial run. The band reunited in 2015 for a number of shows, with Jessicka, Tenni, Inhell, and bassist Helen Storer.

== History ==
Tenni Arslanyan met Jessicka while attending Piper High School in Sunrise, Florida. They began writing songs, and were joined by Moulder and Inhell to create the band that would become Jack Off Jill.

Jack Off Jill's first show was at a club called Ironworks in Ft. Lauderdale, Florida. Their second show was opening for Marilyn Manson and his shock-rock outfit, Marilyn Manson and the Spooky Kids, at a Davie, Florida night club called The Plus Five Lounge. Manson went on to produce their early demos and had them open most of his shows.

During this time, the band served as the opening act for many female-fronted national acts such as: Joan Jett, L7, Silverfish, Tribe 8, Fetchin' Bones, and the Lunachicks. Jessicka's on-stage antics included covering the audience with fake blood and throwing candy. In early 1993, Jessicka performed with Manson's ephemeral side project, Mrs. Scabtree.

They took inspiration from the riot grrrl movement, with songs addressing serious issues such as rape, domestic abuse, self harm, depression, patriarchy, and female empowerment. In 1993, Jack Off Jill's front woman Jessicka coined the term "riot goth" to describe their music and aesthetic.

On December 27, 1994, Jack Off Jill joined Marilyn Manson at venues throughout Florida. While playing Club 5 in Jacksonville, Florida, Manson and Jessicka were arrested for violating the town's adult entertainment codes. Neither singer was charged.

Jack Off Jill released several independent records: Children 5 and Up (produced by Marilyn Manson), The Boygrinder Sessions, Cannibal Song Book (produced by Jeremy Staska, JOJ and Manson), Cockroach Waltz, and several 7" singles. On April 8, 1994, while playing a benefit show for Rock Against Domestic Violence with Babes in Toyland and 7 Year Bitch at the Cameo Theatre on Miami Beach, the band caught the eye of record labels. Los Angeles-based Risk Records later signed them in January 1997. The band replaced both Ah Cha Cha and Inhell with new members because the two were not ready to leave Florida. They released their first national 7" record, "Girl Scout"/"American Made", in March 1997. On September 9, 1997, their first full-length album, Sexless Demons and Scars (produced by Gumball's leader Don Fleming, who co-produced Hole's Pretty on the Inside), was released.

After touring with Lords of Acid, Jack Off Jill headed to Los Angeles to complete 1998's Covetouse Creature, a remix EP of songs from Sexless Demons and Scars, with the help of Scott Putesky (a founding member of Marilyn Manson) and new drummer Claudia Rossi. Jack Off Jill hit the road on a national tour with Psychotica, joined along the way by Switchblade Symphony.

The band road-tested new songs in March 1999 when JOJ played four dates on the Marilyn Manson Rock Is Dead Tour, after Hole departed. With Putesky no longer in the guitar position, JOJ enlisted the help of Jessicka's then-boyfriend guitarist Clint Walsh, original JOJ guitarist Michelle Inhell (née Oliver), and drummer Norm Block (formerly of Plexi) for the tour. On July 17, 2000, JOJ released their second full-length CD, Clear Hearts Grey Flowers on Risk Records, that featured a cover by artist Mark Ryden and was produced by Chris Vrenna of Tweaker and Nine Inch Nails.

Jack Off Jill played its last show at The Troubadour in Los Angeles in April 2000. They were joined onstage by guitarist Helen Storer of the UK all-female band Fluffy (and later of Thee Heavenly Music Association) and producer Chris Vrenna on drums.

== Breakup and aftermath ==
Jack Off Jill officially disbanded in the year 2000. Jessicka founded noise-pop band Scarling. in 2001. Moulder began her studio project TCR. Tenni Ah-Cha-Cha and Michelle Inhell's (née Oliver) founded Set to Zero. In 2010 Tenni Ah-Cha-Cha began playing with Zombie Queen out of Asheville, NC. Claudia Rossi founded a group called One Of The Loudest Tragedies Ever Heard. Putesky worked on his solo project, Three Ton Gate.

Post-breakup, critics touted JOJ as "riot-goth legends" and referred to Jack Off Jill's final album as "excellent, yet under-appreciated".

Former band member Jeff Tucci (Ho Ho Spade) died on November 27, 2014, of a drug overdose.

In September 2013, founding member of Marilyn Manson and Jack Off Jill guitarist Putesky was diagnosed with stage-four colon cancer. He died on October 22, 2017.

On May 26, 2021, Poppy released a cover of Jack Off Jill's song "Fear of Dying". The cover mainly keeps in line with the original song which was recorded as a single for their final album, Clear Hearts Grey Flowers.

== Reunion ==
A reunion had been discussed by the band members in the preceding years, but they did not have the time to organise one. When Jessicka Addams suffered a serious health emergency in 2013, she decided it was "now or never".

On April 7, 2015, Bust.com announced a Jack Off Jill reunion show at The Orange Peel in Asheville, NC on July 18 as well as a Pledgemusic campaign offering "Golden Tickets" and other Jack Off Jill rarities related to the show. Other reunion shows in the tour included Manchester (October 19), London's Electric Ballroom (October 21) and Heaven Nightclub (October 23), where they were joined on stage by Scott Putesky, a founding member of Marilyn Manson. Their last London show was also on Jessicka's birthday, and was an emotional show for all of the fans and the band, especially due to both Jessicka's and Scott's health problems. They announced via their facebook page that these shows would be their last saying, "It's been an honor & a pleasure friends."

The 2015 roster consisted of Jessicka, Tenni Ah-Cha-Cha, Michelle Inhell (née Oliver), and Helen Storer. Original bassist Robin Moulder was not involved in the reunion shows.

Jack Off Jill is referred to by several publications as "Riot Goth Legends" and "Cult Heroes"

Singer Jessicka Addams stated that their show at Heaven in London on October 23, 2015 (her birthday) would be Jack Off Jill's final show.

== Musical style and legacy ==
The band's music was characterized by "a venom-laced lipstick smear of riot grrrl angst, industrial bite and goth-glam theatrics", according to Sydney Taylor of Loudwire. She wrote in 2025: "Fronted by the irreverent and unapologetic Jessicka Addams, the band wasn't just ahead of their time; they were kicking and screaming at it the whole way through."

== Members ==
=== Reunion lineup ===
- Jessicka (Jessicka Addams) – vocals, lyrics (1992–2000, 2015)
- Michelle Inhell (Michelle Oliver) – guitars (1992–1996, 2015)
- Helen Storer – guitars (2000), bass (2015)
- Tenni Ah-Cha-Cha (Tenni Arslanyan) – drums (1992–1996, 2015)

=== Former members ===
- Agent Moulder (Robin Moulder) – bass, piano, keyboards on "My Cat" credited as the big white dancing beav (1992–2000)
- Lauracet Simpson (Laura Simpson) – drums (1996–1997)
- Ho Ho Spade (Jeff Tucci) – guitars (1996–1997; died 2014)
- SMP (Scott Putesky) – guitar (1998–1999; died 2017)
- Claudia (Claudia Rossi) – drums (1997–1999)
- Clint Walsh – guitars (1999–2000)

=== Live members ===
- Norm Block – drums (1999–2000)
- Chris Vrenna – drums (2000)

== Discography ==
=== Albums ===
Year	Title	US CMJ	Label
1997	Sexless Demons and Scars	116	Ichiban
2000	Clear Hearts Grey Flowers	-	Risk

=== Singles ===
Year	Title	Album	Label
1993	"My Cat / Swollen"	Sexless Demons and Scars	Rectum
1996	"Girlscout / American Made"	Sexless Demons and Scars	Risk
2025	"Strawberry Gashes"	Clear Hearts Grey Flowers	House of Addams

=== EPs ===
Year	Title	Label
1998	Covetous Creature	404

=== Compilations ===
Year	Album
2006	Humid Teenage Mediocrity 1992–1996: Released: May 9, 2006; Label: Sympathy for the Record Industry; Format: CD

=== Cassette demos ===
Year	Title
1993	Children 5 And Up
1994	Boy Grinder Session^{1}
1995	Cannibal Song Book
1996	Cockroach Waltz^{1}

^{1} indicates the demos were never released.

== See also ==
- List of all-female bands
- Gidget Gein
- Jessicka
