= The Attraction to All Things Uncertain =

Studio album by Tweaker
- Released: September 18, 2001
- Genre: Electronica
- Label: Six Degrees and Waxploitation
- Producer: Chris Vrenna

Tweaker chronology
The Attraction to All Things Uncertain (2001)	2 a.m. Wakeup Call (2004)

Professional ratings
Review scores
Source	Rating
Allmusic	3/5 stars

The Attraction to All Things Uncertain is the first solo effort from Tweaker, a.k.a. Chris Vrenna, former member of Nine Inch Nails. Featuring vocals by David Sylvian, Will Oldham and Shudder to Think's Craig Wedren.

The track "Microsize Boy" was offered to the ACIDplanet community for remixing as a part of the Tweaker Remix contest.

== Track listing ==
No.	Title	Length
1.	"Linoleum" (featuring David Sylvian)	4:33
2.	"Years from Now"	2:49
3.	"Swamp" (featuring Buzz Osborne)	4:21
4.	"Turned"	2:32
5.	"Happy Child" (featuring Will Oldham)	4:27
6.	"The Drive-Bye"	4:27
7.	"Take Me Alive" (featuring Craig Wedren)	4:28
8.	"Susan"	2:48
9.	"Microsize Boy"	3:13
10.	"Full Cup of Coffee"	3:54
11.	"Empty Sheet of Paper"	3:40
12.	"After All" (featuring Craig Wedren)	5:49
13.	"Come Play"	4:53

== Personnel ==
All songs written by Chris Vrenna except "Linoleum" written by Chris Vrenna & David Sylvian, "Swamp" written by Chris Vrenna & Buzz Osborne, "Happy Child" written by Chris Vrenna & Will Oldham, "Take Me Alive" written by Chris Vrenna & Craig Wedren and "After All" written by Chris Vrenna & Dallan Baumgarten

Produced by Chris Vrenna except "Happy Child" produced by Chris Vrenna and Peter Reardon

All songs published by pink lava/ALMO Music Corp (ASCAP) except "Linoleum" published by pink lava/ALMO Music Corp (ASCAP) and Opium (Arts) Ltd. (PRS), "Swamp" published by pink lava/ALMO Music Corp (ASCAP) and B. Osborne (Copyright Control), "Happy Child" published by pink lava/ALMO Music Corp (ASCAP) and Royal Stable Music (ASCAP), "Take Me Alive" published by pink lava/ALMO Music Corp (ASCAP) and Sony/ATV (BMI) & "After All" published by pink lava/ALMO Music Corp (ASCAP) and Dallan and sepsis (ASCAP)

Engineered by Chris Vrenna, Rich Mouser, Dave Kent
Recorded at Amethyst Digital and The Mouse House, Los Angeles, CA, and Synergy, Napa, CA
Mixed by Paul Leary and Chris Vrenna at Blue World Music, Austin, TX
Mastered by Tom Baker at Precision Mastering, Los Angeles, CA

Additional Musicians:

- Guitars: Dallan Baumgarten, Mark Blasquez, King Buzzo, Wayne Kramer, Rich Mouser, Clint Walsh
- Violins: Petra Haden
- Turntables: DJ Swamp

Management: Waxploitation Entertainment, Los Angeles, CA
A&R for Waxploitation: Jeff Antebi
Business Affairs: Sendyk & Leonard
Legal: William Berrol, Esq.
Art Concept: Chris Vrenna
Art Direction/Design: Ben Tripp
Cover Painting: Joe Sorren
Photography: Roxann Arwen Mills
