= Akaneiro =

Akaneiro (Japanese: 茜色; lit. Madder color) is the Japanese word for the color of dye from the Madder plant, a dark shade of red.

Akaneiro may also refer to:

- Akaneiro ni Somaru Saka, an adult visual novel
- Akaneiro: Demon Hunters, an ARPG videogame
