= American McGee's Alice =

2000 dark fantasy video game

- North American cover art
- Developer: Rogue Entertainment (Note: Mac OS version developed by Westlake Interactive)
- Publisher: Electronic Arts (Note: Released under the EA Games banner. Mac OS version published by Aspyr Media.)
- Director: American McGee
- Producer: R. J. Berg
- Designers: American McGee; Jim Molinets
- Programmers: Peter Mack; Darin McNeil; Joe Waters
- Composer: Chris Vrenna
- Engine: id Tech 3
- Platforms: Windows; Mac OS
- Release: Windows: NA: December 5, 2000; Mac OS: NA: July 13, 2001
- Genre: Action-adventure
- Mode: Single-player

American McGee's Alice is a 2000 third-person dark fantasy action-adventure video game developed by Rogue Entertainment under the direction of designer American McGee and published by Electronic Arts under the EA Games banner. The game was originally released for Windows and Mac OS. Although a planned PlayStation 2 port was cancelled, the game was later released digitally for the PlayStation 3 and Xbox 360 via downloadable content for its sequel.

The game's premise is based on the Lewis Carroll novels Alice's Adventures in Wonderland (1865) and Through the Looking-Glass (1871) but presents a gloomy, cruel and violent version of the setting. The game centers on the novels' protagonist Alice, whose family is killed in a house fire years before the story of the game takes place. After several years of treatment in a psychiatric clinic, the emotionally traumatized Alice makes a mental retreat to Wonderland, which has been disfigured by her injured psyche.

American McGee's Alice uses the id Tech 3 game engine, which was previously used in Quake III Arena and redesigned for this game by Ritual Entertainment. The game was met with positive critical reception, with reviewers commending the high artistic and technical quality of the level design while criticizing the excessive linearity of the gameplay. As of September 2017, American McGee's Alice has sold over 1.5 million copies. A sequel, Alice: Madness Returns, was released in 2011.

== Gameplay ==
American McGee's Alice is a third-person action game in which the player controls the titular character Alice along a linear route. Alice can communicate with non-player characters, fight off enemies and bosses, and solve puzzles. Along with the basic actions of walking and jogging, Alice can jump, cling to ledges, climb and swing on ropes, swim in water, and glide over columns of steam by using her inflated dress as a makeshift parachute. The game can be played at four difficulty levels: "Easy", Medium", "Hard" and "Nightmare". The game's levels feature many platforms and other obstacles as well as puzzles that require solving for further passage through the game.

Throughout the game, Alice can obtain up to ten different weapons, known as "toys", for use against enemies. Most toys have two modes of use, which differ in the method and strength of the attack. The first toy acquired by Alice is the Vorpal Blade, which, along with the Croquet Mallet, can be used for basic melee attacks. Toys with longer range include the Ice Wand and an explosive jack-in-the-box. One particular toy, the Jabberwock's Eye Staff, is essential to the narrative and is assembled from pieces scattered throughout the setting. The game's combat system implements automatic target designation: if an enemy character is nearby, the player's weapon sight is automatically fixed upon that enemy. Outside of combat, the sight plays the role of a jump indicator by taking on the shape of two footprints that appear on the surface of any place that Alice would land if she made a jump.

Because the game takes place within Alice's imagination, the health mechanic is represented as "sanity", which is displayed as a red bar on the left-hand side of the screen. The sanity meter decreases when Alice sustains damage from enemy attacks or an environmental hazard. When the sanity meter is depleted, the game prematurely ends, after which it can be continued from where the game was last saved. A magic mechanic is represented as "willpower", and it is displayed as a blue bar on the right-hand side of the screen. Willpower is consumed when almost any toy is used, and a toy will not serve its function when Alice's willpower is too low. Certain amounts of sanity or willpower can be restored by collecting crystals of "meta-essence", the life force of Wonderland. Crystals of "meta-substance", representing the power of imagination, restore sanity and willpower simultaneously. All crystal types can be found scattered across levels and some respawn within certain places. Meta-substance can be obtained after defeating an enemy; the volume of the meta-substance is dependent on the strength of the defeated enemy.

Certain uncommon items can be found throughout the game that enhance Alice's abilities: "Ragebox Elixir" increases the damage dealt by Alice with the Vorpal Blade, the "Darkened Looking Glass" makes Alice invisible to enemies, and "Grasshopper Tea" augments Alice's speed and jumping height. These items change Alice's appearance and their effects are limited to a short period of time, after which Alice returns to her original state.

== Plot ==
World map of Wonderland

In 1863, Alice Liddell is awoken from a dream of Wonderland by a house fire. Although she is able to save herself, her parents are killed and she is left with serious burns and psychological damage. Alice is brought to Rutledge Asylum in a state of catatonia, where several years of treatment fail to rouse her from her stupor. When Alice's toy rabbit seems to call to her for help, she mentally retreats to Wonderland, which appears to have been disfigured by her broken mind. Alice meets the Cheshire Cat, who invites her to follow the White Rabbit. She learns from nearby village inhabitants that the Queen of Hearts has put Wonderland in decline and despondency, and that the White Rabbit has promised a champion in Alice. Alice is directed to an old gnome who can aid her pursuit of the White Rabbit by reducing her size. The gnome and Alice infiltrate the Fortress of Doors and enter the school inside, where they create an elixir that shrinks Alice and allows her passage to the Vale of Tears.

After aiding the Mock Turtle in retrieving his stolen shell from the Duchess, Alice catches up to the White Rabbit, who takes her in the direction of the Caterpillar before he is crushed by the normal-sized Hatter's foot. Alice meets with the Caterpillar, who explains to her that Wonderland's current form is the result of Alice's survivor guilt and advises her to slay the Queen of Hearts to restore Wonderland's integrity. Alice returns to normal size after nibbling from a mushroom guarded by the Voracious Centipede. In the center of a plateau, Alice discovers a piece of the Jabberwock's Eye Staff. The voice of an unseen oracle tells Alice that before the Queen of Hearts can be slain, Alice must first eliminate the Queen's sentinel – the Jabberwock, who she must kill to obtain the final piece of the Eye Staff. In her search for the remaining pieces of the Eye Staff, Alice defeats the Red King in the chess-themed Looking-Glass Land, as well as the Hatter's minions Tweedledum and Tweedledee. Alice later finds that the Hatter is conducting cruel experiments on the March Hare and Dormouse, and he is keeping the Gryphon captive. After killing the Hatter, Alice frees the Gryphon, who offers to rally forces against the Queen of Hearts and takes Alice to the Land of Fire and Brimstone, the abode of the Jabberwock. Within the remains of Alice's old home, the Jabberwock wracks Alice with guilt over her parents' deaths and overpowers her in a fight until the Gryphon returns and rescues Alice by depriving the Jabberwock of one of his eyes.

With the Jabberwock's Eye Staff fully assembled, the Gryphon directs Alice to Queensland and takes off with the intention of stopping the Jabberwock himself. On her way to the Queen of Hearts's castle, Alice sees the Gryphon and the Jabberwock engaged in an aerial battle, which ends with the Gryphon mortally wounded. Following Alice's victory against the Jabberwock, the dying Gryphon entrusts Alice with the final battle against the Queen of Hearts. At the entrance to the Queen's Hall, the Cheshire Cat attempts to confess to Alice about the nature of the Queen of Hearts, but he is suddenly executed as he states that "You are two parts of the same..." Alice engages in a fight with a figure puppeteered by the real Queen of Hearts, a giant fleshy tentacled creature who warns Alice that destroying her will destroy them both. Upon Alice's final victory over the Queen of Hearts, Wonderland is restored, and many of the characters who had died in the journey are revived. Her mind repaired, Alice leaves Rutledge Asylum.

== Development ==
=== Conception ===
Creative director American McGee had been working as a level designer at id Software on the Doom and Quake series. During the development of Quake II, the team watched a demonstration of an early version of Valve's GoldSrc engine, a heavily modified, licensed version of id's Quake engine. The demo showed the capability of manipulating the camera to capture cinematic-like cutscenes and provide narrative. Though McGee was impressed with this novel use and wanted to use their technology to tell stories, he said that others at id did not want to go in that direction.

After leaving id Software in 1997, McGee was inspired to design a game that did not involve space marines, guns, aliens and outer space, which were the common themes in the Doom and Quake series. McGee's dark and lustrous image of Alice's Adventures in Wonderland was primarily inspired by the Crystal Method track "Trip Like I Do", in which he heard the word "wonder". Following this inspiration, McGee and his creative partner R.J. Berg began sketching a narrative and preliminary designs. McGee's goal was to present what he considered to be a natural extension of the setting and characters of the original Alice novels. Many of the early experiments with evolving the material of the novel – which included manga, futuristic, cartoon and sexual interpretations – strayed from McGee's intended direction. Sketches of Alice, the Cheshire Cat and the Hatter by Terry Smith and Norm Felchle played a decisive role in establishing the game's visual style and served as a foundation for subsequent concept art. McGee sought to omit shortcomings in products that he had previously designed, such as recreating reality instead of creating a fantastic world, reusing traditional weapons, and unremarkable characters. The game had a budget of $4.5 million. Around twenty-seven people worked on it.

While working on the game's plot, McGee considered several approaches to Alice's return to Wonderland, one of which involved a modern-day Alice murdering her abusive stepfather in reality while journeying through Wonderland, which was rejected by EA. Another approach involved the projection of Alice's parents and acquaintances onto the characters of Wonderland and Alice investigating the cause of her father's death. After discarding this concept as too complicated, McGee ultimately aimed for "the simplest story that told the most". Aside from the reappearance of characters and locations mentioned in the novels, no references to the novels' plots are made in the game, as McGee did not intend for the game to be a continuation or competing version of Carroll's work. The development team solely used the original novels as reference material, ignoring film adaptations and other derivative works.

The game's title, which includes McGee's name, was chosen at EA's insistence, primarily for the ease of registering and protecting a new trademark. McGee admitted that he did not support the title, as he opined that it put the rest of the development team in the background. American McGee's Alice is McGee's debut work as a lead game designer.

=== Development and marketing ===
EA licensed Ritual Entertainment's Heavy Metal: F.A.K.K.² engine, which is in turn a modified Quake III Arena engine. The most notable changes in the engine include the use of the Tiki model system, which enables the engine to use skeletal animation among other things, the Babble dialog system which enables lip synching of audio with character animations, dynamic music system, scriptable camera, particle system and extended shader support. The changes implemented to the engine for Alice remained minimal however. The game's .bsp files even retain F.A.K.K.²'s headers, albeit sporting a different version number.

An early version of the game featured the ability to summon the Cheshire Cat to aid the player in battle. Though this feature was removed from the final product, beta screenshots of this version do exist online. In the final product, the player can press a button to summon the Cheshire Cat at any time, though he merely provides cryptic advice on the current situation and does nothing to aid Alice if she is being attacked. An Alice port for the then-unreleased PlayStation 2 was also in development but was later cancelled, which caused Rogue Entertainment to shut down, another decision which angered American McGee and resulted him leaving EA in frustration.

The game's box art was altered after release to show Alice holding the Ice Wand instead of the Vorpal Blade and to reduce the skeletal character of the Cheshire Cat's anatomy. EA cited complaints from various consumer groups as its reason for altering the original art, though McGee stated the alteration was made due to internal concerns at EA.

Alice was EA's first M-rated game, a rating which McGee fought to obtain, because he did not want an Alice product to be sold at Christmas time, since parents could be confused, thinking that the game was intended to be a gift for children. However, in a 2009 interview, McGee expressed regret for his decision and said that the violence in the game did not warrant an M-rating; he felt that consumers should buy products responsibly after referring to the recommendations of the ESRB.

== Soundtrack ==
The game's music was composed and recorded by Chris Vrenna, and was released as a soundtrack by Six Degrees Records. The album was released on CD on October 16, 2001, and on digital platforms on April 24, 2007. The style of the soundtrack is dominated by ambient and experimental electronica. In addition to composing the music, Vrenna mixed, produced and arranged the album. He spent several months on eBay, where he purchased mechanical toys, a xylophone, a cuckoo clock and tubular bells in order to record sound samples for the tracks. The soundtrack features toy instruments, percussion, music box sounds, ticking clocks, creaking doors, female voices, maniacal laughter, screaming, crying, and baby talk. Mark Blasquez wrote the lyrics, Peter Reardon remixed the track "Flying On The Wings Of Steam (Remix)", and Jeff Antebi managed it. The recording featured singer Jessicka.

Marilyn Manson was originally involved scoring the music for the game. His composition has been described by American McGee as "very cool" and having "a very beautiful Beatles-in-their-harpsichord-and-Hookah-pipe-days-sound to it." Manson's contributions persisted into the final product, notably the influence of alchemy and the character of the Mad Hatter whose adaptation was somewhat influenced by him; for a time Manson was considered for the voice of the Hatter.

== Marketing ==
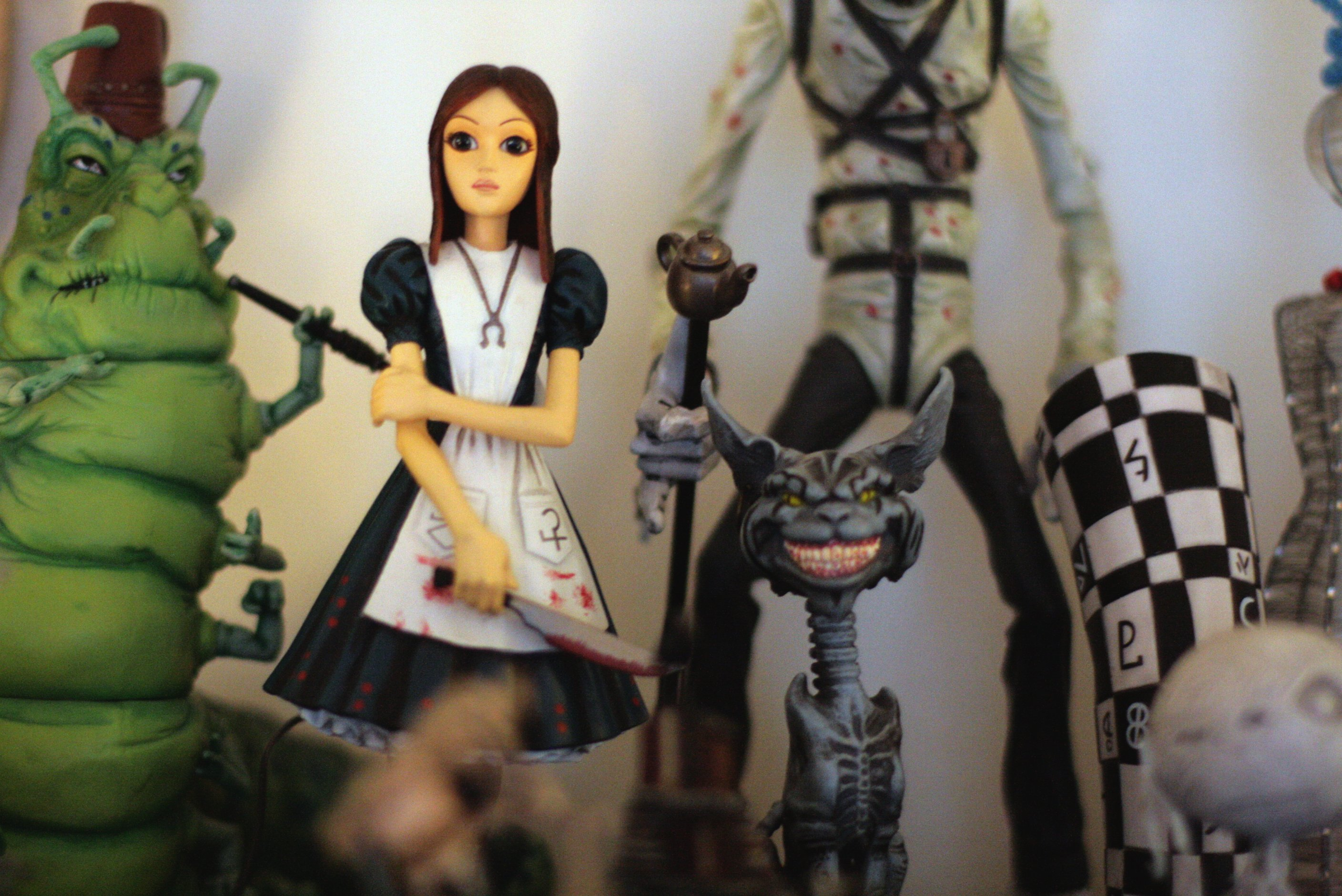
Milo's Workshop's Alice and the Cheshire Cat figurines

In 2000, prior to the games' release, McGee hosted the US national Alice Wicked Wonderland Tour with electronic musician Green Velvet. At these shows, footage of the game would be released and would be promoted as a multimedia event. Eventually photos from the San Francisco shows on the tour would be available on the official Alice site. A strategy guide by Prima Games was published in 2000. By January 2002, along with the game's film adaptation, a comic book series and a toy line dedicated to the game were in development.

In 2004, EA and Atari released a collaboration 7" clear blue vinyl American McGee's Alice LP of two sides, Side A: 'Wonderland Woods (Tweaker Remix)' and Side B: 'Take the Pill' from Enter the Matrix composed, produced and remixed by Chris Vrenna. These LPs were limited to 500 copies and signed by McGee and Vrenna and distributed by Waxploitation Records.

In 2006, Muckle Mannequins created life-sized statues of Alice and the Cheshire Cat on stands with variants for video game stores for international promotion. Costume ware was released under McGee's company Mysterious. Milo's Workshop completed four editions of releases from 2000 to 2009 of official figurines with rare editions of variants of several Alice characters.

In 2010, Epic Weapons created a life-size replica of the Vorpal Blade to commemorate the game's tenth anniversary. The blade was made from stainless steel with patterns engraved on the blade and handle. The company created 1,000 copies of the blade, with the first 25 being sold in an auction held from July 22 to July 31, 2010. In 2011, for Alice: Madness Returns, there was a new Vorpal blade, in which the two were sold as a packaged deal.

== Reception ==
Reception

Aggregate score
Aggregator	Score
Metacritic	85/100

Review scores
Publication	Score
AllGame	4/5
Computer Gaming World	3.5/5
Edge	4/10
Eurogamer	8/10
Game Informer	9/10
GamePro	4/5
GameRevolution	B
GameSpot	7.3/10
GameSpy	93%
GameZone	10/10
Hyper	84/100
IGN	9.4/10
Next Generation	4/5
PC Gamer (US)	88%
X-Play	3/5
The Cincinnati Enquirer	5/5

In the United States, American McGee's Alice sold 360,000 units by August 2006. As of September 2017, the game has sold 1.5 million copies. At the time, this led Edge to declare it the country's 47th-best-selling computer game released since January 2000.

The game was ultimately released on December 5, 2000, receiving praise for its visuals; the graphics were very elaborate for their time. Many levels depict a world of chaos and wonder, some reminiscent of the inside of an asylum or a madhouse, visually linking Wonderland to Alice's reality. The exterior views of Wonderland show the Queen of Hearts' tentacles dipping out of buildings and mountain sides, especially in Queensland. Alice received "favorable" reviews according to the review aggregation website Metacritic. GameSpot said, "While you'll undoubtedly enjoy the imaginative artwork, you might end up disappointed with just how straightforward the underlying game really is."

In her article "Wonderland's become quite strange: From Lewis Carroll's Alice to American McGee's Alice", literary critic Cathlena Martin argues that the game "provides a reinterpreted version of Alice and the whole of wonderland that may have some players questioning which aspects are from Carroll and which are from McGee, thus potentially leading to a rereading of Carroll through the darker lens of McGee's Alice. This reinterpretation of Alice shows the versatility and mutability of the story across time and discourse." Martin also notes that the game is successful largely in part to the narrative structure of Carroll's tales, which are built around games - cards and chess - themselves.

Blake Fischer reviewed the PC version of the game for Next Generation, rating it four stars out of five, and stated that "Alice is an incredibly beautiful and well-designed shooter. If you're looking for more, you may pass, but otherwise it's a game you won't want to miss."

== Film adaptation ==
=== Conception and Wes Craven ===
A film adaptation of American McGee's Alice was planned prior to the game's release. Scott Faye, a spokesman for Dimension Films and an old acquaintance of McGee, visited EA to negotiate an adaptation of an EA product. Faye and other Dimension Films representatives were shown gameplay footage of Alice and were impressed by its visuals. Later, Miramax head Bob Weinstein was shown the game's trailer, after which he immediately (and without waiting for the opinion of the board of directors) supported the production of a film adaptation. On July 5, 2000, FGN Online published an exclusive piece claiming that EA had signed an agreement with Miramax to create a film based on the game. According to the publisher's source, American McGee would be involved in the film's production, potentially as a creative director or co-producer.

On December 7, 2000, McGee formally announced the film adaptation, which had been entrusted with Collision Entertainment, a subsidiary of Dimension Films, after ten months of negotiations. Wes Craven and John August were attached as director and screenwriter, with McGee co-producing the film alongside Collision Entertainment, and Abandon Entertainment acting as international distributor. No actors had yet been signed on, but Natalie Portman was rumored to have expressed interest. Milla Jovovich and Christina Ricci were also rumored to be attached. In September 2001, August explained that he had turned in a script treatment for Alice and was not attached to develop fuller drafts for the film adaptation.

In December 2001, Craven announced that the film would be a computer-animated feature with a tentative 2003 release date. In February 2002, Dimension Films signed brother screenwriters Jon and Erich Hoeber to write a new screenplay for Alice. In July 2003, the brothers announced that they had completed the script for the film adaptation. On March 4, 2004, McGee reported that the project had moved from Dimension Films to 20th Century Fox.

=== Marcus Nispel ===
On June 21, 2005, The Hollywood Reporter reported that Universal Pictures had acquired the film and signed Sarah Michelle Gellar on for the lead role, with Marcus Nispel attached to direct and the Hoeber brothers still attached to write. On February 8, 2006, Scott Faye, who had become a producer of the project, announced that filming would begin in the summer of 2006, with a budget of $40 to $50 million and a tentative 2007 release date. By 2008, the project was in turnaround, and Nispel and Gellar's involvement had ceased. Rumors circulated of Jane March being cast as the Queen of Hearts, which Faye denied.

=== Short films ===
In July 2013, American McGee announced that he had reached an agreement with Collision Entertainment, which still owned the Alice film rights. The company stated its readiness to transfer these rights to McGee, but demanded $500,000 for them. McGee decided to raise this amount from crowdfunding via Kickstarter. By this time, funds were already being raised via Kickstarter for Spicy Horse's OZombie project; according to McGee, any surplus funds would be set aside for film production. With an additional $100,000 raised, Spicy Horse would be able to create short animated films, and if the initially required amount is exceeded by $500,000, the studio would receive the rights to create a full-length feature film. On July 14, the Kickstarter campaign for OZombie was closed due to insufficient funds, with McGee shifting his focus toward securing the Alice film rights.

With the success of earning the funds to produce Alice: Otherlands, McGee stated his desire to continue to work on the possibility of adapting the series into a feature film on Kickstarter. On February 17, 2014, McGee announced that he and his team have secured a British screenwriter to write the film's script. On April 16, 2014, he assured fans that the film is still in production and is currently working with a producer in Hollywood who they have licensed the rights from, but has run into a few difficulties along the way.

On July 10, 2014, McGee informed fans that the progress on the feature film has come to a temporary halt. McGee stated that he had secured the rights only to develop the feature film's story and production and needed to acquire the film rights completely before proceeding further. He was speaking with potential investors and financiers to gather the $400,000 (~$530,127 in 2025) required but on January 8, 2015, McGee stated that negotiations for the feature film had gone on a hiatus. In 2025, American McGee revealed on Reddit that the all films and TV projects was "dead" due to a failed pitch meeting, citing its concept involving time travel and a modern-day setting as the reason it failed.

== Television adaptation ==
On January 31, 2022, it was announced that Radar Pictures – in partnership with Abandon Entertainment – was developing a television adaptation of American McGee's Alice written and co-produced by David Hayter. No broadcaster or streaming platform has yet acquired the series. In 2025, American McGee revealed on Reddit that the series was "dead" due to a failed pitch meeting, citing its concept involving time travel and a modern-day setting as the reason it failed.

== Sequel ==
As the plans for the movie adaptation of American McGee's Alice started to take longer and longer, in 2007 interest at Electronic Arts rose in a remake of the game and work was started on a sequel. On February 19, 2009, EA CEO John Riccitiello announced at D.I.C.E. 2009 that a new installment to the series is in the works for Xbox 360, PlayStation 3, and PC.

It was developed by Spicy Horse, who worked on American McGee's Grimm. Two pieces of concept art were released, depicting Alice and large allied birds fighting an oversized, semi-mechanized snail and its children on top of a lighthouse, and Alice swimming in a pond, with the Cheshire Cat's face in the background.

In November 2009, a fan-made video based on the Alice 2 announcement was mistaken by gaming websites as a teaser trailer for the game. In it, Alice is in therapy after a relapse nine months after the events of the first game, and she appears to hallucinate an image of the Cheshire Cat in place of her doctor.

On June 15, 2010, EA filed a trademark on the name Alice: Madness Returns, the suspected sequel to American McGee's Alice. While the sequel was formally announced via press release on February 19, 2009, the sequel's title was confirmed during the EA Studio Showcase the following day.

The game was released on June 14, 2011, in North America, June 16, 2011, in Europe, June 17, 2011, in the United Kingdom and July 21, 2011, in Japan under the title Alice: Madness Returns for PC, Mac, Xbox 360, and PlayStation 3. The Xbox 360 and PlayStation 3 versions came with a redemption code that gave the player a free download of American McGee's Alice. This version is available through backward compatibility on Xbox One and Xbox Series X/S, and is part of the EA Play service on these platforms. It is found under the DLC for Madness Returns.

== See also ==
- Clive Barker's Undying, another auteur-branded PC horror game by EA Games released around the same time
