= Robin Moulder =

American musician

- Also known as: Agent Moulder
- Born: Robin April Moulder; April 2, 1966 (age 60)
- Genres: Thrash metal, alternative metal, industrial rock, alternative rock
- Occupations: Musician, Video game developer
- Instruments: Bass guitar, keyboards, programming
- Years active: 1989–present

Robin Moulder (born April 2, 1966) is an American entrepreneur, producer, and musician, best known as being one of the founders of the riot goth-girl group Jack Off Jill and her subsequent project, TCR. She is a bassist, pianist, and programmer. She is the CEO and co-founder of 3lb Games, a virtual and mixed reality video game developer.

== History ==
Robin Moulder grew up with one sister Helen Moulder and two brothers Dave and Al Moulder. Moulder began studying music on trumpet and piano and initially didn't envision a musical career for herself. She received a Bachelor of Science in Engineering. Her first job out of college took her to Florida. She began playing keyboard for a live band, and moved to bass to fill the void left by a departing bandmate. She quickly discovered an aptitude for the instrument, and began looking for other people who shared her outlook on music. She found them in Tenni Ah-Cha-Cha, Jessicka Addams, and Michelle Inhell, and the four of them created Jack Off Jill.

=== Jack Off Jill ===
Moulder was with Jack Off Jill from its inception to its demise, having written or co-written most of the music for the band over its lifetime. She and Jessicka were the only two permanent members, watching over a revolving door of musicians throughout the band's history, including Scott Putesky, a.k.a. Daisy Berkowitz, the original guitarist from Marilyn Manson, and Chris Vrenna of Tweaker, formerly of Nine Inch Nails. Fodera and Moulder finally called it quits in 2000, with Moulder not involved in the 2015 reunion of Jack Off Jill, possibly over some feud between the two musicians which remains unclear.

On May 26, 2021, Poppy released a cover of Jack Off Jill's iconic song "Fear of Dying". The cover mainly keeps in line with the original song which was recorded as a single for their final album, Clear Hearts Grey Flowers.

=== TCR ===
After the breakup Moulder struck up a friendship with TC, formerly of the band Triggerpimp, and the two women agreed to collaborate on a project together, which would later be called TCR. When Moulder moved to Detroit to serve as the Chief Technology Officer for a startup company, she and TC stayed in contact and began crafting their release via phone, FedEx, and FTP along with guest musicians such as Chris Vrenna, Scott Putesky, and method from Godhead. Released in 2004, The Chrome Recordings was called the "best goth/industrial/whatever releases of the year" by some reviewers.

TCR's music is self described as "the sound of corroding chrome. A fusion of metal, industrial, rock, and goth, with a dose of punk aggression". The Chrome Recordings was their only album.

=== 3lb Games ===
In 2008, Moulder co-founded 3lb Games, a video game development studio. 3lb Games started in mobile gaming and transitioned to building apps for virtual reality in 2016. In 2017, 3lb released its first VR title, Space Dragon, a bullet hell arcade shooter on Steam. The game is also available for Meta Quest, Oculus Rift, and Pico headsets. 3lb also developed Vault of Stars, a single player fantasy adventure game for Meta Quest and Pico. Most recently, 3lb released Grokit, a hand tracking mixed reality party game for Meta Quest. In addition to their own games, 3lb Games has also worked on projects for other games, such as the VR playground for Slime Rancher from Monomi Park.

=== Personal life ===
Moulder is married to game designer Colin McComb. They have two children. He moved to Detroit with her after she got offered a job, shortly after they met. Together with her husband, they have created 3lbGames, a company specialized in game design and development.

== Discography ==
=== With Jack Off Jill ===
==== Albums/CDs ====
- Children 5 and Up (1993)
- The Boygrinder Sessions (1994)
- Cannibal Song Book (1995)
- Cockroach Waltz (1996)
- Sexless Demons and Scars (1997)
- Clear Hearts Grey Flowers (2000)

==== Singles and EPs ====
- My Cat/Swollen (1993 and 1994)
- Girlscout/ American Made ( 7" Risk Records 1996)
- Covetous Creature (1998)

=== With TCR ===
- The Chrome Recordings (2004)
