= Call the Time Eternity =

Studio album by Tweaker
- Released: October 23, 2012
- Recorded: The Treehouse of Terror, Sherman Oaks, CA
- Genre: Alternative rock Industrial rock Electronica; Progressive rock
- Length: 39:32
- Label: Metropolis
- Producer: Chris Vrenna, Jesse Hall

Tweaker chronology
2 a.m. Wakeup Call (2004)	Call the Time Eternity (2012)	And Then There's Nothing (2013)

Call the Time Eternity is the third album from the band Tweaker.

== Reception ==
ReGen Magazine said the "bulk of the album consists of atmospheric, instrumental pieces punctuated by several collaborations on which the vocals arrange the somewhat free flowing structures into catchy, conventional songs". 303 Magazine complimented the album, stating, "the 11-track gem floats like an aural reverie–the mystery of whose veneer glows soft as Gaussian blur".

== Track listing ==
No.	Title	Length
1.	"Ponygrinder"	4:16
2.	"Nothing At All" (featuring Jessicka Addams)	4:26
3.	"A Bit Longer Than Usual"	4:13
4.	"Areas of the Brain"	4:33
5.	"Hoarding Granules"	3:04
6.	"Getting Through Many a Bad Night"	2:12
7.	"Grounded" (featuring kaRIN)	5:08
8.	"This Is Ridiculous"	2:14
9.	"I Don't Care Anymore"	4:18
10.	"Wasted Time"	2:46
11.	"Fine" (featuring Abhorrent Derelict)	3:42

== Personnel ==
- Chris Vrenna: producer and performer
- Jesse Hall: producer and performer
