= TC Smith =

American singer

TC Smith, also known as "TC/TNT," is an American singer and live programmer best known for her work with Triggerpimp, Anna Thema, TCR, Satiate, and Meridian Dream (with Rae DiLeo) as well as her voiceover work with producer Joseph Bishara. Her voice talents have been featured in movie trailers for films such The Village, The Amityville Horror (2005), and Silent Hill. Her voice work also appears in the movie score for The Gravedancers, a 2005 horror film, along with Melora Creager of Rasputina.
