= CD-Action =

Polish video game magazine

- Editor: Dawid Bojarski
- Categories: Video game magazine
- Frequency: Quarterly (since Jan 2022)
- Circulation: 70,000 (July 2019)
- Founded: 1996
- Company: Gaming Tech Esports Media SA
- Country: Poland
- Based in: street Słonimskiego 1A, 50-304 Wrocław
- Language: Polish
- Website: cdaction.pl
- ISSN: 1426-2916

CD-Action is a Polish magazine devoted to video games. It was founded in 1996 and published in Wrocław. The magazine was published in a cycle that was not exactly monthly, as subsequent issues of the magazine were published every 28 days. As a result, thirteen issues were released annually. In January 2022, the magazine switched to a quarterly publication cycle. The typical volume of an issue is 124 pages (until March 2009 it was 148 pages). From December 2006 to July 2011, it was published only in a version with one double-layer DVD ( previously there were versions with four CDs for readers without DVD readers). From August 2011 to July 2018, two DVD9 discs were added in a cardboard packaging. In August 2018, the publishing house decided to stop adding a physical medium, replacing it with a scratch card with a code.

== History ==
=== 1996 ===
- April 1 – first issue of "CD-Action" (circulation: 12,500 copies) published by Silver Shark
- July – first full version of the program
- December – first full version of the game (Polish Blood Law)

=== 1997 ===
- autumn – Zbigniew Bański becomes the editor-in-chief of "CD-Action"

=== 1998 ===
- July – the first full version of the game occupying a separate CD (Pro Pinball: Timeshock!)

=== 1999 ===
- March – circulation exceeded 100,000. copies; website start

=== 2000 ===
- July – circulation 200,000 copies; 50th issue
- changed publisher to Future Network Publishing

=== 2001 ===
- January – change of publishing house to Bauer
- July – 3 CDs permanently; a DVD edition was released in parallel about once every six months
- December – the thirteenth issue of the year appeared for the first time (13/2001)

=== 2002 ===
- July – for the first time in the history of the magazine, a film appeared (The Return of Godzilla)

=== 2003 ===
- April 1 – the journal's internet forum was established
- August – DVD edition now released every two months

=== 2004 ===
- January – the fourth CD is permanently added to the magazine
- June – 100th issue – CD-Action 06/2004
- September – monthly release of the DVD version in parallel with the CD version

=== 2005 ===
- December – increase in DVD capacity (from 4.7 GB to 8.5 GB)

=== 2006 ===
- September – the first full version of the game before the world premiere in the history of the magazine (Bad Day L.A.)
- December – last issue of the magazine on CD

=== 2007 ===
- August – change of editor-in-chief; Zbigniew Bański's place (who became the publishing director) was taken by his current deputy, Jerzy Prosta, and the function of deputy editor-in-chief was taken by Maciej Kuc, known to readers as Qn'ik, took over

=== 2010 ===
- January – change of the appearance and content of the magazine, including: Gamewalker's elimination; adding reviews of console games and other minor changes

=== 2012 ===
- February – 200th issue – CD-Action 02/2012 [12]

=== 2013 ===
- January - changing the paper to a more slippery and more durable one, dictated by the start of printing the magazine in a private printing house of the Bauer publishing house.

=== 2018 ===
- August – the first edition in which the DVD was replaced by a scratch card with a code.

=== 2019 ===
- September – 300th issue – CD-Action 11/2019.

=== 2020 ===
- April – first issue of the magazine in electronic version. Electronic and traditional versions for the first time in history without digital additions (5/2020).
- At the end of April, the editorial office was given notice of termination, and at the same time the publisher announced that it was looking for an investor.
- July – the rights to the CD-Action brand were sold by Bauer Publishing House to the Fantasyexpo gaming agency. A change in the position of editor-in-chief was also announced, and Dawid Bojarski became the editor-in-chief.
- December - the first issue, in which the characteristic image of a Discobolus in the logo, present on the covers of the magazine from the beginning of its existence, was abandoned.

=== 2022 ===
- January - the editorial office announced the change to a quarterly publishing cycle.

== Substantive content ==
There are 124 pages of permanent sections (order as in the magazine):

- Info – news from the world of games
- In production – game announcements written based on materials provided by the developers and impressions from the beta versions of the games
- GameWalker – editorial comments on the games reviewed in a given issue
- Reviews – descriptions of reviewers' impressions of played computer games with a rating on a scale from 1 to 10
- Kaszanka Zone – reviews of extremely poor games. The department was closed in January 2010, but was reopened after eight years.
- Journalism - a section devoted to general computer issues (Internet, programming, etc.), gaming-related topics, e.g. the history of computer games, companies producing games and computers, columns, thoughts, information about new technologies, etc.
- Magazine – a review of news from the world of film, music and literature
- Technologies – all new hardware, hardware tests, advice, etc.
- Action Redaction – readers' lists to which Smuggler, Mr Jedi and 9kier respond, with occasional contributions from other editors
- Szpile – mockingly about the gaming industry
- Loot – descriptions of full versions of games included in the magazine

In the past, there were several departments that have been abolished:

- Subject of the issue - usually contained one, extensive text on a topic related to currently important events in the gaming industry. From issue 2/2010 it is no longer distinguished in the table of contents as a separate section.
- Controversial games - another subdivision of the journalistic section. It featured games that were considered controversial in the industry.
- Casual - a humorous corner
