= Alice: Madness Returns =

2011 video game

- Developer: Spicy Horse
- Publisher: Electronic Arts
- Director: American McGee
- Designer: American McGee
- Artist: Ken Wong
- Writer: R. J. Berg
- Composers: Jason Tai; Marshall Crutcher; Chris Vrenna
- Engine: Unreal Engine 3
- Platforms: Windows; PlayStation 3; Xbox 360
- Release: NA: June 14, 2011; EU: June 16, 2011; JP: July 21, 2011
- Genre: Action-adventure
- Mode: Single-player

Alice: Madness Returns is a 2011 action-adventure game developed by Spicy Horse and released by Electronic Arts for Windows, PlayStation 3 and Xbox 360. The game is the sequel to American McGee's Alice (2000) and was directed by series creator American McGee.

Alice: Madness Returns follows Alice Liddell, a young woman suffering from trauma caused by the death of her family in a fire. Alice was discharged from a psychiatric clinic and now lives in an orphanage for mentally traumatized orphans under the care of Dr. Angus Bumby. To get rid of the trauma and learn the truth about her past, she once again falls into Wonderland, where a new evil force has corrupted it.

The game received mixed-to-positive reviews from critics. American McGee had made several attempts to start production of another sequel. In 2023, EA, which owns rights to the franchise, rejected the pitch.

== Gameplay ==
Alice as seen in Madness Returns, wielding the Vorpal Blade

Alice: Madness Returns is a hack 'n' slash puzzle platformer played from a third-person perspective. The player controls Alice for the entirety of the game for running, jumping, dodging, attacking, and shrinking.

In combat, Alice gains a small number of weapons that can be utilized in several ways. Her primary weapon is the Vorpal Blade, a decorated kitchen knife. The remainder of her arsenal is somewhat akin to the benign and mundane items that take on a deadly quality in Alice's tainted Wonderland in the first game. The Pepper Grinder becomes a crank operated Gatling gun, used to attack at a distance and pepper pig snouts. The Hobby Horse is used as a sledgehammer to inflict heavy damage and break barriers and defenses. The Teapot Cannon fires tea sieves that explode to cause heavy damage and, like the Hobby Horse, break barriers. By collecting teeth that are dropped by foes or found scattered about the levels, the player can upgrade these items to more powerful versions. Two other weapons cannot be upgraded, primarily because they are more defensive than directly offensive: the Umbrella acts as a shield that can be used to deflect and reflect most incoming projectiles; The Clockwork Bomb is a time-delayed/remote-controlled rabbit alarm clock that does a minimal amount of damage to enemies, but its usefulness is better illustrated as a decoy, as well as a weight to keep switches temporarily depressed.

Alice's health is tracked by a number of rose petals. Should Alice's health fall to zero during gameplay, the player is forced to start at the most recent checkpoint. They can also regenerate health by going into giant purple flowers. Falling off platforms into bottomless pits or dangerous liquids do not damage Alice but restart her at a nearby platform. The game also introduces Hysteria, which can be used when Alice's health is very low, and it can only be used for a limited amount of time.

While working on each level, the player can discover various secrets. A primary mechanic is to use Alice's shrinking potion to reduce in size, allowing her to walk through small spaces like keyholes, but also reveals invisible platforms and surfaces; after returning to normal size, these platforms slowly fade back to invisibility, requiring the player to remember their location. Pig's snouts, which make noise when the player is close, can be struck with the pepper grinder to reveal new paths. Radula rooms provide a short challenge to the player, which on completion grants a jar of paint; obtaining four jars earns the player another rose for Alice's health. Memories can be picked up that provide voiceovers revealing parts of the game's backstory.

Upon completion, the player can start a new game plus, letting them play through the game again but keeping all their weapons and upgrades from the previous attempt. From the menu, the player can also review the memories that they have found within the game.

== Synopsis ==
=== Setting ===
Within events of the first game, Alice Liddell, believing herself responsible for a fire that consumed her home and her family, escapes into a twisted version of Wonderland. While held at Rutledge Asylum for treatment, Alice was able to conquer her doubts and was eventually released from the ward. Madness Returns takes place in 1875, a year after Alice's release. Alice, now 19 years old, resides at an orphanage in Victorian London, under the care of Dr. Angus Bumby, a psychiatrist who uses hypnosis to help his child patients forget their memories. Though she believes that she is fine, Alice still has hallucinations of Wonderland.

=== Plot ===
During an errand, Alice is struck by a hallucination and believes herself to be in Wonderland again. Though initially idyllic, the peaceful land quickly becomes corrupted by an entity called the Infernal Train that rampages through it, leaving behind the Ruin, a force that attempts to stop Alice. Alice meets with the Cheshire Cat, who affirms that it is some outside force, not Alice, that has caused this corruption, and urges her to seek out former friends and foes to discover the source of the Train. Throughout the rest of the game, Alice briefly returns to reality between episodes occurring within Wonderland. In the real world, Alice learns from the family solicitor, Wilton J. Radcliffe, that her older sister, Elizabeth (nicknamed "Lizzie"), was the first to die in the fire, despite being the farthest from its source, and had been locked in her room.

Within the corrupted Wonderland, Alice attempts to learn more from Wonderland's various citizens, including the Duchess, the Mad Hatter, the March Hare and the Dormouse, the Mock Turtle, the Walrus and the Carpenter, the Caterpillar, and the White King. She is ultimately told that the Queen of Hearts still lives despite her defeat at Alice's hands before, though in a diminished capacity. At the Queen's castle, Alice discovers the Queen's true form, which resembles her younger self. The Queen reveals that an entity called the Dollmaker created the Infernal Train and is the one corrupting Wonderland.

Returning to London, Alice starts to recall her memories of the night of the fire and realizes that Dr. Bumby is responsible for the deaths of her sister and her whole family. She comes to the conclusion that Dr. Bumby is attempting to erase the memories of the fire from her mind and, as he has done with other children, trying to leave her (and the orphans) as "blank toys" to be taken by abusive masters and child molesters for a price. Furious, Alice confronts both Dr. Bumby in the real world at the Moorgate station and the Dollmaker, Dr. Bumby's Wonderland counterpart, in her fantasy on the Infernal Train. Dr. Bumby admits to his crimes and even attests to setting Alice's home on fire after Lizzie refused his advances, removing any witnesses to having raped her that night. He points out that by wiping out her Wonderland, he will make her forget the events of that night, while he continues as a member of high society and secretly sells young children for prostitution. Alice defeats the Dollmaker in Wonderland, giving her the strength in the real world and in her mind to push Dr. Bumby into the path of an oncoming train, killing him.

As Alice leaves the station, she finds herself in a hybrid vision of London mixed with Wonderland, Londerland. Alice wanders into the unknown terrain as the Cheshire Cat monologues that Alice has found the truth that was "worth the pain fighting for", and Wonderland, though damaged, is safe for the time being.

== Development ==
Rumors of a sequel to Alice first developed shortly after the original game was released to critical and commercial success, though at that time, the development team behind the original were working on the ultimately-canceled spin-off, American McGee's Oz. As the development of the movie adaptation of American McGee's Alice took longer and the original game became more of a cult classic, in 2007 interest at Electronic Arts rose in a remake of the game and work was started on a sequel. However, when the movie adaptation fell through, plans for a sequel were shelved, and remained so for nearly a decade. At the February 2009 D.I.C.E. Summit, EA announced a sequel, which at the time had the working title The Return of American McGee's Alice. Two pieces of concept art accompanied the announcement, along with the information that the original game's writer and executive producer would also return for the sequel. In November of that year, a fan-made trailer (with the title "The Return of Alice") was mistaken by gaming news outlets as an official teaser for the game, in which Alice is in therapy after a relapse nine months following the events of the first game, and appears to hallucinate an image of the Cheshire Cat in place of her doctor.

At EA's Studio Showcase in July 2010, more details about the game were shown, including its current title, Alice: Madness Returns. In addition to further pieces of concept art and actual, in-game screenshots, the first official teaser was released. Despite (or perhaps because of) the fan video eight months prior, it also portrays Alice in therapy: after being hypnotized by her doctor in a bizarre office filled with prosthetic arms hanging from the ceiling, as she opens her mouth to speak, large amounts of blood and teeth pour out. As the game title appears, a whispering voice is heard saying, "What have you done?" During the 2010 Tokyo Game Show, new assets, including a second trailer, were released. Alice is seen strolling through a London street, and eventually approaches an area littered with toys and a toy store window, which contains a set depicting the Mad Hatter, the Dormouse and the March Hare taking tea. Suddenly, she sees an image of her deceased parents in the window's reflection but turns around to find no one there. The window begins to burn and the silhouette of the Queen of Hearts appears before it explodes in flames, and the Queen's tentacles drag Alice into the inferno. Like the previous trailer, it ends with a voice saying "What have you done?"

On February 14, 2011, MSNBC's "In-Game" website unveiled the third teaser trailer as well as a brief interview with American McGee regarding the game. The third teaser depicts Alice wandering around an initially beautiful Wonderland, eventually coming across the Caterpillar, who transforms into a giant, menacing butterfly as the landscape is attacked by fiery phoenixes and turned into a nightmarish world reminiscent of the original game's landscapes. Alice finds herself sitting at a tea party with the Mad Hatter, March Hare and Dormouse. The Hatter sends a robotic teapot to kill Alice, who in turns stabs it to death in the eye with the Vorpal Blade. Then, a voice asks "What have you done?" A fourth trailer, showing gameplay footage for the first time was released on March 4, 2011. The trailer featured possible gameplay in Victorian London, new costumes and weapons for Alice, the reprised roles of some of the voice cast from the first game, and the appearance of old and new characters including a resurrected Jabberwock and the Dodo; after the trailer the Cheshire Cat says "Now it's time to put your blade to work". The player can also hear Alice's Vorpal Blade being equipped as the title card comes up.

GameSpot released footage of a gameplay demo whilst interviewing an EA executive producer Joel Wade in April. In the video, numerous details about the game were revealed. Wade explained storywise after Alice left Rutledge Asylum, she is an orphan and now lives in an orphanage, and the home's director is helping her. Gameplay showed Alice can unlock and use several weapons, which can be upgraded by collecting teeth throughout the game. Weapons including the Vorpal Blade, the Pepper Grinder which acts as a projectile machine gun-like weapon, the Clockwork Bomb, the club-like Hobby Horse, and the explosive Teapot Cannon. Alice also collects "memories" that are part of her quest to recall forgotten memories from her past. Enemies are described as having "puzzle elements", namely their weak point which the player must figure out to defeat them. On May 20, 2011, a prequel to Madness Returns, titled Alice: Madness Returns Interactive Story, was released as an app exclusively for iOS. A port for Android phones was developed. The app plays like a book that requires you to interact with illustrations and at many times allows you to play mini-games. The story covers the events even before the original game all the way to the events directly before Alice: Madness Returns. On June 3, 2011, a final launch trailer was released. This showed some bosses, Alice fighting enemies, the Cheshire Cat giving Alice hints, and more. At the time of release, Madness Returns had a final development budget of $9 million. In 2013, American McGee admitted that he wished he had had more time to polish the game by compressing the action, removing a lot of the "filler" content and fixing some of the annoying bugs.

== Marketing ==
The soundtrack was released digitally for promotional purposes on 17 May 2011. Clothing was screen-printed and showcased through t-shirts. Action figurines of Alice, Card Guards and the Cheshire Cat were distributed by Diamond Select Toys, as of San-Diego Comic-Con 2011 there was an exclusive Minimate of Alice released.

Cover of The Art of Alice: Madness Returns

In 2011, Epic Weapons released both the Alice: Madness Returns Vorpal Blade and the Vorpal Blade mini set for kids. Along with the Vorpal blade, there was a packaged deal with the American McGee's Alice Vorpal Blade that came with the display stand, originally sold separately. A special edition replica, 'Alice: Madness Return Teapot' was sold by Epic Weapons as a fully functional teapot, based on the creature 'Eyepot' within the game. Mysterious, American McGee's fashion brand, created 'Chaos' symbol related accessories, including necklaces and wallets. The official artbook of Alice: Madness Returns "The Art of Alice: Madness Returns" written by R.J. Berg, was released on 17 May 2011, complete with concept ideas and character designs. Art prints are available through Mysterious and have been created over years by several different artists, also to be signed by American McGee when purchased. Merchandise from Alice: Madness Returns is still purchasable as of the 2020s via McGee's company Mysterious.

=== Alice: Otherlands ===
The artbook of Alice: Otherlands was released on 30 October 2015 along with several digital assets on Kickstarter for being unable to sell physical copies once the campaign had ended. The artbook is available through direct download and is accessible through the Internet Archive.

=== Alice: Asylum ===
In 2023, on Patreon and released to the public via YouTube, American McGee posted 5 tracks of 'Alice: Asylum Conceptual Music & Soundscape Experiments' which was arranged by Alex Crowley and used for narrative inspiration during pre-production. In the description of the video, McGee goes into further detail and explains the meaning behind each track. Since Alice: Asylum was not completed, McGee has allowed fans to download the full Alice: Asylum design bible of concepts, pitches and character designs for free on Patreon. Several designs for casual clothing were created but never came to fruition. Alice: Asylum embroidery patches of several characters became available through Mysterious.

== Reception ==
Reception

Aggregate scores
Aggregator	Score
GameRankings	(PC) 74% (X360) 73% (PS3) 71%
Metacritic	(PC) 75/100 (X360) 70/100 (PS3) 70/100

Review scores
Publication	Score
1Up.com	B−
Eurogamer	5/10
Famitsu	29/40
GameSpot	7/10
GameTrailers	7.2/10
IGN	6.5/10
X-Play	2/5

Aggregating review websites GameRankings and Metacritic gave the Windows version 74% based on 15 reviews and 75/100 based on 29 reviews, the Xbox 360 version 73% based on 49 reviews and 70/100 based on 67 reviews, and the PlayStation 3 version 71% based on 35 reviews and 70/100 based on 52 reviews.

Alice Liang from 1Up.com gave the game a B−, praising the platforming and controls but felt the game did not live up to its full potential, stating: "Sadly, Alice: Madness Returns provides a visually interesting world, with competent gameplay mechanics, but it ultimately fails to completely draw the player into the depths of its promised insanity to satisfaction."

GamesRadar+ included it in their list of the 100 most overlooked games of its generation. Editor Jason Fanelli felt that it was a worthy sequel yet also felt that players would have to overlook problems to enjoy its qualities.

=== Cultural Impact ===
The release of the game played into the resurgence of Alice's Adventures in Wonderland popularity of the late 2000s to the early 2010s, this was sparked further by the Tim Burton film Alice in Wonderland (2010). The first game: Alice focuses on the late 1990s grunge movement with its soundtrack and use of industrial visuals, whilst Alice: Madness Returns indulges onto its steampunk aesthetics opposed to the basis of goth subculture.

Steampunk is used as a key visual effect, this in turn changed various characters designs and fighting enemies became more complicated. This is in part to development periods and the years between the games releases. With mixed reviews over several years, Alice: Madness Returns, over time has stayed consistent as an 'underrated masterpiece' within internet culture since its initial release with a cult following. The legacy of Alice: Madness Returns proves to remain more popular than that of its predecessor and it continues to live on through social media platforms specifically that of TikTok and Twitch.

== Sequels ==
=== Alice: Otherlands ===
American McGee has stated that he had envisioned the Alice series as a trilogy. In May 2011, McGee reported that a story had already been created for a potential third game, but stressed that it would only be produced if the audience desired it. In June 2012, McGee reiterated his intention to develop a third game, titled Alice in Otherland. McGee revealed that the game would be released episodically, and stated that it "would allow Alice to go into the minds of all these characters she encounters, and it opens up the possibility where you could play as Alice and you can enter into a player's mind, change the landscape, and then basically psychologically adjust the character in doing so. Imagine an MMO where the missions aren't locations, but they're people." However, he said that the game was unlikely to be produced soon due to a lack of interest from Electronic Arts.

On March 14, 2013, McGee posted on his Facebook page that he would have the opportunity to discuss a third Alice game with EA during the Game Developers Conference. He did not specify whether or not this would follow the desired plot of Alice in Otherland, but claimed that the funding for the project would most possibly be done through Kickstarter. On July 15, 2013, McGee announced that a campaign for the production has begun on Kickstarter to help fund the project, titled Alice: Otherlands, a series of animated film shorts. To help promote the campaign, McGee released a video on his personal YouTube and Vimeo accounts, explaining the concept of Alice: Otherlands and how the funds will affect the production of the film. The video can also be viewed on its Kickstarter website.

Alice: Otherlands successfully reached its Kickstarter goal on August 4. On August 21, McGee confirmed that the campaign has achieved its "stretch goal" to secure Susie Brann's (Alice's voice actress) and Roger L. Jackson's (the Cheshire Cat's voice actor) involvement on the project with an extra $50,000. To award the backers who donated to the project, McGee gave special merchandises, such as autographed posters, digital copies of the DVD and art book to those who donated $500 or more. Additionally, all backers had their names added to the credits of the film. Due to legal constraints, DVDs and Blu-rays were available for backers only, while the short films were distributed digitally for the public for free on various digital formats. An art book titled The Art of Alice: Otherlands was developed by artist Alex "AlexCee" Crowley. Originally, Alice: Otherlands was set to be released sometime in December 2014, but has been pushed back due to production delays. On October 30, 2015, the digital assets for Alice: Otherlands were released on various streaming platforms, such as YouTube and Vimeo, and are available for download on the official site.

According to McGee, Alice, now 20 years old, will enter the minds of two famous historical figures, Richard Wagner and Jules Verne, and discover the horrors of the human subconscious. Alice will learn of an "insidious evil lurking in every corner of Victorian London" with the intent of capturing its inhabitants in a nightmarish "prison of the mind". The two film shorts vary in length, have their own unique animation style, and a different soundtrack composed by Chris Vrenna and Walter Sickert and the Army of Broken Toys. In several interviews, McGee expressed his desire to make Alice: Otherlands into a video game as originally planned, but stated that will depend entirely on the overall success of the animated shorts. He also stated that EA has recently started to show more interest in making an Alice sequel again, but it all depends on the success of Alice: Otherlands and Spicy Horse games.

=== Alice: Asylum ===
In September 2017, American McGee announced that he was working on a license proposal for the third installment of the Alice franchise, tentatively titled Alice: Asylum. McGee explains that his license proposal would consist of "artwork, design outline, and financial/business model" which has been sent to EA in July 2018. The pitch deck was being partially funded through the membership platform Patreon before being cancelled in April 2023 after Electronic Arts rejected the design bible pitch. Furthermore, McGee announced that he is no longer interested in pursuing future projects regarding the Alice franchise, even if EA were to reconsider their stance with production of the game.

=== Dreadfuland spin-off ===
In 2026, McGee announced that he is developing a "spiritual successor" to the Alice series called Dreadfuland, which is based on his Plushie Dreadfuls toy-line brand. Dreadfuland is confirmed to share the same universe as Alice and the narrative's beginning is linked to the ending of Madness Returns. McGee states that Dreadfuland will also provide "a certain level of closure" for himself and the fans of the Alice games series. Dreadfuland explores the emotional journey of 10-year-old "James", an orphaned boy "adopted" by the "dark, evil" Ashcroft family, using "Dreadfuland" (his Wonderland equivalent) to unlock his lost past. McGee shares various concept arts and behind-the-scenes works for Dreadfuland on his social media accounts since late December 2025.
