= Spicy Horse =

Defunct Chinese video game developer

- Type: Private
- Industry: Video games
- Founded: 2007
- Founder: American McGee; Anthony Jacobson; Adam Lang
- Defunct: 2016
- Headquarters: Shanghai, China
- Area served: Worldwide
- Key people: American McGee; Ken Wong; R. J. Berg
- Products: Alice: Madness Returns
- Number of employees: 6 (2016)
- Website: www.spicyhorse.com

Spicy Horse (simplified Chinese: 麻辣马; traditional Chinese: 麻辣馬; pinyin: Má là mǎ) was a Shanghai-based independent video game developer started by American McGee, Anthony Jacobson, and Adam Lang in 2007. It was announced on July 23, 2016, that the company was closing its doors to focus on smaller indie development. The studio is best known for Alice: Madness Returns, the sequel to American McGee's Alice.

== History ==
After shutting his then-company The Mauretania Import Export Company, American McGee flew to Asia to seek business opportunities. From there, he met a pool of talented people in China who had been working and outsourcing games for western developers for many years but did not have any creative control over the IPs. American saw this as a favourable circumstance and decided to form a company in Shanghai to not only provide job opportunities to local talents but to also offer a healthy work environment.

The studio was established in 2007. It was called a studio "leading the way" in episodic games. It was the largest independent Western developer in China.

Spicy Horse employed more than 70 people at their studio in Zhabei District, Shanghai. The company's development process utilized a "core team" methodology and 100% outsourced art asset production to conserve energy directed at the core competencies of game development.

Following rumors regarding the studio's closure, on March 29, 2016, McGee acknowledged that there had been some layoffs but they would continue to operate and would look to move away from F2P mobile games in the future.

In 2016, McGee announced the closure of Spicy Horse after 10 years of development. He plans to focus on indie development using Patreon and work on a different work environment like his sailboat.

== Products ==
Their first title, American McGee's Grimm, was released on GameTap in July 2008 in an episodic form and ran through March 2009. It was built using Epic's Unreal Engine 3.

Spicy Horse developed the sequel to American McGee's Alice for Electronic Arts, titled Alice: Madness Returns. It is the first console game entirely designed and developed in China for export.

Spicy Horse spawned a child company, Spicy Pony, for creating digital mobile media games for the iPhone. Their first title, DexIQ was released in early December 2009. Their second was a Little Red Riding Hood adaption for the iPad called Akaneiro. Their next project was to be an adaptation of The Wizard of Oz, OZombie, financed by a Kickstarter campaign. The campaign was cancelled on July 14, 2013, in order to focus on a series of Alice short films and due to lack of support for the OZombie project.

Title	Year	Platforms	Developer	Publisher	Notes
American McGee's Grimm	2008	Windows	Spicy Horse	GameTap	Episodic McGee takes on various Grimm tales.
DexIQ	2009	iPad, iPhone, iPod	Spicy Pony		Puzzle game
American McGee Presents Akaneiro	2010	iPad	Spicy Pony		Little Red Riding Hood in Japan
American McGee's Crooked House	2010	iPad, iPhone, iPod	Spicy Pony		Puzzle game
Alice: Madness Returns	2011	PlayStation 3, Xbox 360, Windows	Spicy Horse	Electronic Arts	Sequel to American McGee's Alice
BigHead Bash	2012	TBA	Spicy Horse	TBA	Side scrolling/battle multiplayer. (Unreleased)
Crazy Fairies	2012	Mobile, Facebook	Spicy Horse	TBA	Currently in the Closed Beta Stage. (Unreleased)
Akaneiro: Demon Hunters	2013	Browsers, Tegra-powered tablets	Spicy Horse	Spicy Horse	A Japanese/McGee take on Little Red Riding Hood.
