= Sexless Demons and Scars =

Studio album by Jack Off Jill
- Released: September 9, 1997
- Studio: Criteria Studios in Miami, Florida
- Length: 40:13
- Label: Risk
- Producer: Don Fleming

Jack Off Jill chronology
Sexless Demons and Scars (1997)	Covetous Creature (1998)

Professional ratings
Review scores
Source	Rating
AllMusic	2.5/5 stars
Drowned in Sound	8/10
Kerrang!	3/5 stars

Sexless Demons and Scars is the debut album by Jack Off Jill. At the time, the group consisted of Jessicka, Agent Moulder, Ho Ho Spade, and Lauracet Simpson. Original members Michelle Inhell and Tenni Ah-Cha-Cha left the band a few months prior to the recording.

As of February 2000, the album has sold 13,282 copies, according to Nielsen SoundScan.

== Track listing ==
All tracks are written by Jessicka Addams and Robin Moulder, except where noted.

Sexless Demons and Scars track listing
No.	Title	Writer(s)	Length
1.	"American Made"		3:17
2.	"Horrible"		2:32
3.	"My Cat"		3:06
4.	"Super Sadist"		1:47
5.	"Devil with the Black Dress On"	Addams, Moulder, Lauracet Simpson, Jeff Tucci	2:34
6.	"Girlscout"	Addams, Moulder, Simpson, Tucci	3:25
7.	"Swollen"		3:26
8.	"Poor Impulse Control"	Addams, Moulder, Simpson, Tucci	2:57
9.	"Lollirot"		2:29
10.	"Covet"	Addams, Moulder, Simpson, Tucci	3:02
11.	"Working with Meat"		2:03
12.	"Cumdumpster"		2:26
13.	"Everything's Brown"		3:42
99.	"Angels Fuck" (hidden track)	Addams, Moulder, Simpson, Tucci	3:27
Total length:			40:13

Note

- Tracks 14–98 are blank.

== Personnel ==
Credits are adapted from the album's liner notes.

Jack Off Jill

- Jessicka – vocals, cover artwork
- Robin "Agent" Moulder– bass, piano, cover artwork
- Ho Ho Spade – guitar
- Lauracet Simpson– drums

Additional musicians

- Marilyn Manson – guitar on "Swollen"

Production

- Don Fleming – production, mixing
- Bill Emmons – engineering
- Christoper Sphar – assistant engineer
- Doug Sax – mastering
