= Scott Putesky =

American guitarist (1968–2017)

Daisy Berkowitz
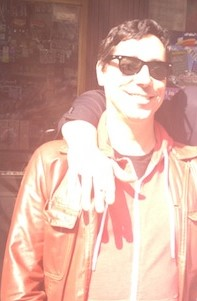
- Putesky in 2013

Background information
- Also known as: Daisy Berkowitz; SMP; Scott Mitchell
- Born: Scott Mitchell Putesky; April 28, 1968; Los Angeles, California, U.S.
- Died: October 22, 2017 (aged 49)
- Genres: Industrial rock; industrial metal; alternative metal; gothic rock; shock rock
- Occupation: Musician
- Instruments: Guitar; percussion; harmonica
- Years active: 1989–2017
- Formerly of: Marilyn Manson

Scott Mitchell Putesky (April 28, 1968 – October 22, 2017), also known by the stage name Daisy Berkowitz, was an American guitarist. He was a founding member of the rock band Marilyn Manson & the Spooky Kids (later shortened to just Marilyn Manson) and the band's guitarist until 1996. After leaving Marilyn Manson, Putesky was involved in a number of other projects such as Three Ton Gate, the Linda Blairs, Jack Off Jill, Stuck on Evil (previously called Rednecks on Drugs), Kill Miss Pretty, and the Daisy Kids.

== Biography ==
Scott Putesky was born in Los Angeles, California, and was adopted and raised in New Jersey. His family was Jewish, but he described himself as atheist. His first instruments were the flute and the snare drum, and in 6th grade he joined the school's chorus. He started playing the guitar when he was 15. His early loves were drawing, movies, and Star Wars.

=== Marilyn Manson ===
Putesky, an Art Institute of Fort Lauderdale graduate with a degree in advertising design, met future Marilyn Manson bandmate Brian Warner at a Fort Lauderdale club called The Reunion Room and later at a local after-party in December 1989. The two created the concept of Marilyn Manson & the Spooky Kids poking fun at American media hypocrisy and its obsessions with serial killers and beautiful women. For this act, he took the stage name Daisy Berkowitz, devised by mixing the names of The Dukes of Hazzard character Daisy Duke and serial killer David Berkowitz.

In 1996, creative differences with Manson caused Putesky to leave Trent Reznor's Nothing Studios in New Orleans before Antichrist Superstar was completed. Manson had begun to work more with the other members of the band, and the dark environment of Antichrist Superstar's production led to Berkowitz being muscled out of the group. He is, however, credited for writing the music for four songs on the record, among them being the album's second single, "Tourniquet". Due to unpaid royalties, Berkowitz filed a $15 million lawsuit against Manson, which was later settled under confidential terms.

=== Post-Marilyn Manson work ===
In late 1998, Putesky joined up with longtime Marilyn Manson collaborators Jack Off Jill, replacing departing member Ho Ho Spade and playing live guitar on their 1999 West Coast tour which lasted for only a handful of gigs. His first recorded work with the band was the 1998 EP Covetous Creature, to which he lent guitar and some production.

By early 1999, SMP was no longer a member of Jack Off Jill. Putesky himself was vague, but he related to MTV News that the parting was amicable. He returned once again to Fort Lauderdale, Florida to resume work on his own music, primarily seeking a live band to perform his Three Ton Gate material. In the meantime, he successfully sued Marilyn Manson for what he claimed were unpaid royalties for his contributions to Antichrist Superstar. In the same lawsuit, Putesky was awarded the rights to 21 unreleased recordings by Marilyn Manson & the Spooky Kids.

Putesky revived Three Ton Gate shortly afterward to play live under that name in a 2011 series of dates across America starting in New York City on October 15.

== Death ==
In September 2013, Putesky was diagnosed with stage-four colon cancer. He died in Boca Raton, Florida on October 22, 2017, aged 49.

== Discography ==
Marilyn Manson (and the Spooky Kids)

- The Raw Boned Psalms (1990)
- The Beaver Meat Cleaver Beat (1990)
- Big Black Bus (1990)
- Grist-o-Line (1990)
- Lunchbox (1991)
- After School Special (1991)
- Live as Hell (1992)
- The Family Jams (1992)
- Refrigerator (1993)

Marilyn Manson

- Portrait of an American Family (1994)
- Smells Like Children (1995)
- Antichrist Superstar (1996)
- Lunch Boxes & Choklit Cows (2004)
- Lest We Forget: The Best Of (2004)

Three Ton Gate

- Vanishing Century (1997)
- Rumspringa (2002)
- Lose Your Mind (2003)

Jack Off Jill

- Covetous Creature (1998)

Stuck on Evil

- Suntanic (2001)

Daisy Berkowitz

- Millenium Effluvium (2014)

Justin Symbol

- VΩIDHEAD (2014)

The Daisy Kids

- Mr Conrad Samsung (2015)

Guest appearances

- 2000 Years of Human Error (Godhead, 2001)
- The Chrome Recordings (TCR, 2004)
- Judy Garland (Kill Miss Pretty, 2010)
