= Jeff Antebi =

American entrepreneur in the arts

- Born: March 30, 1970 (age 56)
- Genres: Electronic; Hip Hop
- Occupations: Music Executive, Photojournalist
- Years active: 1996–present
- Label: Waxploitation

Jeff Antebi (born 1970) is an American entrepreneur in the arts, best known as the founder of Waxploitation Records and for his photographic works from war and conflict zones.

== Waxploitation Records ==
Jeff Antebi is the founder of Waxploitation Records, a company where he developed the careers of Grammy Award winning artists including Gnarls Barkley, Danger Mouse and the Grammy nominated artist Broken Bells as well as projects like Dangerdoom with Adult Swim, Dark Night of the Soul (album) with David Lynch, The Grey Album and ROME with Danger Mouse, Jack White and Norah Jones.

Antebi developed Danger Mouse's producing career from 2003 to 2010, a period of time which includes albums by Gorillaz, The Black Keys, The Good, the Bad & the Queen, and Beck.

Antebi produced the Causes 1 and Causes 2 album series to benefit the work of Oxfam, Human Rights Watch and Médecins Sans Frontières. The albums include songs from Diplo, Spoon, LCD Soundsystem, Animal Collective, The Shins, Devendra Banhart, The Decemberists, and Death Cab for Cutie among others.

== Photojournalism ==
His work as war/crisis/conflict photojournalist has appeared in/been featured by CNN, Current TV, GOOD Magazine, NPR, PBS NewsHour, and Rolling Stone among others. He was the first photographer ever exhibited by London’s StolenSpace gallery (Shepard Fairey, D*Face, Will Barras).

Antebi’s debut Los Angeles exhibition, Haiti Before 1.12.10, was curated by Los Angeles County Museum of Art’s Edward Robinson, LACMA’s Curator of Photography. His photograph "Haiti on Fire” was used for the cover of the Summer 2010 issue of The Paris Review.

Antebi's debut book Fever Dreams focused on his works about war and elections in Afghanistan, the Drug Cartel Wars in Ciudad Juarez, life in Brazil's notorious illegal squatter "favelas", crisis and elections in Haiti and Thailand’s bloody Malay insurgency.
