= American McGee's Grimm =

- Developer: Spicy Horse
- Publisher: GameTap
- Designer: American McGee
- Writer: R. J. Berg
- Engine: Unreal Engine 3
- Platform: Windows
- Release: July 31, 2008 – April 24, 2009
- Genre: Action-adventure
- Mode: Single-player

American McGee's Grimm is a 23-part episodic video game series based upon Grimm's Fairy Tales, designed by American McGee, developed by Spicy Horse and distributed online initially by GameTap starting July 31, 2008. Grimm was originally thought to resemble the warped fairy tale style of American McGee's Alice, but the art style appears to be much more child-friendly and simplistic. Grimm is written and executive-produced by the same person as American McGee's Alice, R. J. Berg. The original announcement was made in the June 2007 issue of PC Gamer.

Spicy Horse Games is using Unreal Engine 3 technology for American McGee's Grimm.

There are 23 weekly episodes, divided into three seasons of eight or seven episodes each. Each episode offers approximately a half an hour of gameplay, although different playing styles (either for "complete conversion" or "speed-runs") make for different times. The game has been referred to as "highly accessible" and American McGee has commented that the game experience shares a similarity with Katamari Damacy.

A five-issue comic book mini-series based on the game began in April 2009. Published by IDW Publishing, the book was written by Dwight L. MacPherson with art by Grant Bond.

== Gameplay ==
In American McGee's Grimm, the player controls Grimm, a dwarf who creates a trail of darkness wherever he goes. The premise is that Grimm has become sick of how "saccharine sweet" fairy tales have become, and has made it his goal to revert lighthearted fairy tales to their darker, original versions by running and jumping through fantasy worlds, making things darker as he passes by them, using a downward move (called a "butt-stomp") to increase the distance his dark powers reach. By converting enough objects, Grimm can increase the level of his Dark-O-Meter (a bar that shows the effect of Grimm's powers), increasing the power and radius of his dark aura, as well as his running and jumping abilities. Certain characters complicate this process by attempting to clean the areas Grimm has converted, but these enemies can be stopped once Grimm's Dark-O-Meter reaches a high enough level. Of course, Grimm does more than simply "restore" classic tales to their original unedited versions: he practically reduces many to dark parodies, the original message of the story obliterated, ironically making Grimm little different from those who "gutted" the stories of their darker tones to begin with.

== Distribution ==
Following the traditional television distribution model, every episode of Grimm is available free for 24 hours on the day of release. After that, episodes are available for purchase on multiple distribution channels and also to GameTap Gold (paid) subscribers. There are currently three volumes of Grimm slated for release with Volume 1 launched on July 31, Volume 2 fall 2008, and Volume 3 early 2009. In a recent interview with GameSpot, McGee said that he would like to put this game on Xbox Live and may release it in retail form.

=== Episodes ===
==== Season 1 ====
1. "A Boy Learns What Fear Is" (July 31)
  When a young boy goes on a quest to find the true meaning of fear, his trek takes a turn for the darker when Grimm appears to muck things up! Traverse on a quest for fear through the boy's hometown, the gallows, a local school, a graveyard and a haunted castle... and that's the uplifting part of the story! Happily ever after ends now!
2. "Little Red Riding Hood" (August 7)
  Red Riding hood's mother calls her into the house. "Your grandmother is very ill," she says, "So I've baked strawberry tarts for her and packed some jam. Take this basket and go straight to her cottage!" But when Grimm is thrown into the mix, someone's not coming out alive! Follow this classic story through a town in the woods, the local crossroads, Granny's place, the insides of the Big Bad Wolf and the Woodsman's Den. Keep your eyes peeled, or the wolf's gonna get ya!
3. "The Fisherman and His Wife" (August 14)
  A poor fisherman hooks a magic fish, but his wife continues to want more and more... and more! Things can only get worse when Grimm comes for a visit! Help the fisherman as he journeys through his hovel on the shoreside, the local port, his wife's new digs, the local sailor town, his wife's church and a raging whirlpool on the coastline! Hope you know how to swim... because Grimm doesn't!
4. "Puss in Boots" (August 21)
  The youngest of a miller's sons is forced to eat his feline inheritance to keep back a night of hunger... until the cat crafts a plan to save both their lives. But when Grimm enters, one question is left uncertain: is the cat helping others, or is he just helping himself? Enjoy the ride through the miller's town, a rabbit's den, the king's castle, a bandit's ambush, the local fields and an ogre's castle! Better be careful; never know when Puss is gonna strike!
5. "The Girl Without Hands" (August 28)
  A father maims his own daughter in exchange for vast wealth and ends up walking away without any guilt. When Grimm shows up, however, pappy's gonna pay, big time! Assist the girl without hands as she journeys through the local logger's den, her father's windmill station, the castle garden, the castle gates, a battlefield, the local wilderness and a return trip to dad's windmills! There hasn't been a nastier definition of "tough love"... until now!
6. "Godfather Death" (September 4)
  When a family gets a 13th child, the father makes Death kiddie #13's godfather. Grimm, however, has a dark fate in store for this boy... one that ends pretty badly! Join Death, kiddie 13 and his dad in their trek through the family's farm, God's church, the Devil's home for nuns, Death's "immortality plant" farm, the local castle and hell! See you in the afterlife!
7. "The Devil and His Three Golden Hairs" (September 11)
  When a Luck Child is born, the local king tries to kill him by sending him on a quest to steal three hairs from the Devil's head. But when Grimm shows up, the king ends up in an explosive situation! Help out the Luck Child as he treks along the local river town he calls home, a thieves' den, a town of beer-lovers, a town of the well-fed, Charon the ferryman's river, the Devil's domain (along with several parts of his body), the king's castle and a rough and rowdy downstream river! Don't let the ferryman trick you!
8. "Beauty and the Beast" (September 18)
  If you thought this story was all songs and dance, you're looking in the wrong place! Assist Beauty (and her family) with her Beast as she goes through her water-locked hometown, a frozen forest, an enchanted castle, a rich town, Beauty's dream world, and a wedding that was crashed by pirates... Wait a second! That's not part of the story! Ah, well; what can you do when Grimm's in town?

==== Season 2 ====
9. "The Master Thief" (October 30)
  When a Master Thief returns home rich and famous, he must face off against his godfather, the Count! Things can only go downhill as this story is rewritten into a monster movie by "Director Grimm"! Help the Master Thief get his loot as he slips through his old home town, the Count's castle, the Count's stables, the Count's personal graveyard/backyard, the village churchyard and the town square. Be wary of vampires, the undead and werewolves; oh, my!
10. "The Singing Bone" (November 6)
  When two brothers are sent by the king to save their town from a monster boar and the older brother takes the credit for the kill (along with his little brother's life) away, only to walk away Scot free (until his brother's remains sing the secret that was so long hidden), Grimm decides some serious revisions are in order! Join the younger brother in life (and undeath) as he treks through a small farm, the fields ravaged by the boar, the local castle front yard, the boar's forest, a local pub, the shores on which the good brother died and the king's castle. May you enjoy his skull's little tune!
11. "King Midas" (November 13)
  In this story, a king of Greece wishes to have the touch of gold. But when he gets a chance to renew his greed and ends up with no punishment, it's time for an extreme makeover: Grimm edition! Follow King Midas throughout the Greek plains, the Muses' music court, Midas' kingdom, the local barber's place, Midas' backyard, the town port, the river Patoclames, Hades and the city of Olympus. Remember, kiddies: Wishes always backfire!
12. "Cinderella" (November 20)
  This timeless story tells of the struggles of the young girl, Cinderella, as she strives for her "happily ever after". However, Grimm feels that something needs to change when Mrs. Angry Stepmother and the Evil Stepsisters don't get what's coming to them! Dance the night away with Cinderella through her old village, the town graveyard, Cinderella's new home, her new town, the new town graveyard, the prince's castle and Cinderella's wedding (complete with explosive cake!). Yet another disturbing work, in the style a la Grimm!
13. "The Golden Goose" (November 27)
  When the youngest of three brothers earns a goose of pure gold for being nice to a stranger, he ends up with more rewards than he first thought! Time for Doctor Grimm to "cure" this epidemic! Follow the youngest brother's quest as he heads through his small hut, the local woods, the nearby town, the castle's wine cellar, Mount Bread and the ship that sails on land and sea! May your voyage be merry aboard the S.S. Grimm!
14. "Iron John" (December 4)
  When a young, disobedient prince recklessly puts several lives in danger by releasing a sadistic, metal monster of a man named Iron John (for the sake of a toy) and gets rewarded, Grimm decides it's time this story got set to "Terminator" mode! Follow Iron John and Prince Connor as they journey through the local town, Iron John's pond hideout, Prince Connor's massive castle abode, Iron John's "Midas pool", a kingdom that neighbors Prince Connor's, the old king's tournament, and Prince Connor's wedding. Side with Iron John if you want to live!
15. "The Pied Piper" (December 11)
  When the town of Hamelin is saved by a mysterious Piper, but the townspeople don't thank him and he doesn't do much as revenge towards them, Grimm decides to crank the plague up a notch or two! Join the Pied Piper as he wanders through the outskirts of Hamelin, Hamelin's town square, the local docks, the riverfront, the Family Celebration Day festival, and the Piper's mountain hideout. Better pay the Piper; you've put up quite a bill!
16. "A Christmas Carol" (December 18)
  In this special season finale, we wrap up the season with a twist on a holiday classic. If you thought Ebenezer Scrooge was bad, wait till you see what Grimm does with the story!

==== Season 3 ====
17. "The Frog King" (February 12)
18. "Jack and the Beanstalk" (February 19)
19. "Mulan" (February 26) - This episode is spoken entirely in Mandarin Chinese
20. "Pinocchio" (March 5)
21. "Sleeping Beauty" (also including "Rapunzel" and "Rumpelstiltskin") (March 12)
22. "The Adventures of Thumbling" (April 16)
23. "Snow White" (April 23)
  Mirror, mirror, on the wall, this is the Grimm-est of them all! The finale of season 3, and Grimm overall, brings us to one of the most beloved fairy tales...to make it vile. This tale of a young girl rushed out by her evil stepmother is given a high boost of extra darkness! Explore the Queen's Mirror chamber, the castle gardens, and the Dwarves Cottage. Then, to make the royal wedding a smash, Grimm will rally his friends from other tales to have fun!

== Reception ==
The first season of Grimm was met with mild praise. As of March 2009, the average rating of the first season is 6.77 out of ten, according to GameTap users.

IGN rated the episodes as follows:

1. "A Boy Learns What Fear Is": 6/10
2. "Little Red Riding Hood": 6.1/10
3. "The Fisherman and His Wife": 6.2/10
4. "Puss in Boots": 6.1/10
5. "The Girl Without Hands": 5.7/10
6. "Godfather Death": 6.3/10
7. "The Devil and His Three Golden Hairs": 6.2/10
8. "Beauty and the Beast": 6.3/10

Season one had an average IGN score of 6.1.

As of March 2009, the second season had an average of 6.7 out of ten, according to GameTap users.
