= Rogue Entertainment =

American video game developer

- Type: Private
- Industry: Video games
- Founded: 1994
- Defunct: 2001
- Successor: Nerve Software
- Headquarters: Dallas, Texas, US
- Products: Strife; American McGee's Alice
- Website: rogue-ent.com (archived)

Rogue Entertainment was an American computer game developer based in Dallas, Texas, that was active in the late 1990s. It was founded by Rich Fleider, Steve Maines, and Jim Molinets in 1994. Rogue Entertainment's office was in the same building as id Software, all of their games used game engines created by id Software, and two of their games were expansions for id Software's Quake series of games. The company's first game, Strife: Quest for the Sigil, was released as shareware on February 23, 1996, with the retail version later being released on May 31, 1996. Many former Rogue Entertainment employees moved to Nerve Software after Rogue Entertainment shut down.

== Games developed by Rogue Entertainment ==
- Strife (1996) (PC)
- Quake Mission Pack No. 2: Dissolution of Eternity (1997) (PC)
- Quake II Mission Pack: Ground Zero (1998) (PC)
- Quake II (1999) (Nintendo 64)
- American McGee's Alice (2000) (PC)
- Counter-Strike: Condition Zero (never published, development passed back to Valve, later to Gearbox Software)
