= Pitch book =

Type of marketing presentation

A pitch book, also called a confidential information memorandum, is a marketing presentation (information layout) used by investment banks, entrepreneurs, corporate finance firms, business brokers and other M&A intermediaries advising on the sale or disposal of the shares or assets of a business. It consists of a careful arrangement and analysis of the investment considerations of the client business and is presented to investors and potential investors with the intent of providing them the information necessary for them to make a decision to buy or invest in the client business.

== Overview ==
There are many contributors to an intermediary's pitch book. In an investment bank contributors may include anyone from an analyst to an associate, a vice-president or even the managing director. See Financial analyst § Investment banking.

Key areas covered in a typical pitch book include information on the investment highlights, key financial figures, the company's core customers and diversification of the customer base, barriers to entry for competitors, ability and plan to achieve future projections, future growth opportunities, strength of management team, scalability of operations, opportunities in the external market place and known risks, not to mention disclaimers. As an example, a table of contents or outline will open the pitch book for discussion. Name, title, and department present a management description of the deal team and other contributors within the firm's internal wealth of resources. An "overview", "financing requirements" (such as satisfying Capex and capital budgeting), and finally as mentioned a description of the company's universe, the "comparable company analysis" are all essential elements to an investment banking pitch book.

The pitch book may employ a SWOT analysis (Strengths, Weaknesses, Opportunities, and Threats). "Comps", or Comparable Company Analysis may also be presented. In a comp, an investment bank presents industry specific details, trends, macro- and microeconomic and company specific analyses, which support reasoning for a particular valuation. (Comp has an alternate meaning: It's used as code for "comparative price" or the multiple of earnings at which similar businesses have sold.)

Full-service investment banking conglomerates, a.k.a. Bulge Bracket banks, compete to win the business of established clients as either the lead or co-manager of a syndicate. If a firm is less established, the firm, and not the investment bank, tends to make the pitch to secure the relationship. (See Regulation D of the United States Securities Act of 1933.) The pitch book is also used by investment banks to market themselves to potential clients. It provides the bank with a chance to show and prove why the client should instruct them instead of any competitor.

The pitch book is not to be confused with a public information book ("PIB"), which is an internal resource for the investment bankers to glean transactional and historic information on a particular company. There are several types of pitch books, from general pitch books providing an overview of a firm to pitch books designed to best present the firm to potential service partners or, in M&A, to investors.
