= Waxploitation Records =

Waxploitation
- Founded: 1996
- Founder: Jeff Antebi
- Status: Active
- Genre: Electronic; Hip Hop; Indie; Latin Music
- Country of origin: United States of America
- Official website: www.waxploitation.com

Waxploitation is an American record label, artist management company and music publisher, which was founded in 1996 by Jeff Antebi.

The company is best known for developing the careers of artists including Gnarls Barkley, Broken Bells, and Danger Mouse as well as projects like Danger Doom with MF Doom, Rome with Jack White and Norah Jones, and Dark Night of the Soul with David Lynch and Sparklehorse.

Waxploitation managed Danger Mouse's producing career from 2004 to 2010, an era during which he produced albums by The Black Keys, Beck, and Gorillaz, as well as the infamous Grey Album.

In addition to creative ventures, Waxploitation has a longstanding commitment to philanthropy including their ongoing Causes album series which has included songs from The Shins, LCD Soundsystem, Diplo, Death Cab for Cutie, Bloc Party, Devendra Banhart, The Decemberists, Sharon Jones & Dap Kings among many more.

In 2017, Waxploitation published the book entitled Stories for Ways & Means featuring original collaborations with Tom Waits, Nick Cave, Frank Black, Justin Vernon, Laura Marling, Devendra Banhart, Amadou Bagayoko, Gary Numan, Kathleen Hanna, and more.

== Associated artists ==
- Danger Mouse
- Danger Mouse and Sparklehorse
- Broken Bells
- Danger Mouse and Daniele Luppi – Rome (2011)
- Gnarls Barkley
- Danger Doom
- The Grey Album
- La Yegros
- Black Moth Super Rainbow
- Teargas & Plateglass
- Tha Alkaholiks
- Tweaker
- R.L. Boyce
