= Tweaker (band) =

American band

- Origin: Los Angeles, California, United States
- Genres: Electronic; industrial rock; alternative rock; gothic rock; progressive rock
- Years active: Late 1990s–present
- Labels: Metropolis, Six Degrees
- Members: Chris Vrenna; Clint Walsh

Tweaker is an American band founded by Chris Vrenna in the late 1990s. Tweaker's musical style incorporates synthpop, progressive rock, modern jazz and electronica genres, and is characterized by a generally melancholy and somber sound with matching artwork.

== History ==
The album The Attraction to All Things Uncertain was Vrenna's "solo" debut and it was not until the follow-up album, 2 a.m. Wakeup Call, that Clint Walsh was announced as a permanent fixture to the band. While Vrenna and Walsh supply most instruments and electronics, many other musicians contributed to Tweaker's performances and recordings, including Robert Smith, David Sylvian, Burton C. Bell, Craig Wedren, Will Oldham, Hamilton Leithauser, Buzz Osborne, Jonathan Bates and Johnny Marr. The subsequent albums followed a preset central theme.

Tweaker wrote and performed the theme music to Doom 3, of which the theme song was released via the band's website. The rest of the soundtrack is accessible from the game's files. Tweaker also composed the theme music for the animated television show Xiaolin Showdown. Unlike the band's usual synthpop, shoegaze, modern jazz, dark ambient and industrial sound, the Doom 3 theme was mainly heavy metal.

In 2004, Tweaker opened for Skinny Puppy on select dates with a full live band, consisting of Chris Vrenna (drums, percussion and keyboard), Clint Walsh (guitar and keyboard), William Faith (bass guitar) and Nick Young (vocals). They performed everything live (i.e., no pre-recorded tape), although they did have to alter some of their songs to fit the live format — the most extreme case being a completely revamped rock version of "Microsize Boy". The final performance on the tour was at QuakeCon 2005 in Dallas, TX.

== Official members ==
- Chris Vrenna
- Clint Walsh

== Discography ==
=== Studio albums ===
- The Attraction to All Things Uncertain (September 18, 2001)
- 2 a.m. Wakeup Call (April 20, 2004)
- Call the Time Eternity (October 23, 2012)

=== Remix albums ===
- And Then There's Nothing (November 26, 2013)

=== EPs ===
- Linoleum (August 21, 2001)

=== Singles ===
- Linoleum (2001)
- Xiaolin Showdown (2003)
- The Steel Box (2019)
