= Scarling discography =

Scarling. discography
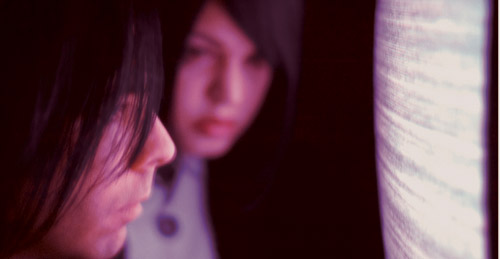
- Studio albums: 2
- EPs: 2
- Singles: 5
- Music videos: 1
- Other appearances: 3
- Cover songs: 4

The discography of the American noise pop band Scarling (usually stylized as Scarling.) consists of two studio albums, two extended plays, and five singles.

== Studio albums ==
List of studio albums
Title	Album details
Sweet Heart Dealer	Released: February 17, 2004; Label: Sympathy for the Record Industry; Format: CD, LP
So Long, Scarecrow	Released: October 25, 2005; Label: Sympathy for the Record Industry; Format: CD, LP

== Extended plays ==
List of extended plays
Title	Album details
Band Aid Covers the Bullet Hole	Released: December 16, 2003; Label: Sympathy for the Record Industry; Format: CD
Staring to the Sun	Released: June 6, 2006; Label: Sympathy for the Record Industry; Format: CD

== Singles ==
Song	Year	Album
"Band Aid Covers the Bullet Hole"	2003	Sweet Heart Dealer
"Crispin Glover"	2004	Sweet Heart Dealer
"We Are the Music Makers" (split w/ The Willowz)	2006	So Long, Scarecrow
"Staring to the Sun"	2006	So Long, Scarecrow
"Who Wants to Die for Art?"	2013	non-album single

== Other appearances ==
Song	Year	Album	Ref(s).
"Band Aid Covers the Bullet Hole"	2003	Blisscent II	
"City Noise"	2006	Alright This Time Just The Girls Vol. 2	
"Daisy Bell"	2014	Mark Ryden's The Gay Nineties Olde Tyme Music	

== Cover songs ==
- "Creep" by Radiohead
- "Wave of Mutilation" by Pixies
- "I Started a Joke" by the Bee Gees
- "Daisy Bell" by Harry Dacre

== Music videos ==
Title	Year	Director	Album
"Daisy Bell"	2014	Mark Ryden	Mark Ryden's The Gay Nineties Olde Tyme Music
