= Who Wants to Die for Art? =

2013 single by Scarling

- Jessicka artwork variant

Single by Scarling.
- B-side: "I Started a Joke."
- Released: October 29, 2013
- Recorded: 2013
- Studio: Committee HQ, Los Angeles, California
- Genre: Noise pop; shoegaze
- Length: 4:09
- Label: The Committee to Keep Music Evil
- Producers: Rob Campanella; Kirk Hellie; Scarling.

Scarling. singles chronology
| "Staring to the Sun" (2006) | "Who Wants to Die for Art?" (2013) |

"Who Wants to Die for Art?" is the fifth and final single from American noise pop band Scarling. It was released on October 29, 2013 through The Committee to Keep Music Evil, and was available as a 7" single from the band's online store for a limited amount of time. It is also Jessicka's final musical release before her retirement from music in 2021.

== Background ==
"Who Wants to Die for Art?" was the band's first new release of music in over seven years, after Jessicka took a hiatus from making music to focus on her art career. The single was released on October 29, 2013, through the Committee to Keep Music Evil (CTKME), an independent label based in Los Angeles. The single's B-side, "I Started a Joke", is a downbeat Bee Gees cover.

"Who Wants to Die for Art?" was scheduled to appear on the Scarling's planned third studio album, but shortly after the single's release, Jessicka became sick from an undiagnosed disease. After recovering from her sickness and participating in a reunion tour with her other band Jack Off Jill in 2015, Jessicka said that Scarling was planning to release a new album in the future through CTKME, though ultimately, the album was never released. Jessicka announced her retirement from the music industry in February 2021, making "Who Wants to Die for Art?" the band's final release.

== Artworks ==
Three covers were designed for "Who Wants to Die for Art?". The first cover, which is featured on streaming services, is a painting by Jessicka. The other covers were painted by Camille Rose Garcia and Marion Peck. Jessicka, Peck and Garcia all presented their artworks for the "Who Wants to Die for Art?" single as part of a four-woman show in Los Angeles called "Black Moon", alongside Elizabeth McGrath, on November 3, 2013.

== Track listing ==
| No. | Title | Writer(s) | Length |
|---|---|---|---|
| 1. | "Who Wants to Die for Art?" | Scarling. | 4:09 |
| 2. | "I Started a Joke." (Bee Gees cover) | Barry, Robin, and Maurice Gibb | 3:59 |
| Total length: | | | 8:00 |
