= Jessicka (singer) =

American musician and artist

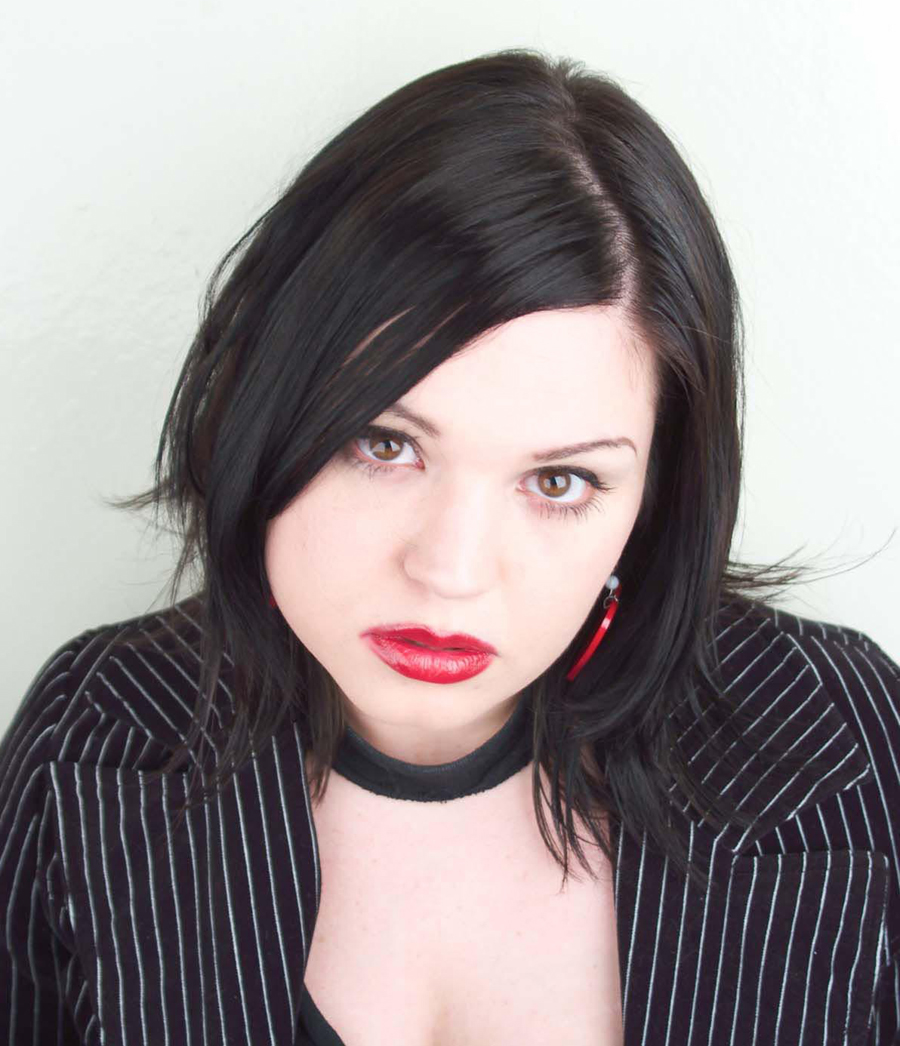
- Jessicka in 2004

Background information
- Also known as: Jessicka; Jessicka Addams
- Born: Jessica Fodera; October 23, 1975 (age 51); Miami, Florida, U.S.
- Origin: Fort Lauderdale, Florida
- Genres: Alternative rock; goth rock; riot grrrl; noise pop
- Occupations: Singer; visual artist; writer
- Years active: 1992–2023
- Formerly of: Jack Off Jill; Scarling.
- Website: www.jessicka.com

Jessicka Addams (born Jessica Fodera on October 23, 1975) is an American visual artist and musician. Best known by her stage name Jessicka, she was the frontwoman for the alternative rock band Jack Off Jill, and later for the noise pop band Scarling.

== Early life ==
Jessicka grew up in the town of Sunrise, Florida. She was raised as an only child by her mother Nancy after her mother divorced her husband, Joseph. After high school, Jessicka immersed herself in music, the Goth subculture, gay iconography, John Waters, and feminist literature. At 15, she decided to start her own band and began writing lyrics that would later appear on early Jack Off Jill demos.

== Music career ==
=== Jack Off Jill (1992–2000) ===
Jessica Fodera met Tenni Arslanyan while attending high school in Sunrise, Florida. She added the "K" to the original spelling of her first name and dropped her surname, paying homage to Magick Book 4, by Aleister Crowley. The two began writing songs, and were joined by Robin Moulder and Michelle Oliver to create the band Jack In Jill. In 1992, Jack In Jill got their start when they were asked to open for Marilyn Manson and his band, Marilyn Manson and the Spooky Kids at a Davie, Florida nightclub called The Plus 5 Lounge. Manson suggested a name change to Jack Off Jill (JOJ). In 1993, JOJ released their first recording titled, "Children 5 And Up", produced by Marilyn Manson. In early 1993, Jessicka performed with Manson's ephemeral side project, Mrs. Scabtree, and shared vocal duties with her then-boyfriend Jeordie White.

The band used an aesthetic inspired by riot grrrl, which Jessicka coined 'Riot Goth' in 1993, defined as being dark, morbid, angry, melancholic, creepy and cute. Their songs addressed serious issues such as rape, domestic abuse, self-harm, body shaming, depression, patriarchy, and female empowerment.

In December 1994, while on tour in Jacksonville, Florida, Jessicka and Manson were arrested after a concert for breaking the town's adult entertainment codes. They both spent one night in jail. Charges were dropped.

By 1995, the band’s record label, Rectum Records, had released several independent JOJ records and 7" singles. Jack Off Jill signed with Los Angeles-based Risk Records in January 1997. The band released their first full-length album, Sexless Demons and Scars, in September 1997, then toured in the U.S. and Canada. In July 2000, JOJ released their second full-length CD, Clear Hearts, Grey Flowers, just as the label was preparing to close down.

JOJ officially went on hiatus in late 2000, after playing a show at Los Angeles' The Troubadour in April 2000. They were joined onstage by guitarist Helen Storer of the UK band Fluffy and producer Chris Vrenna on drums.

=== Scarling (2002–2014) ===
After taking a break from the music industry and moving to Los Angeles, Jessicka was invited in 2001 by guitarist Christian Hejnal to be a guest vocalist on his solo album. The pair had met a few months earlier through a mutual friend. They began recording and rehearsing together and eventually recruited the musicians who would form the first and very short-lived lineup of Scarling. In early 2002, Jessicka was introduced to record label owner Long Gone John by mutual friend Mark Ryden. In March 2003, Scarling.'s debut single "Band Aid Covers the Bullet Hole" was released through Sympathy for the Record Industry. The cover featured an illustration entitled "Wound 39" by artist Mark Ryden. In April 2004, Scarling. released their first album, Sweet Heart Dealer, which again utilized the team of Ryden and Vrenna.

In the autumn of 2004, Jessicka was featured on the cover of ROCKRGRL's vocalist issue. Scarling. was invited to join the lineup of the Robert Smith-curated Curiosa Festival, performing on select West Coast dates alongside Jessicka's long-time favorite band The Cure. Three weeks before joining the tour, drummer Samantha Maloney filled in and was soon replaced by Beth Gordon.

Smith described the band's music as "dark, desperate, chaotic, gorgeous pop music, the sound of the end of the world". Scarling.'s Sweet Heart Dealer was nominated for the 2004 Shortlist Music Prize.

After a series of 7" singles on Sympathy, Scarling. announced in early 2005 that their second album, So Long, Scarecrow, would release later that year; it was preceded by the single "We are the Music Makers" and released in August 2005. So Long, Scarecrow was co-produced by Rob Campanella and received several favorable reviews. Alternative Press' Jason Pettigrew gave the album a 5 out of 5 rating. Simon Price from The Independent said, "Fodera has always had a knack for acronyms and catchphrases, 'Manorexic' is one which will be lapped up by the goth kids, but her intriguing lyrics, sung in a voice pitched midway between Kate Bush sweetness and Siouxsie Sioux stridency, cut deeper than mere punning." The song Bummer was featured on Showtime's The L Word season 3 episode "Latecomer". In December 2005, Scarling. embarked on its first UK tour. In 2006 Jessicka continued to tour in the US and Europe, with Scarling. opening for The Wedding Present and Depeche Mode and touring alongside UK shoegaze band Amusement Parks on Fire. In 2006, Scarling. released their fourth single Staring to the Sun. The album cover featured a portrait of Jessicka done by Los Angeles photographer Piper Ferguson.

On May 13, 2014, Mark Ryden released an album entitled 'The Gay Nineties Old Tyme Music: Daisy Bell,' that featured Scarling. and more than a dozen other artists all performing their own renditions of the song 'Daisy Bell (Bicycle Built for Two).' The album, printed on 180 g red vinyl, was limited to 999 copies, all hand-numbered and signed by Ryden. Half of the records were to be sold at the Michael Kohn Gallery. The proceeds from the record will benefit Little Kids Rock, a nonprofit that supports musical education in disadvantaged elementary schools.

=== Jack Off Jill reunion shows (2015) ===
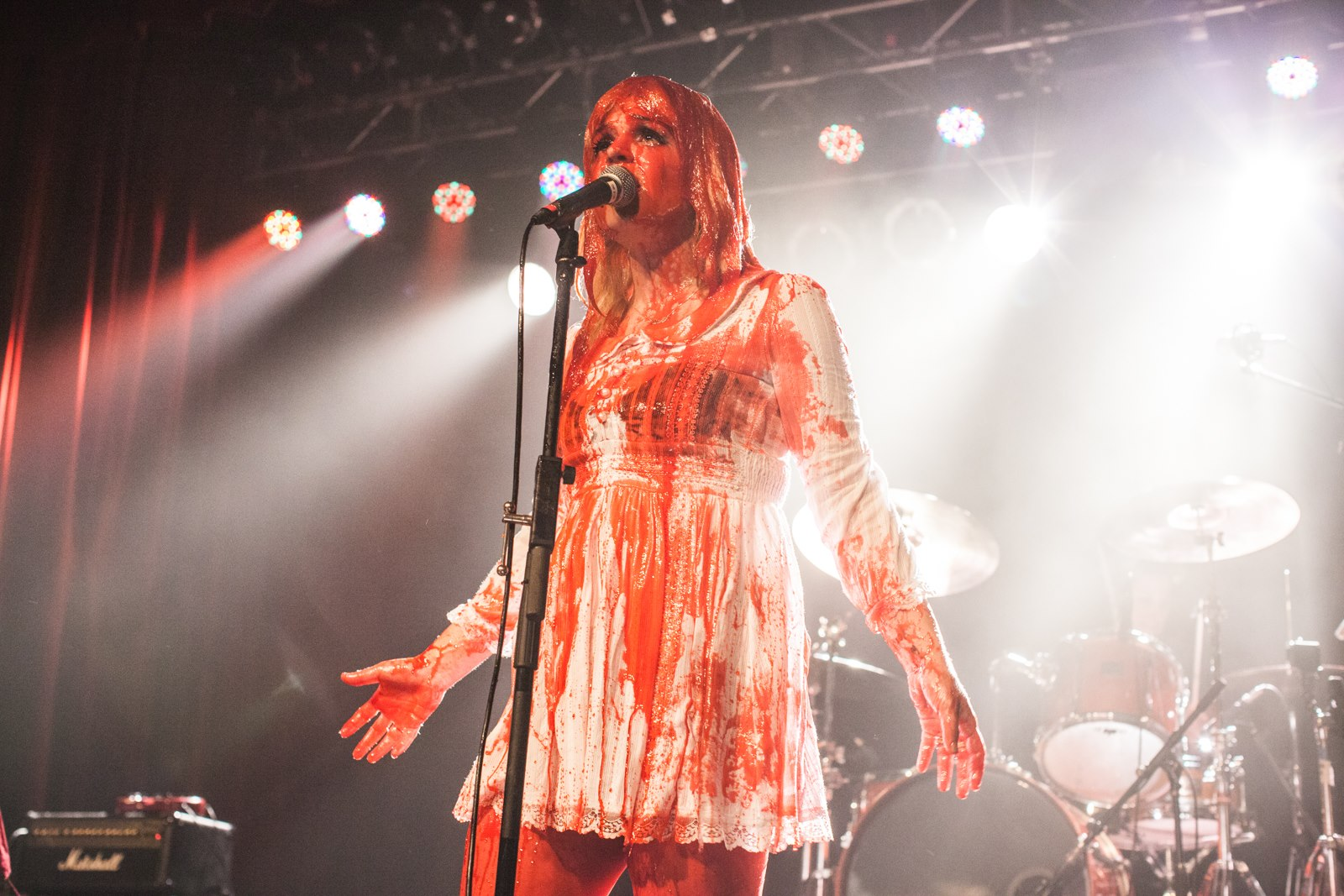
Jessicka in 2015 at Jack Off Jill 's reunion show

On April 7, 2015, Bust.com announced a Jack Off Jill reunion show at The Orange Peel in Asheville, North Carolina on July 18, as well as a Pledgemusic campaign offering "Golden Tickets" and other Jack Off Jill rarities related to the show. The 2015 lineup consisted of Jessicka, Tenni Ah-Cha-Cha, Michelle Inhell and Helen Storer. During the band's reunion, Jack Off Jill was described by several publications as "Riot Goth Legends" and "Cult Heroes". Jessicka stated that their show at Heaven in London on October 23, 2015 (her birthday) would be Jack Off Jill's final show.

On February 2, 2021, Jessicka announced on Twitter that she was no longer a part of the music industry, stating that she was now "finding other ways to release my negative emotions while trying to be kinder to myself."

== Between bands ==
After JOJ Jessicka worked with Kevin Haskins and producer Chris Vrenna on American McGee's Alice soundtrack. She also made a cameo appearance in the 2001 film Ellie Parker.

In March 2009, Jessicka appeared as a special guest in an episode of the reality television series Germany's Next Topmodel, hosted by Heidi Klum. In April 2009, Jessicka modeled for photographer Austin Young for the Bettie Page Heaven Bound art show.

Jessicka and her husband Christian performed with their band Scarling. at the wedding of Bravo's Shear Genius finalist Janine Jarman and Matthew Wolcott at the Houdini Mansion in Hollywood on June 26, 2010.

Jessicka and Christian were featured on an episode of Interior Therapy with Jeff Lewis which aired August 20, 2013.

On March 10, 2014, Jessicka made a small cameo in Placebo's "Begin the End" video, directed by Los Angeles photographer Piper Ferguson.

In 2021, Addams began volunteering for PAVE (Promoting Awareness | Victim Empowerment) a national nonprofit that works both to prevent sexual assault and heal survivors through social advocacy, prevention education, and survivor support.

On April 30, 2023, Jessicka was asked to speak at PAVE's Shatter the Silence Concert and Variety Show. The event was held in Los Angeles, to honor survivors of sexual assault and their allies. Addams was presented with an award for her service for helping and inspiring survivors of sexual violence.

== Writing ==
Addams contributed interview quotes to 2009's Girls Against Girls: Why We Are Mean to Each Other and How We Can Change, written by Bonnie Burton. The book discusses the issue of bullying and abuse between girls, including its causes and advice on how to cope. The book draws upon experiences and interviews with Go-Gos guitarist Jane Wiedlin, writer and actress Mary Jo Pehl, tattoo artist Hannah Aitchison, Tegan Quin of the band Tegan and Sara, and artist Elizabeth McGrath.

On July 22, 2014, Jessicka wrote an essay titled "Coming Full Circle with Fat Phobia, Anne Wilson, & Self Hatred" that was published online in Bust. It discusses the singers' experiences with being overweight in the music industry.

In 2016, with the help of author Carrie Jo Tucker, Jessicka organized, contributed to, and self published a zine called “After Grrrl” (Small Stories From Big Lives). The zine included stories from many influential female artists, icons, and taste makers including Allison Wolfe, Lori Barbero, Camille Rose Garcia, Kelly Osbourne, Bonnie Burton and Remy Holwick as well as many others.

== Art ==
Who Wants to Die for Art?, 2013 for "Black Moon"

On April 25, 2008, at the World of Wonder Storefront Gallery in Los Angeles, California, Addams was in her first group artshow curated by actor Daniel Franzese called depARTed.

A mystical cat-like design by artist Jessicka Addams was created in 2008, the pentacat has become an icon on merchandise like stickers, socks, apparel, and art, representing a blend of feline charm and gothic/pagan aesthetics.

On November 13, 2010, she presented her artwork collectively entitled 'Smile Even if it Hurts' at the Dark Dark Science Gallery (Atwater Village, California) in a joint exhibit with friend and fellow artist Lindsey Way. Adams' show was titled "What's Behind the Bunny" and featured collaborations with artists Mark Ryden, Elizabeth McGrath, Morgan Slade, Louis-Marie de Castelbajac, Joshua Petker, Tarina Tarantino, Jared Gold, Austin Young, and Janine Jarman. On April 1, 2011, her website JessickaAddams.com launched featuring a gallery of her artwork.

On April 9, 2011, Addams participated in Tara McPherson's "Tiny Trifecta" in Williamsburg, Brooklyn, New York, and LeBasse Projects inaugural exhibition "Momentum" in Chinatown, Los Angeles, California.

On August 5, 2011, Addams' show "Little Grey Secrets" opened at La Luz de Jesus gallery in Los Angeles.

Addams is listed in several art publications as one of artist Mark Ryden's muses. On November 2, 2013, she was part of a four-woman show in Los Angeles called "Black Moon", with fellow female artists Elizabeth McGrath, Camille Rose Garcia and Marion Peck.

In January 2014, Addams was featured in the LA Art Show. Huffington Post's Bruce Helander wrote, "Jessicka Addams, who could be related to the real Addams Family and creates self-portraits that reference near death personal experiences with a witty, macabre slant."

=== Curator ===
Addams has curated two different art shows under the name Dark Dark Science. The first was a joint exhibit with friend and fellow artist Lindsey Way on November 13, 2010, collectively entitled 'Smile Even if it Hurts'. The second show ran from August 4 to August 28, 2012, and was titled 'MiXTAPE'. Artists were asked to pick a song and create art inspired by that song. 24 artists participated in the show including Mark Ryden, Frances Bean Cobain, Camille Rose Garcia, Fairuza Balk, Aaron Smith, and Tara McPherson. The eclectic mix of songs chosen were featured for digital download on iTunes.

== Personal life ==
Addams is bisexual. On February 14, 2006, while on a break from touring, she and Scarling colleague Christian Hejnal got engaged. Their wedding took place on October 13, 2007, at the Oviatt Penthouse in Los Angeles, and was attended by numerous celebrities. The couple changed their surname to Addams.

On October 20, 2017, Addams wrote a Facebook post accusing her ex-boyfriend Twiggy Ramirez, bassist of Marilyn Manson, of raping her while they were a couple in the 1990s; she also accused him of subjecting her to domestic violence and emotional abuse. On October 24, 2017, Marilyn Manson tweeted on Twitter that the band had parted ways with Ramirez following allegations of sexual misconduct made against him, and announced that there would be a replacement for the upcoming tour. Ramirez issued a statement following the allegations: "I have only recently been made aware of these allegations from over 20 years ago. I do not condone non-consensual sex of any kind. I will be taking some time to spend with my family and focus on maintaining my several years of sobriety. If I have caused anyone pain I apologize and truly regret it."

== Exhibitions ==
- 2025 “Weird Like Clouds” TBA
- 2016 "Please Stop Loving Me" / "Shitty Teen" with Lindsey Way February 5–28, 2016 at La Luz de Jesus, Los Angeles, CA
- 2014 "That Which Does Not Kill You" May 9 to June 8, 2014" The Cotton Candy Machine, Brooklyn, NYC
- 2011 "Little Grey Secrets" La Luz de Jesus Los Angeles, CA
- 2010 "Smile Even If It Hurts" at Dark Dark Science Gallery, Los Angeles, CA

Selected group shows

- 2020/2021 Our Vision. Our Voices. Sloan Fine Art virtual
- 2020 Gold Bug Gallery, Love 20/20 Pasadena, CA
- 2018 ‘Hecate’ / Mab Graves, Miss Van. Red Truck Gallery New Orleans, LA
- 2018 LAST GASP group show MINNA GALLERY San Francisco
- 2018 LA Art Show "Littletopia" Los Angeles, CA
- 2017 "Friends with the Animals: And Other Tales in an Anthropomorphised World". Curated by Luke Chueh G R2 gallery, Santa Monica, California
- 2016 Damien Echols - "Collaborations". Copro Gallery Santa Monica California
- 2016 "Crime On Canvas" Las Vegas, Nevada
- 2016 "My Blood Runs Yellow: A Tribute to Giallos" curated by Alix Sloan and Drew Fitzpatrick Los Angeles, California
- 2016 "Arcana" at Red Truck Gallery, New Orleans, Louisiana
- 2015 "Dreamlands" Corey Helford Gallery, Culver City, CA
- 2015 LA Art Show "Littletopia" Los Angeles, CA
- 2014 "Black Moon NYC" Sloan Fine Arts, NY with Camille Rose Garcia, Elizabeth McGrath and Marion Peck
- 2014 "Boxes of Death 5"
- 2014 "Small Indignities" September 13 – October 5 at Red Truck Gallery, New Orleans, Louisiana
- 2014 "Flannel and Glitter" opened September 13 The Rawk Show, Romani Gallery, Austin, Texas
- 2014 "The Coaster Show" September 5–28, 2014 La Luz de Jesus, Los Angeles, CA
- 2014 "Fourth Annual Tiny Trifecta" at Cotton Candy Machine, Brooklyn, NY
- 2014 LA Art Show "Littletopia" Los Angeles, CA
- 2013 "Black Moon" Sloan Fine Arts, LA, CA with Camille Rose Garcia, Elizabeth McGrath and Marion Peck.
- 2013 "beer-is-art " Coaster Show at La Luz de Jesus, Los Angeles, CA
- 2013 "Third Annual Tiny Trifecta" at Cotton Candy Machine, Brooklyn, NY
- 2013 "Tentacles!" Ltd. Art Gallery in Seattle, Washington.
- 2013 " Mark Ryden's YHWH Group Custom Show" @ Toy Art Gallery Los Angeles, CA
- 2012 "Awakening" curated by Sloan Fine Arts, AFA gallery New York, NY
- 2012 "MiXTAPE" at Dark Dark Science Gallery, Los Angeles, CA
- 2012 "Second Annual Tiny Trifecta" at Cotton Candy Machine, Brooklyn, NY
- 2012 "Hey Geek Girl" LTD art Gallery Seattle, Washington
- 2011 "Spread the Word" Mark Moore Gallery, Culver City, CA
- 2011 "Plus 1" Sloan Fine Arts, New York, NY
- 2011 "Momentum" at LeBasse Projects Chinatown Inaugural Exhibition, Los Angeles, CA
- 2011 "Tiny Trifecta" at Cotton Candy Machine, Brooklyn, NY
- 2011 "Everything But The Kitschen Sync 14" at La Luz de Jesus, Los Angeles, CA
- 2009 "Crusaders and Haters" RoyalT, Culver City, California
- 2008 "2008 "DepARTed" World of Wonder Storefront Gallery, Los Angeles, CA

== Discography ==
=== Guest contributions ===
- "Last Day in June" (1999), for the band Honey to Ash
- "Miss Ann Thrope" (2000), track seven on My Ruin studio album, A Prayer Under Pressure of Violent Anguish, Snapper/Spitfire
- "Make You Believe" (2000), for the band Messy
- "Iieee" (2001), cover duet with Meegs Rascón, guitarist of Coal Chamber, for Songs of a Goddess – A Tori Amos Tribute
- "Happy for You" (2008), for The Ingenues
- "Nothing at All" (2012) Chris Vrenna / Tweaker "call the time eternity" Metropolis Records
- "Begin the End" Placebo (cameo) directed by Piper Ferguson
- "Mark Ryden's Gay Nineties' Album (2014) with Scarling

=== Soundtracks ===
- Wicked "When I Am Queen" & "Rabbiteen" (1998)
- Soundtrack, American McGee's Alice (2001)

== Filmography ==
- Ellie Parker (2005)
- Bettie Page Reveals All (2012) (documentary)
