= Christian Hejnal =

American musician and visual effects producer

- Also known as: Christian Hejnal Addams
- Born: June 3, 1969 (age 57); Berwyn, Illinois, U.S.
- Genres: Indie rock experimental rock Alternative rock Shoegazing
- Occupations: Musician, producer
- Instruments: Guitar, bass
- Years active: 1989–present
- Label: Sympathy for the Record Industry
- Website: scarling.com

Christian Hejnal Addams (born June 3, 1969) is an American visual effects producer known for the Spider-Verse animated films and is the producer, guitarist and occasional vocalist of the Los Angeles-based rock band Scarling.

== Musical career ==
In the early 1990s, he played in bands such as Candyhateful (previously known as the Brats) and The Drummed. Candyhateful's song "Stay Down" was featured in the 2000 film adaptation of Anne Rice's "Queen of the Damned", In 2001 Hejnal began work on a solo album. He invited singer Jessicka, whom he had met some months before at a Los Angeles club through mutual friend Lisa Leveridge, to perform vocals on a track he had written; they began recording and rehearsing together and eventually recruited the musicians who would form Scarling. in 2002.

In the autumn of 2004, after releasing their first album Sweet Heart Dealer, Scarling. was invited to join the lineup of the Robert Smith-curated Curiosa Festival, performing on select West Coast dates alongside Interpol, The Rapture, Mogwai, and he and Jessicka's long-time favorite, The Cure. Smith described the band's music as "dark, desperate, chaotic, gorgeous pop music, the sound of the end of the world" and Sweet Heart Dealer was nominated for the 2004 Shortlist Music Prize.

After a series of 7-inch singles on Sympathy, Scarling. announced in early 2005 that their second album, So Long, Scarecrow, would appear later that year; it was preceded by the single "We Are The Music Makers" and was released on August 23, 2005. Scarecrow was co-produced by Rob Campanella and received several favorable reviews. Alternative Press gave the album a 5 out of 5 rating and described Hejnal as a, "guitar physicist who holds court over these atmospheric rockers' second album, approximating everything from space-station climates to sperm whales rollin' on E, all while delivering solid songs." In 2006 Hejnal continued to tour in the US and Europe with Scarling. Along the way, touring with such bands as UK shoegaze outfit Amusement Parks on Fire and opening for The Wedding Present and Depeche Mode. Scarling. are currently working on their new album.

== Film career ==
In addition to his work with Scarling, since 1999, Hejnal has worked for Sony Pictures Imageworks, starting out as a production assistant on The Ninth Gate and Hollow Man. In 2000 he became a visual effects coordinator on the film Charlie's Angels, and completed work as the visual effects plate coordinator on Spider-Man, and as a Digital Production Manager for the films Spider-Man 2, Darkness Falls and The Prize Winner of Defiance, Ohio which stars Julianne Moore and Woody Harrelson. Currently, he is working as a digital effects film producer and is credited as such on the films Grandma's Boy, the Adam Sandler film Click, Spider-Man 3, Hancock. Tim Burton's Alice in Wonderland, 2011's The Green Hornet, Here Comes the Boom, Oz the Great and Powerful, 22 Jump Street, Pixels and Ghostbusters. Christian was the co- producer for Spider-Man: Into the Spider-Verse. The film was critically well received. Spider-Man: Into the Spider-Verse won Best Animated Feature Film at the 76th Golden Globe Awards, it won the same award at the 24th Critics' Choice Awards, and won the Best Animated Feature at the 91st Academy Awards, among several other awards and nominations. It was the first non-Disney or Pixar film to win the Oscar for Best Animated Feature since Rango (2011), becoming the 6th non-Disney/Pixar film to win this award.

Christian won a Visual Effects Society award for 'Outstanding Visual Effects' in an Animated Feature Motion Picture: 2018, Spider-Man: Into the Spider-Verse.

Critics at New York Magazine listed it at 9 on their list of the best films of the decade.

In July 2022, Christian was one of the digital effects producers for The Sea Beast for Netflix. On Metacritic, the film has a weighted average score of 74 out of 100 based on 20 critics, indicating favorable reviews. The following month, Hejnal rejoined the crew as an executive digital producer of Beyond the Spider-Verse set to be released in 2023.

At the 22nd Visual Effects Society Awards, held in 2024, Spider-Man: Across the Spider-Verse emerged as one of the top winners, receiving four awards, including “Outstanding Visual Effects” in an Animated Feature. The award was accepted by members of the visual effects team, including Christian Hejnal and collaborators, recognizing their achievement in advancing animated visual effects.

Christian Hejnal is slated to return as a producer in Spider-Man: Beyond the Spider-Verse, which is scheduled to be released in the United States on June 18, 2027.

== Personal life ==
On February 14, 2006, (Valentine's Day) while on a break from touring, he and Jessicka were engaged. Their wedding took place on October 13, 2007, at the Oviatt Penthouse in Los Angeles and was attended by numerous celebrities. The couple took Addams as their new surname.

== Discography ==
=== Albums ===
- Scarling., Sweet Heart Dealer (2004) – writer, guitar, bass, vocals
- Scarling., So Long, Scarecrow (2005) – writer, producer, guitar, vocals

=== Singles and EPs ===
- Scarling., "Band Aid Covers the Bullet Hole" (7-inch, Sympathy for the Record Industry 2003) – writer, vocals
- Scarling., "Band Aid Covers the Bullet Hole" (CD, Sympathy for the Record Industry, 2003) – guitar, vocals
- Scarling., "Crispin Glover" (7-inch, Sympathy for the Record Industry, 2004) – guitar, vocals
- Scarling., "Crispin Glover" (7-inch, Sympathy for the Record Industry, 2004) – guitar, vocals
- Scarling., "Scarling. / The Willowz" (split 7-inch, Sympathy for the Record Industry, 2005) – guitar, vocals
- Scarling., "Staring to the Sun" (CD, Sympathy for the Record Industry 2006 – guitar, vocals, producer
