= Long Gone John =

American entrepreneur

- Born: John Mermis; 1950 or 1951 (age 74–75)
- Occupation: Businessman

John Mermis (born 1950 or 1951), known as Long Gone John, is an American entrepreneur best known for his record label, Sympathy for the Record Industry, and his vinyl toy company, Necessaries Toy Foundation. He lived in Long Beach, California, for 30 years, but relocated to Olympia, Washington, in 2007.

== History ==
John's passion for rock and roll began when he was five years old and discovered radio. When his friends The Lazy Cowgirls couldn't find a label for their live album, John volunteered to put out the record himself. After he thought of the name for the label he started doing a series of 7-inch singles. Before he knew it, Sympathy for the Record Industry was a real label, one in which the proprietor's personality was very much ingrained. A tone of irreverence was immediately set by the label's moniker, by its Margaret Keane-style, sad-eyed waif logo, and by its motto: "We almost really care." By 2006 he had released the recordings of over 550 bands from all over the world.

Some of John's celebrity Sympathy alumni are Courtney Love and her band Hole, The White Stripes, and The Donnas' first incarnation, The Electrocutes. Some of John's less famous but yet still very notable Sympathy acts over the years have been Buck, Billy Childish, Dwarves, The Gun Club, The (International) Noise Conspiracy, Inger Lorre, Man or Astro-man?, April March, Motel Shootout, The Muffs, The Mumps, The Pooh Sticks, The Red Aunts, Redd Kross, Rocket from the Crypt, Scarling., Suicide, Jack Off Jill, Turbonegro and The Von Bondies.

Sympathy Records continues to be one of the more successful indie labels in the US. Many releases also involve commissioned artwork from well-known artists such as Mark Ryden, Todd Schorr, Chris "Coop" Cooper and Robert Williams, often involving subversive riffs on other famous works, like the album cover of The Rolling Stones' Their Satanic Majesties Request.

Along the way, John has compulsively amassed a vast collection of art and pop ephemera. After seeing an inferior version of the character Enid from Daniel Clowes' Ghost World comic, John was motivated to enter the collectible toy game. His new company, Necessaries Toy Foundation, started in 2003. It allowed John to finally slow down his label in order to work and focus on manufacturing a line of toys and publishing art-related books.

The documentary film The Treasures of Long Gone John was released in 2006. The film chronicles John's eccentric art and musical obsessions. It also explores the work of some of the artists he collects and collaborates with, including Todd Schorr, Mark Ryden, Marion Peck, Camille Rose Garcia and Robert Williams. It features a wall-to-wall soundtrack of over 40 Sympathy artists, original animation and time-lapse photography.
