= Janine Jarman =

American hairstylist, salon owner, and tv personality

- Born: April 17, 1981 (age 44)
- Occupation(s): Hairstylist, salon owner, television personality
- Known for: Shear Genius

Janine Jarman (born April 17, 1981) is an American hairstylist, salon owner, and American television personality. Her participation as a contestant on the television show Shear Genius led her to style several famous clients including Fergie, Scarlett Johansson and Christina Applegate. She served as the go-to stylist for Carmen Electra and the girl group The Pussycat Dolls. She owns the Hairroin salon in Hollywood, California.

== Career ==
In 2009, Janine joined the Sebastian Professional Design Team and now represents the brand on the West Coast. Janine owns Hairroin Salon in Los Angeles. On November 13, 2010, Jarman participated in a joint exhibit with friends and fellow artists Jessicka and Lindsey Way at the Dark Dark Science Gallery in Atwater Village, California.

== Television ==
Jarman was introduced to American audiences when she became a contestant in the Bravo reality show Shear Genius Season 3. She was a front-runner in the competition, but she was eliminated in the last challenge. Brig Van Osten, the dark horse, beat out Matthew Morris and Janine Jarman to win Season 3. Janine Jarman placed second and was awarded fan favorite.

== Personal life ==
On June 26, 2010, Jarman wed sales executive Matthew Wolcott at the Houdini Mansion in Hollywood. Jarman received some style help from fellow former Shear Genius finalist Matthew Morris, sporting a Priscilla Presley-inspired hairdo for the ceremony and a June Carter-inspired pony tail for the reception. After the 30-minute ceremony, the 250 guests including JC Chasez and Kevin Martin (American musician) of Candlebox watched Miss Derringer and Scarling. perform live at the reception.
