= Band Aid Covers the Bullet Hole =

2002 single by Scarling

- Original album artwork by Mark Ryden

Single by Scarling.

from the album Sweet Heart Dealer
- Released: March 19, 2003 (7"); December 16, 2003 (CD)
- Recorded: 2002
- Studio: June 3rd Studios and Amethyst Studios, California
- Genre: Noise pop
- Length: 9:53
- Label: Sympathy for the Record Industry; SFTRI 716 (7"); SFTRI 716 (CD)
- Songwriter(s): Jessicka
- Producer(s): Chris Vrenna

Scarling. singles chronology
"Band Aid Covers the Bullet Hole" (2003)	"Crispin Glover" (2004)

"Band Aid Covers the Bullet Hole" is a single by Los Angeles, California rock band Scarling. It was released in the USA on 7" vinyl on March 19, 2003, on the Sympathy for the Record Industry label, and on compact disc on December 16.

The lyric "Say hello to my little friend" on the chorus of the title track "Band Aid Covers the Bullet Hole" is a line from the film Scarface.

Band Aid Covers the Bullet Hole (the song) has two different versions and the one released on this single has a one word change. "Robots steal emotions", later changed to "Robots steal narcotics" for the album Sweet Heart Dealer.

The CD features an additional track, a cover of Radiohead's "Creep".

On March 12, 2006, an episode of the medical drama Grey's Anatomy titled "Band-Aid Covers the Bullet Hole" was aired.

== Track listing ==
1. "Band Aid Covers the Bullet Hole" – 3:32
2. "H/C" – 2:29
3. "Creep" – 3:52 (CD single only)

== Personnel ==
- Jessicka – vocals
- Christian Hejnal – guitar, vocals, bass
- Rickey Lime – guitar
- Garey Snider – drums
- Chris Vrenna – producer
- Erik Colvin – mixing
- Mark Ryden – cover artwork
