= Best Intentions =

Best Intentions may refer to:

- The Best Intentions, 1992 Swedish film
- Best Intentions (album), by American rock band We Are the In Crowd 2011
- "Best Intentions" (Knots Landing), a 1982 television episode
- "Best Intentions", Russell Hitchcock from self-titled album 1988
- "Best Intentions", The Tyde from Twice
- "Best Intentions", Robbie Williams from The Heavy Entertainment Show 2016
- "Best Intentions" (Les Bonnes Intentions), 2018 French film by Gilles Legrand
