= Sophe Lux =

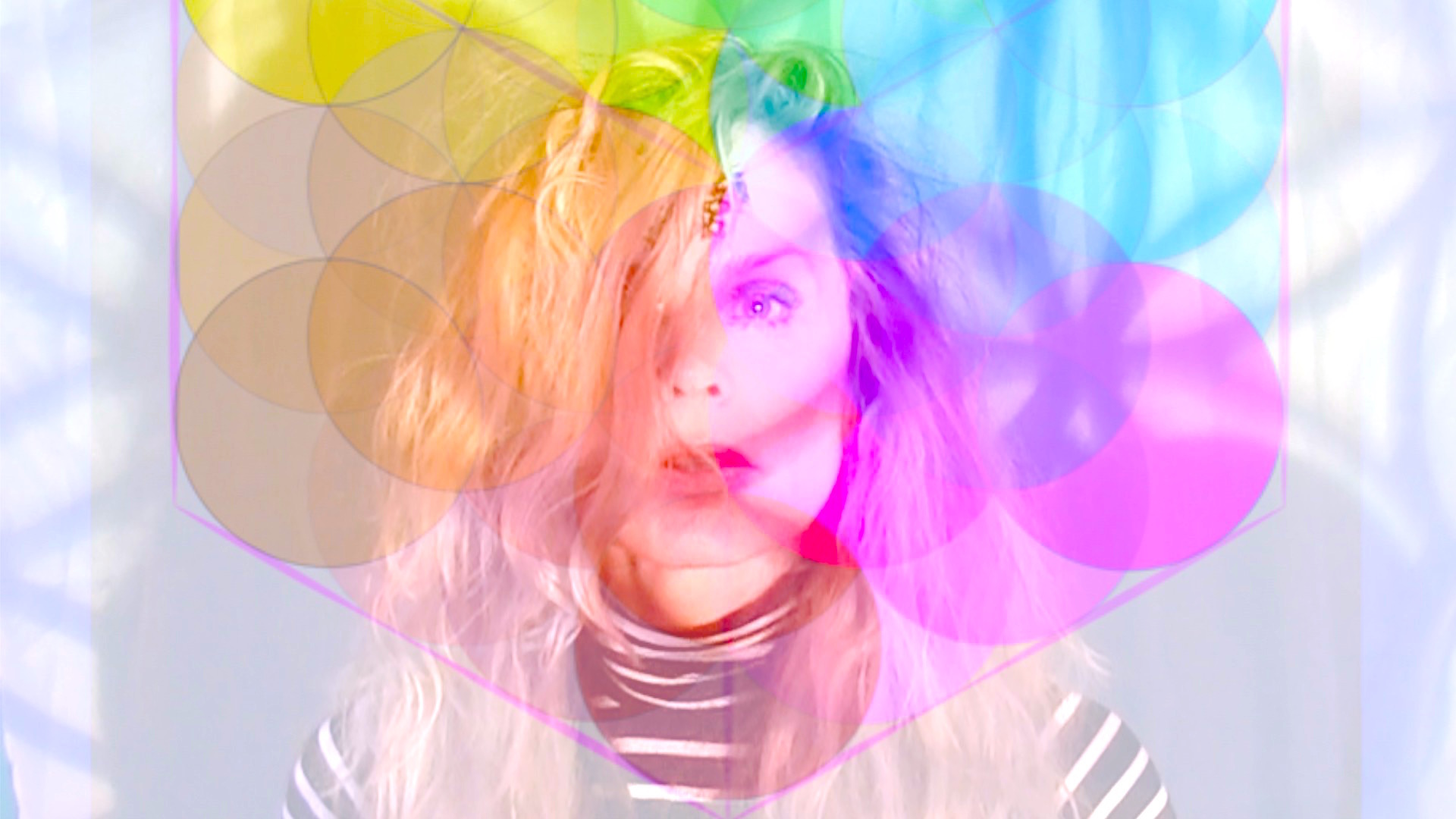

Background information
- Also known as: Sophe Lux & The Mystic
- Origin: Portland, Oregon
- Genres: Indie pop, baroque pop, chamber pop, art rock
- Years active: 2002–present
- Label: Zarathustra Records
- Members: Gwynneth Haynes
- Past members: Scott Appleman; Larry Crane (Jackpot! Records); Kelly Goodwin; Jeff Grazier; Erika Miller; Kent Sisson; Brianna Ratterman; Ken Yates; Twayn Willams; Paul Anderson; Kent Sisson

Sophe Lux & The Mystic is an American art rock band notable for its theatrical performances and its blending of electronica with operatic and chamber pop elements. The band has released four albums: All Are One (2016), Hungry Ghost (2009), Waking the Mystics (2007), and Plastic Apple (2002).

== History ==
Sophe Lux was formed in 2002 in Portland, Oregon. It began as a vehicle for singer-songwriter Gwynneth Haynes, the younger sister of film director Todd Haynes (Velvet Goldmine, I'm Not There, Far From Heaven). The art rock band began incorporating elements of indie, baroque, and chamber pop.

=== Plastic Apple (2002) ===
The band's debut album, Plastic Apple was produced and engineered by Larry Crane, who had previously worked with American groups Elliott Smith, Sleater-Kinney, Cat Power, and Sonic Youth, at Jackpot Records in Portland. Larry Crane played as a multi instrumentalist on the album, with John Mowen (The Decemberists, Steve Malkmus & the Jicks) on drums, and Mike Clark (Steve Malkmus & The Jicks) on keys. Plastic Apple was mastered by Jeff Saltzman (Death Cab for Cutie).

The album was released on Haynes' record label Zarthustra Records in 2002. It explores themes of love and tragedy and features a song dedicated to Nietzsche, one of Haynes' noted muses. With references to Nietzsche, Wagner, and Lord Byron, critics dubbed Haynes the girl singer-songwriter for the brainy set. Reviewers of the album referenced Haynes' musical style with comparisons to Cat Power, PJ Harvey, and Tori Amos.

The track "Void of Course" also appeared on CW network TV show It's a Beautiful Life.

=== Waking the Mystics (2007) ===
The second full length Sophe Lux album, Waking The Mystics featured more theatrical vocals with operatic pop and electronic art rock influences. The album was recorded entirely at The Type Foundry in Portland, OR engineered by Adam Seltzer of M. Ward and The Decemberists. The track "Marie Antoinette Robot" was mixed by Brian Vibberts (David Byrne and Paul McCartney).

The album features Gwynneth Haynes on lead vocals, guitar, and keys, Twayn Williams on guitars, Scott Appleman on Drums, Kelly Goodwin on keys, and Erika Miller on bass. The album was produced primarily by Haynes with the support of Williams, Appleman, Goodwin, and Miller. Choral arrangements for the rock opera inspired song "Marie Antoinette Robot" were written by Camelia Nine.

Waking the Mystics was released on the Zarathustra Records label in 2007. The cover for the album, "Mr. Bunny" is by pop surrealist Marion Peck. The album explores themes hypnosis and consumerism, and has a song dedicated to Nietzsche's muse Lou Salome.

Reception

The album was well received with Haynes' songs being compared to the likes of Kate Bush, Queen, The Decemberists, and David Bowie.

The track "Electra 33" appeared on CW promos for TV show The Vampire Diaries, and the track "Target Market" appeared on Starz Network TV show Gravity. The video for the song "Target Market" was shown at MIDEM in Cannes, France in 2010.

=== Hungry Ghost (2009) ===
The third Sophe Lux release Hungry Ghost (2009), features theatrical art-rock and experimental styles inspired by Brian Eno, David Byrne, Laurie Anderson, and Kate Bush. The album features Gwynneth Haynes on keys and lead vocals, Kent Sisson on drums, Jeff Grazier on bass, Ken Yates on guitars, and Brianna Ratterman on keys. It was recorded and produced by Sean Flora (The Shins) at The Magic Closet and Jackpot! in Portland. The album was again mixed by Jeff Saltzman. This album's art rock sensibilities gained comparisons to Queen, Kate Bush, Peter Gabriel, and Roxy Music.

=== All Are One (2016) ===
All Are One is an art rock album released August 19, 2016 by Gwynneth Haynes under the moniker Sophe Lux & The Mystic. Haynes wrote the songs, sang the vocals, played keys, synths, drum loops, and made string arrangements. Additional musical support was offered by the album's engineer Larry Crane (Elliott Smith, Cat Power, Sleater Kinney, Pavement, and The Decemberists). Crane contributed bass, guitars, and drum loops. Additional credits include: Paul Pulvirenti (Elliott Smith) on drums and Dan Lowinger for guitar on two tracks. The album was recorded at Jackpot! Recording Studio in Portland, OR. The album was mastered by Garrett Haines at Treelady Studios in Pittsburgh, PA. The album cover “Frequency Of Flower of Life” was created by artist Emily Arnold.

Reception

All Are One is receiving positive critical reviews with comparisons to Kate Bush, Air, Peter Gabriel, Brian Eno, Robert Fripp, Janis Joplin, Florence & The Machine, Aretha Franklin.

=== Chamber collaborations ===
Sophe Lux has performed and collaborated with chamber ensembles including Portland's Classical Revolution, and The Portland Cello Project. In these performances, arrangements were crafted for chamber instruments to perform live with Sophe Lux.

In the band's performance with The Portland Cello Project, the Sophe Lux song, "Target Market" was performed with a score created by Mattie Kaiser for four cellos. In another performance with Classical Revolution Portland, a string quartet arrangement was created to accompany Sophe Lux in a performance of the song "Fill Me Up with Grace." The choral arrangement on the track "Marie Antoinette Robot 2073" appearing on The Mystics was composed by Camelia Nine. The baroque introduction to the song "Electra 33" on "Waking the Mystics" was arranged by Kelly Goodwin.

== Videos ==
Haynes is a multimedia artist who has made self-produced videos for All Are One, The Love Comet which is about an alien child in our future, was premiered in Stereo Embers Magazine and Love is Waiting premiered in Blurt online Magazine.

== Members ==
=== Current ===
- Gwynneth Haynes - keys, lead vocals, guitar (2002–present)

=== Past/Guest ===
- Ken Yates - guitar
- Twayn Willams - guitar
- Larry Crane - multi-instrumentalist
- Mike Clark - keys
- Kelly Goodwin - keys
- Brianna Ratterman - keys
- Scott Appleman - drums
- Kent Sisson - drums
- John Moen - drums
- Jeff Grazier - bass
- Erika Miller - bass

== Discography ==
=== Albums ===
- 2002: Plastic Apple
- 2007: Waking The Mystics
- 2009: Hungry Ghost EP
- 2016: All Are One Sophe Lux & The Mystic: "All Are One"
