= Brock Landers =

Brock Landers may refer to:

- A character portrayed by protagonist Dirk Diggler in the 1997 film Boogie Nights
- A song by The Tyde from their 2006 album Three's Co.
- A pen name used by American politician Ben Quayle
