= Sunny Buick =

French-American painter (born 1970)

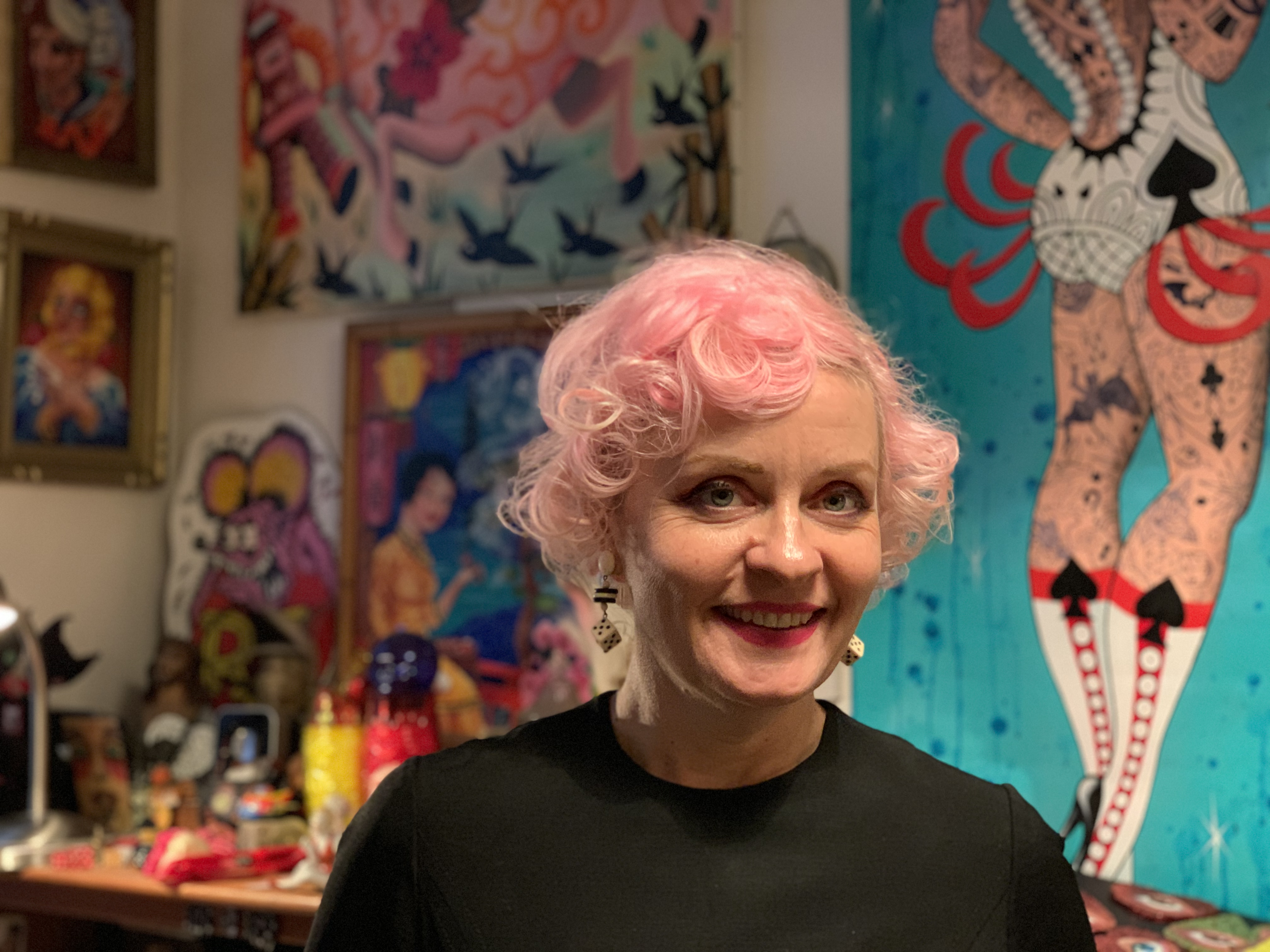
- Born: Gypsy Sunshine Buik; August 4, 1970 (age 55); Nakusp, British Columbia, Canada
- Education: San Francisco State University
- Known for: Painting, Performance, Lowbrow Pop Surrealism, Tattoo Art
- Website: sunnybuick.com

Sunny Buick (née Gypsy Sunshine Buik, born August 4, 1970) is a Canadian-born tattoo artist and painter who participated in the Lowbrow Pop Surrealism movement of California, USA from 1996 to 2003. Buick lives in Paris, France. She is also a figure in the Rockabilly/Swing and Tiki revival movements. A painter and tattoo artist, she was part of the second wave of lowbrow artists in California. Her work being recognized by the leading magazine of the movement Juxtapoz and a book about the women in the movement, Vicious, Delicious and Ambitious by Sherri Cullison. She was the first person to introduce authentic American old school tattooing in France.

== Early life and education ==
Sunny Buick was born at home in Nakusp, British Columbia, Canada on August 4, 1970; in a cabin in the woods with no running water, no electricity. A midwife, family and friends were present. Named after Ken Kesey's daughter Sunshine and her mother's best friend Gypsy. It was always her mother's intention that she be called by her middle name. At age 15 she changed the spelling of her last name from Buik to Buick. When Buick was less than 2 years old she moved to the United States. She returned to Canada at the age of 5, attended school for a short period and returned to the US for good not to visit again until 2009. Her middle school years were spent in Santa Cruz, California and High School onwards was spent in San Francisco, California.

Buick earned her BFA from San Francisco State University in 1992 and studied with Renny Pritikin. She began tattooing in 1992, started an apprenticeship in 1996 with Henry Goldfield. In 2003, Buick moved to France and became a French citizen 10 years later. (17) Buick curated a handful of small group shows such as “Las Vegas Grind Lowbrow Art” Gold Coast Hotel, Las Vegas, Nevada in 2000, and the “Sci-Fi Western” 111 Minna Gallery, in San Francisco, California in 2003.

== Eyecandy Bulimia, the film ==
In 2019, Buick premiered her film Eyecandy Bulimia at the Wild Weekend Music Festival in Majorca, Spain. In the movie, Buick embraces three distinct personas; Dr. Swartzvisie, Shady Cadillac, and Etoile du Jour. Each persona documents their view on Lowbrow Pop Surrealism. Dr. Swartzvisie is a harsh critic of Lowbrow Pop Surrealism. Shady Cadillac embraces lowbrow art as a way to challenge the elitism in the art world. Etoile du Jour sees the movement as a way for DIY Expression and an antithesis to highbrow art. In this way Buick documented the history of the movement and its reception with a socio-historical methodology.

== Artwork influences and inspiration ==
Buick is influenced by historical tattoo flash, pinup art, pulp fiction magazine cover art, Chinese firecracker packaging, Mexican calendar art, surrealism, (Leonora Carrington, Rémedios Varo, Leonor Fini), WPA painters (Thomas Hart Benton), circus and sideshow posters.Sunny Buick is inspired by literature especially by Angela Carter and Paul Auster, popular culture (the Tiki revival movement), music, cinema, Japanese toys, and tin toys.
