= Jason D'Aquino =

American painter

Jason D'Aquino (born October 22, 1974) is an American artist who works exclusively upon found antiquated objects, primarily in graphite on an incredibly miniature scale. He has been called the "Master of Miniatures", and is part of the Lowbrow (or Pop Surrealist) art movement.

D'Aquino is best known for his 'Matchbook Miniatures' which are meticulously hyper detailed small scale pencil drawings, not exceeding one inch by one inch in dimension, carefully crafted onto the inside cover of vintage strike-on-front matchbooks. D'Aquino's illustrations visit themes of evil, cruelty, madness, and loss of innocence. These motifs derive themselves from his passion for mystery and macabre : his greatest influences being H. P. Lovecraft, Edward Gorey, Hans Bellmer, Maurice Sendak, and serial killers such as Ed Gein and sundry other real-life monsters and deviants of true crime.

== Biography ==
D'Aquino was born on October 22, 1974, and raised in Long Island, New York. He attended Purchase College in Westchester, NY, where he received a degree in Visual Arts. After spending some time in Kingston, NY, he relocated to Buffalo, NY, and he currently resides in East Meadow, NY. In addition to being a fine artist, he has been a tattoo artist since 2000. He currently works at Wyld Chyld tattoo shop in Merrick, NY.

== Miniaturist Methodology & The Found Object ==
D'Aquino is an obsessive collector of sentimental surfaces and found objects: antique books, vintage ledgers, 18th century animal skin vellum, and human skull fragments to name a few. His constant hunt for these found objects has led him to uncover some exceptional treasures. In 2000, he discovered a hand-quilled illustrated whaling manuscript from St. Petersburg Russia, which was so valuable he sold it at Christie's Auction House in New York City. Numerous forms of historical ephemera are transformed from forgotten nostalgia into illuminated masterpieces, as D'Aquino skillfully applies his graphite illustrations to them. He must routinely frequent flea markets, estate sales, and abandoned buildings in order to locate the found objects he prefers to draw on. The complexion of the surfaces he chooses to draw on are never artificially discolored, but rather naturally aged by exposure to the elements over time. He achieves the intense precision in his miniature drawings with the aid of architectural drafting tools and high-magnification goggles. While residing in Kingston, NY, a friend of D'Aquino's was employed at an upscale jewelry shop cutting diamonds, and one day D'Aquino had the opportunity to try his friend's high capacity jewelers magnification goggles on. He instantly fell in love with the challenge of imbuing his graphite drawings with a dense level of detail that the naked eye could not ascertain.

== Matchbook Miniatures ==
In a day and age where most art is first viewed on a computer screen, the scale of D'Aquino's miniature drawings are lost without intimate interaction. Matchbooks became the preferred canvas for D'Aquino's miniature masterpieces because they impose their own built in scale reference. "I love the matchbook because it is a nostalgic, gritty, cheap little souvenir. I enjoy taking such a worthless surface and turning it into a coveted piece of art." Jason D'Aquino has been using the matchbook as a canvas since 2002 and has acquired international acclaim for himself with this innovational idea. He has even inspired many other artists such as Joseph Martinez, Adam Padilla, and Mike Bell, to create spin-off matchbook miniature art.
