= Elizabeth McGrath (artist) =

American artist and singer

Elizabeth (Bloodbath) McGrath
- Born: Hollywood, California, U.S.
- Known for: Oil on Canvas / Mixed Media / Sculpture
- Movement: Lowbrow / Pop Surreal

Elizabeth McGrath (born in Los Angeles, California) is an American artist and singer. She is based in California who works primarily in the fields of sculpture and animation. Her work is often evocative of the darker side of life, and she has been nicknamed Bloodbath McGrath after the subject matter of her works. Along with her career in art, from 1989 to 1999 she was the lead singer for the hardcore band Tongue, and co-founded the fanzine Censor This. From 2000 to 2011 she was the lead singer of the Los Angeles-born band Miss Derringer, along with her husband/songwriter Morgan Slade.

== History ==
McGrath was born in Los Angeles and raised in Echo Park and Altadena, California. Her mother is an immigrant from Singapore. At the age of 13 she was sent to a Fundamentalist Baptist correctional institution called the Victory Christian Academy, and credits that for much of the inspiration for her artwork. She later attended Pasadena City College.

McGrath began her career in art by making flyers for her punk band Tongue and creating a fanzine called Censor This, a collective effort with several other artists. McGrath is self-taught and has been represented by L.A. galleries such La Luz de Jesus and Corey Helford Gallery. Her first showing was at La Luz de Jesus Gallery in Hollywood.

McGrath contributed quotes to Girls Against Girls by author Bonnie Burton.

On November 2, 2013, McGrath was part of a four-woman show in Los Angeles called "Black Moon" with fellow female artists, Jessicka Addams, Camille Rose Garcia and Marion Peck.

== Work ==
=== Books ===
- Everything that Creeps, 2006, ISBN 978-0-86719-638-2

Incurable Disorder, 2013, ISBN 978-0-86719-776-1

=== Exhibitions ===
Solo shows:

- Altarwise by Owl Light, 10 December- 14 January 2005, Billy Shire Fine Arts
- Everything That Creeps, July 5, 2002, La Luz De Jesus Gallery

Selected group shows:

- "HATE THE LIVING", March 25, 2007 Victory studios, Studio City
- "THE TREASURES OF LONG GONE JOHN", February 3, 2007 Grand Central Art Center in Santa Ana
- "JUXTAPOZ group art show 2006", March 24-March 25, OX-OP, Minneapolis
- "Salon Style", April 6 -May 1, the Shooting Gallery, San Francisco
- "NACHTSCHATTENGEWAECHS", February 7 – March 7, STRYCHNIN, Berlin
- "Art on the Frontier", Art Center Sarasota, Sarasota, Florida
- Monsters A GO GO, 15 October to Nov. 2004, Roq La Rue, Seattle
- Juxtapoz NYC Group art show, October 2, 2004, Fuse Gallery, New York City
- "Ghost Town", a group art show, October, Tin Man Alley, Philadelphia, Pennsylvania
- "Illuminated Delusions", September 2004, M Modern Gallery, Palm Springs, California
- "Nightmare on 18th Street", 30 October, hosted by the Pandemonium Collective, at the 18th Street Art Center, Santa Monica, California
- MF Gallery's 2nd Annual Halloween group Show, 10 September – 2 November 2004, MF Gallery, New York City
- benefit group show for the West Memphis Three, October 1, 2004, at Perihelion Arts, Phoenix, Arizona
- "Qeedrophonic", a group art show featuring the Qee figure, October 14, Tokyo
- October 2004 at Tower framing and design gallery, Sacramento, California
- 00 Artists See Satan, July 3 – September 19, a group art show at the Grand Central Art Center, Santa Ana, California
- "Characters by Design", July 7-July 31, a group art show at the Grey Matters Gallery, Dallas, Texas
- "Motherhome of the Dolly Bird", July 8 – August 8 at the Shooting Gallery, San Francisco, California
- "Queedrophonic", a group art show, July 10 – August 10 at the Ox-Op Gallery, Minneapolis
- "50 Caliber", July 10 – August 10, a group show at Tower framing and design gallery, Sacramento, California
- "Rated XX Group Show", April 3, 2004, Ox Op, Minneapolis
- "The Rawk Art Show", March 10, 2004, Gallery Lombardi, Austin, Texas
- "Sirens", March 6, 2004, C-Pop Gallery, Detroit, Michigan
- 7th Annual Group Show, March 5, 2004, La Luz De Jesus Gallery, Hollywood
- "In Honor of the Beheading of St. Valentine", February 7, 2004, Copro/Nason Fine Art Gallery, Culver City, California
- "Big Men in Little Cars", January 10, 2004, Tin Man Alley, Philadelphia, Pennsylvania
- "Toy Show", November 2003, MF Gallery, New York City
- "The Greatest Album Covers that Never Were", October 11, 2003, Track 16 Gallery, Santa Monica, California
- "The Haunted Doll House", October 4, 2003, co-curated by Liz Mcgrath, Copro/Nason Fine Art Gallery, Culver City, California
- "Paintings and Sculptures with Helen Garber", September 13, 2003, Roshambo Winery, Healdsburg, California
- "Woodstock Tattoo and Body Arts Festival", September 5, 2003, Hawthorn Gallery Modern Art Visionary Exhibit, Woodstock, New York
- "Cruel and Unusual: A Benefit for the West Memphis Three", September 6, 2003, Six Space Gallery, Los Angeles, California
- "Rude G! Murder Mystery Mayhem: A Fundraiser for Rude Guerrilla Theater Company", September 13, 2003, Rude Guerrilla Theater Company, Santa Ana, California
- "High On Life: Transcending Addiction", October 3, 2002 – August 2003, The American Visionary Art Museum, Baltimore, Maryland
- "Vicious Delicious and Ambitious", June 2, 2003, Fuse Gallery, New York City
- "Ed Big Daddy Roth Tribute", July 12 – 29 August 2003, Copro/Nason Fine Art Gallery, Culver City, California
- "Feathered Friends", July 3, 2003, MOTEL, Portland, Oregon
- "Lovely: A Benefit Group Show for 'Youth Speaks'", 2 August 2003, Club 6, San Francisco, California
- "Vicious Delicious and Ambitious", May 2, 2003, Perihlion Arts, Phoenix, Arizona
- "Experimental Toy Skeleton", April – May 2003, Covivant, Tampa, Florida
- "Sci-Fi Western", 23 January 2003, 111 Minna Gallery, San Francisco, California
- "Pirate Booty: The Art of Mates & Wenches", December 7, 2002, Six Space Gallery, Los Angeles, California
- "Uncommercial Art by Commercial Artists", November 9, 2002, La Luz De Jesus Gallery, Hollywood
- "Alive and Well AIDS Alternatives", November 9, 2002, La Luz De Jesus Gallery, Hollywood
- "Juxtapoz Exhibition", October 26, 2002, Track 16 Gallery, Santa Monica, California
- "The Scintillating Six", June 1, 2002, Bink Gallery, Portland, Oregon
- "Circus, Carnival, Freaks and Oddities", April 6, 2002, C-POP Gallery, Detroit, Michigan
- "Clown Oil and Snake Eyes", December 1, 2001, Copro/Nason Fine Art Gallery, Culver City, California
- "The Frankenstein Surf Shack", 19 October 2001, Roq La Rue, Seattle, Washington
- "Commercial Artists Doing Non-Commercial Art", March 2, 2001, La Luz De Jesus Gallery, Hollywood
- "Milk Blood", February 2, 2001, La Luz De Jesus Gallery, Hollywood
- "The Definitive Retrospective", December 2, 2000, Copro/Nason Fine Art Gallery, Culver City, California
- "Metro Madness", September 16, 2000, Copro/Nason Fine Art Gallery
- "Intoxication Show", April 2000, The Laboratory, Los Angeles
- "Commercial Artists Doing Non-Commercial Art", March 2000, La Luz De Jesus Gallery
- "Low Brow Art", February 2000, The Art and Culture Center of Hollywood, Hollywood, Florida
- "Leeteg Tribute Show", December 1999, Copro/Nason Gallery
- "Group Show", November 1998, Huntington Beach Art Center Gallery, Huntington Beach, California
- "Kittens 'N' Cads", December 1998, Merry Karnowsky Gallery, Los Angeles
- "Hollywood Satan", December 1998, Mark Moore Gallery, Santa Monica, California
- "Best of the West", October 1998, 001 Gallery, Hollywood
