= Carla DeSantis Black =

American writer

- Born: February 21, 1958 (age 67); Boston, MA, U.S.
- Known for: Musicians for Equal Opportunities for Women (MEOW), ROCKRGRL, advocacy for women in music, music journalism
- Website: www.carlablackatx.com

Carla DeSantis Black (born February 21, 1958) is a writer and advocate for women in music. Sometimes referred to as “The Gloria Steinem of Rock,” she is the founder of ROCKRGRL Magazine (1995-2005) and MEOW - Musicians for Equal Opportunities for Women (2010-2013).

== Early life ==
Black was born in Boston, Massachusetts and graduated from high school in San Jose, California in 1975. She attended college at Chico State University from 1975–1978 to study communications and theater arts but left after two years to pursue music full-time.

In 1979 she moved to Eugene, Oregon to continue college and quickly became immersed in the city's emerging music scene, serving as the entertainment editor of the Lane Community College newspaper, The Torch and singing with a local band.

In 1982 and back in the Bay Area, Black joined an all-female cover band. Although she initially did not know how to play bass, she learned on-the-job.

In 1990 she formed an oldies band with two members of her former all-female band, performing at fairs, festivals and private parties.

== ROCKRGRL ==
In 1994 Black created ROCKRGRL, a magazine for female musicians, noting the lack of positive attention given to women musicians she had experienced first-hand. The premier issue of ROCKRGRL was 14 pages, black and white and released on January 1, 1995.

ROCKRGRL published 57 issues with Black at the helm for the entire run. Sleater-Kinney and Tegan and Sara were featured on the cover of ROCKRGRL early in their career. The final issue of ROCKRGRL was published in the fall of 2005.

Black also produced The ROCKRGRL Music Conference in Seattle in 2000 (honoring Heart with the Woman of Valor Award and featuring Keynote addresses by Ronnie Spector, Amy Ray and Courtney Love) and again in 2005 (honoring Patti Smith with the Woman of Valor Award and featuring Keynote addresses by Smith and Johnette Napolitano of Concrete Blonde).

She was elected three times to the Board of Governors of the Pacific Northwest Chapter of the GRAMMYs and has served on the advisory boards for Seattle's The Vera Project (capital campaign), Bitch Magazine and the Institute for Musical Arts.

The ROCKRGRL Archives were purchased by Schlesinger Library at Radcliffe University in 2008.

GRL Talk, a collection of quotes from ROCKRGRL Magazine, was published in 2013 via funds raised through Kickstarter.

== Musicians for Equal Opportunities for Women (MEOW) ==
In 2010, Black left Seattle, Washington for Austin, Texas, to create Musicians for Equal Opportunities for Women, an organization with a similar mission to ROCKRGRL but event-focused. MEOW has produced four conferences to date – MEOW Day in November 2011; May 2012 and November 2012 and the MEOW Conference, October 24–26, 2013.

MEOW hosted MEOW Con, a three-day conference on the state of women in music October 24–26, 2013 at the Renaissance Hotel in Austin, Texas. Keynote speaker on Friday, October 25, was Suzi Quatro, and Kathy Valentine on Saturday, October 26. Margaret Moser and Quatro were honored with Woman of Valor Awards on October 24.

== Awards and projects ==
In 2006, Black was named one of the "50 Most Influential People In Seattle music" by Seattle (Sound) and has twice been nominated for a Lifetime Achievement Award by Seattle Weekly.

From 2006 to 2008 Black was head of artist relations for Luna Guitars and published a weekly blog at Ourstage.com.

She lectures on the topic of gender disparity in rock and has written for numerous publications, including Rolling Stone and The Seattle Times.
