= Amy Sol =

American painter

- Born: 1981 (age 44–45); Korea
- Education: Self Trained
- Known for: Painting
- Movement: Pop Surreal, Cartoon-Tainted Abstract Surrealism

Amy Sol (born 1981) is an American artist of Korean ancestry, who lives in Las Vegas, Nevada. She is a member in good standing of a loose knit community of artists practicing Pop Surreal, Lowbrow, or, as Robert Williams defines it, "cartoon-tainted abstract surrealism." She typically paints upon treated wooden panel, incorporating the grain of the wood into the painting. Her style integrates both narrative and figurative styles with the mystic.

The reason (is) the wood really helps me a lot, and I've sort of become addicted to using wood panel. It's become a really important part of the whole piece -- all together -- it holds the whole piece together. The grain of the wood usually is the start of the motion; the flow. The wood always reminds me to keep things moving. When you look at wood grain, sometimes -- and you can almost feel the sense of something alive, of course it was once alive, but that imprint; the foot-print of it is still there. When I paint right on the wood it influences the colors I use. It reminds me to keep things really natural.

— Amy Sol, Semi-Permanent Lecture, 2008 Sydney, Australia

Sol's works are characterized by young maidens in dream-like nature settings with oversized or sometimes fanciful creatures. One gets a sense that the girls are interacting with the animals as mythic partners or perhaps "familiars." There is no indication that these animals are pets; rather friends or perhaps partners. The exotic landscapes include plants, impossible trees, mist & fog, clouds, flowers, and rolling hills. With a muted palette of pastels and washed out grays; her style is influenced by folk-art, contemporary illustration, manga, and modern design.

Sol has named Range Murata and Kay Nielsen among others as inspirations for her work.
