= Sweet Heart Dealer =

Debut album by rock band Scarling

- Original album artwork by Mark Ryden

Studio album by Scarling.
- Released: February 17, 2004
- Recorded: 2002–2003
- Studio: June 3rd Studios and Amethyst Studios, California
- Genre: Noise pop; gothic rock; shoegaze
- Length: 33:18
- Label: Sympathy for the Record Industry
- Producer: Chris Vrenna

Scarling. chronology
| Sweet Heart Dealer (2004) | So Long, Scarecrow (2005) |

Singles from Sweet Heart Dealer
- 1. "Band Aid Covers the Bullet Hole" Released: March 19, 2003 (Note: 7" Single. CD single released December 16, 2003.); 2. "Crispin Glover" Released: November 7, 2004

Professional ratings
Review scores
| Source | Rating |
|---|---|
| Allmusic | link |
| Bust (magazine) | Favourable |
| ROCKRGRL | Favourable |
| Venus Zine | Favourable |

Sweet Heart Dealer is the debut studio album by the rock band Scarling., released on February 17, 2004, through Sympathy For The Record Industry. Originally scheduled for release as Butcherbourne, the album was retitled at the last minute, and pared down from 11 tracks to seven during mixing at Old Blue Studios in Los Angeles. The songs "A Constant Reminder", "Surgeon General", "Here On Earth" and "Funeral Gown" were recorded then omitted and have yet to be released.

Robert Smith of The Cure described Scarling's music as "dark, desperate, chaotic, gorgeous pop music, the sound of the end of the world."

== Track listing ==
All songs written by Jessicka and Christian Hejnal.

1. "The Last Day I Was Happy" – 3:49
2. "Band Aid Covers the Bullet Hole" – 3:26
3. "Crispin Glover" – 3:18
4. "Alexander the Burn Victim" – 6:00
5. "Baby Dracula" – 3:54
6. "Black Horse Riding Star" – 5:31
7. "Can't (Halloween Valentine)" – 7:21

== LP Track listing ==
Side A

1. "The Last Day I Was Happy" – 3:49
2. "Crispin Glover" – 3:18
3. "Band Aid Covers the Bullet Hole" – 3:26
4. "Baby Dracula" – 3:54
5. "Love Becomes a Ghost" (LP bonus track)

Side B

1. "Black Horse Riding Star" – 5:31
2. "Alexander the Burn Victim" – 6:00
3. "Can't (Halloween Valentine)" – 7:21
- Note: the LP sleeve incorrectly transposes the songs "Alexander the Burn Victim" and "Baby Dracula"

== Personnel ==
Credits are adapted from the album's liner notes.

- Jessicka — vocals, additional art
- Christian Hejnal — guitar, bass
- Rickey Lime — guitar
- Garey Snider — drums
- Bobby Hidalgo — additional bass
- Chris Vrenna — producer
- Erik Colvin — mixing
- Logan Mader — engineer
- John Vestman — mastering
- Leslie Ann Sundoll — art direction
- Piper Ferguson — photography
- Mark Ryden — cover art

== Charts and awards ==
- Nominee, 2004 Shortlist Music Prize
