= Evan Pricco =

American journalist

Evan Pricco is an American author, curator, former editor-in-chief of Juxtapoz magazine, and current editor-in-chief of The Unibrow.

== Life and Work ==
Prior to his position at Juxtapoz, Pricco worked with Francisco-based apparel company Upper Playground under CEO and Founder, Matt Revelli.

=== Juxtapoz ===
Pricco was the editor in Chief of Juxtapoz from 2006 to 2026. As well the direction of the magazine, Pricco produces global off site projects, installations, brand collaborations, and curatorial projects. Recent exhibitions include Juxtapoz x Superflat an exhibition co curated with Takashi Murakami at the Vancouver Art Gallery. Pricco has also contributed articles to other publications. In 2019, he was invited to discuss Art and Activism in a Freedom special for Playboy introducing six artists.

=== The Unibrow ===
In 2025, Pricco founded The Unibrow, an arts and culture magazine published twice a year.

== Publications ==
Pricco is the author of Juxtapoz book series which includes publications on contemporary painting and illustration.

- Juxtapoz Illustration. Gingko. 2008. ISBN 978-1-58423-289-6.
- Juxtapoz Erotica. Gingko. 2010. ISBN 978-1584233954.
- Juxtapoz Illustration 2. Gingko. 2010. ISBN 978-1584234234.
- Juxtapoz Tattoo 2. Gingko. 2011. ISBN 978-1584234227.
- Juxtapoz Hyperrealism. Gingko. 2014. ISBN 978-1584235743.
- Juxtapoz Wild. Gingko. 2016. ISBN 978-1584235941.
- Juxtapoz Black and White. Gingko. 2019. ISBN 978-1584236825.
