= So Long, Scarecrow =

Studio album by Scarling.
- Released: October 25, 2005
- Recorded: Early 2005
- Studios: Figment Sounds, California
- Genres: Noise pop; gothic rock; shoegaze
- Length: 52:32
- Labels: Sympathy for the Record Industry; SFTRI 758 CD
- Producers: Rob Campanella; Christian Hejnal

Scarling. chronology
Sweet Heart Dealer (2004)	So Long, Scarecrow (2005)	Staring to the Sun (2006)

Alternative cover
- Sympathy For The Record Industry vinyl edition cover by Mark Ryden

Singles from So Long, Scarecrow
- 1. "We Are the Music Makers" Released: 2005; 2. "Staring to the Sun" Released: June 6, 2006

So Long, Scarecrow is the second and final studio album by the rock band Scarling. Written and recorded in early 2005, and released on October 25, 2005. It is Scarling.'s only album to feature drummer Beth Gordon. Its title is a reference to The Wizard of Oz: in lead vocalist Jessicka's view, the film's Scarecrow is a metaphor for the band itself; the character's initial lack of and search for a brain, she explains, parallels Scarling.'s search for new territory in a predictable and monotonous musical environment.

The album was preceded by the single "We Are the Music Makers," a split 7-inch with The Willowz, and has been reissued on vinyl by Sympathy for the Record Industry with alternative cover artwork by Mark Ryden.

== Production and composition ==
Nearly twice as long as the band's debut, Sweet Heart Dealer, So Long, Scarecrow differs from its predecessor not only in length but also in terms of musical atmosphere. This is largely due to the switch in producers between the two albums — from former Nine Inch Nails member Chris Vrenna, whose abrasive, industrial-style production appeared on Sweet Heart Dealer; to Rob Campanella, of the psychedelic rock group The Brian Jonestown Massacre, and Scarling. guitarist Christian Hejnal, himself influenced by noise rock and No Wave. The album was recorded at Campanella's studio, the Committee to Keep Music Evil Headquarters/Figment Sounds.

== Reception ==
Professional ratings
Review scores
Source	Rating
Allmusic	3.5/5 stars
Alternative Press	5/5 stars
Filter Magazine	85%
Bust (magazine)	Favourable
Spin	Favourable
ROCKRGRL	Favourable
ScenePointBlank.com	Favourable
Venus Zine	Favourable

So Long, Scarecrow received several favourable reviews: Alternative Press gave the album a 5 out of 5 rating and described Hejnal as a "guitar physicist who holds court over these atmospheric rockers’ second album, approximating everything from space-station climates to sperm whales rollin’ on E, all while delivering solid songs." The Independent noted “Scarling. work up a wonderfully hazy guitar swirl, reminiscent of post-My Bloody Valentine noise-pop from the Britain of the early nineties.” and Bust described the album as "the musical equivalent of an Edward Gorey illustration: ominous and shadowy, but not without a certain sense of morbid joy. Sly lyrics and sarcastic insights pepper Scarecrow’s dystopian soundscape, proving that Scarling has picked up more than just wardrobe inspiration from vets like the Cure." While Jon Wiederhorn said, "guitarist Christian Hejnal, Scarling provide the much-needed element of violence and sexuality other modern shoegazers lack."

== Track listing ==
All tracks are written by Jessicka and Christian Hejnal.

No.	Title	Length
1.	"Hello London"	5:50
2.	"City Noise"	3:17
3.	"Broken Record"	4:38
4.	"(Northbound On) Cahuenga"	6:08
5.	"Teenage Party Letdown"	0:35
6.	"Bummer"	3:56
7.	"Manorexic"	4:24
8.	"In the Pretend World"	4:14
9.	"Stapled to the Mattress"	5:41
10.	"Like a Killer"	2:55
11.	"Caribou and Cake"	3:25
12.	"We Are the Music Makers"	3:27
13.	"So Long, Scarecrow"	4:02
Total length:		52:32

== Personnel ==
- Jessicka — vocals
- Christian Hejnal — guitar, bass, producer, mixing
- Rickey Lime — guitar
- Beth Gordon — drums
- Rob Campanella — producer, engineer
- Erik Colvin — producer, vocal tracking
- Richard Mouser — mixing
- John Vestman — mastering, mixing
- Piper Ferguson — photography, cover art
- Mark Ryden — alternate LP cover art
