= Crispin Glover (song) =

Single by Scarling.

from the album Sweet Heart Dealer
- Released: November 7, 2004 (7")
- Recorded: Spring 2004, June 3rd Studios and Amethyst Studios, California
- Genre: Shoegazing, Dream pop
- Label: Sympathy for the Record Industry; SFTRI 738 (pink 7"); SFTRI 739 (red 7")
- Songwriter(s): Jessica Fodera
- Producer(s): Chris Vrenna, Christian Hejnal, Erik Colvin

Scarling. singles chronology
"Band Aid Covers the Bullet Hole" (2003)	"Crispin Glover" (2004)	"Scarling. / The Willowz" (2005)

"Crispin Glover" is the second single from Scarling.'s debut album, Sweet Heart Dealer. It was released in the USA on two separate 7" vinyl records on November 7, 2004 on the Sympathy for the Record Industry label. Each record has its own cover art – one a portrait of the song's titular actor, the other a photo of the band – and a unique b-side.

The title track on both discs has been remixed from the version of "Crispin Glover" on Sweet Heart Dealer.

== Track listings and versions ==
- Digital Download
1. "Crispin Glover" – 3:15
2. "Art of Pretension" – 3:58
3. "Love Becomes a Ghost" – 4:47
- SFTRI 738 (pink vinyl)
1. "Crispin Glover"
2. "Art of Pretension"
- SFTRI 739 (red vinyl)
1. "Crispin Glover"
2. "Love Becomes a Ghost"

== Personnel ==
- Jessicka – vocals
- Christian Hejnal – guitar, vocals
- Rickey Lime – guitar
- Kyle Lime – bass
- Garey Snider – drums
- Chris Vrenna – producer
- Erik Colvin – mixing, producer
