= Once (The Tyde album) =

Studio album by The Tyde
- Released: 2001
- Genre: Indie rock
- Length: 42:06
- Label: The Track & Field Organisation
- Producer: Darren Rademaker, Rob Campanella

The Tyde chronology
Once (2001)	Twice (2003)

Professional ratings
Review scores
Source	Rating
Allmusic	4/5 stars
NME	7/10 stars

Once is the debut album by American indie rock band The Tyde, released in 2001.

Neal Casal, of Ryan Adams and the Cardinals, lists Once as one of his favourite albums of all time.

== Track listing ==
All songs written by Darren Rademaker.

1. "All My Bastard Children" – 5:09
2. "New Confessions" – 3:15
3. "Strangers Again" – 3:13
4. "Get Around Too" – 5:18
5. "North County Times" – 2:26
6. "The Dawn" – 5:54
7. "Improper" – 2:45
8. "Your Tattoos" – 4:17
9. "Silver's Okay Michelle" – 9:42

== Personnel ==
The Tyde

- Darren Rademaker – lead vocals, guitars
- Benjamin Knight — guitars, backing vocals
- Ann Do — Fender Rhodes and acoustic pianos, synthesizer
- David Scher — organ, lap steel guitar
- Brent Rademaker — bass, backing vocals
- Christopher Gunst — drums

Additional personnel

- Dominic Campanella – backing vocals, recording
- John "Twink" Alder — tambourine
