= Juxtapoz =

Journal of urban alternative and underground contemporary art

- Editor-in-Chief: Evan Pricco
- Categories: Art magazine
- Frequency: Monthly
- First issue: 1994
- Company: High Speed Productions
- Country: United States
- Based in: San Francisco, California
- Language: English
- Website: Juxtapoz.com
- ISSN: 1077-8411
- OCLC: 30889397

Juxtapoz Art & Culture Magazine (pronounced JUX-tah-pose) is a magazine created in 1994 by a group of artists and art collectors including Robert Williams, Fausto Vitello, C.R. Stecyk III (a.k.a. Craig Stecyk), Greg Escalante, and Eric Swenson to both help define and celebrate urban alternative and underground contemporary art. Juxtapoz is published by High Speed Productions, the same company that publishes Thrasher skateboard magazine in San Francisco, California.

== Scope ==
Juxtapoz launched with the mission of connecting modern genres like psychedelic and hot rod art, graffiti, street art, and illustration, to the context of broader more historically recognized genres of art like Pop, assemblage, old master painting, and conceptual art. Although based in San Francisco, Juxtapoz was founded upon the belief in the virtues of Southern California pop culture and freedom from the conventions of the "established" New York City art world. Ferus Gallery, run by Walter Hopps and Irving Blum in the 1950s and 1960s, was the ultimate cultural touchstone for the magazine.

Juxtapoz originally reflected Williams' own Kustom Kulture sensibility – a combination of California "Big Daddy" Ed Roth–style pop surrealism (identified by some as synonymous with lowbrow art and others as its own genre) and the serious figurative craftsmanship that is more likely to be found among illustrators than fine artists today.

== Growth ==
Juxtapoz expanded its range in the early 2000s to cover other nascent styles and subgenres of underground art. Artists who have received coverage in Juxtapoz include KAWS, Mark Ryden, Barry McGee, Todd Schorr, Tara McPherson, Camille Rose Garcia, Tim Biskup, Anthony Ausgang, Michael Pearce and Tom Sachs.

As of 2009, Juxtapoz had the largest circulation of any art magazine in the United States, more than established counterparts like Art News, Art in America, and Artforum. In addition to printed subscriptions which offer alternative cover images to the newsstand version, Juxtapoz is also available as an online digital subscription.

Evan Pricco is the editor-in-chief.

== See also ==
- Hot Rod
- Lowbrow art
- Niagara
