= The Tyde =

American indie rock band

- Origin: Los Angeles, California
- Genres: Indie rock, psychedelic pop
- Years active: 2000–present
- Label: Rough Trade
- Members: Darren Rademaker, Ben Knight, Brent Rademaker, Derek James, Bobby Rodriguez
- Past members: Ann Do Rademaker, Christopher Gunst, Dave Scher, Ric Menck, Josh Schwartz, Dane Garrard, Richard Gowen, Judy Byun, Colby Buddelmeyer

The Tyde are an American indie rock group. Tracing their roots to early 1990s LA indie band Further, formed by Darren Rademaker and brother Brent. The Tyde cite Felt, the Beach Boys and the Byrds as major influences. They are not to be confused with band from the Iowa in the late 1960s called the TYDE, known for songs such as "Psychedelic Pill" and "Lost".

The initial line-up featured Darren Rademaker (vocals, guitars), Darren's ex-wife Anh Do Rademaker (keyboards) and brother Brent Rademaker (bass, vocals) as well as Ben Knight (guitar), Christopher Gunst, Brent's partner in Beachwood Sparks, (drums) and Dave Scher (guitars). Gunst was replaced by Ric Menck of Velvet Crush after debut album Once while Scher became simply an "additional musician" for second album Twice.

== History ==
Both 2001s Once and its follow-up, 2003s Twice, showcase the band's love of surfing. The former featuring the song "North County Times", about time spent in surfers' paradise Encinitas, while the latter features a cartoon of a surfer heading out to the waves as well as the track "New D" featuring the lyrics "ain't gonna fight 'em anymore, leave those bastard people on the shore, surf a wave on a single-fin board".

Brent Rademaker also played bass in Beachwood Sparks with former Further and Tyde member Christopher Gunst. He now shares his time between the Tyde and his new group Frausdots. Gunst's new group, Mystic Chords of Memory, also features Ben Knight on guitar.

Three's Co., the Tyde's third album, was released in 2006 (April/UK; July/Japan; August/US) and features guest appearances from Mickey Madden of Maroon 5 and Conor Deasy of the Thrills. Their fourth album, Darren 4, was released in 2016.

== Discography ==
Albums

- Once (2001)
- Twice (2003)
- Three's Co. (2006)
- Darren 4 (2016)

Singles

- "Strangers Again"/"Improper" (2000)
- "All My Bastard Children"/"Silver's Okay Michelle" (2001)
- "The World's Strongest Man/"Sullen Eyes" (2001)
- "Blood Brothers EP" (2002)
- "Go Ask Yer Dad"/"Henry VIII" (April 2003) (UK)
- "Go Ask Yer Dad"/"Blood Brothers" (7"/CD single also includes "Play It As It Lays") (May 2003) (US)
- "Look By In Anger"/"Roadrunner" (2004)
- "Hung Up" from Through the Wildress: a tribute to Madonna (Manimal Vinyl 2007)
- "Through the Wilderness": a tribute to Madonna CD/LP
