= Miss Derringer =

Miss Derringer is an American, Los Angeles based pop/underground rock band, fronted by singer Elizabeth McGrath and her husband/songwriter Morgan Slade. Rounding out the band's current lineup are Sylvain de Muizon (bass), Cody James (drums) and Ben Shields (lead guitar). Miss Derringer, although it sounds like a singer or a single person, is a complete band.

Miss Derringer is influenced by American music of the late 1950s and early 1960s–particularly the vintage sounds of outlaw country and early 1960s girl group pop.

On their debut album, King James, some of the all star players in the band were Jula Bell (ex-Bobsled and Bulimia Banquet) on autoharp and background vox, Jeremy Szuder (Los Cincos) on drums, and Mark Miller (Skeetertruck) on guitar. Miss Derringer has opened up for several notable acts including Bad Religion, Blondie, John Doe, IAMX and Tiger Army. Miss Derringer has released two albums with Sympathy for the Record Industry. The first, King James, Crown Royal, and a Colt 45, was released in 2004.

Their second album, Lullabies, includes guest musicians such as drummer Clem Burke from Blondie and was co-produced by Derek O'Brien of Social Distortion and The Adolescents. In 2007, Miss Derringer released the 2 song ep "Black Tears" electronically on Stay Gold Records. Black Tears was produced by John Kastner of The Doughboys and All Systems Go! The song "Black Tears" and its remix version have been featured on the television show How I Met Your Mother.

In 2008 the band signed a "strategic partnership" marketing deal with noted Advertising Agency Deutsch Inc. In late 2008, Miss Derringer was selected by Morgans Hotel Group as one several bands to participate in their "Recess is on" campaign, and was filmed performing a live version of their song "better Run Away From Me" at the Mondrian Hotel in Los Angeles. In February 2009, Miss Derringer signed a record deal with Los Angeles label Triple X Records, who released the band's third album Winter Hill in July 2009.
