= Staring to the Sun =

EP / single by Scarling.
- Released: June 6, 2006
- Recorded: 2005
- Studio: Figment Sounds, California
- Genre: Noise pop
- Length: 9:53
- Label: Sympathy for the Record Industry; SFTRI 773 (CD)
- Producer: Rob Campanella

Scarling. chronology
So Long, Scarecrow (2005)	Staring to the Sun (2006)	"Who Wants to Die for Art?" (2013)

Staring to the Sun is a single and an extended play (EP) by American noise pop band Scarling. It was released on June 6, 2006. "Staring to the Sun" seems to be a sister song to So Long, Scarecrow's title track as the two songs share multiple lines of lyrics.

Aside from the title track, the single came with two B-sides; "City Noise", taken from their previous album So Long, Scarecrow and a cover of Pixies' "Wave of Mutilation".

== Track listing ==
1. "City Noise"
2. "Staring to the Sun"
3. "Wave of Mutilation"

== Personnel ==
- Jessicka – vocals
- Christian Hejnal – guitar, vocals, bass
- Rickey Lime – guitar
- Beth Gordon – drums
- Rob Campanella – producer
- Piper Ferguson – cover photography

== Review ==
- Allmusic link
