= Twice (The Tyde album) =

Studio album by The Tyde
- Released: 2003
- Genre: Indie rock
- Length: 41:43
- Label: Rough Trade
- Producer: Darren Rademaker, Rob Campanella

The Tyde chronology
Once (2001)	Twice (2003)	Three's Co. (2006)

Professional ratings
Aggregate scores
Source	Rating
Metacritic	79/100 link
Review scores
Source	Rating
Allmusic	link
Pitchfork Media	7.0/10 link

Twice is the second album by American indie rock band The Tyde, released in 2003.

== Track listing ==
All songs written by Darren Rademaker.

1. "A Loner" – 3:52
2. "Henry VIII" – 2:36
3. "Go Ask Yer Dad" – 4:17
4. "Best Intentions" – 4:54
5. "Crystal Canyons" – 1:59
6. "Takes A Lot Of Tryin'" – 4:24
7. "Memorable Moments" – 4:04
8. "Blood Brothers" – 3:15
9. "Shortboard City" – 2:39
10. "Breaking Up The Band" – 4:34
11. "New D" – 5:08

== Personnel ==
- Darren Rademaker — lead vocals, guitars
- Ben Knight — guitars, backing vocals
- Ann Do — Fender Rhodes electric piano, piano, synthesizers
- Brent Rademaker — bass, backing vocals
- Rick Menck — drums, percussion
- David Scher — additional keyboards, lap steel guitar
- Colby Buddelmeyer — additional backing vocals
- Dominic Campanella — additional backing vocals
