= Camille Rose Garcia =

American lowbrow/pop surrealism artist

- Born: November 18, 1970 (age 55); Los Angeles, California
- Education: Otis College of Art and Design, University of California, Davis
- Occupation: Artist
- Known for: Painting
- Style: pop surrealism

Camille Rose Garcia (born 1970) is a California-based lowbrow/pop surrealism artist. She paints in a goth subculture cartoon style. She says her influences are Walt Disney and Philip K. Dick.

== Early life and education ==
Garcia's parents met in art school in San Francisco. Her father, filmmaker David Garcia, was of Mexican and Yaqui background, and her mother, Rosemary Garcia, is a muralist. Garcia's parents divorced when she was young and her mother raised her and her sister in Orange County, in close proximity to Disneyland.

Camille Rose Garcia received her Master of Fine Arts degree at University of California, Davis in 1994 and her BFA from Otis College of Art and Design in 1992. Six years of art school left her disillusioned and bitter, so she decided to move back home to Huntington Beach, California, and started a band, The Real Minx.

== Career ==
Royal Disorder Poison Party, 2005.

Garcia's first solo show was in 1999 at the Merry Karnowsky Gallery, where she would go on to frequently exhibit. She was one of the artists whose work was featured in the 2004 Last Gasp book Pop Surrealism: The Rise of Underground Art, as an example of the genre.

In 2007, the San Jose Museum of Art held a mid-career retrospective called Tragic Kingdom: The Art of Camille Rose Garcia.

She illustrated a version of Alice's Adventures in Wonderland in 2010. "The original illustrations by John Tenniel have always been some of my favorites," said Garcia in an interview when asked about the book. "I have three copies of the book here because I collect children's stories. That's one of my favorite stories because it's actually a real dark story. She falls down the hole and no one is really nice to her at all. Pretty much every character she encounters, they're not really on her side. So re-reading it I realized I could do a little bit darker of an interpretation than the original illustrations." In 2013, her art for the book was shown at The Walt Disney Family Museum, where her work was displayed alongside that of Mary Blair.

On November 2, 2013, Garcia was part of a four-woman show in Los Angeles called "Black Moon" with fellow female artists, Jessicka Addams, Elizabeth McGrath and Marion Peck.

In 2018, Garcia was honored at Art Basel Miami by Maestro Dobel Tequila for her work as an artist of Mexican heritage.

Garcia's work has appeared in Modern Painters, Juxtapoz, Rolling Stone, Flaunt, and BLAB! magazines. Her paintings are in the collections of the San Jose Museum of Art and LACMA.

== Sources ==
- "Camille Rose Garcia at Grand Central Art Center" Exhibition Review in Artweek, December 2005/January 2006, pp. 17–18.
- Marisa Solis, "Army of Darkness: Camille Rose Garcia Fights the Forces of Evil," Juxtapoz #62, March 2006.
- Manuel Bello, 2006 Interview
