= Rob Campanella =

American musician

- Origin: Silverlake, California, United States
- Genres: Indie rock
- Occupation(s): Musician, producer, engineer
- Instrument(s): Guitar, keyboards

Rob Campanella is an American musician, best known as a Los Angeles producer, engineer, and member of The Quarter After.

== Music career ==
=== Producer and engineer ===
Campanella has produced and engineered albums for his own band The Quarter After, and for clients including The Brian Jonestown Massacre, The Tyde, Beachwood Sparks, Goldrush, Dead Meadow, Mia Doi Todd, The Morning After Girls, and Scarling.

== Discography ==
=== Albums/CDs ===
- The Ethers, The Ethers, album (1999) – producer, engineer
- Sunstorm, Sunstorm, album (2000) – producer, engineer, mixing, guitar
- The Tyde, Once, album (2001) – producer, engineer, mixing
- The Brian Jonestown Massacre, Bravery, Repetition & Noise, album (2001) – producer, engineer, Hammond organ, acoustic guitar, Melotron flute, Spanish guitar, Vox fuzz repeater
- Cloud Eleven, Orange and Green and Yellow and Near, album (2002) – mandolin
- The Tyde, Twice, album (2003) – producer, engineer, mixing
- Dead Meadow, from Buddyhead Presents: Gimme Skelter, album, "Let's Jump In" (2003) — producer, engineer
- The Brian Jonestown Massacre, And This Is Our Music, album (2003) – producer, engineer, Hammond organ, dobro, mandolin, piano
- The Tyde, from Stop Me If You Think You've Heard This One Before: 25 Years of Rough Trade, album, "Tell Me" (2003) — engineer
- Meow Meow, Snow Gas Bones, album (2004), — mixing
- Dead Meadow, from Matador at Fifteen album, "The Whirlings" (2004) – producer, engineer
- Frausdots, Couture, Couture, Couture, album (2004) – mandolin
- Daydream Nation, Bella Vendetta, album (2004) – slide guitar
- Mia Doi Todd, Manzanita, album (2005) – producer, engineer, mixing, dulcimer, mandolin, piano, electric guitar
- Dusty Sound System, Days of Horror, Nights of Splendor, album (2005) – producer, engineer, guitar
- The Quarter After, The Quarter After, album (2005) – producer, engineer, guitar, vocals, piano, Mellotron, organ, dobro, mandolin, bass guitar
- C24C, Stay Gold, album (2005) – producer, engineer, mixing
- Scarling., So Long, Scarecrow, album (2005) – producer, engineer
- Goldrush, Ozona, album (2005) – producer
- Imogene, Imogene, album (2005) – engineer
- The Tyde, Three's Co., album (2006) – producer, engineer, mixing, slide guitar
- Mia Doi Todd, from La Ninja: Amor and Other Dreams of Manzanita, album (2006) "Norwegian Wood" — producer, engineer, acoustic Guitar, Mellotron, and "The Last Night Of Winter" — re-mixer
- The Abe Lincoln Story, Kings Of The Soul Punk Swing, album (2007) – engineer
- The Lovetones, Axiom, album (2007) – producer, engineer, Mellotron, slide guitar, bazouki
- Dead Meadow, Old Growth, album (2008) – producer, engineer
- The Stereo Workers Union, God Bless The Stereo Workers Union!, album (2008) – producer, engineer, guitar, bass, Mellotron, mandolin, sitar, tambourine
- The Quarter After, Changes Near, album (2008) – producer, engineer, mixing, guitar, vocals, Mellotron, piano, Hammond organ, tamboura, dobro
- Meow Meow, Meow Meow, album (2008) – producer, engineer, mixing
- The Lovetones, Dimensions, album (2009) – producer, engineer, mixing, Mellotron, piano
- Lower Heaven, ASHES, album (2009) – engineer, Mellotron
- Chief Nowhere, Chief Nowhere, album (2010) – engineer, Mellotron, Leslie vocals
- Seth Swirsky, Watercolor Day, album (2010) – mixing, engineer, sitar, tampura
- The Lovetones, Lost, album (2010) – engineer, mixing, Mellotron

=== Singles and EPs ===
- Basement Youth Miracle, self-titled EP, (1999); producer, engineer, mixing
- The Drummed, "Eraserhead", EP (1997) – guitar
- The Drummed, "Mosquito", EP (1998) – guitar
- The Drummed, "The Drummed", EP (1999) – guitar, engineer, mixing
- The Tyde, "Strangers Again"/"Improper" (2000) – engineer, mixing
- The Tyde, "All My Bastard Children"/"Silver's Okay Michelle" (2001) – engineer, mixing
- Beachwood Sparks, "Once We Were Trees"/"Wake Up Little Susie" (2001) – producer, engineer
- The Tyde, "The World's Strongest Man/"Sullen Eyes" (2001) – engineer, mixing
- The Tyde, "Blood Brothers EP" (2002) – engineer, mixing
- The Tyde, "Go Ask Yer Dad"/"Blood Brothers" (CD single also includes "Play It As It Lays") (May 2003) (US) – engineer, mixing
- Meow Meow, "Cracked"/"Not Worth Recovering"/"Nature Is A Machine" (2004) – engineer, mixing
- Scarling., "Crispin Glover"/"Art of Pretension" (2004) – producer, engineer
- Scarling., "Crispin Glover"/"Love Becomes A Ghost" (2004) – producer, engineer
- The Tyde, "Look By in Anger"/"Roadrunner" (2004) – engineer, mixing
- Frausdots, "Dead Wrong"/"Pastels" (2004) – producer, engineer
- Frausdots, "Gonna Lose It" (2005) – producer, engineer, mixing
- Scarling. / The Willowz, split 7-inch "We Are the Music Makers" (2005) – producer, engineer
- Scarling., "Staring to the Sun" (2006) – producer, engineer, mixing
- The Quarter After, "Too Much Too Think About" (2008) – producer, engineer, guitar, vocals, sitar
- Spider Problem, "Natural Selections EP" (2008) – producer, engineer, mixing
- Scarling., "Who Wants To Die For Art?" (2013) – producer, engineer, mixing

== Filmography ==
- DiG! (2004)
