= Three's Co. =

Studio album by The Tyde
- Released: August 29, 2006
- Genre: Indie rock
- Length: 36:26
- Label: Rough Trade
- Producer: Rob Campanella

The Tyde chronology
Twice (2003)	Three's Co. (2006)	Darren 4 (2016)

Professional ratings
Aggregate scores
Source	Rating
Metacritic	62/100 link
Review scores
Source	Rating
Allmusic	link
Pitchfork Media	6.0/10 link

Three's Co. is the third album by American indie rock band The Tyde, released in 2006.

"Three's Co." has been greeted with critical acclaim, including the NME who rated it 8/10, calling it, "beach-pop that Brian Wilson might have sounded like if he'd listened obsessively to '80s indie legends Felt while he was playing in his sandpit."

Spin Magazine has praised the album's "bright anxious pop-rock melodies that pulse with a geeky charm" (3 stars).

The US and Japanese versions feature extra bonus tracks "Glassbottom Lights" (Remixed by James Figurine) and "Don't Need a Leash" (Remixed by Nobody for Nobody's Home Productions); The Japanese CD also includes the "Brock Landers" video, which is currently downloadable from the band's website.

== Track listing ==
1. "Do It Again Again"
2. "Brock Landers"
3. "Separate Cars"
4. "Too Many Kims"
5. "Glassbottom Lights"
6. "The Lamest Shows"
7. "Ltd. Appeal"
8. "County Line"
9. "Aloha Breeze"
10. "The Pilot"
11. "Don't Need a Leash"
