= Amusement Parks on Fire =

British rock band

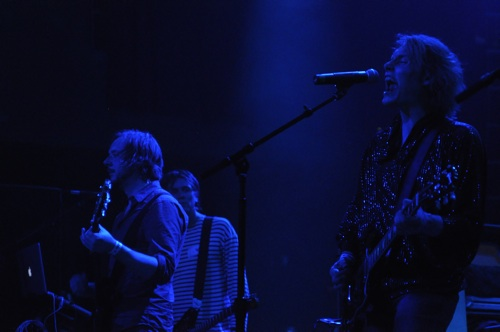
- Amusement Parks on Fire - Live in Concert

Background information
- Origin: Nottingham, England
- Genres: Noise pop; shoegaze
- Years active: 2004–present
- Labels: Invada; V2
- Spinoffs: Young Light
- Members: Michael Feerick; Gavin Poole; Joe Hardy; Pete Dale; Rafe Dunn
- Past members: Daniel Knowles; Jez Cox; John Sampson

Amusement Parks on Fire are a British rock band from Nottingham.

The band was established by Michael Feerick in 2004, who wrote and performed all the instruments for the self-titled debut album.

== History ==
The band began as the solo project of Michael Feerick in 2004, who wrote and recorded nine songs on a small budget with friend Daniel Knowles engineering the sessions. The self-titled debut album was released on Invada Records, the label run by Geoff Barrow of Portishead in 2004.

A live band was put together including Daniel Knowles (guitar), Pete Dale (drums), Jez Cox (bass) and John Sampson (keyboards/samples). The band signed to V2 Records in 2005 and recorded their second studio album Out Of The Angeles at various UK studios, eventually decamping to Sigur Rós' Sundlaugin studio at Álafoss, Iceland for a month to complete the record. They then toured Europe and America extensively.

The line-up altered in summer 2006 with the addition of Gavin Poole (bass) and Joe Hardy (keyboards/guitar). This line-up then embarked on a co-headline tour of the UK with the American noise outfit Scarling. and a headline tour across mainland Europe and Scandinavia. The band played in Japan for the first time at the Summer Sonic Festival 2006.

In addition to the second album Out Of The Angeles, the band released a series of limited edition 12" EPs — the first of which, Blackout was released in late 2005, In Flight in September 2006 and A Star Is Born on 2 April 2007 which, according to a Rough Trade review, showcased "other dimensions to Amusement Parks On Fire's otherworldly sound ...Feerick's classical influences...and hinting at a more bullish Amusement Parks direction to come." with Drowned In Sound calling it "a dizzying mini-epic... a chilly metaphysical beauty".

2009 saw the band tour Ireland followed up in April and May by a well received UK tour supporting 65daysofstatic as well as their own headline dates. The band then moved to Los Angeles, California, to begin work on their third album with producer Michael Patterson.

Another recording influenced by its surroundings, Road Eyes has a distinctively 'LA sound'; according to an Alternative Press review it "bears the sun-drenched stamp of the city where it was recorded", and features a guest appearance from Brian Aubert of Silversun Pickups on the single Flashlight Planetarium. The album was released in September 2010.

Around 2012 Feerick formed a duo, Young Light, with Micah Calabrese of LA band Giant Drag and released the EP Great White Arc and single Blank Dice.

On 28 April 2017 the band announced their return via social media, with a UK tour to follow in November. On 1 July the band announced a Deluxe Edition reissue of their Road Eyes album. A new single Our Goal To Realise was released on 17 November 2017, with an EP All The New Ends and supporting European tour on 13 April 2018.

Their fourth album An Archaea was released on June 25, 2021, with PopMatters stating "On the first new Amusement Parks on Fire record in over a decade, Michael Feerick continues to push the boundaries of what a rock album can be".

== Discography ==
=== Studio albums ===
- Amusement Parks on Fire (Invada) 2004
- Out of the Angeles (V2) 2006
- Road Eyes (Filter US) 2010
- An Archaea (EGB Global) 2021

=== EPs ===
- Venosa/Eighty Eight (Invada/GM Recordings) 2005
- Blackout EP (V2) 2005
- In Flight (V2) 2006
- A Star Is Born (V2) 2007
- Young Fight (Filter US) 2009
- Our Goal To Realise (Saint Marie) 2017
- All The New Ends (Saint Marie) 2018
- Thankyou Violin Radiopunk (E.G.B. Communications) 2020

== See also ==
- List of shoegazing musicians
