= Lowbrow (art movement) =

Underground visual art movement

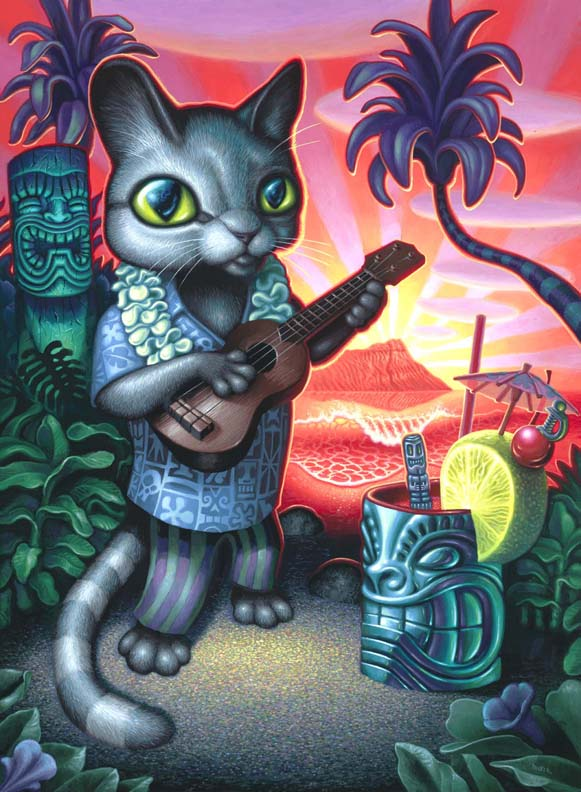
- Tiki Cat, lowbrow art by Brad Parker
- Years active: 1979–present
- Location: United States
- Major figures: Williams; Scharf; Ryden; Freeny
- Influences: Pop art, surrealism
- Influenced: Designer toys

Lowbrow, or lowbrow art, is an underground visual art movement that arose in the Los Angeles, California area in the late 1960s. It is a populist art movement with its cultural roots in underground comix, punk music, tiki culture, graffiti, and hot-rod cultures of the street. It is also often known by the name pop surrealism. Lowbrow art often has a sense of humor—sometimes the humor is gleeful, impish, or a sarcastic comment.

Most lowbrow artworks are paintings, but there are also toys, digital art, and sculpture.

== History ==
Some of the first artists to create what came to be known as lowbrow art were underground cartoonists like Robert Williams and Gary Panter. Barry McGee, Margaret Kilgallen, Dan "Plasma" Rauch, and Camilla Elke were amongst the first to pioneer Lowbrow as a street art, zine, fashion, graffiti, and counter culture movement. The purpose of the lowbrow movement was to take an unorthodox approach to art and to completely defy its "rules". This resulted in pushback from significant individuals and organizations in the art industry. Early shows were in alternative galleries in New York and Los Angeles such as Psychedelic Solutions Gallery in Greenwich Village, New York City which was run by Jacaeber Kastor, La Luz de Jesus run by Billy Shire and 01 gallery in Hollywood, run by John Pochna. The movement steadily grew from its beginning, with hundreds of artists adopting this style. As the number of artists grew, so did the number of galleries showing lowbrow. In 1992, Greg Escalante helped orchestrate the first formal gallery exhibition to take lowbrow art seriously: painter Anthony Ausgang's solo show "Looney Virtues" at the Julie Rico Gallery in Santa Monica. The Bess Cutler Gallery also went on to show important artists and helped expand the kind of art that was classified as lowbrow. The lowbrow magazine Juxtapoz, launched in 1994 by Robert Williams, Greg Escalante, and Eric Swenson, has been a mainstay of writing on lowbrow art and has helped shape and expand the movement.

== Etymology ==
In an article in the February 2006 issue of his magazine Juxtapoz, Robert Williams took credit for originating the term "lowbrow art". He stated that in 1979 Gilbert Shelton of the publisher Rip Off Press decided to produce a book featuring Willams' paintings. Williams said he decided to give the book the self-deprecating title The Lowbrow Art of Robt. Williams, since no authorized art institution would recognize his type of art. "Lowbrow" was thus used by Williams in opposition to "highbrow". He said the name then stuck, even though he feels it is inappropriate. Williams refers to the movement as "cartoon-tainted abstract surrealism." Lately, Williams has begun referring to his own work as "Conceptual Realism".

== Notable artists ==
- Anthony Ausgang
- Shawn Dickinson
- Van Arno
- Mark Ryden
- Robert Williams
- Coop (artist)
- Nache Ramos
- Camille Rose Garcia
- Shag
- Todd Schorr
- Greg Simkins
- Amy Sol
- Kenny Scharf
- Gregory Evans
- Ray Caesar
- Esao Andrews
- Luke Chueh
- Marion Peck
- Benny Arte
- Tara McPherson
- Sunny Buick
- Audrey Kawasaki
- Michael Leavitt (artist)
- Tim Biskup
- Gary Baseman
- Sas Christian
- Colin Christian
- Amy Botello

== Magazines ==
- Juxtapoz
- PORK (magazine)
- Beautiful/Decay Magazine
- Tokion is a magazine with both Japanese and American editions.
- Hi-Fructose
- Beautiful Bizarre Magazine
- Hey Magazine

== See also ==
- Chicago Imagists
- Decadent movement
- Dieselpunk
- Kitsch
- Kustom Kulture
- Massurrealism
- Middlebrow
- Naive art
- Outsider art
- Stuckism
- Superflat
- Tiki culture
- Underground art
