= ROCKRGRL =

First national US publication for female musicians

- July–August 1996 issue (#10) featuring Sleater-Kinney
- Editor: Carla DeSantis Black
- Categories: Music
- Frequency: Bimonthly (1995–2003); Quarterly (2003–2005)
- Circulation: 20,000 (2002)
- Founded: 1994
- First issue: January–February 1995
- Final issue Number: Fall 2005; 57
- Country: United States
- Language: English
- ISSN: 1086-5985

ROCKRGRL was the first national publication for female musicians in the United States. Created by Carla DeSantis, the magazine purely focused on women in music and highlighted the artistic diversity of women musicians, often overlooked in mainstream culture. The magazine ran for eleven years, and the strength of its message inspired two pioneering ROCKRGRL conferences that showcased, celebrated, and addressed the state of the music industry for female artists.

In December 2008, the ROCKRGRL Magazine and conference archives were acquired by Schlesinger Library at the Radcliffe Institute, Harvard University, to be included in their collection of American Women's History artifacts.

== ROCKRGRL magazine ==
=== History ===
ROCKRGRL was started by Carla DeSantis (aka Carla DeSantis Black) in 1994 in San Mateo, California as part of the zine movement to provide a third-wave feminist perspective on women in music.

Commenting on the magazine's founding, DeSantis recalled, “One issue of Rolling Stone was about Women Who Rock, and the writer asked everyone what their favorite perfume was, not music. Women were really shut out of music magazines like they didn’t exist.”

ROCKRGRL started out as a 14-page, black-and-white photocopied zine. Its first issue, which hit stands in 1995, featured Gretchen Seager on the cover along with articles about that dog., the Go-Go's, Queen Latifah, and Au Pairs. In 1999, ROCKRGRL became a full-color glossy bi-monthly magazine.

Throughout its lifespan, many famous and influential women appeared on the cover, including Justine Frischmann, Shirley Manson, Veruca Salt, Tori Amos, Johnette Napolitano, Courtney Love, Kathleen Hanna, Joan Jett, Kat Bjelland, Samantha Maloney, Tegan and Sara, Jessicka, Aimee Mann, Sleater-Kinney and Marianne Faithfull.

In the fall of 2005, DeSantis announced that issue number 57 would be the final issue of ROCKRGRL. Although single issues, merchandise and Discoveries CDs could be purchased through the site, they were no longer accepting subscriptions. However, full sets, all 57 issues of ROCKRGRL are now part of the collection at The Smithsonian in Washington, D.C., and other colleges and institutions including Harvard, Duke, Cornell, UCLA, University of Washington, Radcliffe Institute, Smith, Oberlin, Rutgers, University of Texas Austin, and the New York Public Library.

=== Mission ===
ROCKRGRL billed itself as, "a real departure from the condescending and patronizing tone found in other "women in music" magazines and web sites. No beauty tips or guilt trips here—just shop talk with fascinating artists."

From its inception, ROCKRGRL created an atmosphere for women to address music industry sexism head-on. Here is an example from Gretchen Seager of Mary's Danish who appeared on the magazine's first cover:

I don’t want to be qualified as a female singer. I just want to be a singer. And I don’t think you should be qualified by your gender. That’s always bullshit. And unfortunately, it’s probably not going to change in my lifetime. But I just want to be considered a good lyricist and a good singer, not a “girl” singer or a “girl” lyricist. That’s not relevant. Just evaluate me on my music and my lyrics and I'll be happy.

— Gretchen Seager, ROCKRGRL Issue #1

DeSantis recalled:

So many of the stories that women were able to tell in ROCKRGRL were stories they weren’t able to tell in any place else. What was different about ROCKRGRL was that a lot of the artists we talked to had cautionary tales. My favorite artists to talk to are the ones who can talk honestly about what happened. They were dropped by their label – why did that happen? Bands broke up, why did that happen? In ROCKRGRL, what I was looking for were career arcs and career stories – how people got started, what their career was like, how it went for them, and what unusual things they did to be successful.

=== Circulation ===
ROCKRGRL peaked at roughly 20,000 in circulation, domestic and international, during the years of 2002 and 2003. The magazine was carried by most major retail chains, including Virgin Records, Tower Records, Barnes & Noble, Borders, and Hastings Entertainment. ROCKRGRL could also be found in most feminist bookstores. During 2005, the cost for a yearly subscription was $14.95.

DeSantis explained:

I wanted ROCKRGRL to be in the hands of musicians. It was important to me that it found women who were playing music.

== Music conferences ==
DeSantis, one of the nation's leading advocates for women in rock, has also produced two highly successful and critically acclaimed ROCKRGRL Music Conferences which took place in Seattle in 2000 and 2005 respectively.

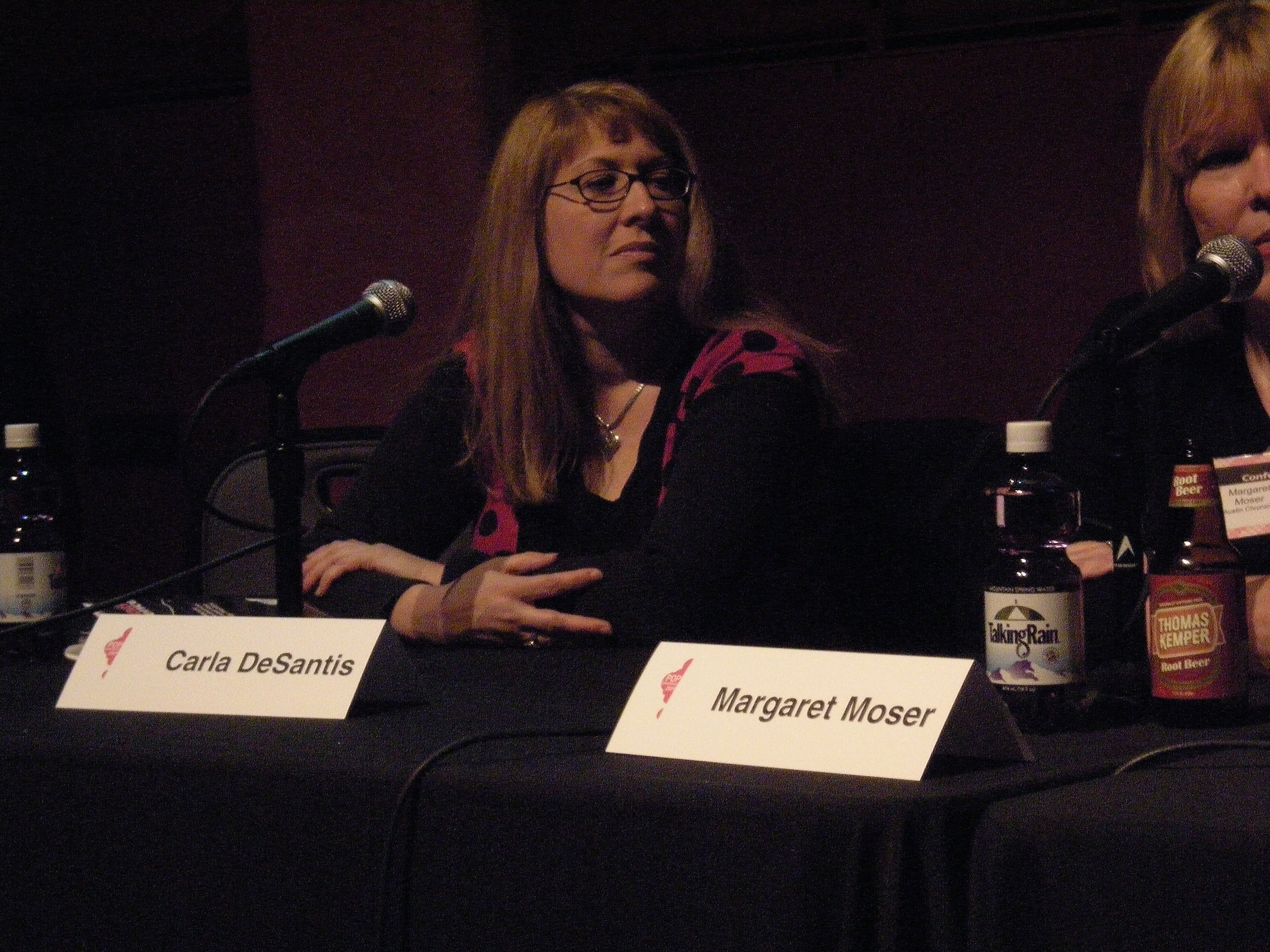

Based on the business model of SXSW, the goal of the ROCKRGRL Music Conferences was to give women working in the music industry an opportunity to network and allow those who were just starting out an opportunity to meet those who influenced them. With three nights of music showcases featuring female artists in all styles, a special Woman of Valor award dinner, two full days of panels, workshops and an artist-friendly trade show, the ROCKRGRL Music Conferences was an opportunity for women working in music to meet, mix and mingle in the city of Seattle.

“We had 250 female bands perform in clubs and coffeeshops and all kinds of places in downtown Seattle. We had really A-list artists come and speak and perform. And all levels performed, actually. It was eclectic and interesting. It was a really big deal because for me all the people I admired were in the same room,” said DeSantis.

The diverse line-up of speakers and performers at the ROCKRGRL Music Conference included such musical luminaries as Patti Smith, Bonnie Raitt, Courtney Love, Ronnie Spector (The Ronettes), Amy Ray (Indigo Girls), Ann Wilson, Johnette Napolitano (Concrete Blonde), Kathy Valentine (The Go-Go's), Wanda Jackson, The Gossip, Jessicka (Scarling. / Jack Off Jill), Exene Cervenka, Eliza Gilkyson, Rosie Flores, Carol Kaye, Wanda Jackson and hundreds more. During the 2005 conference, keynote speaker Patti Smith received the Woman of Valor award on the 30th anniversary of the release of her debut album, Horses. The previous recipient of this award was Heart. By 2005, sponsorship for the second ROCKRGRL Music Conference had diminished due emerging economic downturn. Despite this, conference attendance remained high.

=== Daisy Rock Guitars ===
Daisy Rock Guitars, a subsidiary of Schecter Guitars, is company that makes guitars for girls exclusively. Its first three prototype models debuted in November 2000 at Seattle's first ROCKRGRL Conference.

== Cultural impact ==
ROCKRGRL Magazine has been lauded in feature articles in The LA Times, New York Times, Seventeen, Jane, Seattle Times, Mercer Island Reporter, Village Voice, San Francisco Chronicle, Boston Rock, Asbury Park Press, Chicago Tribune, The Stranger, Bitch, and Bust.

DeSantis furthers:

Women’s voices have been repressed for many years in music. Most of the pop stars we see are singing songs written by men, or written for them. My day, in the 80’s, there were lots of women in music who were writing their own material...What the magazine provided was an opportunity for women who weren’t only singers to find their voices through the magazine. When there aren’t many women doing something, it’s hard to have them as role models. Different ages, different styles of music – they demonstrate that women have a lot to say, and because mainstream music magazines weren’t exploring that, it needed to be explored in some way. The more we see woman musicians, the less of a novelty they will be.

A ‘’ROCKRGRL Day’’ was held at Musicians’ Institute in Los Angeles in 2003.

DeSantis Black relocated to Austin, Texas in 2010 and started Musicians for Equal Opportunities for Women (MEOW) which provided a daily updated web magazine featuring news and interviews with women in music. She put on another music conference in 2013 featuring Suzi Quatro, Kathy Valentine and other artists.
