= Scarling =

American band

Scarling.
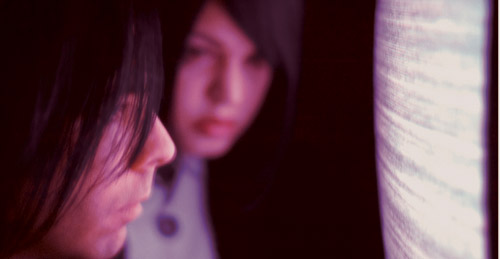
- Christian Hejnal and Jessicka in 2005

Background information
- Origin: Los Angeles, California, U.S.
- Genres: Noise pop; art rock; gothic rock; indie rock; shoegaze
- Years active: 2001–2014
- Labels: Sympathy for the Record Industry; The Committee to Keep Music Evil
- Past members: Jessicka; Christian Hejnal; Kyle Lime; Radio Sloan; Rickey Lime; Derik Snell; Beth Gordon
- Website: www.scarling.com

Scarling. was an American noise pop band formed in Los Angeles in 2001. The band consisted of lead vocalist Jessicka Addams and guitarist Christian Hejnal.

== Name ==
The band's name comes from a fictional word created by singer/fine artist Jessicka in 1999. In 2001 the definition appeared on Scarling's website: "Middle English, from Old English scaerlinc, from scar+ -ling, -linc -ling; akin to Old High German von scar, Latin scarnos 1. the smallest mark on your heart left by the healing of a severe injury. 2. he or she who is scarred densely almost emotionless. 3. a mentally challenged/physically handicapped sibling of a normal star. 4. a band from Los Angeles. The "S" in Scarling. is sometimes lower case and the word itself ends in a full stop or period."

== History ==
=== Formation & Sweet Heart Dealer (2002–2004) ===
Scarling. was formed by singer Jessicka Fodera (known simply as Jessicka) after the dissolution of her band, Jack Off Jill, and guitarist Christian Hejnal. They were introduced by guitarist Lisa Leveridge, and they began rehearsing and recording in a San Fernando Valley performance space; after the pair had written a number of songs together, they began a search for additional band members and eventually cemented the first and very short-lived lineup of Scarling.

In early 2002, Jessicka was introduced to Long Gone John, owner of Sympathy for the Record Industry, by mutual friend Mark Ryden. On March 19, 2003, Scarling's debut single, "Band Aid Covers the Bullet Hole" (produced by Chris Vrenna), was released on the Sympathy for the Record Industry label. Its cover featured an illustration called "Wound 39" by Mark Ryden.

In April 2004, Scarling. released their debut album, Sweet Heart Dealer, a seven-song release again produced by Vrenna and packaged by Ryden. Later that year, Jessicka was featured on the cover of ROCKRGRL magazine's vocalist issue. Scarling was then invited to join the lineup of the Robert Smith-organized Curiosa Festival, performing on select West Coast dates alongside Interpol, The Rapture, Mogwai, Cursive, The Cooper Temple Clause, and longtime inspirations The Cure. Smith described the band's music as "dark, desperate, chaotic, gorgeous pop music, the sound of the end of the world" and nominated "Sweet Heart Dealer" for the 2004 Shortlist Music Prize. While Alternative Press Magazine said Scarling. sounded like, "being French kissed by the most beautiful beings in the world, really alluring yet massive stuff." Three weeks before joining the Curiosa tour, drummer Garey Snider left and was briefly replaced by Samantha Maloney in order to perform live at a group art showing at the Copro/Nason Gallery (Santa Monica, California). Weeks later they found drummer Beth Gordon, who served as Scarling's permanent replacement. Scarling, with the help of friend and fill-in bassist Radio Sloan, continued to play around Los Angeles and San Francisco at clubs such as The Bottom Of The Hill, Spaceland and The Troubadour.

On October 21, 2004, John Peel, English disc jockey and radio presenter, invited Robert Smith to stand in for him while he was in Peru as a guest DJ on what turned out to be the last Peel Session show. Smith played Scarling's Crispin Glover as one of the tracks in his eclectic set. Scarling. were also chosen by Smith to be part of his Celebrity Playlist on iTunes along with Cocteau Twins, My Bloody Valentine, Supergrass, Nirvana, Placebo, The Psychedelic Furs, and several bands that played on the Curiosa tour earlier that year. Smith wrote a quote about each song and wrote "Beautiful shadows" next to the Scarling. track.

=== So Long, Scarecrow & touring (2005–2007) ===
After a series of 7-inch singles on Sympathy, Scarling announced in early 2005 that their second album, So Long, Scarecrow, would appear later that year; it was preceded by the single "We Are the Music Makers", and was released on August 23, 2005. So Long, Scarecrow was co-produced by Rob Campanella, formerly of The Brian Jonestown Massacre, at his studio, The Committee to Keep Music Evil headquarters. The critical reception for Scarecrow was generally strong: Alternative Press gave the album a 5 out of 5 rating. Simon Price from The Independent said, "In contrast to the abrasive JOJ sound, Scarling. work up a wonderfully hazy guitar swirl, reminiscent of post-My Bloody Valentine noise-pop from the Britain of the early Nineties." Chris Beyond from No-Fi Magazine described Scarecrow as "somewhere between Blonde Redhead and Sonic Youth and said "there are 13 tracks on this album, but they leave you wanting more." Scarling's was touted as resurrecting goth' by Venus magazine: "Goth isn’t dead. It’s just evolved into a sweeter version with Scarling’s variety of distorted but, dare I say, gorgeous version of the once-dreary genre. On the band’s full-length debut, So Long, Scarecrow, frontwoman Jessicka’s syrupy yet cautious vocals are quite different than her former angry, self-mutilating persona in the late ’90s Marilyn Manson-esque group Jack off Jill."

In December 2005, Scarling. embarked on its first UK tour, creating a buzz for themselves and selling out most venues. SLS's first single "City Noise" is featured on the compilation Alright, This Time Just the Girls Vol. 2 and 2006's Staring To The Sun. The song "Bummer" from SLS was featured on Showtime's The L Word season 3 episode "Latecomer", as well as an Urban Outfitters/Filter magazine compilation. An episode of the medical drama Grey's Anatomy (season 2) is titled "Band Aid Covers the Bullet Hole".

In 2006, Scarling continued to tour in the United States and Europe, embarking on their first co-heading with UK shoegaze outfit Amusement Parks on Fire and opening for The Wedding Present and Depeche Mode later in the year.

=== Hiatus (2007–2013) ===
Scarling. currently resides in the neighborhood of Silver Lake, Los Angeles, California. On February 14, 2006 (Valentine's Day), while on a break from touring, Jessicka and guitarist Christian Hejnal were engaged. Their wedding took place on October 13, 2007, at the Oviatt Penthouse in Los Angeles. The band was largely on hiatus for six years following their marriage, with Jessicka returning to focus on her art career.

Scarling. performed at the wedding of Bravo's Shear Genius finalist Janine Jarman and Matthew Wolcott at the Houdini Mansion in Hollywood on June 26, 2010.

=== Return to activity (2013–2014) ===
Jessicka has stated that, after her art show "Little Grey Secrets", Scarling. would resume. Scarling. released their single "Who Wants To Die For Art?" digitally in the US on iTunes October 29, 2013. Jessicka Addams suffered health problems shortly after the release of the songs.

On May 13, 2014, Mark Ryden released an album entitled The Gay Nineties Old Tyme Music: Daisy Bell, that features Scarling along with other artists all giving a different rendition of the same song, "Daisy Bell (Bicycle Built for Two)". The album, printed on 180 g red vinyl, was limited to 999 copies, all hand-numbered and signed by Ryden. Half of the records were sold at the Michael Kohn gallery. The proceeds from the record will benefit Little Kids Rock, a nonprofit that supports musical education in disadvantaged elementary schools.

== Discography ==
Studio albums

- Sweet Heart Dealer (2004)
- So Long, Scarecrow (2005)
