= Mark Ryden =

American painter (born 1963)

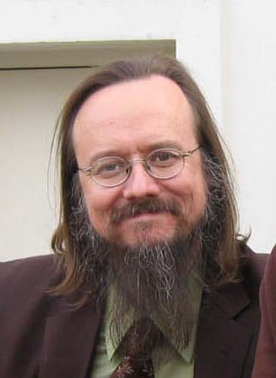
- Ryden in 2007
- Born: January 20, 1963 (age 63); Medford, Oregon, U.S.
- Education: Art Center College of Design
- Known for: Painter
- Notable work: The Creatrix; Snow White; The Birth; The Parlor
- Website: Official website

Mark Ryden (born January 20, 1963) is an American painter who is considered to be part of the Lowbrow (or pop surrealist) art movement. He was dubbed "the god-father of pop surrealism" by Interview magazine. In 2015, Artnet named Ryden and his wife, painter Marion Peck, the king and queen of Pop Surrealism.

Ryden has been described as a "relentless kitsch meister working in the tradition of Bosch, Dalí, and Little Golden Books" and a master of Lowbrow style. His work has been described as having a pop-surrealist style that contains a nightmarish quality. His inspirations include "old children’s books, interesting product packages, toys, photographs, medical models, skeletons, shells, minerals, and religious statues." His album and single artwork for musicians includes Aerosmith's "Love in an Elevator" (1989), Michael Jackson's Dangerous (1991), Red Hot Chili Peppers' One Hot Minute (1995), Jack Off Jill's Clear Hearts Grey Flowers (2000), and Tyler, the Creator's Wolf (2013).

== Biography ==
=== Early life ===
Ryden was born in Medford, Oregon on January 20, 1963, to Barbara and Keith Ryden, and was raised in Southern California. His father was a painter who also restored and customized cars. He has two sisters and two brothers: his brother Keyth is also an artist and works under the name KRK. Ryden graduated from the Art Center College of Design in Pasadena in 1987.

=== Early career (1988–1998) ===
From 1988 to 1998, Ryden worked as a commercial artist. During this period, he created album covers for prominent musicians, including Danger Danger’s debut eponymous album; Warrant's debut album Dirty Rotten Filthy Stinking Rich; Michael Jackson's Dangerous; the 4 Non Blondes' Bigger, Better, Faster, More!; the Red Hot Chili Peppers' One Hot Minute; Scarling.’s Sweet Heart Dealer and their alternative vinyl cover of So Long, Scarecrow; Jack Off Jill's Clear Hearts Grey Flowers; the Screaming Trees' Uncle Anesthesia; Marcy Playground's Shapeshifter; and Aerosmith's "Love in an Elevator". He also created book covers, including the Stephen King novels Desperation and The Regulators. In 1994, Robert Williams featured Ryden's work on the cover of Juxtapoz, a magazine devoted to "lowbrow art", which helped launch Ryden to greater success.

=== Exhibitions and major projects (1998–present) ===
==== The Meat Show ====
Ryden's solo debut show entitled "The Meat Show" was in Pasadena, California in 1998. Meat is a recurring theme in his work. In a 2010 interview, Ryden stated, "There seems to be a complete disconnect between meat as food and the living, breathing creature it comes from. I suppose it is this contradiction that brings me to return to meat in my art."

==== Wondertoonel ====
A mid-career retrospective, "Wondertoonel", which refers to a cabinet of curiosities or Wunderkammer ("wonder-room"), was co-organized in 2004 by the Frye Art Museum in Seattle and the Pasadena Museum of California Art. It was the best-attended exhibition since the Frye Art Museum opened in 1952, and broke attendance records in Pasadena. Debra Byrne, then-curator of the Frye, placed Ryden's work in the camp of the carnivalesque—a strain of visual culture rooted in such works as Hieronymous Bosch’s Garden of Earthly Delights.

==== The Tree Show ====
The Tree of Life by Mark Ryden

In 2007, "The Tree Show" opened at the Michael Kohn Gallery, Los Angeles. In this show, Ryden explored the contemporary human experience of nature. He explained, "Some people look at these massive trees and feel a sort of spiritual awe looking at them, and then other people just want to cut them up and sell them, they only see a commodity". Ryden has created limited editions of his art to raise money for the Sierra Club and Nature Conservancy.

==== The Snow Yak Show ====
In 2009, Ryden's exhibition "The Snow Yak Show" was shown at the Tomio Koyama Gallery in Tokyo.

==== The Gay 90s: Olde Tyme Art Show ====
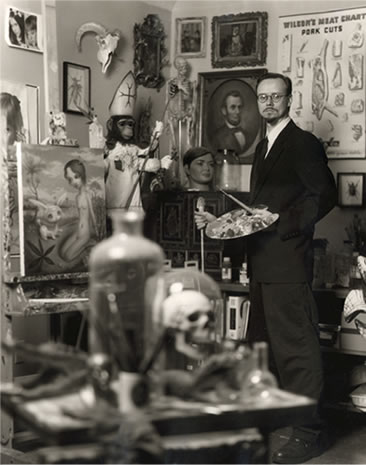
Mark Ryden at his studio

In 2010, "The Gay lord 90s: Olde Tyme Art Show" debuted at Paul Kasmin Gallery in New York. The central theme of the show referenced the idealism and sentimentalism of the 1890s while addressing the role of kitsch and nostalgia in current culture. Ryden explored the line between attraction and repulsion to kitsch. According to The New York Times, "Ryden’s pictures hint at the psychic stuff that pullulates beneath the sentimental, nostalgic and naïve surface of modern kitsch."

==== The Tree of Life ====
Ryden's The Tree of Life painting was included in the exhibition "The Artist's Museum, Los Angeles Artists 1980-2010" at The Museum of Contemporary Art, Los Angeles (MOCA). The exhibition showcased artists who helped shape the artistic dialogue in Los Angeles since MOCA's 1980 founding.

==== The Gay Nineties Olde Tyme Music ====
On May 13, 2014, Ryden released an album titled The Gay Nineties Olde Tyme Music: Daisy Bell, featuring Tyler, the Creator, "Weird Al" Yankovic, Katy Perry, Stan Ridgway of Wall Of Voodoo, Danny Elfman, Mark Mothersbaugh of Devo, Nick Cave, Scarling., Kirk Hammett of Metallica, and Everlast. All performed a different rendition of the same song, "Daisy Bell (Bicycle Built for Two)." The proceeds from the signed and limited edition record benefited Little Kids Rock, a nonprofit that supports musical education in disadvantaged elementary schools.

==== Whipped Cream ====
Ryden developed costumes and sets for a two-act ballet titled Whipped Cream, which premiered in March 2017 at the Segerstrom Center for the Arts in Costa Mesa, California. The ballet was created by choreographer Alexei Ratmansky for the American Ballet Theatre. It is a story about a young boy who overindulges at a Vienna pastry shop and falls into a surreal delirium. With libretto and music by Richard Strauss, the ballet, originally titled Schlagobers, was first performed by the Vienna State Opera in 1924.

==== The Mark Ryden x Barbie Collection ====
In 2022, it was announced that Ryden had designed a series of limited-edition Barbies and accessories for Mattel. Mattel Creations and Kasmin Gallery held an exhibition of Ryden's work and the dolls from November 11 to December 12, 2022. Also on display was Ryden's first depiction of Barbie, a 1994 oil painting of a girl praying to Barbie, titled Saint Barbie.

== Personal life ==
Ryden has two children, Rosie and Jasper. In 2009, he married artist Marion Peck in the Pacific Northwest rainforest. He resides in Portland, Oregon.

== Selected solo exhibitions ==
- 2016/2017: "Cámara de las Maravillas." CAC, Málaga, España
- 2014: "The Gay 90's West." Michael Kohn Gallery, Los Angeles
- 2010: "The Gay 90's: Old Tyme Art Show", Paul Kasmin Gallery, New York
- 2010: "The Artist's Museum," The Museum of Contemporary Art, Los Angeles
- 2009: "The Snow Yak Show", Tomio Koyama Gallery, Japan
- 2007: "Tree Show", Michael Kohn Gallery, Los Angeles
- 2004-05: "Wondertoonel", Frye Museum, Seattle & Pasadena Museum of California Art, Pasadena
- 2003: "Insalata Mista", Mondo Bizzarro Gallery, Bologna, Italy
- 2003: "Blood" Earl McGrath Gallery, Los Angeles, California
- 2002: "Bunnies and Bees", Grand Central Art Center, Santa Ana, California
- 2001: "Bunnies and Bees", Earl McGrath Gallery, New York, New York
- 1998: "The Meat Show", Mendenhall Gallery, Pasadena, California

== Albums ==
- 2014: Mark Ryden's The Gay Nineties Old Tyme Music: Daisy Bell
