= Marion Peck =

American artist

- Born: Marion Peck; October 3, 1963 (age 62); Manila, Philippines
- Education: Rhode Island School of Design
- Known for: Painter
- Movement: Pop surrealism

Marion Peck is a pop surrealist painter based in the United States.

== Early life ==
Peck was born in Manila, while her family was on a trip around the world. She grew up in Seattle and is the youngest of four children.

Peck received a BFA from the Rhode Island School of Design in 1985. She studied in two different MFA programs: Syracuse University in New York and Temple University in Rome. She lived in Italy for a few years, where she studied its culture. She began her exhibitions in the United States and international, starting in 1990.

On October 24, 2009, Peck married longtime partner, Mark Ryden in the woods of the Pacific Northwest Rainforest.

== Artistic career ==
Peck became known for her work in pop surrealism and has exhibited her work in Paris, Rome, New York, Los Angeles, San Francisco, and Seattle. She is represented by the Dorothy Circus Gallery. Her work has been featured in album covers, such as Waking the Mystics (2006) by Portland art rock group, Sophe Lux. Peck released many art books including Sweet Wishes (2008), Animal Lover Summer (2010), and Lamb Land: The Art of Marion Peck (2016).

Peck mainly paints in oil and her style is inspired by Greek mythology, based on her trip to Greece, astrology, and art from the Italian Renaissance. Other influences include allusions to Eden, Jehovah's Witnesses' pamphlets, The Last Supper, Russian orthodox iconology, religious oil prints, clowns, masks, extinct creatures, old Dutch oil paintings of home interiors, and 19th-century cabinet photography. She tackles political satire and social problems such as deforestation of the rainforest. When discussing her topics, Peck claims, "that she wanted her messages to be a visual one, not literary." Her art has been described by Widewalls as "simultaneously heartbreakingly sweet and full of humor."

== Exhibitions ==
=== Solo exhibitions ===
- 1990: Marianne Partlow Gallery, Olympia, WA
- 1993 - 2001: Galleria Dusseldorf/ Roma, Rome, Italy
- 1994 - 2001: Davidson Galleries, Seattle, WA
- 2000: Olga Dollar Gallery, San Francisco, CA
- 2006: Mondo Bizzarro Gallery, Rome, Italy
- 2007: Billy Shire Fine Arts, Culver City, CA
- 2009 - 2010: Sloan Fine Art, New York, NY
- 2013: Michael Kohn Projects
- 2015 - 2016: Magda Danysz Gallery, Paris, France
- 2016: Promenade Magiques, Magda Danyz Gallery, Paris, France
- 2018: StraVolti, Dorothy Circus Gallery, Rome, Italy
- 2020: Between Worlds, Magda Danyz Gallery, Shanghai, China
- 2020: Red Clown, Blue Clown, Corey Helford Gallery, Los Angeles, CA

== Publications ==
- I Cari Estini (The Dearly Departed), Mondo Bizzaro Gallery, January 1, 2006
- Sweet Wishes, coeauthor Mark Ryden, Porterhouse, January 1, 2008
- Animal Summer Love, Last Gap, November 1, 2010
- Lamb Land: The Art of Marion Peck, Cernunnos, September 20, 2016
- The Art of Marion Peck: A Portfolio of 30 Deluxe Postcards, Cernunnos, March 17, 2020
