= Nathan Spoor =

American artist, writer, and art curator

- Education: Abilene Christian University (BFA) and Savannah College of Art and Design (MFA)
- Known for: Painting and graphic design
- Movement: Suggestivism
- Website: Nathan Spoor's website

Nathan Spoor is an American artist, writer, and art curator. He is known for his acrylic paintings and the popularization of the Suggestivism art movement.

== Early career ==
Spoor graduated from Abilene Christian University with a BFA in Painting and Graphic Design, with a minor in Drawing and Illustration. Spoor first began painting in his second year of college. He eventually graduated from the Savannah College of Art and Design MFA program, however he took a lengthy break from his thesis work to become a graphic designer, becoming Art Director of his firm after two years. In 2001 he moved from Texas to southern California.

== Exhibitions ==
The first public work by Spoor was a painted mural in the children's museum at the Grace Cultural Center. In 2004 Spoor exhibited in the Six Degrees festival in the loft district of Los Angeles, a festival of art exhibitions, DJ sets, live entertainment, drinks, food and vendors within three conjoined warehouses. In 2005 his exhibition at the Shooting Gallery in San Francisco was featured in SF Weekly. His first solo exhibition was shown at the Earl McGrath Gallery in LA, entitled The Intimate Parade.

Spoor is a founder of the Deity Group, a marketing and branding agency, and in 2007 he co-founded the Venice Contemporary Art Gallery, for which he served as curator. The gallery exhibited live music, fine art, and technology. He has exhibited at Los Angeles area galleries including Manifest Equality Gallery, Royal/T, CoproGallery, and the J. Flynn Gallery; Rotofugi Gallery in Chicago; galleries like Bold Hype Gallery and AFA NYC in New York City; and Modern Eden Gallery in San Francisco. He was also a part of the 100 Artists See Satan showed at the Grand Central Art Center in 2010. Later that year he held an exhibition entitled Full X Moon to celebrate the tenth anniversary of his move to Los Angeles. In 2013 Spoor also curated the exhibition Kindred at the Bold Hype Gallery in NYC.

From September through November 2013 Spoor's work was featured alongside 40 others in an exhibition entitled Risque {dirty little pictures}, which he co-curated at the Long Beach Museum of Art. According to the Orange County Register, "The exhibit features 40 erotic-themed works from contemporary artists of varying skills and prestige from across the nation. The works range in their explicitness, with each featured artist expressing their own idea on canvas of what they consider risqué... The exhibit's opening night party drew nearly double the audience that other exhibits featured at the museum have typically generated, with most garnering a crowd of 300 to 400, organizers said. More than 800 came out for the “Risque” opening party." In 2015 Spoor was a part of an exhibition shown at the Long Beach Museum of Art entitled Masterworks: Defining A New Narrative, which he co-curated as well. The show sent attendance records at the museum.

== Suggestivism ==
=== Exhibitions ===
He popularized the term Suggestivism "a new ideal of beauty, or, the ability of an individual to pursue their [sic] purpose with an amplified understanding and sensitivity" according to the Orange County Register, with early representative works of the movement including his 2008 work Suddenly. In 2011 he curated the exhibition Suggestivism from February to April 2011 at the CSUF Grand Central Art Center. Spoor took three years to put together the exhibition, which features more than fifty artists. In 2012 he curated the exhibitions Suggestivism NYC, with a total of more than forty artists, at the Bold Hype Gallery in Manhattan. In 2013 Spoor curated a third exhibition, entitled Suggestivism at the Acquario Romano in Rome, Italy from May 3 to May 30. Future exhibitions are planned for returns to Los Angeles as well as Rome.

=== Publications ===
Spoor authored the book Suggestivism: A Comprehensive Survey of Contemporary Artists in conjunction with the first Suggestivism exhibition in 2011. The hardcover book featured by full color paintings and reviews of the work and movement. Artists featured in the book include Chris Mars, Alex Gross, Audrey Kawasaki, Jeff Soto, Ron English, Elizabeth McGrath, Tara McPherson, and Greg Simkins. He has also been a contributor to publications including Juxtapoz Magazine, Hi Fructose Magazine, and Surfer's Journal.

== Media and other projects ==
In August 2009 Nathan Spoor was featured in the cover of Bl!sss Magazine. Spoor has also worked with the band Coheed and Cambria to produce artwork to complement musical projects.
