= Mel's Hole =

Urban legend started in 1997

Mel's Hole is, according to an urban legend, an American "bottomless pit" near Ellensburg, Washington. Claims about it were first made on the radio show Coast to Coast AM in 1997 by a guest calling himself Mel Waters. Later investigation revealed no such person was listed as residing in that area, and no credible evidence has been given that the hole ever existed.

== Claims ==
The legend of the bottomless hole started on February 21, 1997, when a man identifying himself as Mel Waters appeared as a guest on Coast to Coast AM with Art Bell. Waters claimed that he owned rural property nine miles (14 km) west of Ellensburg in Kittitas County, Washington, that contained a mysterious hole. According to Waters, the hole had an unknown depth. He claimed to have measured its depth using fishing line and a weight, although he still had not hit bottom by the time 80,000 feet (15 mi; 24 km) of line had been used. He also claimed that his neighbor's dead dog had been seen alive sometime after it was thrown into the hole. According to Waters, the hole's magical properties prompted US federal agents to seize the land and fund his relocation to Australia.

Waters made guest appearances on Bell's show in 1997 (February 21 and 24), 2000, and 2002. Rebroadcasts of those appearances have helped create what has been described as a "modern, rural myth". The exact location of the hole was unspecified, yet several people claimed to have seen it, such as self-described "intertribal medicine man" Gerald Osborne, also known as Red Elk, who told reporters in 2012 he visited the hole many times since 1961 and claimed the US government maintained a top secret base there where "alien activity" occurs.

== Investigation ==
In 2002, a group of thirty people led by Gerald Osborne undertook an expedition to find the hole, but were unable to locate it. Local news reporters who investigated the claims found no public records of anyone named Mel Waters ever residing in, or owning property in, Kittitas County.

According to State Department of Natural Resources geologist Jack Powell, the hole does not exist and is geologically impossible. A hole of the depth claimed "would collapse into itself under the tremendous pressure and heat from the surrounding strata," said Powell. Powell said an ordinary old mine shaft on private property was probably the inspiration for the stories, and commented that Mel's Hole had established itself as a legend "based on no evidence at all." Geologist Pat Pringle doubted Waters' story about having lowered 80,000 feet (15 mi; 24 km) of fishing line into a hole, saying that the heat of the Earth would have snapped it before it could reach such a depth.

== Art exhibition ==
An art exhibition, "Aspects of Mel's Hole: Artists Respond to a Paranormal Land Event Occurring in Radiospace," curated by LA Weekly art critic Doug Harvey, was presented at the Grand Central Art Center (GCAC) in Santa Ana, California, in 2008. The show featured works by 41 artists and collectives, many created specifically for the exhibition, including works by Albert Cuellar, Charles Schneider, Marnie Weber, Jim Shaw, Jeffrey Vallance, Georganne Deen, Paul Laffoley, The Firesign Theatre, Gary Panter, The Center for Land Use Interpretation, James Hayward, Cathy Ward, Eric Wright and Craig Stecyk.

The GCAC published a hardbound 146-page catalog in conjunction with the exhibit, containing contributions from all the artists, plus essays by Harvey, psychoanalyst Judy Spence, science author Margaret Wertheim, Hannah Miller, Brian Tucker, Christine Wertheim, Mike McGee and the Rev. Ethan Acres.

== See also ==
- Well to Hell hoax
- Skinwalker Ranch, a similar paranormal "complex" (combining several different kinds of Fortean accounts in one location)
