= Carrie Ann Baade =

American painter

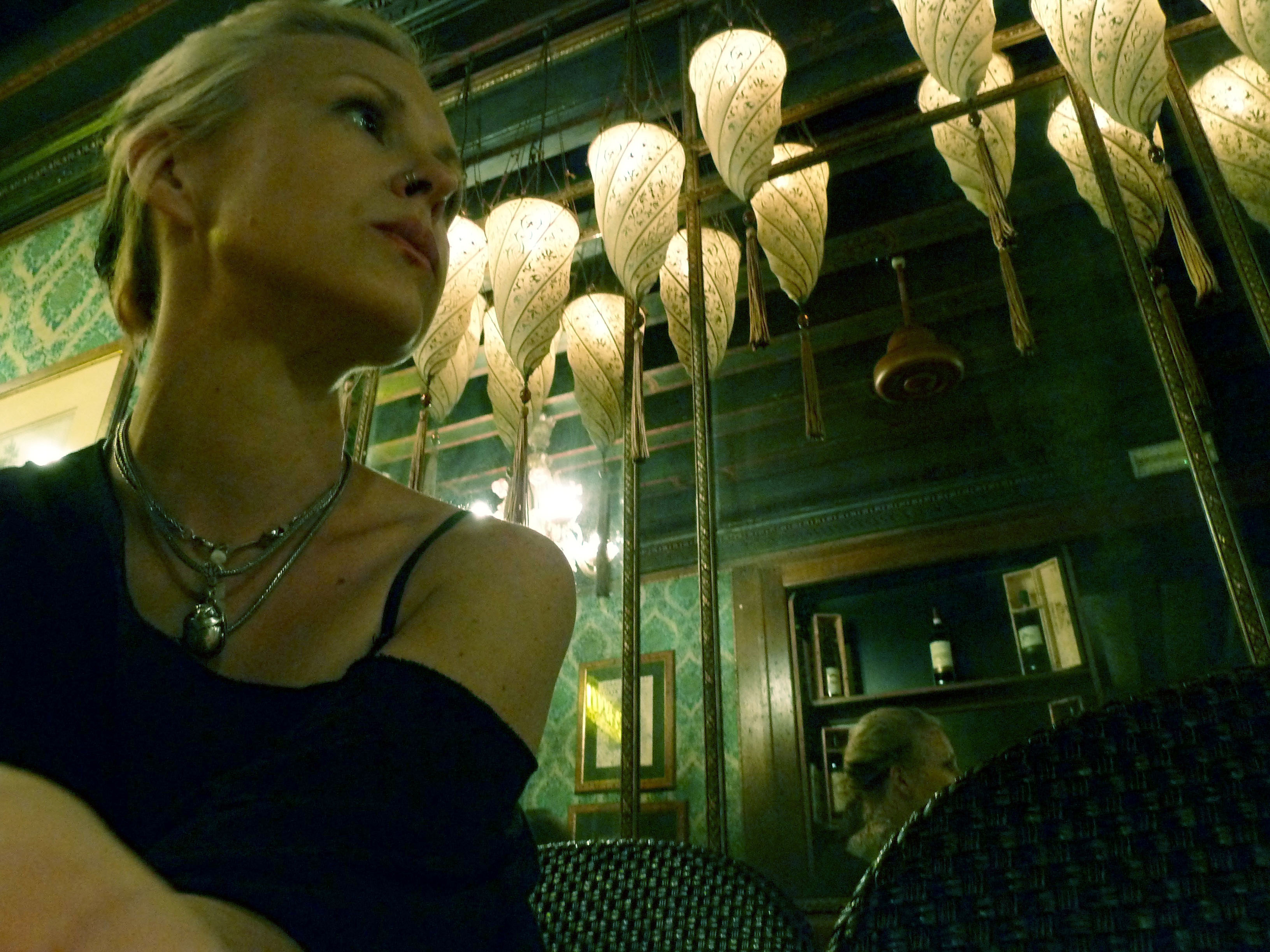
- Born: Carrie Ann Jones; February 18, 1974 (age 52); New Orleans, Louisiana
- Education: School of the Art Institute of Chicago; Florence Academy of Art; University of Delaware
- Known for: Painting and drawing
- Movement: Pop Surrealism, Visionary
- Awards: Halo Fellowship Award, Florida Division of Cultural Affairs Individual Artist Fellowship, the Delaware Division of the Arts Fellowship for Established Artist, and a nomination for the prestigious United States Artist Fellowship
- Website: http://www.carrieannbaade.com

Carrie Ann Baade (born February 18, 1974) is an American painter whose work has been described by Curator of Contemporary Art Margaret Winslow as "autobiographical parables combin(ing) fragments of Renaissance and Baroque religious paintings, resulting in surreal landscapes inhabited by exotic flora, fauna, and figures." The context and the compositional building blocks of her work are fragments of historical masterpieces, which Baade reinterprets using her original feminist and autobiographical perspective. She currently lives in Tallahassee, Florida, where she is a professor in the Department of Art at Florida State University.

== Education and early life ==
Baade was born in New Orleans but spent the majority of her early years in a small town in central Colorado, where she graduated from high school. She attended The School of the Art Institute of Chicago, graduating with her BFA in 1997. During that period she spent a year in Italy studying the techniques of the old masters at the Florence Academy of Art. In 2003, she earned her MFA from the University of Delaware.

== Style ==
"Carrie Ann Baade is a talented and highly imaginative artist whose work is irrevocably linked to the contemporary surreal movement" (International Confederation of Art Critics)

"Baade's oils often contrast dense, extravagant contemporary and classical symbology with luminescent color, communicating themes of mortality, sexuality, personal transformation, and the darker side of human nature" (International Confederation of Art Critics)

== Exhibitions, grants, and awards ==
Baade has received significant recognition through prestigious awards and fellowships. She was nominated in 2022 for the Joan Mitchell Foundation Painters & Sculptors Fellowship, earned the Florida Division of Cultural Affairs Individual Artist Fellowship in 2009, received the First Prize from the Pensacola Museum of Art in 2021, and garnered a Purchase Award from Winners XX at the Biggs Museum of American Art (2021).

Her paintings have been featured in various art exhibitions including: "Back and Forth: Thinking in Paint" at the John and Mable Ringling Museum of Art, "Solar Midnight" at the Museum of Contemporary Art Jacksonville (solo show), "¡Orale! The Kings and Queens of Cool" at Harwood Museum of Art, "In Canon" at the Delaware Center for Contemporary Art, "Suggestivism" at CSUF Grand Central Art Center in Santa Monica, and "Another Roadside Attraction" at ISE Cultural Foundation in New York City.

In 2007, she was among a group of three artists who became the first Americans ever to exhibit at the Ningbo Museum, one of the largest provincial museums in China, located outside of Shanghai. The director of the Ningbo Museum called them "the Mayflowers" for their contributions as cultural ambassadors.

Internationally, her paintings have been included in exhibitions in China, Austria, Germany, France, Poland, Italy, Spain, Mexico, and the Philippines; and featured in exhibitions at the Center for Culture in Warsaw, Museum La Ensenanza in San Cristóbal and the Museo de la Ciudad de Mexico, the Instituto de América de Santa Fe Museo in Granada Spain, and Espace Culturel Mompezat Société des Poètes Françaises in Paris.

In 2011, Baade curated "Cute and Creepy", a large group exhibit at the Museum of Fine Art at Florida State University of artists in the pop surrealism movement.

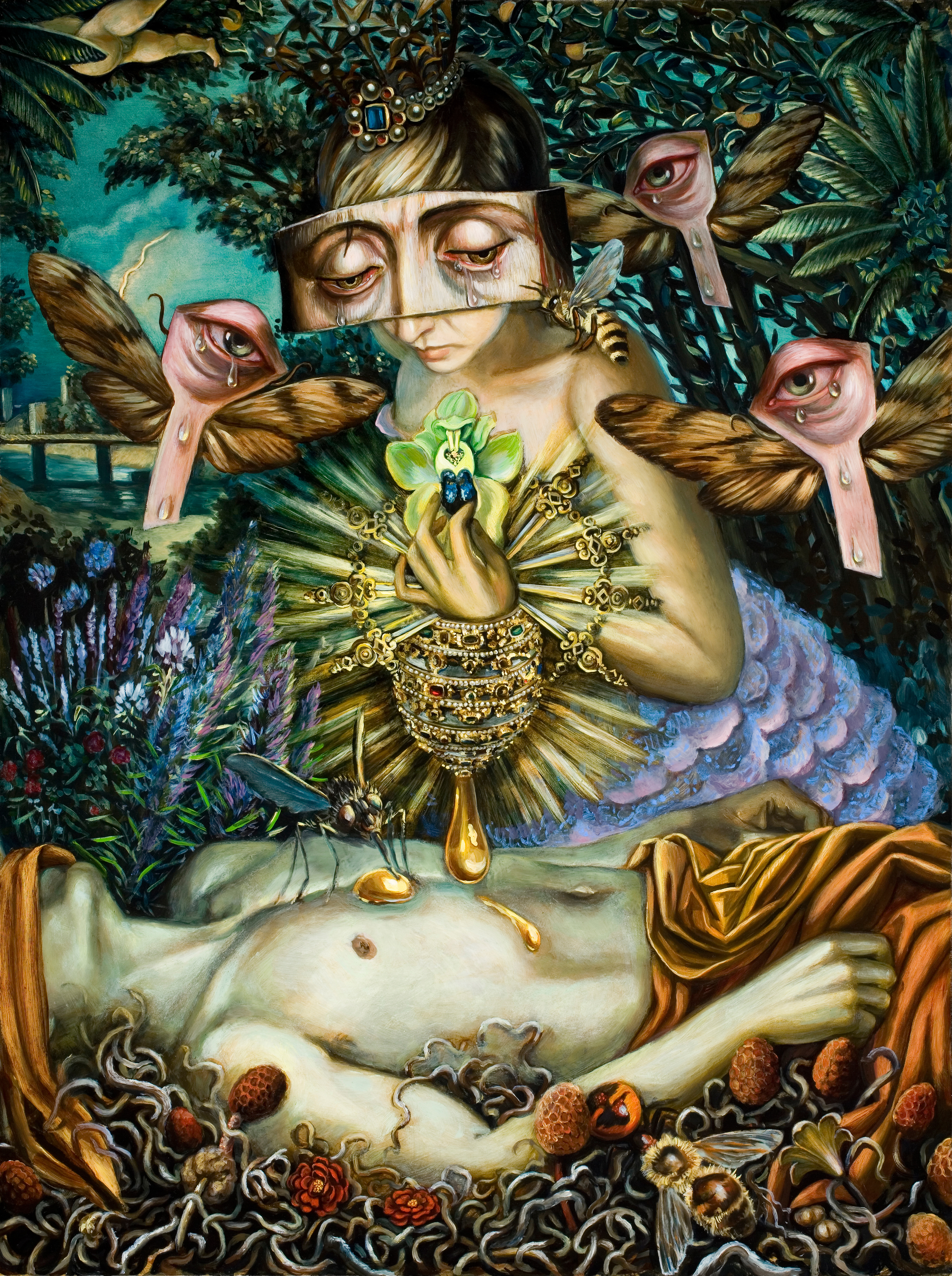
The Perilous Compassion of the Honey Queen by Carrie Ann Baade, oil on panel, 18" x 24"

Scissors & Tears (2022) — Baade's first solo monograph, written by Susan Aberth and published by La Luz de Jesus Press (ISBN 978-1-7326697-3-4), spans approximately 160 pages and features her allegorical oil paintings, collages, and drawings drawn from two decades of practice. The book was released in conjunction with her solo exhibition Sawing a Woman in Half at La Luz de Jesus Gallery in Los Angeles, held from September 10 to October 1, 2022.

== Publications ==
Books

- Aberth, Susan. (2022) "Carrie Ann Baade: Scissors & Tears". La Luz de Jesus Press; ISBN 978-1-7326697-3-4 / 978–1732669734
- Baade, Carrie A, Ray Burggraf, Lilian Garcia-Roig, Mark Messersmith, and Judith Rushin.(2015) "Back and Forth: Thinking in Paint"; ISBN 978-1-889282-31-2 / 1889282316
- Stewart, Mary. (2014) Launching the Imagination. McGraw-Hill Education, ISBN 978-0-07-777343-4 / 9780077773434
- Baade, Carrie Ann & Hightower, Nancy E. (2011) Cute and Creepy. University of Washington Press; ISBN 978-1-889282-24-4
- Spoor, Nathan. (2011) Suggestivism: A Comprehensive Survey of Contemporary Artists. Gingko Press; ISBN 978-1-58423-447-0
- Ziegler, Tina. (2010) Hunt & Gather. Mark Batty Publisher; ISBN 978-0-9819600-3-6
- Becket-Griffith, Jasmine. (2008) Gothic Art Now. HarperCollins Canada / Harper International; ISBN 978-0-06-162699-9.
- Kuntyj, Lynda. (2008) Visual Arts: A Resource for Units 2A-2B. Impact Publishing; ISBN 978-1-921305-24-5.
- Beinart, Jon. (2007) Metamorphosis: 50 Surrealists and Visionary Artists. Visionary Press; ISBN 978-0-9803231-0-8

Articles and Reviews

- Gross, Rachel Elspeth. "Birthplace: Remember Louisiana’s Forgotten Women with Carrie Ann Baade." Forbes, January 2, 2025.
- "Book Review: Carrie Ann Baade and the Ja..." MutualArt, 2025.
- "Halo Arts Awards." Your Observer, March 16, 2025.
- "Eyes Wide Shut." American Art Collector, Issue 229, 2025.

Magazines

- Staniec, Kevin. (2008) ISM: Untitled Love Project. Issue #15
- Weird Tales (Hugo Award Winner). Cover, Issue #358
