= Michael McGee =

Michael or Mike McGee may refer to:

== Sports ==
- Michael McGee (Gaelic footballer)
- Mike McGee (American football) (1938–2019), American football player and coach, college athletics administrator
- Mike McGee (basketball) (born 1959), American basketball coach and former NBA player

== Others ==
- Michael McGee Jr. (born 1969), former Milwaukee alderman
- Michael Calvin McGee (1943–2002), American rhetorical theorist, writer and social critic
- Mike McGee (gallery director), gallery director for the CSUF Begovich Gallery in Fullerton, California, United States
- Mighty Mike McGee (born 1976), American slam poet

== See also ==
- Michael Magee (disambiguation)
