= Well to Hell =

Urban legend regarding borehole in Russia

The "Well to Hell", also known as the "Siberian hell sounds", is an urban legend regarding a putative borehole in the Siberian region of Russia, which was purportedly drilled so deep that it broke through into Hell.

== Legend and basis ==
The legend holds that a team of Soviet engineers purportedly led by an individual named "Mr. Azakov" in an unnamed place in Siberia had drilled a hole that was 14.4 km (9 miles) deep before breaking through to a cavity. Intrigued by this unexpected discovery, they lowered an extremely heat-tolerant microphone, along with other sensory equipment, into the well. The temperature deep within was 1,000 °C (1,800 °F), heat from a chamber of fire from which screaming could be heard.

The Soviet Union had, in fact, drilled a hole more than 12 km (7.5 miles) deep, the Kola Superdeep Borehole, located not in Siberia but on the Kola Peninsula. Upon reaching the depth of 12,262 m (40,230 feet) in 1989, geological anomalies were found, although they reported no supernatural encounters. The recording of "tormented screams" was later found to be looped together from various sound effects, sometimes identified as the soundtrack of the 1972 movie Baron Blood.

== Propagation ==
The story was reported to first have been published by the Finnish newspaper Ammennusastia, a journal published by a group of Pentecostal Christians from Leväsjoki, a village in the municipality of Siikainen in Western Finland. Rich Buhler, who interviewed the editors, found that the story had been based on recollections of a letter printed in the feature section of a newspaper called Etelä Suomen (possibly the Etelä-Suomen Sanomat). When contacting the letter's author, Buhler found that he had drawn from a story appearing in a Finnish Christian newsletter named Vaeltajat, which had printed the story in July 1989. The newsletter's editor claimed that its origin had been a newsletter called Jewels of Jericho, published by a group of Messianic Jews in California. Here, Buhler stopped tracing the origins any further.

American tabloids soon ran the story, and sound files began appearing on various sites across the Internet. Sensational retellings of the legend can be found on YouTube, usually featuring the aforementioned Baron Blood sound effects.

=== TBN involvement ===
The story eventually made its way to the American Christian Trinity Broadcasting Network (TBN), which broadcast it on the network, claiming it to be proof of the literal existence of Hell.

Åge Rendalen, a Norwegian teacher, heard the story on TBN while visiting the United States. Disgusted with what he perceived to be mass gullibility, Rendalen decided to augment the tale at TBN's expense.

Rendalen wrote to the network, originally claiming that he disbelieved the tale but, upon his return to Norway, supposedly read a factual account of the story. According to Rendalen, the story claimed not only that the cursed well was real, but that a bat-like apparition (a common pictorial representation of demons, such as in Michelangelo's The Torment of Saint Anthony or the more recent Bat Boy by Weekly World News) had risen out of it before blazing a trail across the Russian sky. To perpetuate his hoax, Rendalen deliberately mistranslated a trivial Norwegian article about a local building inspector into the story, and submitted both the original Norwegian article and the English "translation" to TBN. Rendalen also included his real name, phone number, and address, as well as those of a pastor friend who knew about the hoax and had agreed to expose it to anyone who called seeking verification.

However, TBN did nothing to verify Rendalen's claims, and aired the story as proof of the validity of the original story.

== Alternative versions ==
Since its publicity, many alternative versions of the Well to Hell story have been published. In 1992, the U.S. tabloid Weekly World News published an alternative version of the story, which was set in Alaska where three miners were killed after Satan came roaring out of Hell.

== See also ==
- Darvaza gas crater
- Mel's Hole
- Nine Miles Down, a film inspired by the urban legend
- The Devil Below, a 2021 horror movie about a group of people looking for a burning coal seam. They discuss the Well to Hell.
- Stull, Kansas
- The Superdeep, a 2020 Russian horror film directed by Arseny Syuhin, based on the real-life Kola Superdeep Borehole.
- "Transmission from Hell", a song on the Cradle of Filth album Evermore Darkly..., inspired by the legend.
