= Doug Harvey =

Doug Harvey may refer to:

- Doug Harvey (ice hockey) (1924–1989), Canadian National Hockey League player, member of the Hockey Hall of Fame
- Doug Harvey (umpire) (1930–2018), member of the Baseball Hall of Fame
- Doug Harvey (artist), writer, curator and artist based in Los Angeles
