= List of 2021 box office number-one films in Lithuania =

This is a list of films which have placed number one at the weekend box office in Lithuania during 2021.

== Number-one films ==
†	This implies the highest-grossing movie of the year.

#	Date	Film	Gross	Notes	Ref(s)
1–16	January 3, 2021 – April 18, 2021	Lithuanian cinemas closed and box office reporting suspended due to the COVID-19 pandemic			
17	April 25, 2021	The Superdeep	$188		
18	May 2, 2021	Mortal Kombat	$16,632		
19	May 9, 2021	The Unholy	$24,519		
20	May 16, 2021	Wrath of Man	$18,651		
21	May 23, 2021	Raya and the Last Dragon	$21,295		
22	May 30, 2021	A Quiet Place Part II	$34,702		
23	June 6, 2021	The Conjuring: The Devil Made Me Do It	$23,977		
24	June 13, 2021	The Conjuring: The Devil Made Me Do It	$25,315		
25	June 20, 2021	The Hitman's Wife's Bodyguard	$8,292		
26	June 27, 2021	F9	$59,469		
27	July 4, 2021	F9	$25,340		
28	July 11, 2021	Black Widow	$39,111		
29	July 18, 2021	Space Jam: A New Legacy	$42,771		
30	July 25, 2021	Luca	$31,617		
31	August 1, 2021	Luca	$25,686		
32	August 8, 2021	Naktinė žvejyba	$37,804		
33	August 15, 2021	Free Guy	$23,134		
34	July 22, 2021	PAW Patrol: The Movie	$39,219		
35	August 29, 2021	PAW Patrol: The Movie	$30,076		
36	September 5, 2021	Shang-Chi and the Legend of the Ten Rings	$29,852		
37	September 12, 2021	After We Fell	$22,277		
38	September 19, 2021	Dune	$112,804		
39	September 26, 2021	Dune	$83,105		
40	October 3, 2021	No Time to Die	$115,712		
41	October 10, 2021	No Time to Die	$69,477		
42	October 17, 2021	Venom: Let There Be Carnage	$119,464		
43	October 24, 2021	Venom: Let There Be Carnage	$69,898		
44	October 31, 2021	Venom: Let There Be Carnage	$33,251		
45	November 7, 2021	Eternals	$79,657		
46	November 14, 2021	Eternals	$37,576		
47	November 21, 2021	Ghostbusters: Afterlife	$39,490		
48	November 28, 2021	House of Gucci †	$155,574		
49	December 5, 2021	House of Gucci †	$103,972		
50	December 12, 2021	House of Gucci †	$71,802		
51	December 19, 2021	Spider-Man: No Way Home	$220,675		
52	December 26, 2021	Spider-Man: No Way Home	$52,252		
53	January 2, 2022	Vyras už pinigus	$127,897		

== See also ==
- List of Lithuanian films — Lithuanian films by year
