= Greg Simkins =

American painter

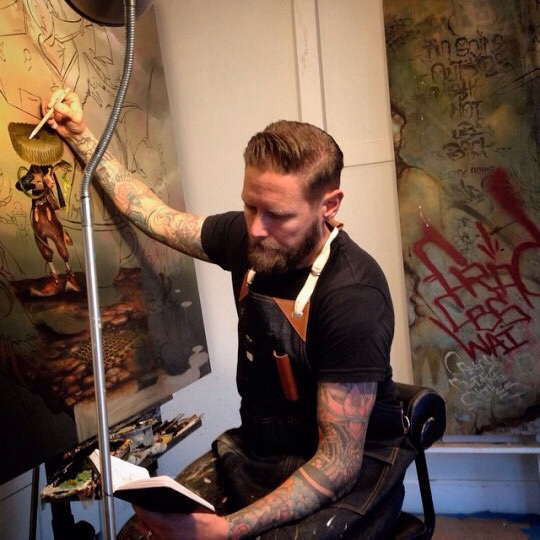
- Born: February 28, 1975 (age 51); Torrance, California
- Known for: Painting, drawing, and graffiti
- Movement: Pop Surrealism
- Website: www.imscared.com

Greg "Craola" Simkins (born February 28, 1975) is an American artist.

== Education and early life ==
Greg Simkins was born in Torrance, California, slightly south of Los Angeles. His artistic ambitions began at age three with drawings inspired by cartoons and books. Some of these works, such as The Chronicles of Narnia by C.S. Lewis, The Phantom Tollbooth by Norton Juster, and Watership Down by Richard Adams, still find reference in his art. He grew up with a variety of animals, including a number of rabbits, which often appear in his paintings.

Simkins earned his Bachelor of Arts in Studio Art from California State University, Long Beach in 1999.

== Professional career ==
After graduating, Simkins went to work as an illustrator for several clothing firms before moving on to the video game industry, where he worked on games for Treyarch/Activision such as Tony Hawk's Pro Skater 2, Spider-Man 2, and Ultimate Spider-Man. He became a full-time artist in 2005.

== Style ==
At the age of 18, Simkins began doing graffiti under the name "Craola". Graffiti drove his inspiration to create and gave him the confidence and experience to paint large scale works. It also taught him color theory and perspective while further developing his artistic skills, which were later used in his work with acrylics.

Simkins' works feature story-lines and vignettes of camaraderies and conflicts that are usually seen as unlikely or unusual, combining animal figures with imagined landscapes; for example, some of his works depict deer with killer whales, puppies with crustaceans, and birds with rodents. He paints on canvas, paper and walls, often employing smooth graffiti gradients. His work has been described as playful yet ominous.

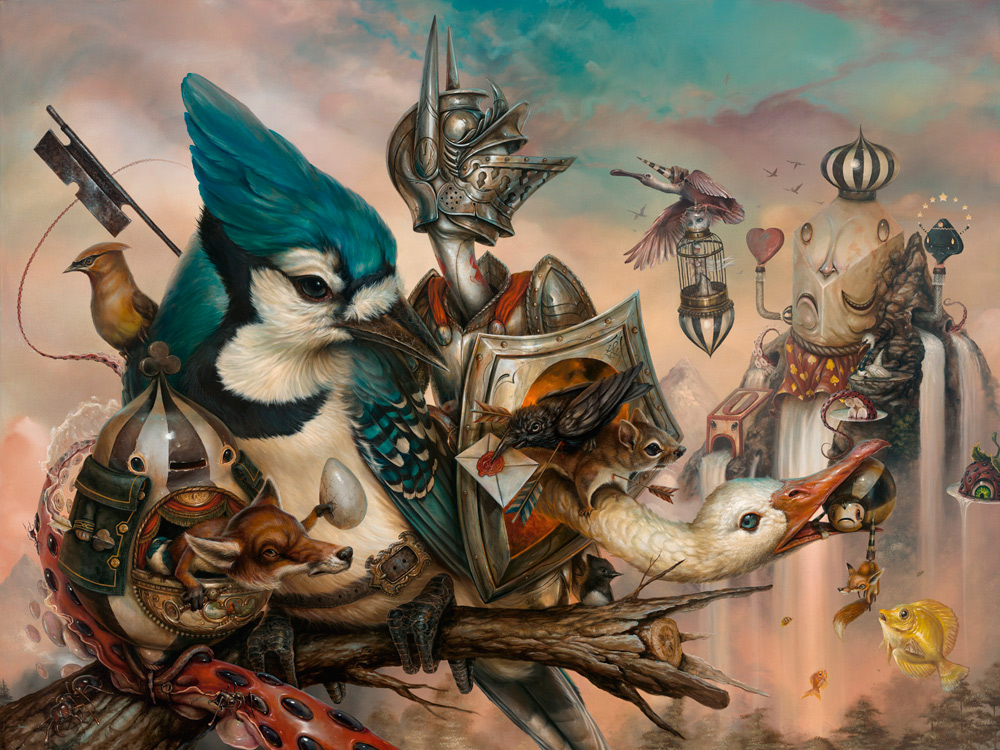
"Good Knight" by Greg 'Craola' Simkins, acrylic on canvas wrapped panel, 72" x 96"

== Exhibitions ==
Simkins' paintings have been included in various narrative art exhibitions, including the group shows Suggestivism at Grand Central Art Center in Santa Ana, Family Guy! at the Los Angeles Museum of TV & Radio, Street Cred at the Pasadena Museum of California Art, Visionary Art at Mondo Bizarro Gallery in Rome, Art from the New World at the Bristol City Museum and Art Gallery in Bristol, England, Sons of Baby Tattooville at the Riverside Art Museum, and MasterWorks: Defining A New Narrative at the Long Beach Museum of Art.

Simkins had his curatorial debut with INLE at Gallery Nineteen Eighty Eight in 2011, a show in which he also participated. The exhibit included art inspired by the book Watership Down by over 100 artists.

=== Solo shows ===
- Good Knight, Stop Haunting Me, and Cloud Theory at Merry Karnowsky Gallery in Los Angeles
- Inside the Outside at Joshua Liner Gallery in New York
- A two-person exhibit with Lola at Galerie d'Art Yves Laroche in Montreal
- The Pearl Thief at Gallery Nineteen Eighty Eight in Los Angeles
- Seeing Things at FIFTY24/SF Gallery in San Francisco
- It Wanders West at Gallery Nineteen Eighty Eight
- It Wanders East at Joshua Liner Gallery
- The Well at m Modern Gallery in Palm Springs, CA
- I’m Scared at Gallery Nineteen Eighty Eight
- Don’t Sleep at FIFTY24/SF Gallery
- Ima Monsta at Gallery Nineteen Eighty Eight

== Publications ==
=== Publications by Simkins ===
- Simkins, Greg. (2011) Drawn From the Well. Presto Art. ISBN 978-0982404737.
- Simkins, Greg. (2013) The Outside. Presto Art. ISBN 978-0985063801.

=== Publications with contributions by Simkins ===
- Ganz, Nicholas & Manco, Tristan. (2004) Graffiti World: Street Art from Five Continents. Harry N. Abrams, Inc. ISBN 978-0810949799.
- Gibson, Jon M. and Klosterman, Chuck (2006) i am 8-bit: Art Inspired by Classic Videogames of the '80s. Chronicle. ISBN 978-0811853194.
- Beinart, Jon. (2007) Metamorphosis 2: 50 Contemporary Surreal, Fantastic, and Visionary Artists. BeinART. ISBN 978-0980323115.
- Weber, Diana. (2009) Juxtapoz Dark Arts. Gingko. ISBN 978-1584233619.
- Owens, Annie. (2009) Hi-fructose Collected Edition. Last Gasp of San Francisco. ISBN 978-0867197136.
- Spoor, Nathan. (2011) Suggestivism: A Comprehensive Survey of Contemporary Artists. Gingko. ISBN 978-1584234470.
- Ziegler, Tina. (2010) Hunt & Gather. Mark Batty. ISBN 978-0981960036.
- Smith, Kevin & Gallery 1988. (2011) Crazy 4 Cult: Cult Movie Art. Titan. ISBN 978-0857681034.
- Eaton, Tristan, and McCormick, Carlo. (2011) The 3D Art Book. Prestel. ISBN 978-3791345499.
