= Lisa and the Devil =

1974 film by Mario Bava

- Spanish theatrical release poster
- Directed by: Mario Bava
- Produced by: Alfredo Leone
- Starring: Telly Savalas; Elke Sommer; Sylva Koscina; Alida Valli
- Cinematography: Cecilio Paniagua
- Edited by: Carlo Reali
- Music by: Carlo Savina
- Production companies: Euro America Produzioni Cinematografiche; Leone International Film; Roxy Film; Tecisa
- Release date: 25 November 1974 (Spain)
- Running time: 95 minutes
- Countries: Italy; West Germany; Spain

The House of Exorcism
- Directed by: Mario Bava; Alfredo Leone; Lamberto Bava
- Screenplay by: Alberto Cittini; Alfredo Leone
- Produced by: Alfredo Leone
- Distributed by: Transeuropa
- Release date: 2 April 1975 (Italy)
- Running time: 91 minutes
- Box office: ₤90.939 million

Lisa and the Devil (Italian: Lisa e il Diavolo) is a 1974 horror film directed by Mario Bava and starring Elke Sommer, Telly Savalas, Sylva Koscina and Alida Valli. It follows a tourist named Lisa (Sommer) who loses her way in Toledo and spends the night at a villa belonging to a mysterious countess and her son. The film is an Italian, West German, and Spanish co-production.

The film was first released in Spain in November 1974 as El diablo se lleva a los muertos (lit. 'The Devil Takes the Dead'). Following a lukewarm reception, the film was retooled by producer Alfredo Leone, who sought to exploit the popularity of The Exorcist by adding newly-filmed scenes featuring a priest attempting to exorcise a possessed Lisa. This version, entitled The House of Exorcism, was released on April 2, 1975. Mario Bava permitted the new cut but only claimed ownership of Lisa and the Devil. Decades after its initial screening, Bava’s original cut was released on home video, where it received a more positive response.

== Plot ==
During a tour of Toledo, Lisa Reiner encounters a fresco that depicts the Devil carrying off the dead. Hearing music, Lisa wanders into a shop, where she finds a music box topped with rotating figurines. The shop owner, who is helping a man named Leandro design a mustachioed dummy, informs Lisa that the box belongs to Leandro, who resembles the Devil in the fresco.

Lisa flees and becomes lost. She re-encounters Leandro, who points her through a nearby arch. After climbing a stairway, Lisa is confronted by Carlos, who resembles Leandro’s dummy. He refers to her as "Elena" and claims that he has come back for her. A distressed Lisa pushes him away, inadvertently causing him to fall to his apparent death. She flees and cries for help.

As night falls, Lisa hitchhikes with a couple, Francis and Sophia Lehar, and their chauffeur George. The car breaks down, and the group seek refuge at a nearby villa, where Leandro serves as butler to a blind countess and her son Maximilian, who convinces her to let the group spend the night at a cottage on the property until George repairs the car.

Sophia and George have sex while Francis bathes. Lisa flees the cottage after seeing Carlos try to enter through a window. She runs into Maximilian, who says that she saw Leandro carrying his Carlos dummy. He alludes to a previous romance between Lisa and himself, despite Lisa's denial.

Lisa and the Lehars dine with Maximilian and the countess. Maximilian delivers dessert to a detained person in an upstairs bedroom. He tells the detainee that Carlos has returned and vows to never again let him come between them. He burns a photograph of Elena, who resembles Lisa.

Lisa has erotic visions of Elena with Carlos, and then of herself kissing Maximilian, who morphs into Carlos, to her horror. Outside, Francis insults and slaps Sophia for her extramarital affair. Sophia discovers the body of George, who has been stabbed to death and left in the car. Maximilian and Leandro advise Francis to leave George's corpse with them and depart without involving the police.

Maximilian vows to Lisa that he will never leave her, but the countess interrupts and chastises her son. Lisa wanders away and encounters Carlos, who tells her to wait while he spies on Leandro. Lisa sees Leandro entering the estate's chapel and apparently arranging Carlos’s body in a coffin, but then she immediately runs into Carlos outside again. She flees into the villa and discovers a bedroom full of dummies, then faints when Carlos suddenly reappears.

Francis tries to force Sophia to leave with him in the car, but she runs him over and returns to the villa. In the dummy room, she witnesses Maximilian bludgeoning Carlos to death as Carlos tries to revive Lisa. Maximilian pursues and murders Sophia. In the chapel, the countess addresses Carlos’s body and reveals that Carlos was her husband, Maximilian’s stepfather, who had an affair with Maximilian’s lover, Elena.

Leandro revives Lisa, takes her measurements, and tells her that Carlos is dead. Lisa finds the countess examining Sophia’s body and runs to Maximilian, who leads her to the bedroom where he is detaining Elena, now a skeletonized corpse. Maximilian chloroforms and rapes Lisa, but is interrupted by sounds of Elena’s laughter.

The countess offers to conceal Maximilian’s murders if he will disavow or possibly kill Lisa. Maximilian stabs the countess to death. He later encounters the corpses of Sophia, Francis, Elena, Carlos, and George seated at a table as the undead countess approaches him. Backing away in fear, Maximilian falls out of a window to his death. Leandro appears behind the countess, who goes limp like a dummy.

Lisa awakens in the villa’s ruins. She encounters a Maximilian dummy and seems to hear it imploring her to stay. She leaves and frightens a group of schoolgirls, one of whom states that no one has lived at the villa for a hundred years. Lisa boards a plane but discovers that the other passengers are the corpses from the villa and the pilot is Leandro, who watches as Lisa crumples to the floor and turns into a dummy dressed like Elena.

== Cast ==
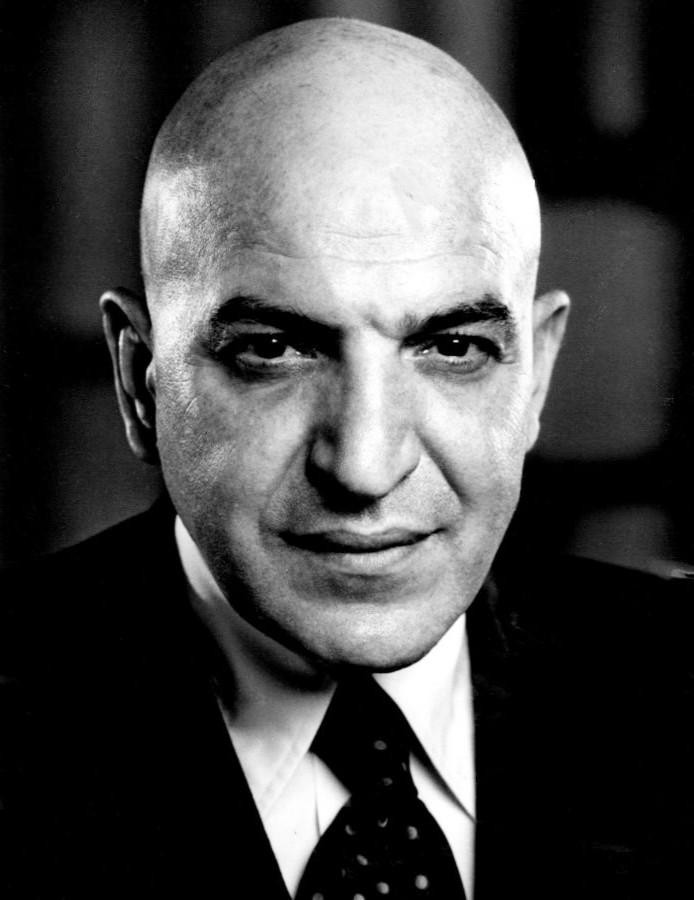
Telly Savalas in 1973, the year the film was shown at the Cannes Film Market.

- Telly Savalas as Leandro
- Elke Sommer as Lisa Reiner/Elena
- Sylva Koscina as Sophia Lehar
- Alessio Orano as Maximilian
- Alida Valli as Countess
- Gabriele Tinti as George
- Kathy Leone as Lisa's Friend
- Eduardo Fajardo as Francis Lehar
- Franz von Treuberg as Shopkeeper
- Espartaco Santoni as Carlo

Additional cast members for The House of Exorcism

- Robert Alda as Father Michael
- Carmen Silva as Anna

== Production ==
Lisa and the Devil was the second film director Mario Bava made with producer Alfredo Leone, who gave Bava complete control to make any kind of film he wanted after working on Baron Blood. Along with Giorgio Maulini, Romano Migliorini, Roberto Natale and Maulini's girlfriend Francesca Rusicka created a story for the film. Rusicka was a non-professional and remain uncredited for her contributions to the film. The film began shooting under the title Il diavolo e i morti (lit. 'The Devil and the Dead') in Spain from early September to late November 1972. According to Lamberto Bava, some lines of dialogue in the film were lifted verbatim from Dostoyevsky's novel The Demons. The story and screenplay is credited to Mario Bava and Alfredo Leone in the International version of Lisa and the Devil, while the Italian version includes Maulini, Migliorini, and Natale.

== Release ==
Lisa and the Devil was first shown at the Cannes Film Market on 9 May 1973. Italian film critic and historian Roberto Curti described this screening as "disastrous". Lisa and the Devil was submitted to the Italian film censors in November 1973 which had an 86-minute and 25 second running time, a shorter version than the Spanish theatrical release. Lisa and the Devil was released theatrically in Spain on 25 November 1974 in Barcelona. The film was released in Madrid in March 1975. The Spanish cut included a gorier version of Koscina's death scene and shortened sex scenes and part of the ending edited out. The Lisa and the Devil version never received a theatrical release in Italy in its original form.

After the wide popularity of the film The Exorcist, Alfredo Leone approached Mario Bava about adding exorcism scenes to the film. Mario allowed it and sent his son Lamberto to assist him. The new version, titled The House of Exorcism, adds a framing story of Father Michael, an exorcist played by Robert Alda. This also includes more gruesome killings and more risque footage of Elke Sommer. Leone has stated that the additional scenes were shot by both Mario and himself. Lamberto stated that "Some stuff in La casa dell'esorcismo was directed by Leone, whereas other scenes, I taught him how to make them, technically speaking" When asked about the film in May 1976, Mario Bava stated that the film was not his "even though it bears my signature. It is the same situation, too long to explain, of a cuckolded father who finds himself with a child that is not his own, and with his name, and cannot do anything about it."

The House of Exorcism was released in Italy as La casa dell'esoercismo on 2 April 1975 where it was distributed by Transeuropa. The film grossed a total of 90,939,354 Italian lire in Italy. The House of Exorcism was released in the United States on 9 July 1976, where it was distributed by Peppercorn-Wormser Film Enterprises.

== Critical reception ==
From retrospective reviews, AllMovie commented on Lisa and the Devil noting that "Bava's original cut is confusing at times, but it is far better than the 'possession' theme that was oddly spliced into House." Marco Lanzagorta of PopMatters gave the movie eight stars out of ten, stating "By showcasing a dream-like imagery and lyrical storyline, Lisa and the Devil may not be an easy film to watch. This is a gorgeous film that takes place in a metaphysical hell where logic breaks down in nightmarish ways. But then again, its completely ambiguous storyline leaves the viewer pondering long after it's over. Mysterious, creepy, and beautiful, Lisa and the Devil is required viewing for the serious horror fan."

== Footnotes ==
=== References ===
- Curti, Roberto (2017). Italian Gothic Horror Films, 1970–1979. McFarland. ISBN 978-1476629605.
- Hughes, Howard (2011). Cinema Italiano - The Complete Guide From Classics To Cult. London - New York: I.B.Tauris. ISBN 978-1-84885-608-0.
- Paul, Louis (2005). Italian Horror Film Directors. McFarland. ISBN 978-0-7864-8749-3.
