= Center for Land Use Interpretation =

Nonprofit organization in Los Angeles, United States

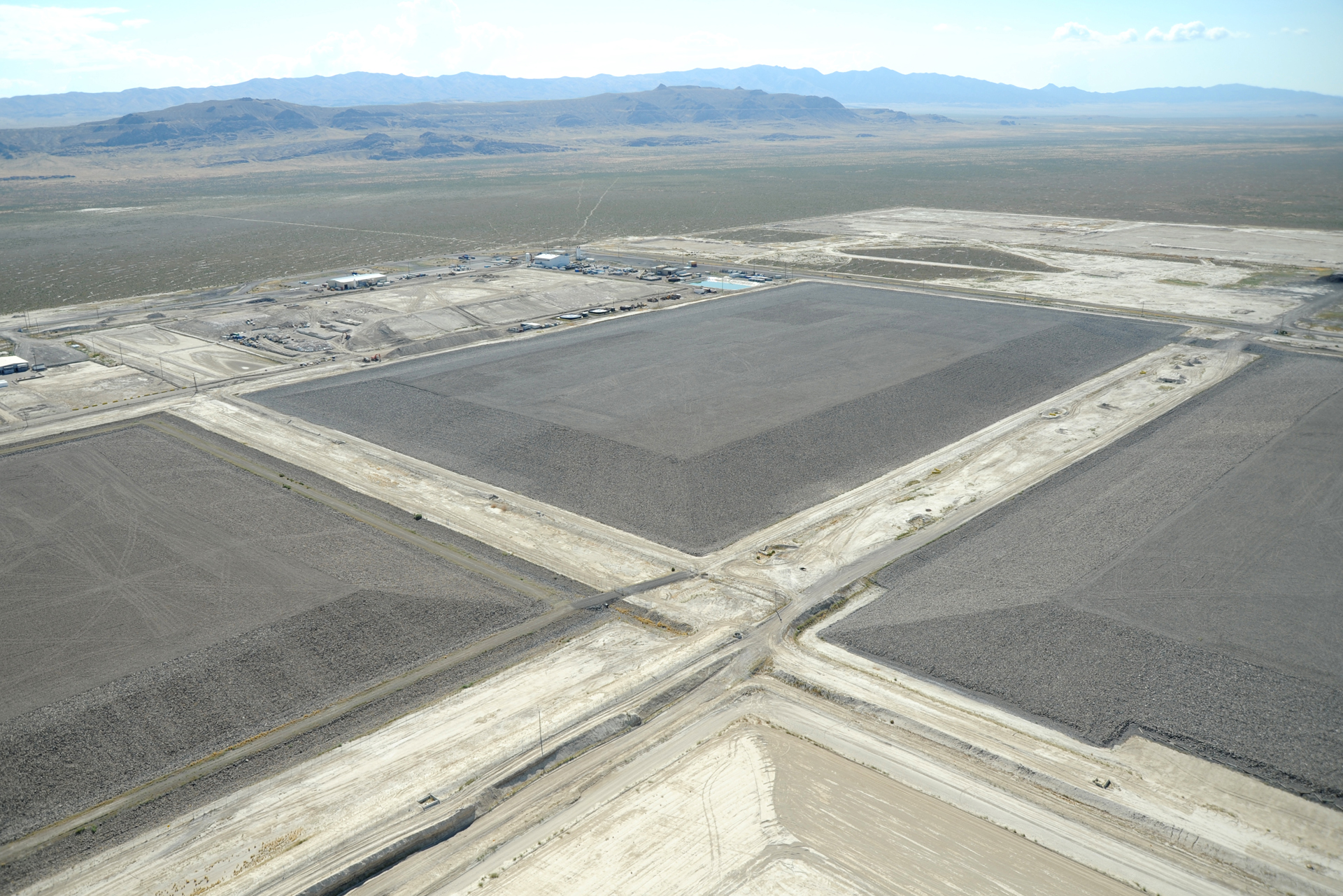
Clive disposal facility

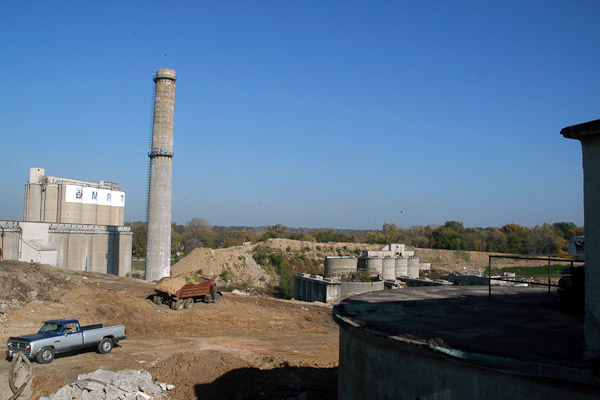
Cementland tower

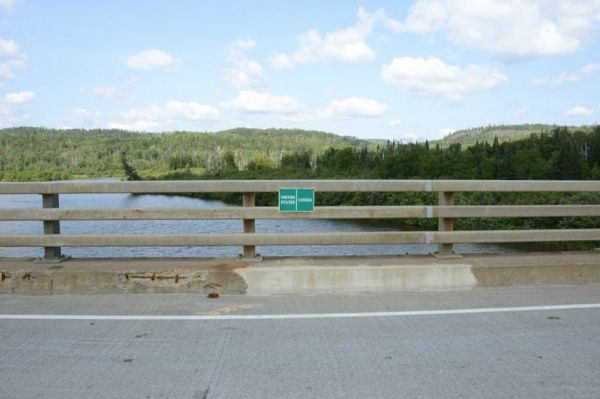
Grand Portage MN boundary line

The Center for Land Use Interpretation (CLUI) is a non-profit research and education organization involved in exploring, examining, and understanding contemporary landscape issues in the United States. Founded in 1994, the CLUI organizes exhibitions, programs, field trips, and maintains an online archive and database to engage the public's understanding of the man-made landscape, and extent and impacts of human interactions with the surface of the Earth. The Center employs a variety of methods to this end, engaging in research, classification, extrapolation, and exhibition.

== Mission ==
The mission statement of the CLUI is to "increase and diffuse knowledge about how the nation's lands are apportioned, utilized, and perceived."

== Programs and projects ==
The CLUI also organizes exhibitions, research projects, and public programs. The Center's programs and projects cover many types of land uses in the US, including those related to agriculture, energy, industry, mining, communication, waste management, water resources, transportation, commerce, housing, recreation, and defense and preparedness.

The organization produces exhibitions about land use phenomenology in the US, and displays them at its exhibit locations and at other museum and non-commercial and educational venues. The CLUI produces publications, online resources, tours, lectures, and other public programs across the country. Activities of the Center are summarized and discussed in its annual newsletter, The Lay of the Land, in print and online.

The CLUI's main office is in Los Angeles where it operates a display space open to the public. It also operates other facilities and interpretive sites throughout the US, including in Wendover, Utah, at a former military facility, where the CLUI operated an artist residency program from 1996–2016; and the Desert Research Station in Hinkley, California.

CLUI is also the lead agency for the establishment of the American Land Museum, a network of exhibition sites in various interpretive zones across the country, which together form a dynamic portrait of the national landscape. According to Coolidge, the "man made landscape is a cultural inscription that can help us better understand who we are and what we are doing."

The CLUI organizes public field trips to sites of interesting and unusual land use. This has been documented in the book, Overlook: Exploring the Internal Fringes of America with the Center for Land Use Interpretation.

== Reception ==
Neither an environmental organization nor an artist collective, CLUI resists categorization by maintaining a diverse, eclectic program of activities that invite a closer examination of "humankind's interaction with the Earth's surface". Writer and curator Lucy Lippard suggests the CLUI occupies "a tantalizing liminal space (that) has opened up between disciplines, between the arts, geography, history, archeology, sociology".

Culture writer Doug Harvey says that the Center is known for its "multidisciplinary examinations of human/landscape interaction, 'uncategorizable'". He refers to CLUI programs, such as the 2008 Post Consumed exhibit and bus tour as "subtly infused with formal beauty and wit ... unobtrusively informed by a patchwork of art historical, contemporary theoretical, sociological and geopolitical concerns and brimming with new information you don't know is here until the ride home."

According to the Los Angeles Times' architecture critic, Christopher Hawthorne, the CLUI's activities "all tell some version of the same story: how we shape and find meaning in the physical landscape around us, whether it's through oil exploration, architecture, map-making or freeway building."

The CLUI specializes in what writer Nicola Twilley describes as a "brand of perceptual revelation ... in which a previously overlooked site is made not only visible, but also legible as a guide to understanding larger, nationwide systems."

== Online resources ==
The CLUI makes a collection of "unusual and exemplary" land use sites in the United States available online, through its database. The database compiles site-specific images taken by members of the CLUI, and are attributed to the CLUI Photo Archive. Also available through the CLUI website is the Morgan Cowles Archive, an online image resource that presents thematic photo collections, drawn from over 100,000 images of thousands of locations taken by a range of CLUI participants throughout the years, which exists though the support of "an endowment from the family and friends of Morgan Cowles, in his memory."

== See also ==
- Cultural landscape
- Sense of place
