= Baron Blood (film) =

1972 film by Mario Bava

- Italian theatrical release poster
- Italian: Gli orrori del castello di Norimberga
- Directed by: Mario Bava
- Screenplay by: Vincent G. Fotre; Willibald Eser; Mario Bava; William A. Bairn
- Story by: Vincent G. Fotre
- Produced by: Alfredo Leone
- Starring: Joseph Cotten; Elke Sommer; Massimo Girotti; Antonio Cantafora; Luciano Pigozzi; Umberto Raho; Rada Rassimov
- Cinematography: Antonio Rinaldi; Mario Bava
- Edited by: Carlo Reali
- Music by: Stelvio Cipriani
- Production companies: Euro America Produzioni Cinematografiche; Dieter Geissler Filmproduktion GmbH & Co.; Cinevision Ltd.
- Distributed by: Jumbo Cinematografica (Italy)
- Release date: 25 February 1972 (Italy)
- Running time: 98 minutes
- Countries: Italy; West Germany
- Languages: English; Italian
- Box office: ₤269.812 million

Baron Blood (Italian: Gli orrori del castello di Norimberga, lit. 'The horrors of Nuremberg Castle') is a 1972 horror film directed by Mario Bava, and starring Joseph Cotten, Elke Sommer, Massimo Girotti, Antonio Cantafora and Rada Rassimov. The film centers on Baron Otto von Kleist (Cotten), a murderous noble who is resurrected from the dead by his descendant, Peter (Cantafora), and a college student named Eva (Sommer).

An international co-production of Italy and West Germany, the film was shot primarily on-location at Burg Kreuzenstein and Klosterneuburg in Austria. It represented Bava's return to the gothic horror sub-genre after making contemporary giallo films. It was released in Italy on 25 February 1972 by Jumbo Cinematografica.

== Plot ==
American Peter Kleist arrives in Austria to take a break from college studies and look up his family's history. At the airport, he is greeted by his uncle, Karl Hummel, who invites him to stay at his house. Peter learns from Karl that his great-grandfather, Baron Otto von Kleist, nicknamed "Baron Blood", was a notorious sadist who tortured and murdered over 100 villagers. Legend says he burned a witch named Elizabeth Hölle, who cursed him with a spell that would allow him to rise from the dead so she could take her revenge on him eternally. The Baron's old castle and former residence is being remodeled into a hotel for tourists. Peter persuades his uncle to take him to the castle.

At the castle, they meet Herr Dortmundt, the entrepreneur responsible for the hotel project, and Eva, a former college student of Karl. Her job is to ensure Dortmundt does not make any lasting changes to the castle's architecture. After a tour of the castle, Karl invites Eva to his house for dinner. During the meal, Peter brings up the subject of Baron von Kleist. Karl's young daughter, Gretchen, claims to have seen the Baron in the woods near the castle, but nobody listens to her. Peter produces an ancient document he found at his grandfather's house back in America. It is an incantation that will supposedly bring the Baron back to life when read in the castle bell tower at midnight.

Against Karl's warnings, Peter and Eva go to the castle and read the incantation. Although it is midnight, the bell tolls two o'clock, the same time Baron von Kleist was murdered. Heavy footsteps approach from outside. Eva implores Peter to recant the incantation, using the alternate spell on the same document. But a gust of wind blows the parchment into a fireplace. Peter goes outside to investigate, but there is no one there.

In the castle's woods, the Baron emerges from his grave and visits a doctor's office. The doctor dresses his wounds. When the doctor insists on calling an ambulance, the Baron grabs a scalpel and stabs him to death.

The next morning, Peter and Eva admit what they've done. Karl insists they are imagining things and tells them to forget about it. The Baron secretly enters his castle and kills Dortmundt, hanging him from the ceiling. When the body is found by Fritz, the caretaker of the castle, the Baron kills him also. With Dortmundt dead, the plans for restoring the castle fall through, and the property goes up for auction.

The next day, Alfred Becker, a millionaire who uses a wheelchair, purchases the castle. He offers Eva a job in assisting him in restoring the castle to its original condition. She gladly accepts. Later, Eva is attacked in one of the castle corridors by the Baron. She is saved by the intrusion of Peter. Eva quits her job and decides to make a fresh start elsewhere.

That evening, Eva returns to her apartment in town, only to find the Baron waiting for her. She escapes through a window and seeks shelter at Karl's home. Finally convinced that the Baron is alive, Karl agrees to help Eva and Peter find a way to destroy him. They visit Christina, a local medium, who conjures Hölle's spirit from the netherworld for information about the Baron. Christina gives them a magic amulet and tells them that only those who raised the Baron from the dead, are able to destroy him. Because of this, he will do everything in his power to kill Peter and Eva. After Peter, Eva, and Karl leave, the Baron kills Christina.

On her way home from school, Gretchen is terrorized by the Baron, who chases her through the woods. Returning to the castle, Gretchen meets Becker for the first time. She tells her father that Becker is the Baron; she recognizes his eyes. Karl, Peter, and Eva confront Becker. He shows them the restored castle, complete with dummies impaled on stakes. Becker rises from his wheelchair and knocks out Peter, Karl, and Eva. He then takes them to his torture chamber.

When Eva wakes up, she is laying on the ground and when she tries to get up, she sees Fritz's dead body in the open spike-lined coffin beside her. Becker ties Karl to a rack, while he tortures Peter with red-hot pokers. As Eva struggles to stand up, she accidentally drops the amulet onto Fritz's body. A few drops of Eva's blood from her wounds land on Fritz's body and the amulet. The secret of how to destroy the Baron comes to light: the Baron's victims all rise from their coffins, empowered by the magic amulet and the blood of those who raised him. The undead victims attack the Baron and rip him apart. Eva unties Peter and Karl, and the trio flees from the castle while the Baron's dying screams and Hölle's laughter echo into the night air.

== Cast ==
- Joseph Cotten as Baron Otto von Kleist/Alfred Becker
  - Franco Tocci as zombie Kleist
- Elke Sommer as Eva Arnold
- Antonio Cantafora as Peter Kleist
- Massimo Girotti as Dr. Karl Hummel
- Rada Rassimov as Christina Hoffmann/Elizabeth Hölle
- Luciano Pigozzi (as Alan Collins) as Fritz
- Umberto Raho (as Humi Raho) as Police Inspector
- Nicoletta Elmi as Gretchen Hummel
- Dieter Tressler as Mayor Dortmundt
- Rolf Hälwich as Auctioneer
- Gustavo De Nardo as Dr. Werner Hesse
- Valeria Sabel as Martha Hummel
- Pilar Castel as Madeleine, Hesse's Nurse

Credits adapted from Mario Bava: All the Colors of the Dark and Italian Gothic Horror Films, 1970-1979.

== Style and themes ==
In his analysis of the film, Danny Shipka noted how the film reflects Bava's disillusion towards society and all its members.

== Production ==
=== Development and writing ===
Baron Blood originated as a screenplay written by Vincent G. Fotre, a professional tennis player who dabbled in writing movies. The screenplay was acquired by independent producer Jerry Briskin, who showed it to Alfredo Leone in hopes he would be interested in co-producing it. Leone greatly liked the script and saw it as an opportunity to work with director Mario Bava again after their first collaboration, Four Times That Night, had turned out disastrously. Leone had turned down an offer from Bava to produce Hatchet for the Honeymoon, but felt Baron Blood to be a more appropriate vehicle for Bava. When Briskin proved unable to meet his end of the production deal, Leone took on sole control of the project. Bava initially turned down Leone's offer because one of the production associates had set the condition that the movie be filmed in one or more of the castles located in Vienna, and he was resolved to remain in Italy. However, with his career on the wane, he ultimately became resigned that a better offer than Baron Blood was unlikely to come along in the foreseeable future.

The writing credits given onscreen vary in different versions of the film. Italian prints credit the screenplay to "Wilibald Eser" and Bava. English-language releases credit the story and screenplay solely to Fotre, "adapted for the screen by" another American writer, William A. Bairn. Leone has stated that the screenplay is almost entirely Fotre's work, and Bava's contributions to it were minor, such as the addition of blood oozing under a door during the invocation sequence. Bairn served as the film's dialogue coach, but otherwise had little to do with writing the film. Eser was a German screenwriter, but his credit was fictitious; it was included to satisfy a term of the Italian–West German co-production agreement.

Baron Blood marked Bava's return to gothic horror, six years after Kill, Baby... Kill!. Leone handled the casting, though Nicoletta Elmi, who had appeared in Bava's earlier film A Bay of Blood, was cast at Bava's request. Both Vincent Price and Ray Milland were approached to play the titular role, before Joseph Cotten was cast.

=== Filming ===
The film began shooting in 1971, which included location work at the Austrian castle Burg Kreuzenstein. According to Leone, Bava was so excited by the castle's filming possibilities that when Leone told him he had secured the deal to use the castle, Bava embraced and kissed him. Other scenes were shot in the town of Klosterneuburg, and at a studio in Rome.

The film's credited cinematographer is Antonio Rinaldi, although Leone stated that Bava took over cinematography for the film, with Rinaldi handling the second unit shots. To satisfy a pre-acquisition agreement with distributor Allied Artists, most of the film's violent scenes were filmed twice, one for theatrical release and one for television, with the violence being toned down in the latter version.

One week into filming, Baron Blood faced a financial crisis as the Bank of America cancelled their agreement to discount Leone's letter of credit in response to the Nixon shock. To solve the issue, Leone flew to New York to secure $125,000 from J. Arthur Elliot and Sam Lang, the owners of the independent distribution company Cinevision Films; in exchange, Elliot and Lang received executive producer credits in the English-language version of the film, as well as the US distribution rights to Four Times That Night and Vengeance.

== Release ==
Baron Blood was released in Italy by Jumbo Cinematografica on 25 February 1972. The film grossed a total of 269,812,000 Italian lire, which Italian film historian Roberto Curti described as "mediocre". Despite being a West German co-production, the film was not released in Germany until television airings in the 1990s.

=== US release ===
After Leone turned down his pre-distribution arrangement with Allied Artists due to their intentions to book the film only as a second feature, Baron Blood was acquired for release in the United States by American International Pictures, which cut the film by ten minutes and replaced Stelvio Cipriani's score with one by Les Baxter. It was an international box office success, particularly in the U.S., owing to which producer Alfredo Leone offered Bava a contract for a new film (Lisa and the Devil) and granted him total artistic control on it.

== Critical reception ==
In contemporary reviews, Roger Ebert gave the film two stars out of four, writing, "sometimes you can enjoy horror movies because they're so bad, but Baron Blood isn't bad enough." A. H. Weiler of The New York Times gave the film a negative review, calling the title villain "bland" and stating: "Under Mario Bava's pedestrian direction, the concocted creaking, screaming, gory murders and Miss Sommer's frightened racing through dark passageways largely add up to spectral schlock".

From retrospective reviews, film critic Leonard Maltin gave the film a score of two-and-a-half stars, briefly noting "standard plot is livened by unusual settings and lighting". Daryl Loomis of DVD Verdict gave the film a mostly positive review, stating: "Baron Blood is not Mario Bava's best film, but it's far from his worst. It's bloody and full of torture, if not so full of suspense, but it's still a lot of fun." Dread Central awarded the film a score of three out of five, commenting: "Baron Blood [is] a particularly uneven piece of work; yet, Bava's eye is consistently impressive, creating swathes of Gothic imagery such as a chase sequence through fog-laden streets, sterling use of shadow in framing his antagonist, and a great location in the form of the Baron’s castle. To be expected is also the director's excellent use of lighting and primary colours, making this another rich visual experience with that distinctly European feel. While it certainly isn't anywhere near the upper echelons of Bava's filmography, it offers enough in the way of style and the gleefully macabre to keep it afloat".

On the review aggregator website Rotten Tomatoes, the film has an approval rating of 14% based on seven reviews.

== In popular culture ==
The Well to Hell hoax is an urban legend that circulated on the internet and in American tabloids in the late 1990s. The hoax was that a borehole in Russia was purportedly drilled so deep that it broke through into Hell, and that seismologists in Siberia recorded sounds in the nine-mile deep pit that included yells and haunting screams for help from sinners supposedly sent to Hell. The recording, however, was later revealed to have been a cleverly remixed portion of the soundtrack of Baron Blood, with various effects added.
