= By the Light of the Moon (novel) =

2002 novel by Dean Koontz

- Cover of By the Light of the Moon
- Author: Dean Koontz
- Cover artist: Tom Hallman
- Language: English
- Genre: Suspense, Thriller, science fiction
- Publisher: Bantam Publishing
- Publication date: 2002
- Publication place: United States
- Media type: Print (Hardback, Paperback), Audiobook (CD, Audio Cassette)
- Pages: 496 pp
- ISBN: 0-553-58276-3
- OCLC: 53453707

By the Light of the Moon is a novel by American author Dean Koontz, released in 2002.

The novel combines science fiction and suspense, following three people who are injected with nanotechnology by an amoral doctor and subsequently develop superhuman abilities. The novel deals with the topics of the ethical uses of nanotechnology, the urge to act rightly, biological hardwiring, and skepticism of those who attempt to change human nature (the latter a common theme in Koontz's novels).

Koontz said fans have often requested a sequel to the book, which he has no plans to write as of 2010 but neither has he entirely ruled out.

== Plot synopsis ==
Painter Dylan O'Conner is traveling between arts festivals with his 20-year-old autistic brother Shep. Though Shep is of high intelligence and a voracious reader, his autism manifests with difficulties communicating and a preference for rigid routines and structures. During a stay at an Arizona motel, Dylan is knocked out and tied up by a doctor, who administers 18 cc's of a golden liquid substance from a syringe with a large-bore hypodermic needle. The doctor informs Dylan the substance is psychoactive and may have unexpected effects. Jillian Jackson, a traveling comedian, is also tied up and chloroformed by the doctor before being injected with the same substance.

The O'Connors meet Jillian after escaping their bonds, only to witness the doctor's death in an explosion, while being chased by ominous men driving in large black Chevrolet Suburbans. Dylan, Shep and Jillian flee from the men, but soon begin experiencing strange events triggered by the mysterious injections. Jillian begins having premonitions of a large flock of birds, and a woman at a church. Dylan becomes psychometric, able to sense the secrets of people if he touches an object they have recently handled. Some time later, Shep reveals an ability to travel from one place to another, referred to as "folding".

Dylan feels compelled to help people after his new ability is activated, first assisting a woman whose psychopathic son has held a younger brother prisoner and subsequently helping a widower locate his long-lost granddaughter. Shep begins repeating the phrase "you do your work by the light of the moon," but Dylan and Jillian are unable to determine the phrase's meaning given Shemp atypical communication.

Dylan searches the internet and, based on some words and phrases muttered by the mysterious doctor, identifies the man as Lincoln Proctor. Proctor, a brilliant research scientist, was working on a secretive project involving nanotechnology which he intended to modify the human brain in an attempt to force a new step in human evolution.

While being pursued by the armed men driving the Suburbans, Shep folds the trio not only through space but also through time. He takes them back to ten years earlier, when his and Dylan's mother died. They'd believed she was murdered during a robbery gone wrong. Able to observe past events but not change them, they learn she was actually killed by Proctor who was seeking information hidden by their father, a lawyer who worked for a firm associated with Proctor. They also learn Shep was the primary target of the nanotechnology, as Proctor wanted to cure the boy's autism. Shep witnessed his mother's death, but was too traumatized and limited by his neurodivergent state to ever communicate about it. Shep's repeated phrase "you do your work by the light of the moon" was part of an insult his mother made towards Proctor during her final moments.

Jill's premonitions of the birds at the church grow stronger, and they realize a trio of extremists are intent on shooting innocent people at a wedding. Jill, Shep and Dylan use their newfound abilities to stop the attack, but the event earns mass publicity.

The trio reach out to overnight radio host Parish Lantern (inspired by real-life Art Bell), who had interviewed Proctor several times. But at Lantern's house they learn the radio host is waiting for them, along with Proctor. The research scientist faked his death, and injected Parish with the same golden liquid days earlier. The radio host developed precognitive powers and had anticipated the trio's arrival. The ominous men in SUVs are revealed to be mercenaries hired by the wealthy business executives who funded Proctor's research but later decided to eliminate him, fearing costly lawsuits from the nanotech injections. Shep, seeking revenge for his mother's death, folds to the North Pole with Proctor and leaves him to die.

Shep, Dylan and Jill agree to stay with Lantern at his Lake Tahoe estate, where they can avoid public attention while they plan to use their newfound abilities to help people in need.
