= Mike McGee (gallery director) =

Mike McGee is an American curator, art writer, educator, and arts administrator. He is the gallery director for the Nicholas and Lee Begovich Gallery at California State University, Fullerton (CSUF) in Fullerton, California.

== Biography ==
He is the co-founder of the CSUF Grand Central Art Center in 1994, and was interim acting director in 2011 for the CSUF Grand Central Art Center. McGee has been professor of the Masters program in Exhibition Design and Museum Studies at CSUF for the past 22 years. McGee has served as a board member for Arts Orange County, OCCCA, CSUF Grand Central Art Center and is an Arts Commissioner for the City of Santa Ana.

He had polycystic kidney disease and underwent a kidney transplant in 2008.

== Publications ==
McGee has written major essays for several exhibitions, including:

- "Mark Ryden: Bunnies and Bees", Porterhouse Fine Arts Editions and GCP, 2002
- "100 Artists See Satan", Grand Central Press, 2004, co-published by Last Gasp, San Francisco, CA
- "John Paul Jones-A retrospective", Grand Central Press, 2009
- "The Saddest Place on Earth-The Art of Camille Rose Garcia", Grand Central Press, 2006, co-published by Last Gasp, San Francisco, CA
- "Charles Kraff's Villa Delirium", Grand Central Press, 2002, co-published by Last Gasp, San Francisco, CA
- "Allegedly - Hugh Brown, Status Factory",
- "The Art of Ron English, in process
- "Mel's Hole" Grand Central Press, 2008, co-published by Last Gasp, San Francisco, CA
- "Thomas Kinkade- Heaven on Earth", Grand Central Press, 2004, co-published by Last Gasp, San Francisco, CA
- "Jan de Swart,
- "As Above So Below", Grand Central Press, 2004
- "Mark Ryden. Pinxit", Taschen, 2012
- "G. Ray Kerciu Radical Retrospective", Grand Central Press, 2013, co-published by CSU Fullerton, Begovich Gallery

He is also a contributing writer to "The Curiosities of Janice Lowry", Grand Central Press, 2011 and "Suggestivism", Gingko Press and Grand Central Press, 2011
