= KNYE =

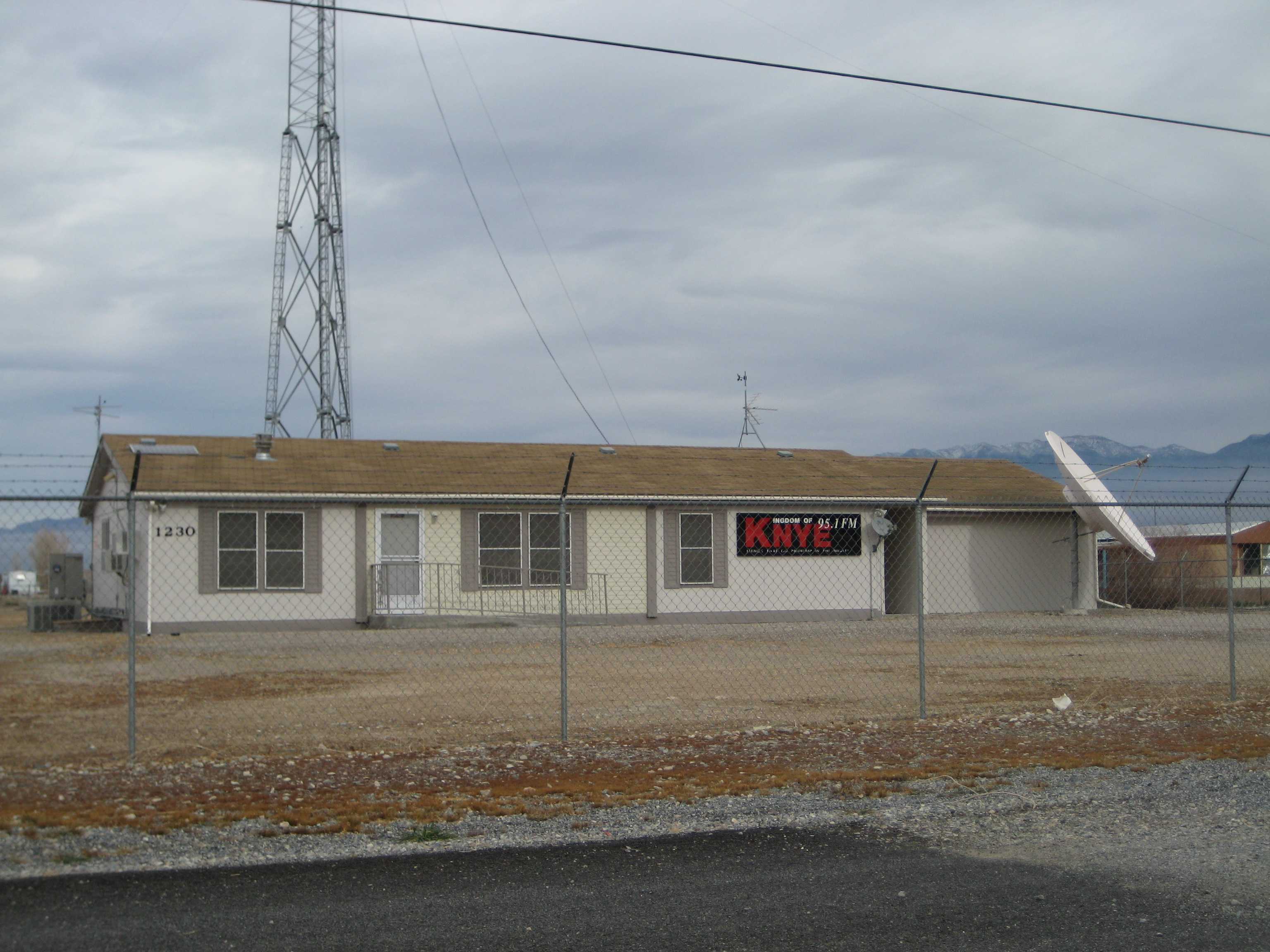
- Pahrump, Nevada; United States
- Frequency: 95.1 MHz
- Branding: KNYE 95.1 The Kingdom of Nye

Programming
- Format: Oldies
- Affiliations: Premiere Networks

Ownership
- Owner: Karen Jackson; (Pahrump Radio, Inc.)

History
- First air date: 2002
- Call sign meaning: "Kingdom of Nye"

Technical information
- Licensing authority: FCC
- Facility ID: 78350
- Class: A
- ERP: 6,000 watts
- HAAT: −28.2 meters (−93 ft)
- Transmitter coordinates: 36°11′51.8″N 116°2′11.0″W

Links
- Public license information: Public file; LMS
- Website: knye.com

KNYE (95.1 MHz) is a commercial radio station in Pahrump, Nevada, airing an eclectic mix of oldies most of the day. The syndicated talk show Coast to Coast AM is heard every night. KNYE is owned by Karen Jackson, with the license held by Pahrump Radio, Inc.

== History ==
The station was founded in 2002 by Art Bell. Bell was the founder and original host of Coast to Coast AM, which became a nationally syndicated all-night radio show across the U.S. and Canada. Bell often did the program from Pahrump. The station was created as a personal project, with Bell's broadcast studio and transmitter located on his home's property. The station was created to serve the local Pahrump community and ran an oldies format, often commercial-free for periods as a "thank you to Pahrump" from Bell.

On May 29, 2008, Art Bell sold the station to Jackson for a reported $600,000, with Jackson continuing the station's focus on community service. The station promotes local efforts such as food fundraisers, coat drives, and school supply drives.
