= Art Bell =

American broadcaster and author (1945–2018)

- Born: Arthur William Bell III; June 17, 1945; Jacksonville, North Carolina, U.S
- Died: April 13, 2018 (aged 72); Pahrump, Nevada, U.S.
- Occupations: Broadcaster; author
- Spouses: Sachiko Toguchi Pontius (m. 1965; div. 1968) Vickie L. Baker (m. 1981; div. 1991) Ramona Lee Hayes (m. 1991; died 2006) Airyn Ruiz (m. 2006)
- Children: 5
- Call sign: W6OBB (U.S.); 4F1AB (Philippines)
- Website: artbell.com

Arthur William Bell III (June 17, 1945 – April 13, 2018) was an American broadcaster and author. He was the founder and the original host of the paranormal-themed radio program Coast to Coast AM, which is syndicated on hundreds of radio stations in the United States and Canada. He also created and hosted its companion show Dreamland. Coast to Coast still airs nightly, now hosted weeknights by George Noory. Bell's past shows from 1994 to 2002 are repeated on Premiere Networks on Saturday evenings. They are retitled Somewhere in Time with Art Bell.

In 2003, Bell partially retired from Coast to Coast AM. During the following four years, he hosted the show for many weekends on Premiere Networks. He announced his retirement from weekend hosting in 2007, but occasionally served as a guest host through 2010. He started a new nightly show, Art Bell's Dark Matter, on Sirius XM Radio, that aired for six weeks in 2013.

In 2015, he returned to radio with a new show Midnight in the Desert, which was available online via TuneIn as well as some terrestrial radio stations. He retired on December 11, 2015, citing security concerns at his home in Pahrump, Nevada, west of Las Vegas.

Bell was the founder and original owner of Pahrump-based radio station KNYE 95.1 FM. His broadcast studio and transmitter were located near his home, where he also hosted Coast to Coast AM.

== Early life ==
Bell was born in North Carolina. Sources differ on whether he was born in Jacksonville or Camp Lejeune. Both of his parents served in the United States military. He had a Lutheran background.

Bell was always interested in radio; at the age of 13, he became a licensed amateur radio operator. Bell held an Amateur Extra Class license, which is the top U.S. Federal Communications Commission license class. His call sign was W6OBB.

In the 1960s Bell underwent basic training at Lackland Air Force Base and served in the U.S. Air Force for four years as a medic during the Vietnam War. Although not involved in combat, he was stationed for a short time at a hospital in Da Nang. At this hospital and others, such as Clark Air Base in the Philippines, he witnessed the effects of the war first-hand, something he did not like to recall or talk about.

While in the military, Bell, with a few friends on base, operated a pirate radio station at Amarillo Air Force Base. After receiving support from the base commander, they expanded the operation, playing music for the entire base; the signal was strong enough to be picked up in the city of Amarillo. When local radio stations learned of the pirate station's popularity after it appeared in the Arbitron ratings, it was forced to shut down after being on the air for a year. This was the start of Bell's radio career.

After leaving military service in 1966, Bell worked at several radio stations in the States before moving to Okinawa, where he was a disc jockey for six years at KSBK, the only non-military English-language station in Japan. While there, he claimed to set two "world records", first by staying on the air without sleep for five days and nights (115 hours and 15 minutes). He later wrote that this extreme sleep deprivation was a strange experience and something he would never do again. He said that as he went about his normal routine, such as walking to the refrigerator during a break, it was as if he was "floating around in a different world", and things seemed "unreal". The second "world record" he claimed to set was for the longest continuous broadcast while seesawing, after seesawing for 57 hours while broadcasting.

Bell soon returned to the United States, where he had a career in rock music radio for the next 20 years.

While working at a rock music station in Anchorage, Alaska, he learned about Amerasian children stranded in Saigon in the final days before the U.S. withdrew from Vietnam in 1975. He spoke about it on-air and listeners in Alaska started to send in donations. The money raised allowed the chartering of a Douglas DC-8 to fly to Vietnam and rescue approximately 120 orphans. They were brought to the United States and adopted by American families.

== Broadcasting career ==
Bell was a rock music disc jockey before he moved into talk radio. His original 1978 late-night Las Vegas program on KDWN was a political call-in show under the name West Coast AM. In 1988, Bell and Alan Corbeth renamed the show Coast to Coast AM and moved its broadcast from the Plaza Hotel in Las Vegas to Bell's home in Pahrump.

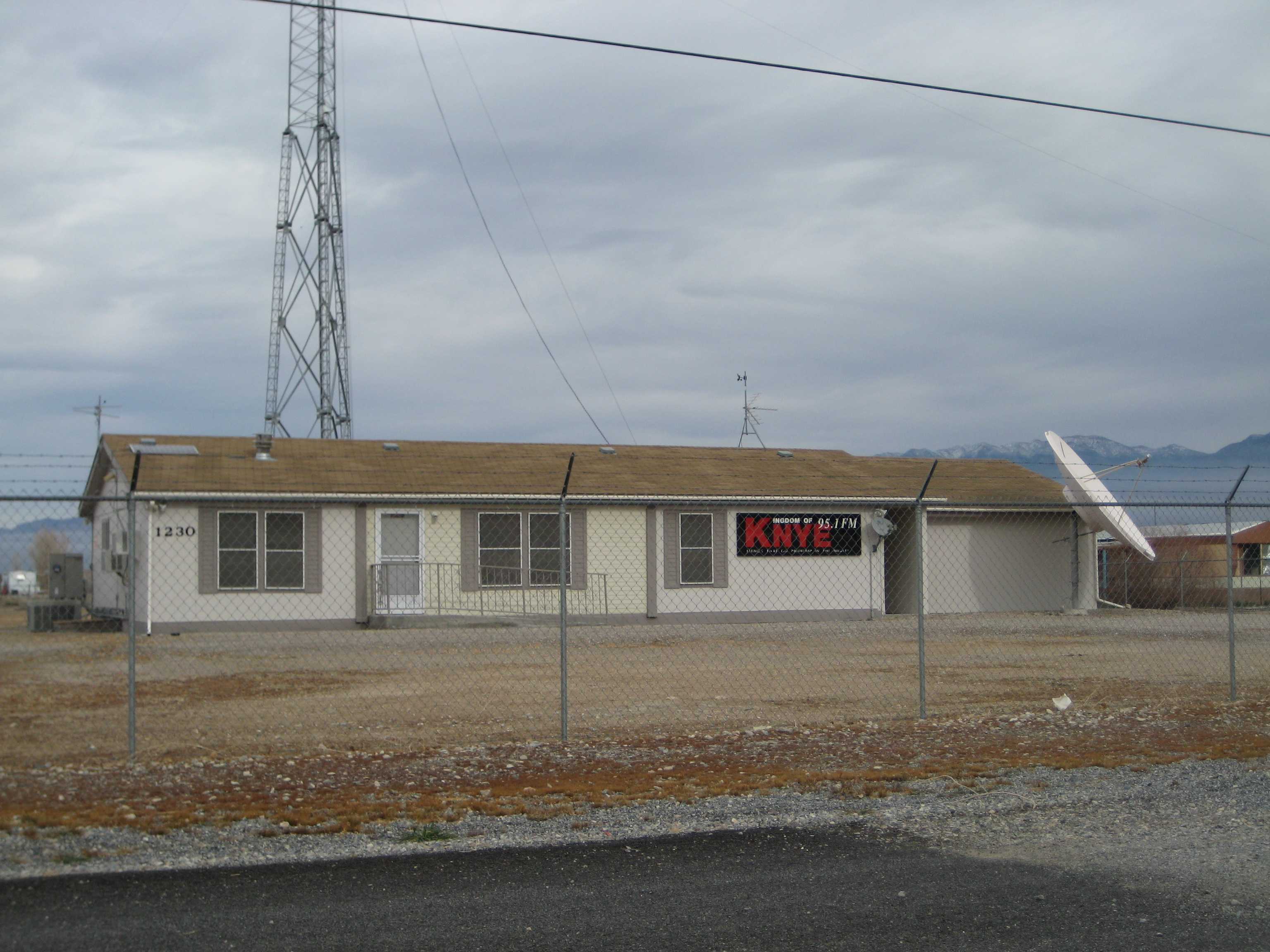
Broadcast facilities of KNYE in Pahrump, Nevada

Bell abandoned conventional political talk in favor of topics such as gun control and conspiracy theories, leading to a significant increase in his overnight ratings. The show's focus again shifted significantly after the Oklahoma City bombing in 1995. Many in the media did not want to be blamed for inciting anti-government or militia actions like the bombing. Subsequently, Bell discussed offbeat topics such as the paranormal, the occult, UFOs, protoscience and pseudoscience. During his tenure at KDWN Bell met and married his third wife, Ramona, who later handled production and management duties for the program.

An article in the February 23, 1997, edition of The Washington Post said that Bell was currently America's highest-rated late-night radio talk show host, broadcast on 328 stations. According to The Oregonian in its June 22, 1997, edition, Coast to Coast AM with Art Bell was on 460 stations. At its initial peak in popularity, Coast to Coast AM was syndicated on more than 500 radio stations and claimed 15 million listeners nightly. Bell's studios were located in his home in the town of Pahrump, located in Nye County, Nevada; hence, the voice-over catchphrase, "from the Kingdom of Nye".

=== Critical reputation ===
Fans regarded Bell as a master showman, noting that he called his show "absolute entertainment" and expressly said he did not necessarily accept every guest or caller's claims, but only offered a forum where they would not be openly ridiculed. Bell was one of the few talk show hosts who did not screen incoming calls, but this changed in 2006.

Ed Dames, Richard C. Hoagland, Terence McKenna, Dannion Brinkley, David John Oates, and Robert Bigelow were all regular guests. Some of Bell's regular guests continue to appear on Coast to Coast AM now hosted by George Noory.

Bell's own interests, however, extended beyond the paranormal. He interviewed singers Crystal Gayle, Willie Nelson, Merle Haggard, Eric Burdon and Gordon Lightfoot, comedian George Carlin, writer Dean Koontz, hard science fiction writer Greg Bear, X-Files writer/creator Chris Carter, TV talk host Regis Philbin, Star Trek actor Leonard Nimoy, actor Dan Aykroyd, former Luftwaffe pilot Bruno Stolle, actress Jane Seymour, actress Ellen Muth, actor and TV host Robert Stack, human rights lawyer John Loftus, legendary disc jockey Casey Kasem, UFC commentator Joe Rogan and frequent guests physicist Michio Kaku and SETI astronomers Seth Shostak and H. Paul Shuch.

Beginning in late 1996, Bell was criticized for reporting rumors that Comet Hale–Bopp was being trailed by a UFO. Some speculated that members of the Heaven's Gate group committed mass suicide based on rumors Bell aired. Others dismissed the idea, noting that the Heaven's Gate website stated: "Whether Hale-Bopp has a 'companion' or not is irrelevant from our perspective." Susan Wright reported that later, Bell was also "one of the first to publicize expert opinions refuting the 'alien' companion" said to have been shadowing Hale-Bopp, such as that published in 1998 from the Jet Propulsion Laboratory suggesting that "the satellite's main diameter is ~30 km," (20 miles) and accordingly natural rather than artificial.

=== Notable callers and guests ===
Though best known for discussing conspiracy theories and paranormal topics, Bell's interests and interviews were wide-ranging. He interviewed musicians Willie Nelson, Crystal Gayle, and Merle Haggard; science fiction author Jerry Pournelle; and comedians George Carlin and Joe Rogan. Author Dean Koontz was a fan of Coast to Coast AM, being interviewed on January 22, 2002 to promote his horror-suspense novel One Door Away from Heaven, which featured a brief reference to Bell. Koontz's 2002 novel By the Light of the Moon has a supporting character named Parish Lantern, described as the deep-voiced host of an overnight call-in show which discusses extraterrestrials.

Bell had several semi-regular guests, including theoretical physicist Michio Kaku; controversial Catholic priest Malachi Martin; journalists George Knapp and Linda Moulton Howe; conspiracy theorist Richard C. Hoagland, and self-proclaimed remote viewer Ed Dames.

On August 15, 1996, Bell interviewed William Luther Pierce, author of the novel The Turner Diaries. Pierce, writing under the pseudonym "Andrew Macdonald", depicted a race war leading to the extermination of Jews, non-whites and homosexuals. Pierce denounced interracial marriage, calling white people who married non-whites "traitors to the white race". Bell agreed with Pierce on the dangers of politicians abusing their power, but rejected Pierce's racist views. Bell also interviewed neo-nazi Tom Metzger, and mentioned his Filipino wife: "'I am married to a brown-skinned Asian woman. What does that make me?' To which Metzger replied, 'A traitor to your race.'"

One of Bell's most famous Coast to Coast interviews occurred in 1997 with a man who identified himself as Mel Waters and discussed what is known as "Mel's Hole" in rural Washington. The opening is said to be a fantastically deep vertical shaft which possesses bizarre properties. No such hole has ever been physically located by anyone attempting to verify this story.

A caller in 2000 named "Daniel Murray" claimed he was a Majestic Agent from Downey, California. This call served as the inspiration for the alternate reality game Majestic.

A caller in September 1997 claimed he had discovered an unknown threat and conspiracy from Area 51, and his life was in danger by even talking about it. For unknown reasons, Bell lost connection to his transmitter during the call and, just as the caller's voice became more and more agitated, the entire broadcast dramatically went silent. A confused Bell restored the signal about 20 minutes later. The caller (or someone sounding similar) called in on a subsequent show and admitted it had been an elaborate hoax, which fooled many.

== Retirements and comebacks ==
Bell retired and returned to Coast to Coast AM several times.

On October 13, 1998, Bell announced his first retirement, which was highly unexpected by his listeners. He spoke of "an event, a threatening terrible event occurred to my family, which I could not tell you about. Because of that event, and a succession of other events, what you're listening to right now is my final broadcast on the air." Hilly Rose filled in after Bell's departure. Bell returned on October 28, 1998, asserting that the brief departure was brought on by threats made against his family. On May 29, 1999, Bell explained that this retirement was due to an allegation made by hosts of WWCR shortwave radio that Bell had paid to cover up a criminal indictment. The facts of the matter became public knowledge in 2000, when the media revealed that an actual criminal indictment was filed against a person who had assaulted a member of Bell's family. Because of the nature of the crime, Bell had wanted to keep the matter private. Ted Gunderson, the former head of the Los Angeles FBI and the hosts at WWCR shortwave radio had accused Bell of the crime. Bell responded by taking legal action against Gunderson, as well as the hosts and stations. The action was resolved in a settlement in 2000.

On April 1, 2000, Bell again announced his retirement. He said that the event would occur on April 26, 2000, but offered no details other than expressing intentions to "resolve a family crisis." On April 11, 2000, Mike Siegel was introduced as the new host of Coast to Coast AM, taking over on April 27, to an estimated audience of 22 million listeners. The media later explained that Bell had left to deal with the aftermath of the kidnap and sexual assault of his son. Brian Lepley, a substitute teacher, was convicted of sexual assault and attempted transmission of HIV and was sentenced to 10 to 25 years. Bell returned to Coast to Coast AM in February 2001. Bell noted that since his departure the show had lost a number of affiliates, commercial content had risen to an unbearable level, and Siegel had taken the program in a "different direction" of which Bell disapproved. Bell retained some authority over the program as its creator and felt his return was necessary.

On October 23, 2002, Bell announced that he would retire again due to recurring back pain, which was the result of a fall from a telephone pole during his youth. Bell was replaced by George Noory as weekday host of Coast to Coast AM on January 1, 2003. Those close to the matter also said that Barbara Simpson would host weekends and that Bell planned to be an occasional guest host for Noory. Bell returned in September 2003 as a weekend host, replacing Barbara Simpson and Ian Punnett as host of the Saturday and Sunday evening broadcasts. In June 2005, he scaled this schedule back, calling it a "semiretirement," and hosted only the last two Sundays of every month. Bell went back to hosting every weekend show as his schedule permitted after his wife Ramona's death a few months later.

On July 1, 2007, Bell announced his retirement, stating that he wished to spend more time with his new wife and daughter. He made it explicit that, unlike the circumstances surrounding previous retirements, this decision was entirely positive and joyful and that he would not disappear completely, announcing an intention to occasionally substitute for other hosts and host "special" shows.

On December 11, 2015, Bell posted what would be his final retirement message via his Facebook page. He cited safety concerns for his family by saying "if one of them were harmed because of what I love doing my life would be over." Throughout the fall, Bell reported several incidents where an unknown number of armed trespassers came onto his property, sometimes firing gunshots. These events have been said to occur during or around the time of his broadcasting. This announcement came a mere five months after the start of his most recent show, Midnight in the Desert.

== Events of 2006 ==
=== Death of Ramona Bell ===
On January 5, 2006, Ramona Bell, his wife of 15 years, died unexpectedly at the age of 47 of what appeared to be an acute asthma attack in Laughlin, Nevada, where the couple had been taking a short vacation.

During the January 22 broadcast of Coast to Coast AM, Bell described in great detail the events surrounding his wife's death. For weeks thereafter, callers to the station would speak to George Noory and express their sadness and sympathy for Bell; Noory had taken Bell's place on weekdays beginning in 2002.

=== Change in schedule ===
On January 21, 2006, 16 days after the unexpected death of his wife Ramona, Bell announced he would host Coast to Coast AM every Saturday and Sunday evening, and that former weekend host Ian Punnett would work a new live prefeed program for the four hours preceding Bell's slot on Saturday nights (9:00 pm – 1:00 am ET).

=== Return to "the High Desert and the Great American Southwest" ===
Bell opened his December 28, 2006, program by disclosing that he had just relocated back from the Philippines to Pahrump, Nevada, with his wife Airyn.

== Events of 2008 ==
On May 29, 2008, Bell sold KNYE to station manager Karen Jackson.

On September 8, 2008, Noory stated that he would be hosting the annual Ghost to Ghost AM Halloween call-in show rather than Bell, who normally returned to Coast to Coast to host it (along with the New Year's prediction shows).

On November 30, 2008, Bell hosted Coast to Coast AM. Michio Kaku was the guest. This was the first time Bell had hosted the show since May 23, 2008.

Bell was inducted into the National Radio Hall of Fame in 2008.

== Events of 2009 ==
Bell was scheduled to return to Coast to Coast AM on April 24, 2009, to host an evening of open lines, but because of engineering problems in Manila, Bell was rescheduled to a later date.

On May 17, 2009, Bell returned to host Coast to Coast AM live from Manila. His guest was professor Peter Ward. Topics of discussion were mass extinctions, Earth's "self-destructive" phenomena, and life beyond planet Earth. While on the air, Bell answered an email question from a listener who asked why he was in the Philippines again and how long he would be there. Bell replied that he would address it on "Friday" and hinted that his move might be permanent.

As of May 20, 2009, the Coast to Coast website listed that Bell would be filling in for George Noory on Friday, May 22, 2009, to interview Bob Koontz. However, Bell did not host that show. The Coast to Coast website, again, cited technical difficulties in Manila and that his interview would be postponed. Bell interviewed Koontz on Saturday, June 6, 2009.

Friday June 26, 2009, Bell hosted Coast to Coast AM from Manila with guest Dean Radin. He also commented on the death of Michael Jackson and how he had lived in Pahrump, Nevada, not far from Bell's residence.

Friday November 20, 2009, Bell hosted Coast to Coast AM from Manila with guest Starfire Tor, psi researcher and experiencer who discussed time shifts and time slips, and other strange occurrences of time. During the first 90 minutes, they were joined by Whitley Strieber, who shared his take on Tor's research.

On Wednesday, December 30, and Thursday, December 31, 2009, Bell once again hosted his annual New Year's predictions special of Coast to Coast, noting that a number of the predictions this year were of an unusual and interesting nature and not mere repeats of many that had come before, though he also took several callers to task for seemingly veiling their obvious political agendas or wishes in the form of predictions, rather than offering something from their "psychic center", which is what he repeatedly asks for during the prediction show. He also suggested that perhaps Coast to Coast AM should institute some sort of prize or acknowledgment for listeners whose predictions are particularly accurate or astute.

=== Immigration controversy ===
In late 2008, Bell and his wife filed an I-751 petition with the United States Citizenship and Immigration Services as part of her marriage-based green card process. In early 2009 the USCIS responded that they would need additional evidence to prove that Bell's marriage to a Philippine national and subsequent green card application was in good faith. Bell responded with evidence including their marriage license, their daughter's birth certificate, Bell's last will and testament, bank records, family photos, and Social Security forms. Bell sent the package to the USCIS by return receipt mail, and he subsequently received the return receipt stamped "USCIS RECEIVED JAN-15-09."

On March 10, 2009, Bell and his wife and daughter left Nevada for Manila to deal with some family business, including the disposition of a condo they owned. Shortly thereafter, the USCIS denied the application on the grounds that the documentary evidence was never received, and further stipulated that Airyn Bell is not permitted to re-enter the United States, which is why Bell remained in the Philippines. Moreover, since the Bells were out of the country when the application was denied, they were required to start the process over.

== Events of 2010–2015 ==
Bell hosted ten episodes in 2010, five short of his publicly announced, contractually specified quota of 15 shows per year. The last episode he hosted that year was his annual Ghost to Ghost show on Halloween night.

As of December 2010, Bell was no longer listed as a host on the Coast to Coast website, his shows were no longer searchable under his name, and the only references to Bell on the site were of a historical or archival nature. However, the weekly Somewhere in Time with Art Bell broadcasts of classic Bell-hosted episodes (which have aired before the live show on Saturday nights since 2006) were not discontinued.

In email interactions with fans who wrote in to inquire about Bell's absence, Coast personnel confirmed that Bell had retired. "Art Bell decided he no longer wished to do live C2C shows, and asked that his name be removed from the host listings accordingly," said Coast webmaster Lex Lonehood. "Classics and Somewhere in Time shows will continue as is."

Despite the remarks from Punnett, Noory, Lyon, Lonehood, and Bell, as of January 6, 2011, an official public statement formally confirming Bell's departure from Coast to Coast AM had not been made via press release, website announcement or on-air, by the show's producers, Premier Radio Networks, Clear Channel Communications, or Bell himself. On July 20, 2011, Bell announced via his Facebook page that he had relocated with his family to Pahrump, Nevada. On November 1, 2012, Bell updated his Facebook status with the following: "I wish my name was no longer associated with what Coast has become!"

=== Return to radio in 2013 ===
Bell returned to the airwaves on September 16, 2013. His new show Art Bell's Dark Matter was broadcast on SiriusXM satellite radio's Indie Talk channel (channel #104), Monday through Thursday from 7 PM to 11 PM PT with repeats during the remainder of the night and "best of" shows airing on Fridays. On November 4, 2013, Bell left Dark Matter after only six weeks.

=== Midnight in the Desert radio show ===
On July 20, 2015, Bell returned with his new show Midnight in the Desert. The show aired on the internet Dark Matter Digital network and on 45 stations (20 of which signed on before the show started) from 9 p.m. to midnight PT. He also started transmitting on shortwave radio over WTWW on 5.085 MHz as well.

On December 11, 2015, Bell permanently stepped down as host of Midnight in the Desert due to concerns about his family's safety. He had reported multiple instances of someone shooting firearms at and near his property in the fall of 2015. The show Midnight in the Desert continued with new host Heather Wade, with Bell making the occasional guest host appearance. Shortly after Bell's death, Dave Schrader became the host.

== Death ==
In July 2016, Bell posted via a blog that he was hospitalized for pneumonia and revealed that he suffered from chronic obstructive pulmonary disease.

On April 13, 2018, at age 72, Art Bell died at his home in Pahrump, Nevada.

On April 16, 2018, a few days later, George Noory, current host of Coast to Coast AM, announced Bell's death, and while struggling to keep his composure stated: "Art and I were not that close. We had our differences, but he was one of those instrumental in me being where I am right now."

On August 1, 2018, four months later, the Las Vegas Review-Journal reported the Clark County coroner's office findings. The coroner's office stated that Bell had died of an accidental overdose from a cocktail of prescription drugs. The coroner's office determined he had four prescription medications in his system: the opioid oxycodone, aka Roxicet; the opioid hydrocodone, aka Vicodin; diazepam aka Valium; and carisoprodol, aka Soma, a muscle-relaxant. Chronic obstructive pulmonary disease and hypertension also contributed to his death.

== Amateur radio ==
Bell became a licensed amateur radio operator at the age of 13. His first call sign was KN3JOX, first listed in the Winter 1959 edition of the Radio Amateur Callbook. He soon upgraded to K3JOX, and he later held W2CKS, first listed in the Spring 1967 Callbook. Bell held an Amateur Extra Class license, which is the highest U.S. Federal Communications Commission amateur license class. His call sign was W6OBB.

Bell passed the Philippines amateur radio exams and became a Philippine Class A amateur radio operator with the call sign of 4F1AB. While in the Philippines, Bell was active on 40–10 meters, as well as 144.6 MHz simplex in Manila.

== Honors ==
In August 2006 Art was inducted into the Nevada Broadcasters Association Hall of Fame. He did not attend the presentation.

On March 10, 2007, Bell was honored with the News/Talk Radio Lifetime Achievement Award from the trade publication Radio & Records in Los Angeles.

Bell was inducted into the National Radio Hall of Fame in 2008.

== Marriages ==
- Sachiko Toguchi Bell Pontius, married 1965; divorced 1968. Children: Vincent Pontius and Lisa Pontius Minei.
- Vickie L. Baker, married March 1, 1981; divorced July 3, 1991. Children: Arthur William Bell IV.
- Ramona Lee Hayes, married August 4, 1991; died January 5, 2006 (see Death of Ramona Bell).
- Airyn Ruiz, married April 5, 2006; remained married until Bell's death on April 13, 2018. Children: Asia Rayne Bell and Alexander William Bell.

== Written works ==
Bell authored or co-authored several books:

- Bell, Art; Osborn, Jennifer L. (1995). The Art of Talk. New Orleans, LA: Paper Chase Press. ISBN 978-1-879706-53-8. – An autobiography
- Bell, Art; Osborn, Jennifer L. (1997). The Quickening: Today's Trends, Tomorrow's World. New Orleans, LA: Paper Chase Press. ISBN 978-1-879706-70-5.
- Bell, Art; Steiger, Brad (1999). The Source: Journey Through the Unexplained. New Orleans, LA: Paper Chase Press. ISBN 978-1-879706-50-7.
- Strieber, Whitley; Bell, Art (1999). The Edge: Man's Mysterious Past & Incredible Future. New Orleans, LA: Paper Chase Press. ISBN 978-1-879706-51-4.
- Bell, Art; Strieber, Whitley (1999). The Coming Global Superstorm. New York: Pocket Books. ISBN 978-0-671-04190-8. – Warning of sudden climate change; the book inspired the 2004 film The Day After Tomorrow

== Other work ==
In 1996, Bell appeared in an episode of the NBC science fiction series Dark Skies as William S. Paley, head of CBS.

On September 30, 1998, NBC's Today Show aired a taped segment of reporter Fred Francis interviewing Bell. Francis questioned Bell about Hale-Bopp, Area 51, eccentric callers claiming to be "six-fingered alien hybrids", and the UFO sighting experienced by Bell and his wife Ramona.

In 1999, Bell appeared as himself on the series Millennium. The episode called "Collateral Damage" aired in the third season and dealt with a former U.S. soldier who claimed the government he fought for was indeed responsible for horrendous tests on soldiers and Iraqi civilians. (This episode was broadcast on January 22, 1999. The Washington Post, January 22, 1999.) In 1999 Bell was interviewed on Larry King Live. (This was broadcast on March 5, 1999. The Washington Post, March 5, 1999.)

Progressive rock band Tool's 2001 album, Lateralus, featured a track entitled "Faaip de Oiad" (Enochian for "The Voice of God"), which includes a clip of the "distraught and terrified" Area 51 employee call from September 11, 1997.

In 2005, Bell and then-wife Ramona were featured on the ABC News special Peter Jennings Reporting: UFOs – Seeing Is Believing, which reported on the entire scope of the UFO experience, from the first sighting by Kenneth Arnold in 1947 to the present day. (This was broadcast on February 24, 2005. The Washington Post, 2–20–05.)

In 2005, snippets of Bell and callers to his show were featured on the song "Conspiracy Radio" on Sean Hogan's album Catalina Sunrise: Bell is credited for "voice-overs" on this track.

In 2006, Bell was featured in the video game Prey and played himself. He hosts, as in real life, Coast to Coast AM, and the player is able to listen to the broadcast at several terminals throughout the game. The broadcasts describe what is happening on Earth as the game unfolds. The game plot centers on a massive spaceship and alien abductions. Bell receives a number of calls about people who have seen smaller craft as they abduct people.

In 2007, Bell appeared as himself in the movie I Know Who Killed Me.

Bell appeared alongside Mark Arnold in the 2016 film titled Abduct, directed by Ilyas Kaduji and produced by Mafalda Sa. Bell plays himself as he and a group of friends try to help protect a young woman from an alien threat.
