= Michael Magee =

Michael or Mike Magee may refer to:

- Michael Magee (actor) (1929–2011), Canadian actor and author
- Mickey McGee (1947–2020), American drummer
- Mike Magee (journalist) (born 1949), British journalist
- Michael Magee (c. 1957–1972), casualty during the Battle at Springmartin, Northern Ireland
- Michael Magee (mathematician), Northern Irish mathematician
- Mike Magee (soccer) (born 1984), American Major League Soccer player
- Michael Magee (writer) (born 1990), novelist from Northern Ireland

== See also ==
- Michael McGee (disambiguation)
