= Desert Lighthouse =

Full-size functioning lighthouse in the Mojave Desert near Hinkley, California

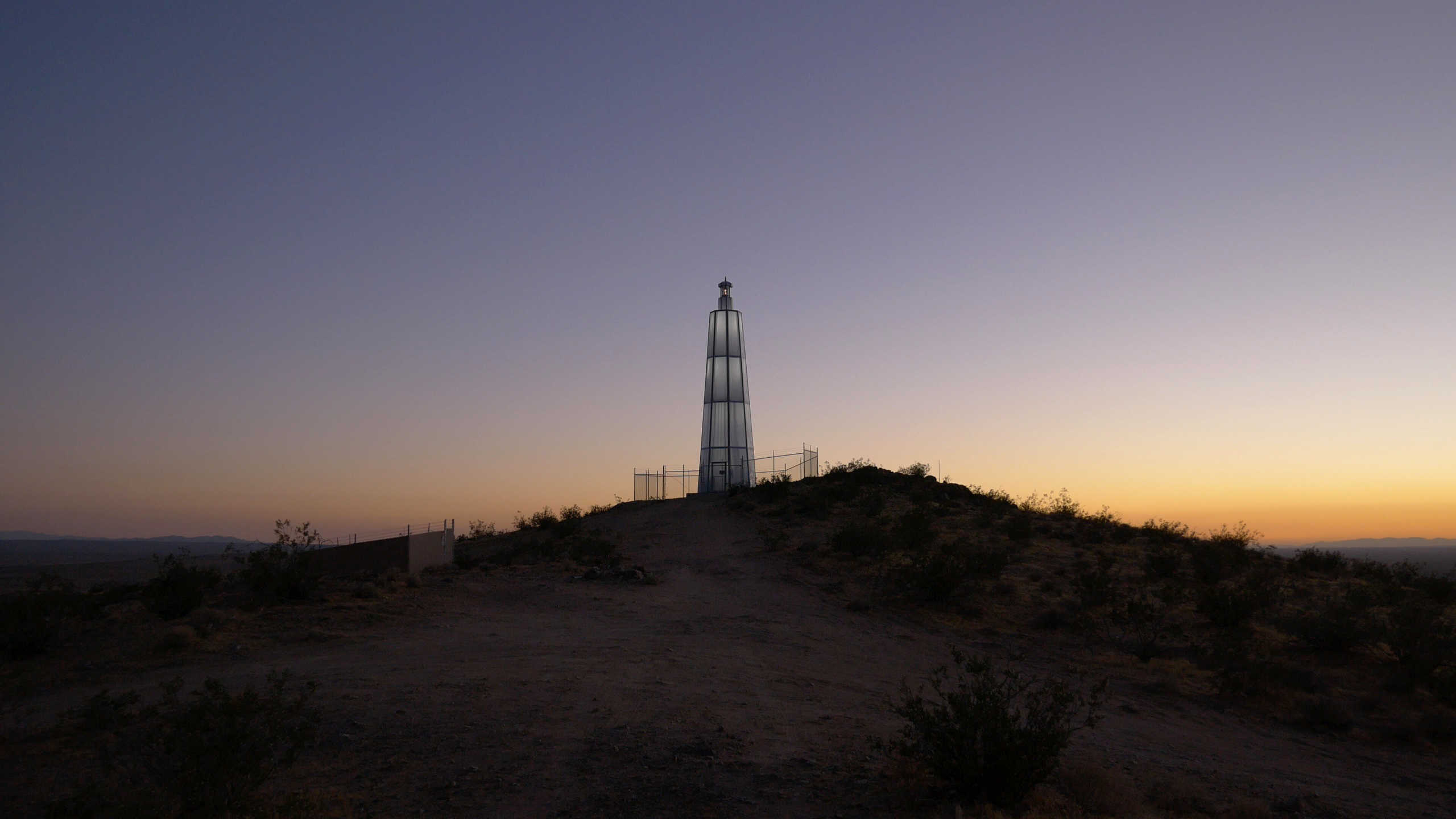
- The Desert Lighthouse at sunset in July 2017.
- Location: Hinkley, California
- Coordinates: 34°57′27.0″N 117°12′45.7″W

Tower
- Constructed: 2017
- Construction: Steel & Polycarbonate Paneling
- Height: 50-foot (15 m)
- Shape: Octagonal

Light
- Lens: TRB220
- Range: 10 nautical miles (19 km; 12 mi)

Desert Lighthouse is a full-size functioning lighthouse in the Mojave Desert near Hinkley, California, United States. It was built in 2017 by artist Daniel Hawkins after nearly 10 years of planning and unexpected setbacks.

== Background ==
Sometime after 2010, Hawkins had previously built a lighthouse nearby in the Lucerne Valley area of the Mojave Desert but it was subsequently destroyed and dismantled by vandals and scavengers. In 2014, Hawkins presented an exhibition title "Desert Lighthouse Ultimatum" at the University of California, Riverside's Culver Center for the Arts Museum. The theme of his exhibition was the return of his effort to establish a permanent lighthouse in the Mojave Desert. Three years later on July 1, 2017 the Desert Lighthouse was unveiled to the public during an evening "Launch Event".

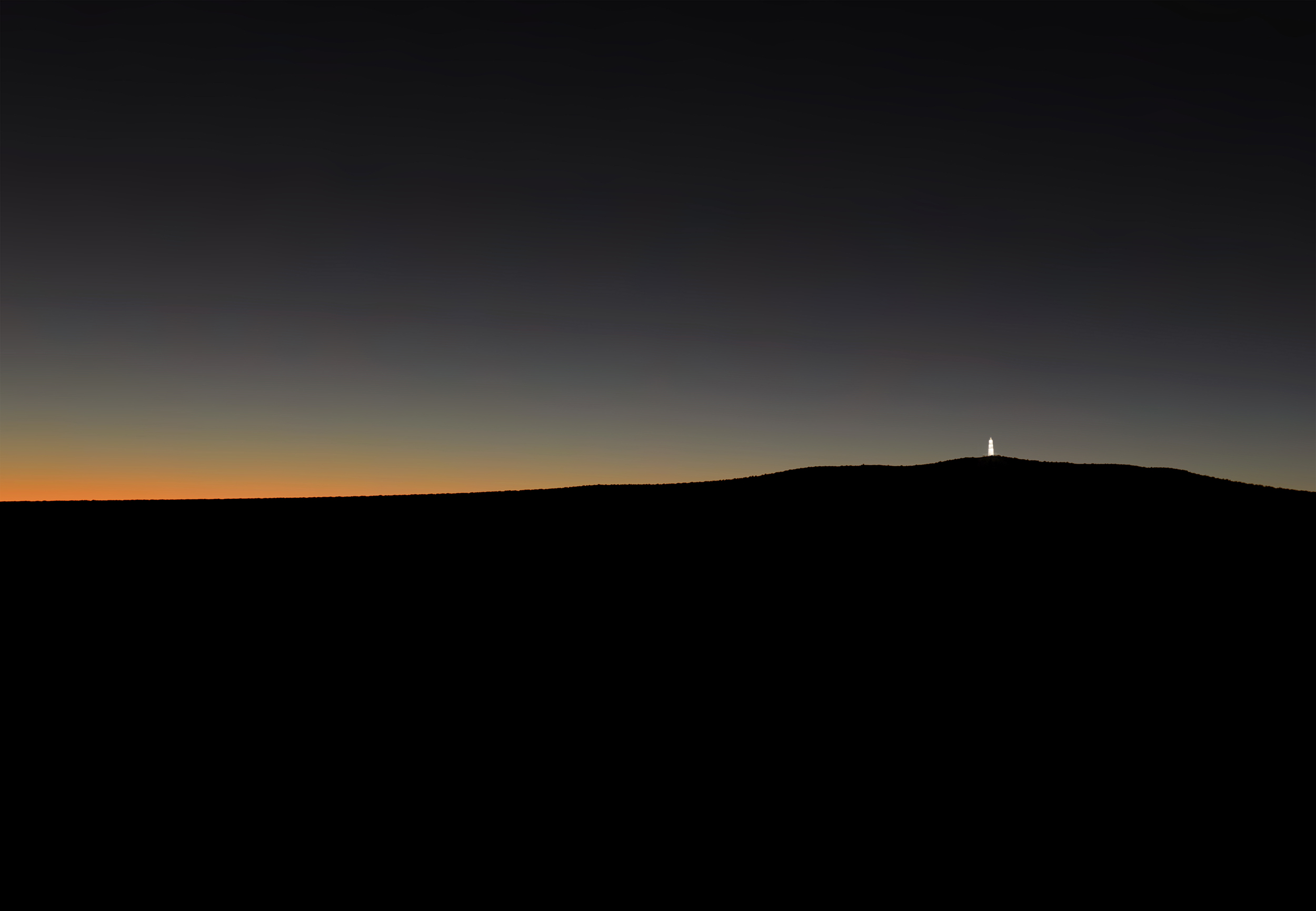
Desert Lighthouse fully illuminated.

== Reviews ==
Art critic Doug Harvey referred to the Desert Lighthouse as, "...one of the most complex and coherent translations of 1960s and ’70s Land Art into a 21st-century context. Hawkins’s most recent Desert Lighthouse embodies both the doomed, abject heroics of Robert Smithson and company, and a post-apocalyptic, DIY absurdism that has already made it a populist icon among the survivalist locals."

== Memorial ==
In late 2018, a small group of makeshift memorials were left by visitors near the base of the lighthouse in memory of their passed loved ones. Since then the memorials have grown in size. Two identified memorials are: Bruce Mace and Alicia Maria Hilton. The memorial was later expanded in late 2019.

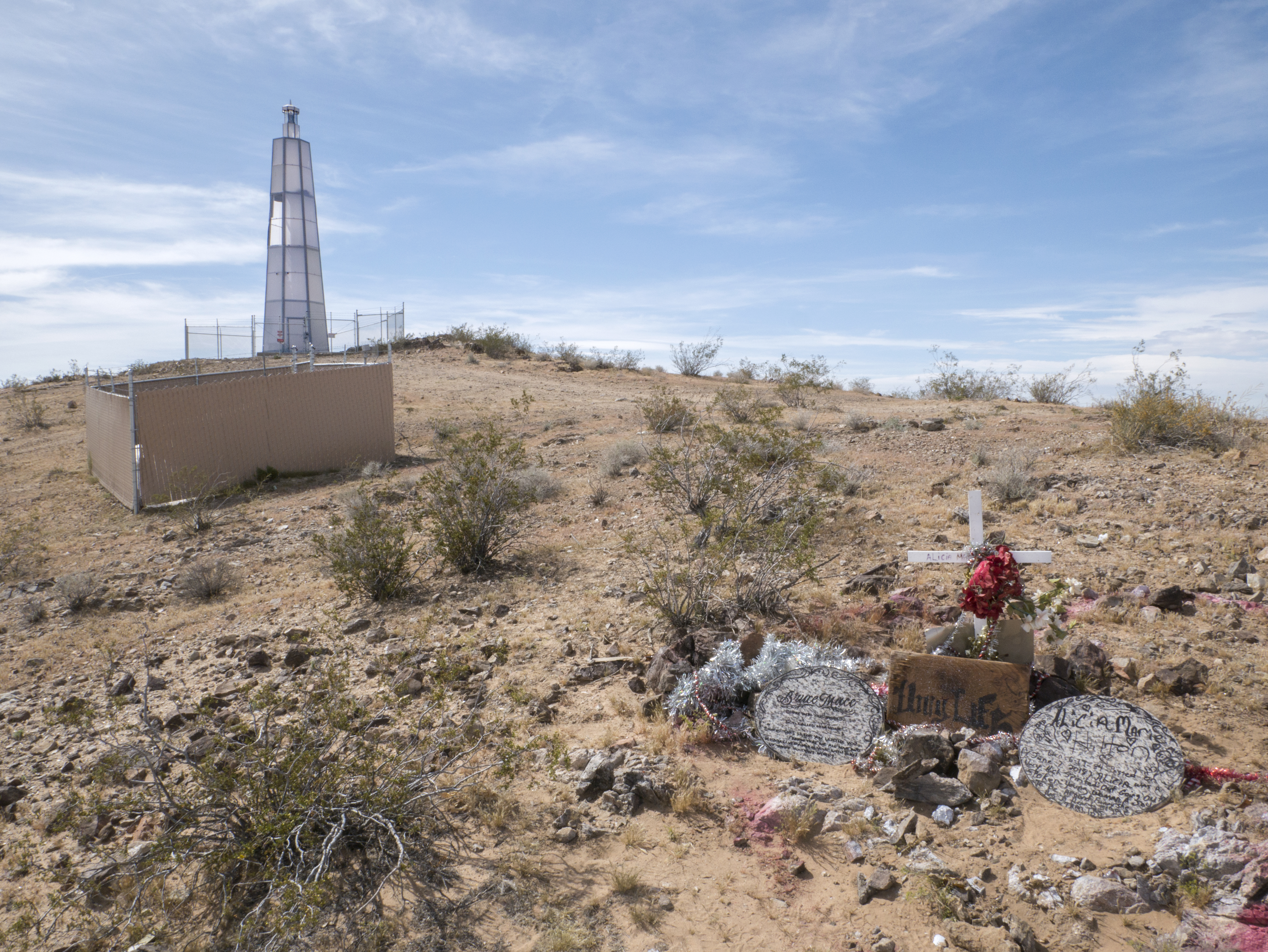
Memorials in the foreground at the Desert Lighthouse. April 2019.

== Current ==
The Desert Lighthouse continues to operate. The lighthouse and its creator, also known as "The Keeper of the Hinkley Light", will be the subject of a documentary to be released in 2023.
