= The Superdeep =

- Movie poster
- Russian: Кольская сверхглубокая
- Directed by: Arseny Syuhin
- Written by: Arseny Syuhin
- Produced by: Alexander Kalushkin; Andrey Shishkanov; Sergey Torchilin
- Starring: Milena Radulović; Maksim Radugin; Nikita Dyuvbanov; Vadim Demchog; Kirill Kovbas
- Music by: Dmitry Selipanov
- Release date: 4 November 2020
- Country: Russia
- Languages: Russian; English
- Budget: ₽150 million (US$2 million)

The Superdeep (Russian: Кольская сверхглубокая, romanized: Kol'skaya sverkhglubokaya, lit. 'Kola Superdeep') is a 2020 Russian horror film directed by Arseny Syuhin, based on the real-life Kola Superdeep Borehole.

The film focuses on a group of researchers and soldiers who investigate the mystery surrounding reports of a disease outbreak at a secret underground research facility in 1984 Russia.

== Plot ==
In 1984, Anna Fedorova, a Soviet epidemiologist, authorized skipping pre-human vaccine tests to meet state deadlines; her research associate, Dr. Zotoff, voluntarily tested it on himself but died as a result. Anna attempts to resign in shame, but her superior, GRU Col. Morozov, persuades her to continue.

On New Year’s Eve, Anna, successful in her research, is celebrating with loved ones when Morozov calls about their clandestine mission to the Kola borehole in Murmansk, which is not only a dig site as the public believes but also hosts a subterranean laboratory in a kilometers-deep layer of permafrost. Sounds of an unknown origin were recorded deep beneath the surface; shortly after, twenty people went missing. They must retrieve samples from a suspected disease outbreak, one concealed by the site's head, Dr. Grigoriev.

When Anna and Morozov, with soldiers led by Maj. Mikheev, land at the ice-covered facility, a man in a lab coat approaches. On-site soldiers shoot him several times to no effect before he kills himself with a grenade. Anna takes samples from the body, but they decay quickly in the cold. While Anna examines the evacuating staff, one warns that they are being lied to and that the lower levels are Hell. Mikheev takes an interest in Anna, and tries to guess her accent.

The team meets Deputy Head of Research Peter Kuznetsov, who has denounced Grigoriev. The latter demands guarantees that any remaining employees sealed in the lower levels be rescued; having sealed all other access and changed the elevator codes, they are forced to go with him. During the descent, Grigoriev depressurizes the elevator cabin to incapacitate the team and escapes into the "Resort" residential module with the key; without it, they cannot reach the bottom-most "Sahara" research module.

Searching Resort, the team find engineer Nikolay and Dr. Kira, both left behind during the evacuation. Anna tests them in Kira's lab and finds no infection. Encountering Grigoriev, he begs them to leave via the shaft, but refuses to give up the key. The soldiers shoot him but he flees to Sahara using the elevator. Because of the shaft's fatal heat, Egorov and his team don heat suits to pursue Grigoriev. Suddenly, Olga, a Sahara lab assistant without protective gear, emerges from the shaft and is taken to the lab while Egorov's men descend.

Olga shows signs of fever but feels cold; mold-like growths not observed when she emerged now cover her back. Grigoriev announces over the intercom that he must seal the facility and detonates the pressure pump, leaving Resort to collapse within an hour. Returning to the lab, Anna and Mikheev find the walls covered with a black mold. A mutated Olga, half-melted to the floor yet somehow alive, releases spores that infect Mikheev. Anna dons a gas mask and narrowly fends off a mutated Kira. Realizing the mold dies at low temperatures, Anna decontaminates herself with a fire extinguisher.

Anna tells Morozov that the permafrost keeps the mold colony from spreading, so it needs warm-bodied hosts. Morozov reveals that he cannot call for rescue; determined to procure a biological weapon for the state, he elects to bring the worsening Mikheev to the surface. Egorov frantically radios that he is under attack, so the three remaining soldiers attempt a rescue against his warnings. Only two return, encountering something "big" and unaffected by gunfire; the third, missing an arm and pursued by an unseen entity, cuts his own throat. Mikheev and the last two men stay behind to delay the attacker while Nikolay rigs the elevator to descend.

The four survivors find Sahara frozen, discovering an entire wall covered in the missing infected scientists melted together, but killed by the cold. Grigoriev has taken the key out into the boiling-hot exterior and sabotaged the heat suits; Morozov volunteers to retrieve it, but does not return. Anna recovers the key from his body, witnessing the heart of the outbreak: a colossal, glowing fungal super-colony. Peter then takes the key at gunpoint and wounds Nikolay, wanting fame for officially discovering the mold. Reaching Resort, they are attacked by a large organism made up of fused bodies that absorbs Peter. Anna chills herself in a freezer to stealthily obtain the key and escape with Nikolay, only to discover a mutated Mikheev melted into the elevator floor. He begs Anna not to let the infection out, but Nikolay, intent on escaping, fights her for the controls. Mikheev partially frees himself and fatally stabs Nikolay to save Anna: she tells him she is Yugoslavian and kisses him. Now infected, she drops the elevator, but is dragged away by a hazmat team before it plummets. Once outside in the cold, Anna steals a grenade to kill herself and the mold. As a soldier sneaks behind her with a sedative, the screen cuts to black as she primes the grenade.

== Cast ==
- Milena Radulović as Anya Fedorova
- Sergey Ivanyuk as Major Sergey Mikheev
- Nikolay Kovbas as Colonel Yury Morozov
- Vadim Demchog as Dr. Dmitry Grigoriev
- Kirill Kovbas as Pyotr Kuznetsov
- Nikita Dyuvbanov as Nikolay
- Viktor Nizovoy as "Bigg^{[sic]} Daddy"
- Artyom Tsukanov as Egorov
- Alexei Sdobnov as Tarabukin
- Dasha Chagall as Olga Krylova
- Albina Chaykina as Kira Vitalievna

Other members of Mikheev's unit include Ilya Ilinykh as an unnamed Sergeant, Vladimir Kolida as a radio operator, and Evgeniy Tscherkashin as a sniper.

== Reception ==
=== Critical response ===
The Superdeep has an approval rating of 29% on review aggregator website Rotten Tomatoes, based on 14 reviews, and an average rating of 4.1/10.
