= Doug Harvey (artist) =

Artist, curator, and writer based in Los Angeles

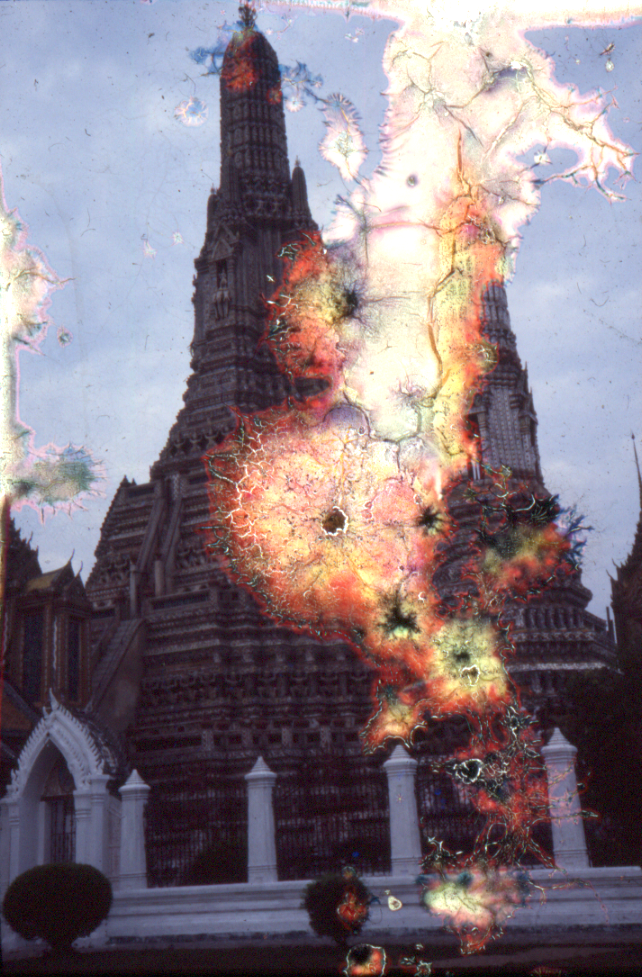
One of Doug Harvey's approximately 1200 found moldy 35mm vacation slides, used for artworks and performances.

Doug Harvey is an American artist, curator, and art critic based in Los Angeles, California

== Life ==
For fifteen years Harvey was a freelance arts writer and lead art critic for LA Weekly and during his tenure there was considered "one of the most important voices on art in the city" by editor Tom Christie, "an art critic who is read all over the country, is smart, snappy, original, has an independent open eye, a quick wit, is not boring and never academic" by New York Magazine critic Jerry Saltz, and "a master of the unexpected chain-reaction of thought" by Pulitzer Prize winning LA Times critic Christopher Knight.

He was fired from his position there late in 2010 in part because of a dispute about the tone of his review of a William Eggleston exhibition at the Los Angeles County Museum of Art, which incoming editor Drex Heikes characterized as "academic." However, this action was concurrent with the systematic downsizing that had been initiated with the paper's acquisition by New Times Media in 2004.

His writing has also appeared in Art in America, The New York Times, The Nation, Modern Painters, ArtReview, and numerous other publications. He has written museum and gallery catalog essays for Jim Shaw, The Institute for Figuring, Jeffrey Vallance, Tim Hawkinson, Marnie Weber, Lari Pittman, Cathy Ward, The Museum of Jurassic Technology, Mike Kelley, Georganne Deen, Gary Panter, Margaret Keane, Thomas Kinkade, The Desert Lighthouse, and many others.

His curatorial projects have ranged from many traditional gallery and museum exhibitions (including the short-lived Annual LA Weekly Biennials at Track 16 Gallery, 2008's Aspects of Mel's Hole: Artists Respond to a Paranormal Land Event Occurring in Radiospace at Santa Ana's Grand Central Art Center, and career surveys of Don Suggs, Michael Arata, and surf art/psychedelic poster and comix legend Rick Griffin) to CD compilations of sound art, programs of found and experimental films, performance events, experimental radio, artists' comic books and zines, and an LA solo gallery exhibit determined by raffle. In July 2011 his global project (with Christian Cummings) Chain Letter 2011 included work by more than 1600 artists in its iteration at Shoshana Wayne Gallery in Santa Monica alone, shutting down the 10 Freeway exit to Bergamot Station during installation.

Harvey's artwork ranges across painting, collage, found objects, film and video, performance, installation, publications, and sound. He has an ongoing series related to a set of found moldy 35mm slides and has exhibited them throughout Los Angeles at art spaces including The Hammer Museum, The Museum of Jurassic Technology, Jancar Gallery, Los Angeles Valley College Art Gallery, another year in LA, and the California Museum of Photography. He received his MFA in Painting from UCLA in 1994 and has exhibited extensively, including over a dozen solo shows at LA galleries including POST, High Energy Constructs, and Jancar Gallery.

Reviewing his solo debut at POST Gallery, St. Sebastian Tom Sawyer Cathy Mishima Expo 67, LA Times critic David Pagel wrote, "Harvey's art makes the most outlandish conspiracy theorist look like a stodgy logician." Art in America critic Constance Mallinson said of his October 2010 solo painting show Unsustainable at Jancar Gallery "Harvey's work reeks of rot and decay." On the occasion of Untidy, Harvey's mid-career survey at LA Valley College, LA Times' Christopher Knight commented, "the raging torrent of modern media-culture is his medium, and the paintings, collages, drawings and sculpture seem to regard it as a revealing cesspool of bleak but salvageable fun."

Since the mid-1980s, Harvey has worked closely with the improvisational audio collage collective Mannlicher Carcano, facilitating their numerous self-released recordings, video documentation, participation in gallery and museum exhibitions, and, since 1997, the Los Angeles portion of their weekly tele-linked international radio broadcast The Mannlicher Carcano Radio Hour. Other musical affiliations include Tenacious Mucoid Exudate, Fireworks (Flugeldar), The Charles Ray Experience, F (Fauxmish), The New Suicide Revolutionary Jazz Bad, and The Friendliness Happening.

Harvey has taught at UCLA's graduate school and California Institute of the Arts, where he initiated classes in Outsider Theory and 'patacritical Interrogation Techniques. In 2013 AC Books published Harvey's 'patacritical Interrogation Techniques Anthology Volume 3, a collection of 'patacritical writings and research with contributions from Peter Blegvad, Craig Baldwin, Clayton Eshleman, Christine Wertheim, Richard Shaver, steve roden, Edward Lear, Jerome Rothenberg, and others. Harvey currently teaches Studio Art and Art History at West Los Angeles College.
