= Suggestivism =

Suggestivism is an offshoot of the Lowbrow art movement that invites the viewer to develop their own interpretation of the work, i.e. 'suggestive'.

Nathan Spoor entitled a 2011 gallery exhibition "Suggestivism" at CSU Fullerton's Grand Central Art Center in Santa Ana, California. This exhibition's art was published in a book of the same title, along with background information on the artists, including interviews by Spoor. Suggestivism's roots may be traced to 19th century artists James McNeill Whistler, Georges Seurat and Arthur B. Davies.

== Conceptual art ==
At a conceptual level, suggestivism is "the ability of an individual to pursue their purpose with an amplified understanding and sensitivity." It uses the word 'suggest' as its root to imply, "through the mere power of suggestion, the magic is transferred from one to another, engaging the world at large from the most vivid and evocative of visual realms."

== Suggestivist artists ==
Several artists have had their work described as part of suggestivism, including those exhibited at the CSUF Grand Central Art Center in 2011.
