= CSUF Grand Central Art Center =

California State University external campus building

Grand Central Art Center
- Established: 1999
- Location: 125 N. Broadway, Santa Ana, CA 92701-8237
- Coordinates: 33.745950°N 117.869158°W
- Director: John D. Spiak (Director/Chief Curator)
- Website: www.grandcentralartcenter.com

California State University, Fullerton Grand Central Art Center is a partnership between the university and the city of Santa Ana. and is based in the Downtown National Register District or Artists Village.

== History ==
The city of Santa Ana spent $7.5 million to purchase and refurbish what was the Grand Central Building, originally built in 1924. The project has won three architectural awards.

The center's fiscal plan allows it to self-generate income to support basic day-to-day operations. The restaurant, classrooms and other designated areas are subleased to third-party operators. The apartments and studios are sub-leased to CSU Fullerton graduate students.

=== Directors ===
- Andrea Lee Harris (1998 - 2008)
- Dennis Cubbage (2008 - 2010)
- Mike McGee (2011; interim)
- John D. Spiak (September 2011 – Present)

== Facilities ==
Twenty-seven apartments are available for students who have been accepted into the university MA or MFA visual and performing arts programs. One of the residential apartments is reserved for the art center’s artist-in-residence program. In addition, an 800-square-foot (74 m^{2}) private studio space is designated for the artist-in-residence.

The Grand Central Gallery and Project Room feature exhibitions and projects by internationally noted artists. Four to six exhibitions a year are presented in each space.

The theater is centrally located in the center. It is configured in-the-round and seats an audience of eighty-five. The theater is programmed by theater company The Wayward Artist.
