= Bring Me Down =

Bring Me Down may refer to:

- "Bring Me Down" (Miranda Lambert song), 2005
- "Bring Me Down (You Don't)", a song by Love Amongst Ruin, 2011
- "Bring Me Down", a song by EMF from Cha Cha Cha, 1995
- "Bring Me Down", a song by Kanye West from Late Registration, 2005
- "Bring Me Down", a song by Lenka from Lenka, 2008
- "Bring Me Down", a song by Mehrzad Marashi, 2010
- "Bring Me Down", a song by Monoxide from Chainsmoker LP, 2004
- "Bring Me Down", a song by Nikki Kerkhof, 2008
- "Bring Me Down", a song by Nonpoint from Vengeance, 2007
- "Bring Me Down", a song by the Open, 2004
- "Bring Me Down", a song by Pete Mac from In Limbo, 2009
- "Bring Me Down", a song by Pillar from Where Do We Go from Here, 2004
- "Bring Me Down", a song by Prime Circle from Live This Life, 2005
- "Bring Me Down", a song by Puddle of Mudd from Come Clean, 2001
- "Bring Me Down", a song by Rivermaya from Rivermaya, 1994
- "Bring Me Down", a song by Roses Are Red from What Became of Me, 2006
- "Bring Me Down", a song by Shyne Factory, 2000
- "Bring Me Down", a song by Useless ID, included on the compilation album Punk Rock Is Your Friend: Kung Fu Records Sampler No. 4, 2003
- "Bring Me Down (Part 2)", a song by Saigon from The Greatest Story Never Told, 2011
- "Bring Me Down (Swollen Mix)", a song by Swollen Members from Dagger Mouth, 2011
- "Check-moé ben aller (Bring Me Down)", a song by GrimSkunk from EP 2000, 2000
- "Faith Healer (Bring Me Down)", a song by Maylene and the Sons of Disaster from IV, 2011
