= Freaks on Parade Tour =

2026 concert tour by Rob Zombie and Marilyn Manson

- Tour by Rob Zombie and Marilyn Manson
- Official tour image
- Associated albums: The Great Satan, One Assassination Under God – Chapter 1 and One Assassination Under God – Chapter 2
- Start date: August 20, 2026
- End date: September 20, 2026
- Legs: 1
- No. of shows: 21
- Supporting acts: The Hu; Orgy

Rob Zombie and Marilyn Manson concert chronology
- Twins of Evil: Hell Never Dies Tour
  (2019)
- Freaks on Parade Tour
  (2026)
Marilyn Manson tour chronology
One Assassination Under God Tour (2024–26)	Freaks on Parade Tour (2026)

The Freaks on Parade Tour is the fourth double bill concert tour by American rock bands Rob Zombie and Marilyn Manson. The tour will consist of 21 shows and will visit amphitheatres across North America from August 20 to September 20, 2026. Mongolian folk metal band The Hu and American industrial rock band Orgy will provide support for the tour. It is Rob Zombie and Marilyn Manson's fourth co-headlining tour, following the Twins of Evil Tour in 2012, the Twins of Evil: The Second Coming Tour in 2018, and the Twins of Evil: Hell Never Dies Tour in 2019.

== Background and itinerary ==
The tour shares its name with a co-headlining tour Rob Zombie embarked upon with Mudvayne in 2022, then Alice Cooper in 2023 and 2024. Zombie and Marilyn Manson had previously done three co-headlining tours together: the Twins of Evil Tour in 2012, the Twins of Evil: The Second Coming Tour in 2018, and the Twins of Evil: Hell Never Dies Tour in 2019. The 2026 Freaks on Parade Tour consists of 21 dates at arenas and amphitheatres, beginning on August 20 at the iTHINK Financial Amphitheatre in Florida and ending at Toyota Pavilion at Concord in California on September 20. One date takes place at the RBC Amphitheatre in Toronto, Canada, while the rest take place in the United States.

Zombie will be touring in support of his eighth solo studio album The Great Satan, which was released in February 2026. Manson will be touring in support of 2024's One Assassination Under God – Chapter 1, as well as their new album One Assassination Under God – Chapter 2 released on August 14, 2026.

== Line-ups and backing bands ==
In addition to their previous co-headlining tours, Rob Zombie and Marilyn Manson share an extensive band history. Rob Zombie's band for this tour will feature Mike Riggs, the guitarist who contributed to Zombie's first two solo albums, 1998's Hellbilly Deluxe and 2001's The Sinister Urge. Riggs re-joined the band in 2023, soon after his successor – former Marilyn Manson guitarist, John 5 – left to join Mötley Crüe. Zombie's band will also include original bassist Rob "Blasko" Nicholson, who re-joined following the departure of his replacement Piggy D., who left to join Manson's band in 2024. Former Manson drummer Ginger Fish has been a member of Zombie's band since 2011.

Marilyn Manson's live band in 2024 and 2025 consisted of guitarists Tyler Bates and Reba Meyers, bassist Piggy D., and drummer Gil Sharone. However, Bates announced in January 2026 that he had amicably parted ways with the live band in order to focus on his film score work, but said he would be "actively supporting" their upcoming album One Assassination Under God – Chapter 2, which he referred to as his and Manson's "finest work together". The following month, former bassist Tim Sköld confirmed his return to Manson's band. Piggy D. and former Black Light Burns guitarist Nick Annis are Marilyn Manson's current live guitarists, following Meyers's departure to focus on solo work.

The Hu and Orgy will provide support for every date of the tour, with the exception of the September 16 date at Airway Heights, Washington, where Orgy will be the sole opening act. Mongolian folk metal band The Hu's music combines heavy metal with traditional Mongolian instruments such as the morin khuur, while their vocalists use techniques such as throat singing and war cries. Orgy are a Los Angeles-based industrial rock band that have released several platinum records.

== Commercial performance ==
Ticket sales began on January 20 via a presale with CitiBank, with artist presales occurring between then and when tickets went on sale to the general public on January 23.

== Tour dates ==
List of 2026 concerts, showing date, city, country, venue and opening acts
Date	City	Country	Venue	Opening acts
August 20, 2026	West Palm Beach	United States	iTHINK Financial Amphitheatre	The Hu; Orgy
August 21, 2026	Tampa	United States	MidFlorida Credit Union Amphitheatre	The Hu; Orgy
August 23, 2026	Alpharetta	United States	Ameris Bank Amphitheatre	The Hu; Orgy
August 24, 2026	Charlotte	United States	Truliant Amphitheater	The Hu; Orgy
August 26, 2026	Holmdel	United States	PNC Bank Arts Center	The Hu; Orgy
August 27, 2026	Mansfield	United States	Xfinity Center	The Hu; Orgy
August 29, 2026	Burgettstown	United States	The Pavilion at Star Lake	The Hu; Orgy
August 30, 2026	Darien Center	United States	Darien Lake Amphitheatre	The Hu; Orgy
September 1, 2026	Toronto	Canada	RBC Amphitheatre	The Hu; Orgy
September 2, 2026	Cuyahoga Falls	United States	Blossom Music Center	The Hu; Orgy
September 4, 2026	Clarkston	United States	Pine Knob Music Theatre	The Hu; Orgy
September 5, 2026	Tinley Park	United States	Credit Union 1 Amphitheatre	The Hu; Orgy
September 6, 2026	Noblesville	United States	Ruoff Music Center	The Hu; Orgy
September 9, 2026	Maryland Heights	United States	Hollywood Casino Amphitheatre	The Hu; Orgy
September 10, 2026	Kansas City	United States	Morton Amphitheater	The Hu; Orgy
September 12, 2026	Greenwood Village	United States	Fiddler's Green Amphitheatre	The Hu; Orgy
September 14, 2026	West Valley City	United States	Utah First Credit Union Amphitheatre	The Hu; Orgy
September 16, 2026	Airway Heights	United States	BECU Live at Northern Quest	Orgy
September 17, 2026	Auburn	United States	White River Amphitheatre	The Hu; Orgy
September 18, 2026	Ridgefield	United States	Cascades Amphitheater	The Hu; Orgy
September 20, 2026	Concord	United States	Toyota Pavilion	The Hu; Orgy
