= GrimSkunk =

Canadian rock band

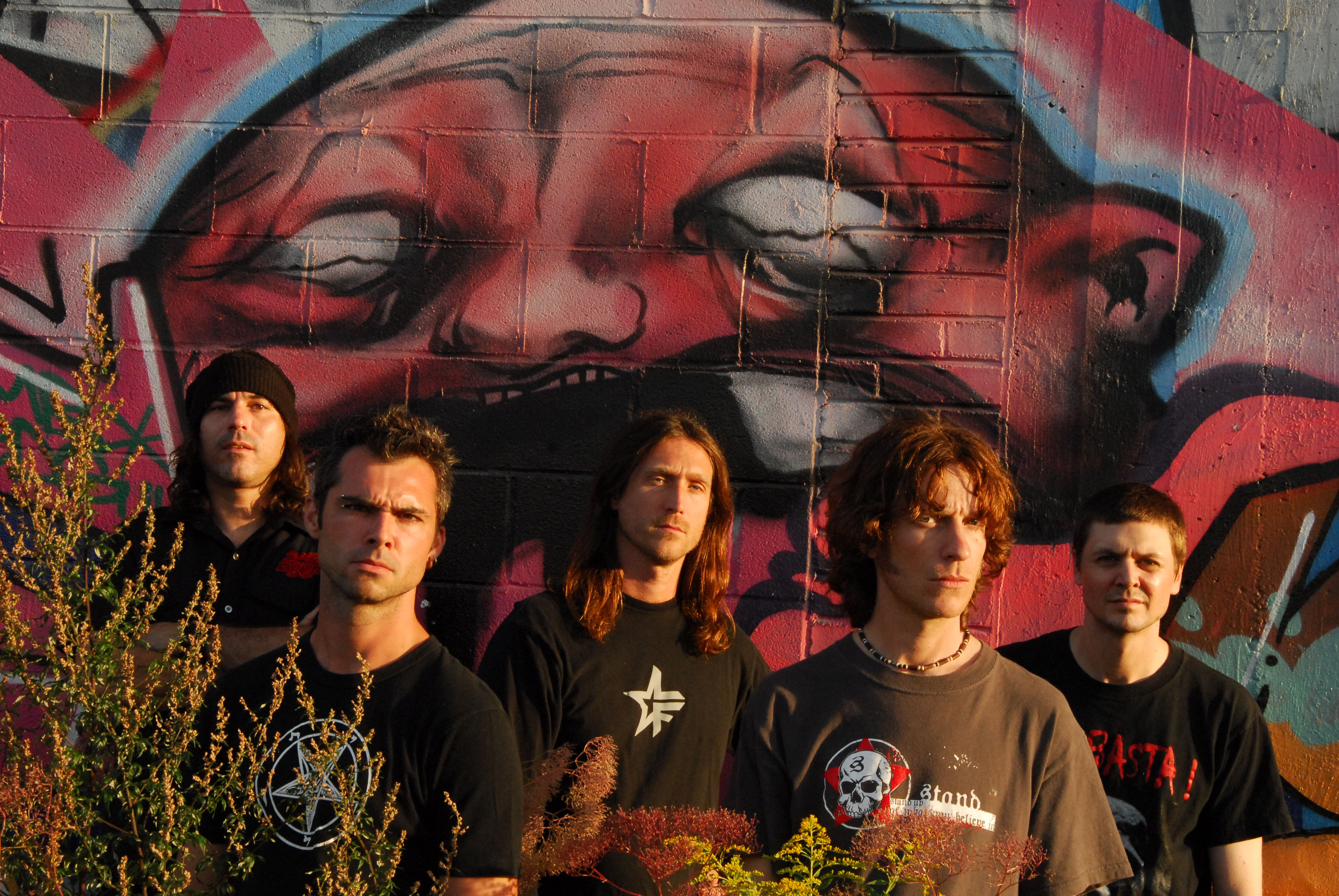
- GrimSkunk (2009)

Background information
- Origin: Montreal, Quebec, Canada
- Years active: 1988–present
- Label: Indica • Cargo Records
- Members: Franz Schuller; Joe Evil; Ben Shatskoff; Alain Vadboncoeur; Vincent Peake; Peter Edwards
- Past members: Marc-Boris St-Maurice (1988–1999); Tod Wirschem(1999–2004); Ben Shatskoff (2009–2021)
- Website: www.grimskunk.com

GrimSkunk is a rock band from Montreal, Quebec, Canada, influenced by punk, rock, progressive and world music. Their style is self-described as "world punk". They are regarded as being part of the foundation of the Quebec alternative scene, having influenced many young musicians and bands.

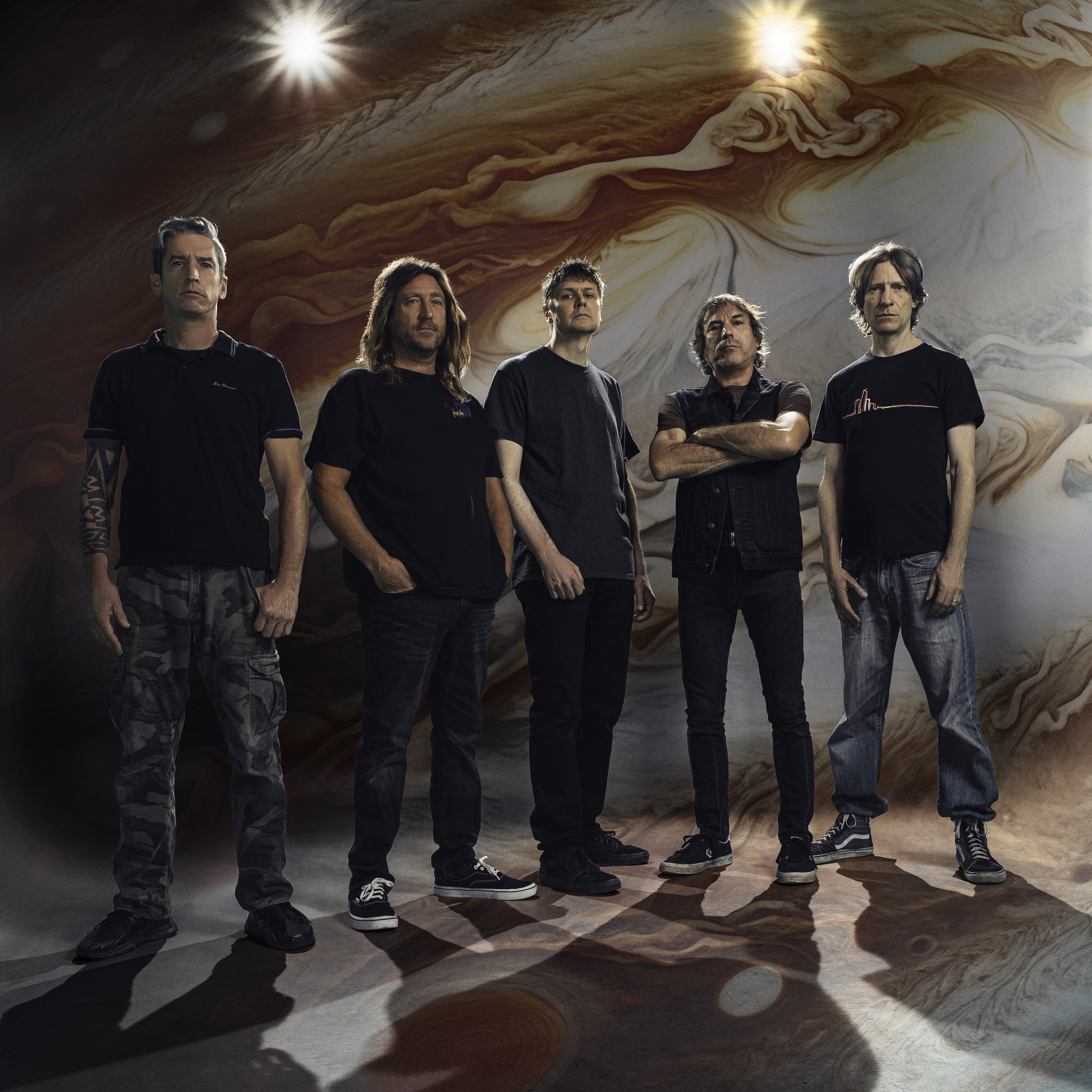
GrimSkunk press photo 2023 by Carl Thériault

The band integrates many languages into its songs, such as French, English, Spanish, Greek, and Persian. It has also integrated many styles of music, including punk rock, hardcore, reggae, progressive and psychedelic rock, ska, rap, and world music.

Over the years, the band shared the stage with many prominent acts such as System Of A Down, Meshuggah, Manu Chao, and Suicidal Tendencies, as well as peers Anonymus, Vulgaires Machins, Deadly Apples, and The Sainte Catherines. They have toured extensively, including concerts on four continents.

== History ==
GrimSkunk was formed in November 1988 from a previous hardcore group known as Fatal Illness. GrimSkunk played its first show in May 1989 in St. Hyacinthe. The band's first demo album, Autumn Flowers, was released two years later, in April 1991. Along with Groovy Aardvark, the band was among the first "alternative" bands to tour Quebec, thus creating a market for this genre.

In the first years of GrimSkunk's career, cannabis was always very present in the band's image. Hemp leaves were on their CD covers, and references to cannabis could be found in the albums' names (Autumn Flowers, Exotic Blend), in their songs' titles (Zig-Zag), and in their lyrics ("Pourquoi, pourquoi ne pas fumer? / C'est ben légal de boire", Why, why can't we smoke / Isn't it legal to drink?). The band's name itself is an allusion to skunk cannabis.

The band's second album, Meltdown, was released in 1996.

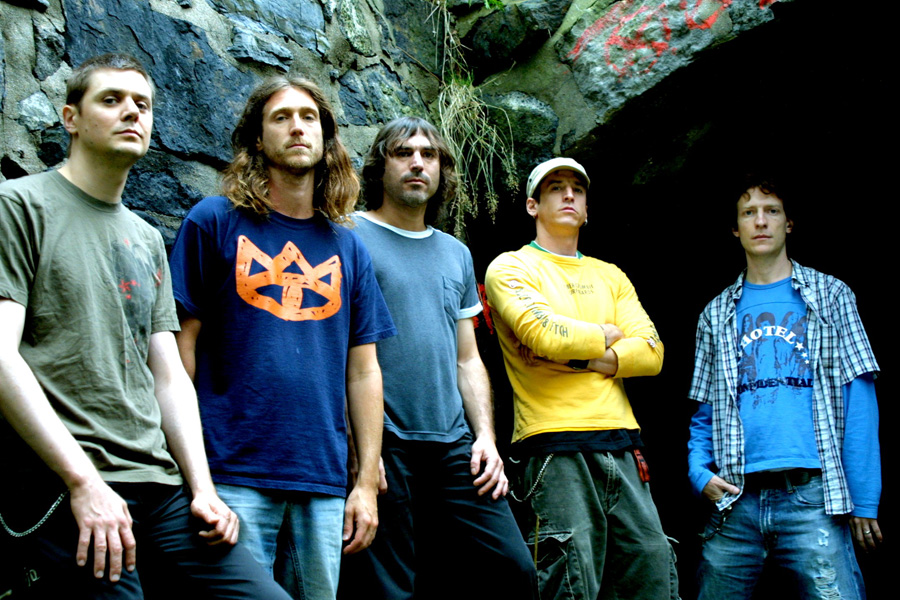
GrimSkunk in 2006

In 1997, the band's longtime manager and friend, Simon Gallipeault, was killed in a "hit-and-run" longboard accident involving a car. The band became self-managed with Franz Schuller as the main "mouthpiece". The 1998 album, Field Trip, is dedicated to Gallipeault and his voice is sampled before the track "Live For Today".

The bass guitarist, Marc-Boris St-Maurice, left in 1999 to become an activist in the marijuana legalization movement, founding the Bloc Pot and the Marijuana Party of Canada. Tod Wirschem replaced Saint-Maurice for a few years. He has since been replaced by Vince Peake, the former Groovy Aardvark singer and bass guitarist.

The band took a break in 2000 after the keyboardist, Joe Evil, suffered serious burns from a fire in his apartment.

In 2002, the band released its seventh album, Seventh Wave, which was not well received by certain critics and fans who did not like the musical change in direction.

In 2002, GrimSkunk performed its first and only unplugged show in Saint-Roch Church in Quebec City.

In 2006, the band released Fires Under the Road, which marked a return to the sound of the earlier albums. They recorded Set Fire! in 2012 in Sydney, Australia. The album was produced by Gus Van Go and Werner F. In 2018, they released their ninth album, Unreason in the Age of Madness, which includes songs about the National Rifle Association of America, Donald Trump, and the impact of technology.

== Indica Records ==
In 1997, GrimSkunk members founded an independent Montreal-based record label Indica Records following the bankruptcy of the band's former label Cargo Records. From then on, all of the band's albums were released on that label, which also helped to promote local alternative bands.

The label initially supported only GrimSkunk's music but later expanded to support and release music for other bands including punk, rock, metal, alternative, world music, indie and pop rock, electronic, and hip-hop from Quebec and elsewhere. There is an office in Australia named Indica Australia. Artists have included Les Trois Accords, Priestess, The Franklin Electric, Vulgaires Machins, Hey Major, La Voix runner up Colin Moore, Caracol, Half Moon Run, Misteur Valaire, Australian acts The Cat Empire, John Butler, Kim Churchill, and French acts such Anaïs and La Ruda Salska.

== Members ==
- Franz Schuller - rhythm guitar, vocals
- Joe Evil - keyboard, vocals
- Alain Vadeboncoeur - drums (1988–2009; 2021–present)
- Vincent Peake - bass guitar
- Peter Edwards - lead guitar
- Marc-Boris St-Maurice - bass guitar (1988–1999)
- Tod Wirschem - bass guitar (1999–2004)
- Ben Shatskoff - drums (2009–2021)

== Discography ==
- Autumn Flowers Demo (GrimSkunk Productions) 1991
- Exotic Blend (GrimSkunk Productions) EP, 1992
- Rooftop Killer 7" (GrimSkunk Productions, L'Oblique, en Guard Records) 1993
- Grim Skunk (Indica Records) 1994
- Meltdown (Indica Records) 1995
- Autumn Flowers – Rerolled (Indica Records) 1997
- Fieldtrip (Indica Records) 1998
- EP 2000 (Indica Records) 2001
- GrimSkunk Plays... Fatal Illness (Indica Records), 2001
- Seventh Wave (Indica Records), 2002)
- Live + DVD unplugged (Indica Records), 2003
- Fires Under the Road (Indica Records), 2006
- Skunkadelic (Indica Records), compilation, 2011
- Set Fire! (Indica Records), 2012
- Unreason in the Age of Madness (Indica Records), 2018
