= Grim Skunk (album) =

Studio album by GrimSkunk
- Released: 1994
- Genre: Hard rock, progressive rock, punk rock
- Length: 57:52
- Label: Indica Records (Canada)
- Producer: Glen Robinson

GrimSkunk chronology
Grim Skunk (1994)	Meltdown (1995)

Grim Skunk is the debut album by Canadian rock group GrimSkunk released in 1994. Uncle Costa is featured on Martha and a video was made for Silverhead. The songs Don't Hide and Rooftop Killer are rerecorded and rearranged versions from the Fatal Illness days.

== Track listing ==
1. Silverhead
2. In Eight Years
3. Don't Hide
4. Mother Of Creation
5. Martha
6. Bach In The Moors Of Mars
7. Look at Yourself
8. Watchful Elms
9. Autumn Flowers
10. Circle Square Triangle
11. Texas Cult Song
12. Le dernier jour
13. Rooftop Killer
