= GrimSkunk Plays... Fatal Illness =

Studio album by GrimSkunk
- Released: 2001
- Genre: Punk rock
- Length: 40:41
- Label: Indica Records (Canada)
- Producer: Pierre Rémillard; GrimSkunk

GrimSkunk chronology
Fieldtrip (1998)	GrimSkunk Plays... Fatal Illness (2001)	Seventh Wave (2002)

GrimSkunk Plays... Fatal Illness is a compilation album of rerecorded songs by the Canadian rock group, GrimSkunk, from their early days when known as Fatal Illness. It was released in 2001.

== Track listing ==
1. You're Just Like Oscar
2. Rick Loves His Window
3. Poser Punk
4. Don't Hide
5. A-Type
6. No More Life
7. Lord Ogre
8. Race's Flaw
9. Final Tale
10. Dead Mutant
11. Go
12. Faces On You
13. Insane
14. NPC
15. Human Blender
16. Fat Al's Illness
17. Power Word Kill
18. Rooftop Killer
