= Exotic Blend =

EP by GrimSkunk
- Released: 1992 (Canada, North America)
- Genre: Punk rock
- Length: 23:35
- Label: Indica Records (Canada)
- Producer: Simon Gallipeault

Exotic Blend is the first EP by the Canadian rock group GrimSkunk released in 1992. It features Uncle Costa from Blood Sausage on Perestroïska.

== Track listing ==
1. Loaded Gun
2. Perestroïska
3. Gormenghast
4. Bugs in Billy Bob's Bed
5. It's in My Head
6. Nursery Rhyme
