= Twins of Evil: The Second Coming Tour =

2018 concert tour by Rob Zombie and Marilyn Manson

- Tour by Rob Zombie and Marilyn Manson
- Promotional poster for the Twins of Evil: The Second Coming Tour
- Location: North America
- Start date: July 11, 2018
- End date: December 29, 2018
- Legs: 1
- No. of shows: 33 (+ 2 canceled)

Rob Zombie and Marilyn Manson concert chronology
- Twins of Evil Tour
  (2012)
- Twins of Evil: The Second Coming Tour
  (2018)
- Twins of Evil: Hell Never Dies Tour
  (2019)
Marilyn Manson tour chronology
- Heaven Upside Down Tour
- (2017–18)
- Twins of Evil: The Second Coming Tour
- (2018)
- Twins of Evil: Hell Never Dies Tour
- (2019)

Twins of Evil: The Second Coming Tour was the second double bill concert tour co-headlined by American rock bands Rob Zombie and Marilyn Manson with special guest Deadly Apples, launched in support of Manson's tenth studio album Heaven Upside Down (2017) and Zombie's sixth solo album The Electric Warlock Acid Witch Satanic Orgy Celebration Dispenser (2016), as well as a vinyl box set released by Zombie on March 30, 2018. The tour was a sequel to the 2012 "Twins of Evil Tour", and visited a mix of amphitheaters and arenas from July 11 to August 29 and December 29.

In 2019, the tour was succeeded by the Twins of Evil: Hell Never Dies Tour in the critically acclaimed and commercially successful Twins of Evil franchise.

== Background ==
Following the altercation between the bands' respective lead vocalists during the "Twins of Evil Tour" in 2012 that "almost came to blows," Zombie appeared on Howard Stern's show in 2014 and suggested he was "probably" willing to co-headline a tour with him again; finding the conflict petty. In the six years since the tour ended, the two frontmen privately made amends and decided to embark on another joint tour. Titled Twins of Evil: The Second Coming Tour, ticket presale began on March 19, 2018, followed by general sales on the 24th of the same month. Canadian band Deadly Apples was announced as the opening act in May.

Initially, only 27 dates were announced. However, this eventually grew to 35. The tour's maiden show was on July 11, 2018, at the DTE Energy Music Center in Detroit. Zombie took a week-long break in early August to complete production on 3 From Hell while Manson headlined clubs with support from Deadly Apples.

== "Helter Skelter" ==
In advance of the tour, Rob Zombie and Marilyn Manson met in Los Angeles and discussed the possibility of collaborating on a newly recorded song. The pair eventually decided to cover The Beatles' "Helter Skelter", which was released as a one-track digital single on the day the tour commenced—July 11. The recording features instrumental contributions from two former members of Marilyn Manson: guitarist John 5 and drummer Ginger Fish, who both joined Zombie's band soon after departing Manson's. This is Manson's first collaboration with either of these former members since The Golden Age of Grotesque (2003) and The High End of Low (2009), respectively. Zombie said of the cover: "I think it's cool because we dirtied it up, slowed it down and made it even heavier and groovier, but still true to the song". The track peaked at number nine on Billboard's Hard Rock Digital Songs, and was performed by both artists together on the first night of the tour.

== Critical reception ==
Billboard praised the tour saying that it made "a big rock show feel like not only the right place to be, but also the best."

== Set lists ==
These set lists are representative of the tour's opening performance on July 11 at the DTE Energy Music Center in Detroit. They are not representative of the set list of all concerts throughout the tour.

- Marilyn Manson:
1. "Irresponsible Hate Anthem"
2. "Angel with the Scabbed Wings"
3. "Deep Six"
4. "This Is the New Shit"
5. "Disposable Teens"
6. "mOBSCENE"
7. "Kill4Me"
8. "I Don't Like the Drugs (But the Drugs Like Me)" / "The Dope Show"
9. "Sweet Dreams (Are Made of This)"
10. "Say10"
11. "Antichrist Superstar"
12. "The Beautiful People"
13. "Cry Little Sister"
- Rob Zombie:
1. "Meet the Creeper"
2. "Superbeast"
3. "Well, Everybody's Fucking in a U.F.O."
4. "Living Dead Girl"
5. "In the Age of the Consecrated Vampire We All Get High"
6. "Dead City Radio and the New Gods of Supertown"
7. "More Human than Human"
8. "The Hideous Exhibitions of a Dedicated Gore Whore"
9. "Pussy Liquor"
10. "Thunder Kiss '65"
11. "Helter Skelter" (with Marilyn Manson)
12. "Dragula"

== Tour dates ==
List of concerts, showing date, city, country, and venue
Date	City	Country	Venue	Opening Act(s)
North America
July 11, 2018	Clarkston	United States	DTE Energy Music Center	Deadly Apples
July 14, 2018	Maryland Heights	United States	Hollywood Casino Amphitheatre	Deadly Apples
July 15, 2018	Tinley Park	United States	Hollywood Casino Amphitheatre	Deadly Apples
July 17, 2018	Cuyahoga Falls	United States	Blossom Music Center	Deadly Apples
July 18, 2018	Noblesville	United States	Ruoff Home Mortgage Music Center	Deadly Apples
July 20, 2018	Virginia Beach	United States	Veterans United Home Loans Amphitheater	Deadly Apples
July 22, 2018	Syracuse	United States	K-Rockathon	Deadly Apples
July 24, 2018	Holmdel	United States	PNC Bank Arts Center	Deadly Apples
July 25, 2018	Burgettstown	United States	KeyBank Pavilion	Deadly Apples
July 26, 2018 (Note: Marilyn Manson did not perform on this date, as the vocalist had been diagnosed with influenza. However, the concert still went ahead, with Rob Zombie performing an extended set.)	Toronto	Canada	Budweiser Stage	Deadly Apples
July 28, 2018	Montreal	Canada	Heavy Montréal	Deadly Apples
July 29, 2018	Bangor	United States	Impact Festival	Deadly Apples
July 31, 2018 (Note: Originally scheduled for July 21. Postponed due to severe weather.)	Bristow	United States	Jiffy Lube Live	Deadly Apples
August 8, 2018	Mansfield	United States	Xfinity Center	Deadly Apples
August 9, 2018	Camden	United States	BB&T Pavilion	Deadly Apples
August 11, 2018	Hartford	United States	Xfinity Theatre	Deadly Apples
August 12, 2018	Darien Lake	United States	Darien Lake Performing Arts Center	Deadly Apples
August 14, 2018	Atlanta	United States	Cellairis Amphitheatre	Deadly Apples
August 16, 2018	Dallas	United States	Starplex Pavilion	Deadly Apples
August 17, 2018	Austin	United States	Austin360 Amphitheater	Deadly Apples
August 18, 2018	The Woodlands	United States	Cynthia Woods Mitchell Pavilion	Deadly Apples
August 20, 2018	Denver	United States	Pepsi Center	Deadly Apples
August 22, 2018	West Valley City	United States	USANA Amphitheatre	Deadly Apples
August 24, 2018	Chula Vista	United States	Mattress Firm Amphitheatre	Deadly Apples
August 25, 2018	Las Vegas	United States	MGM Grand Garden Arena	Deadly Apples
August 26, 2018	Phoenix	United States	Ak-Chin Pavilion	Deadly Apples
August 28, 2018	Concord	United States	Concord Pavilion	Deadly Apples
August 29, 2018	Irvine	United States	FivePoint Amphitheatre	Deadly Apples
December 29, 2018	Reno	United States	Grand Sierra Theatre	Deadly Apples
December 31, 2018	Inglewood	United States	The Forum	Deadly Apples

=== Cancelled or rescheduled shows ===
List of cancelled concerts, showing date, city, country, venue and reason for cancellation
Date	City	Country	Venue	Reason
July 13, 2018	Oshkosh	United States	Rock USA Festival	Thunderstorms
August 7, 2018	Wantagh	United States	Jones Beach Theater	Flooded venue

== Line-up ==
Line-up
Role	Artist
Co-headlining	Rob Zombie
Co-headlining	Marilyn Manson
Opening act	Deadly Apples
