= Autumn Flowers – Rerolled =

Autumn Flowers, Rerolled

Studio album by GrimSkunk
- Released: 1997
- Genre: Rock; punk rock
- Length: 68:25
- Label: Indica Records (Canada)
- Producer: M.A. Thibert; Thierry Lacombe

GrimSkunk chronology
Meltdown (1996)	Autumn Flowers, Rerolled (1997)	Fieldtrip (1998)

Autumn Flowers, Rerolled is an album by Canadian rock group GrimSkunk released in 1997. It contains re-recorded versions of songs from the 1991 demo tape Autumn Flowers. Ben Fortier provides lead vocals on Pourquoi pourquoi ne pas fumer and backing vocals on Zig Zag and Rhinoceros. Backing vocals on Mange d'la marde are featured by Vincent Peake, from former group Groovy Aardvark, Shantal Arroyo, from Overbass and Uncle Costa from Blood Sausage. The twelfth track is the original demo tape Autumn Flowers (1991), which is very rare to no more available.

== Track listing ==
1. Pourquoi pourquoi ne pas fumer
2. Zig Zag
3. Rhinoceros
4. Spiderman
5. Vikings
6. Footsteps In Loyola
7. La légende d'Overhead
8. Gormenghast
9. Camptown Lady
10. Sensi
11. Mange d'la marde (live at Le Medley, October 4, 1996)
12. Autumn Flowers(original demo)
