= Fieldtrip (album) =

Studio album by GrimSkunk
- Released: 1998
- Genre: Hard rock; progressive rock; punk rock
- Length: 44:27
- Label: Indica Records (Canada)
- Producer: André Gielen

GrimSkunk chronology
Autumn Flowers – Rerolled (1997)	Fieldtrip (1998)	GrimSkunk Plays... Fatal Illness (2001)

Fieldtrip is the third album by Canadian rock group GrimSkunk released in 1998. It is the last album to feature Marc "Boris" St-Maurice on bass. Shantal Arroyo appears on "¡Ya Basta!" and "La pistolera". Uncle Costa appears on "Ska-se (Shut The Fuck Up)". I Ronee from Race appears on "Looking For Gabbio". Videos were made for the songs "Looking For Gabbio" and "Gros tas d'marde".

== Track listing ==
1. "Mahmoud's Dream"
2. "Gotta Find A Way"
3. "Live For Today"
4. "Looking For Gabbio"
5. "Gros tas d'marde"
6. "Meltdown"
7. "¡Ya Basta!"
8. "Fox Hunt"
9. "La pistolera"
10. "Dimming The Light"
11. "Lâchez vos drapeaux"
12. "Oh My God"
13. "Ska-Se (Shut The Fuck Up)"
