= Fires Under the Road =

2006 studio album by GrimSkunk

Fires Under The Road

Studio album by GrimSkunk
- Released: October 31, 2006 (Canada, North America)
- Recorded: August 2006
- Genre: Hard rock
- Length: 53:37
- Label: Indica Records (Canada)
- Producer: Garth Richardson

GrimSkunk chronology
Seventh Wave (2001)	Fires Under The Road (2006)

Fires Under The Road is an album and a song from the Quebec hard rock group GrimSkunk released in 2006. The album marks the return of the classic GrimSkunk sound and is the first with new bass player Vince Peake, from the defunct band Groovy Aardvark.

== Song List ==
1. Psychedelic Wonderdrug
2. America Sucks
3. Wakin' & Bakin'
4. Fires Under The Road
5. You Could Be Beautiful
6. VQL (Vive le Québec libre)
7. Divide And Conquer
8. Blown To Pieces
9. Out Of My Life
10. What Do You Say
11. We Are Lords
12. Power Corrupts
13. Worldly Grace
14. Parfait Perdant
15. Crazy

== Personnel ==
- Manu Eveno – guest artist, oud
- Mike Fraser – mixing
- Ben Kaplan – engineer
- Howie Weinberg – mastering
