= Meltdown (GrimSkunk album) =

Studio album by GrimSkunk
- Released: 1996
- Genre: Hard rock, progressive rock, punk rock
- Length: 47:44
- Label: Indica Records (Canada)
- Producer: Glen Robinson

GrimSkunk chronology
Grim Skunk (1994)	Meltdown (1996)	Autumn Flowers - Rerolled (1997)

Meltdown is the second album by Canadian rock group GrimSkunk released in 1996. The title of the song P.C.P. is an acronym for Problème de Consommation Personnelle meaning personal consumption problem related to drug use and features Uncle Costa and Shantal Arroyo on lead vocals. A video was made for No Sympathy. The songs Lord Ogre and Fat Al's Illness are rerecorded versions from the Fatal Illness days, the latter being a wordplay on the band's early name.

== Track listing ==
1. Ouverture In E Minor
2. Rigpa
3. East Coast
4. No Sympathy
5. Self Inflicted Stress
6. Le gouvernement songe
7. La vache
8. Lord Ogre
9. Dead End Violence
10. Dope Vibe Moon
11. Feeling Severe
12. Brussels 109
13. P.C.P.
14. Colorblind
15. Inner Piece
16. Fat Al's Illness
