= Marilyn Manson (band) =

American rock band

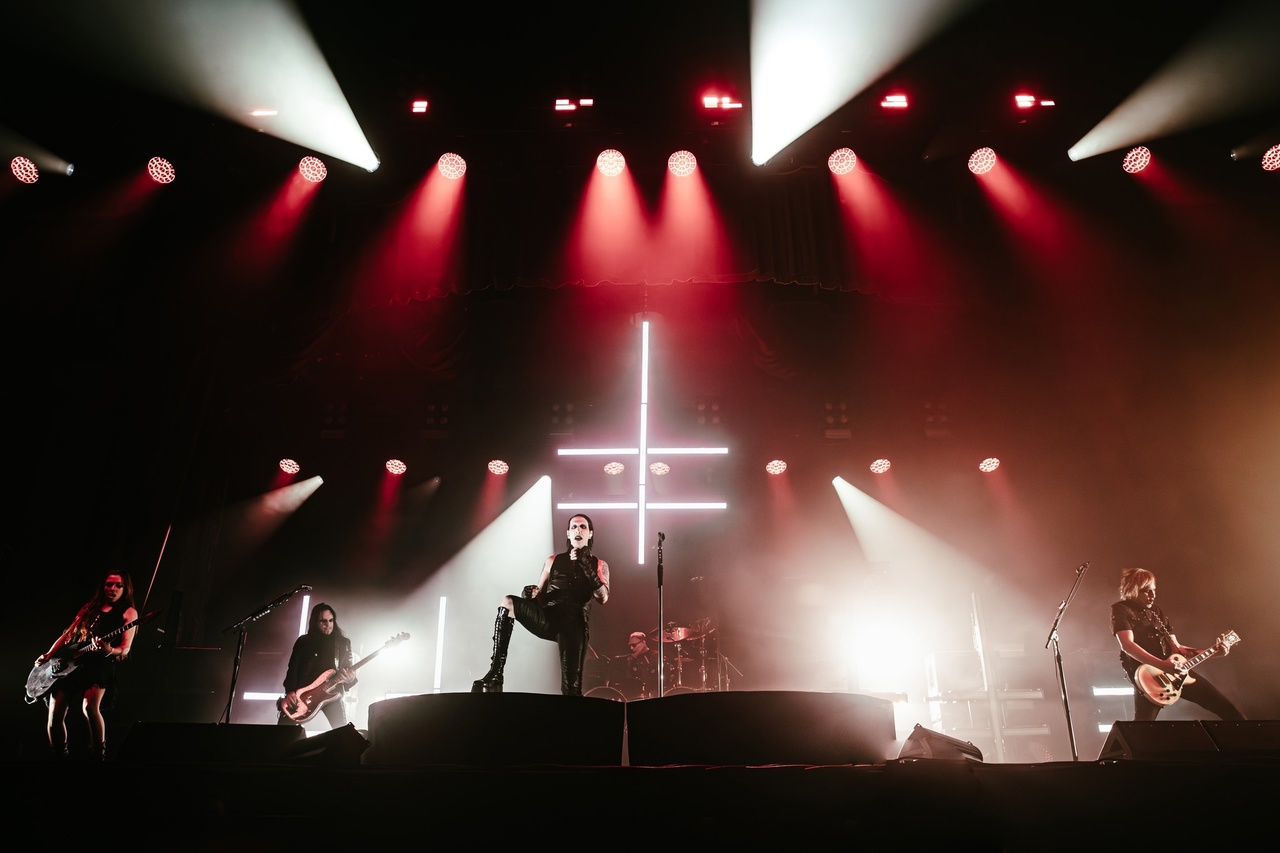
- Marilyn Manson performing at Aragon Ballroom in 2024. From left to right: Reba Meyers, Piggy D., Marilyn Manson, Gil Sharone (background) and Tyler Bates

Background information
- Also known as: Marilyn Manson & the Spooky Kids (1989–1992)
- Origin: Fort Lauderdale, Florida, U.S.
- Genres: Industrial rock; gothic rock; industrial metal; shock rock; alternative metal
- Years active: 1989–present
- Labels: Nothing; Interscope; Cooking Vinyl; Hell, etc.; Loma Vista; Caroline; Nuclear Blast
- Members: Marilyn Manson; Gil Sharone; Piggy D.; Tim Skold; Nick Annis
- Past members: Zsa Zsa Speck; Olivia Newton Bundy; Gidget Gein; Sara Lee Lucas; Daisy Berkowitz; Zim Zum; John 5; Madonna Wayne Gacy; Ginger Fish; Chris Vrenna; Fred Sablan; Twiggy Ramirez; Juan Alderete; Tyler Bates
- Website: marilynmanson.com

Marilyn Manson is an American rock band formed by namesake lead singer Marilyn Manson and lead guitarist Daisy Berkowitz in Fort Lauderdale, Florida, in 1989. Originally named Marilyn Manson & the Spooky Kids, they gained a local cult following in South Florida in the early 1990s with their theatrical live performances. In 1993, they were the first act signed to Trent Reznor's Nothing Records label. Until 1996, the name of each member was created by combining the first name of a female sex symbol and the last name of a male serial killer, as for the band and lead singer name that combine Marilyn Monroe with Charles Manson. Their lineup has changed between many of their album releases; the eponymous lead singer is the only remaining original member.

In the past, band members dressed in outlandish makeup and costumes, and engaged in intentionally shocking behavior both onstage and off. Their lyrics often received criticism for their anti-religious sentiment and references to sex, violence and drugs, while their live performances were frequently called offensive and obscene. On several occasions, protests and petitions led to the group being blocked from performing, with at least three US states passing legislation banning the group from performing at state-owned venues. They released a number of platinum-selling albums, including Antichrist Superstar (1996) and Mechanical Animals (1998). These albums, along with their highly stylized music videos and worldwide touring, brought public recognition to Marilyn Manson.

In 1999, news media falsely blamed the band for influencing the perpetrators of the Columbine High School massacre. As this controversy began to wane throughout the 2000s, so did the band's mainstream popularity. Despite this, Jon Wiederhorn of MTV, in June 2003, referred to Marilyn Manson as "the only true artist today". Marilyn Manson is widely regarded as being one of the most iconic and controversial figures in rock music, with the band and its lead singer influencing numerous other groups and musicians, both in metal-associated acts and also in wider popular culture. VH1 ranked Marilyn Manson as the seventy-eighth best rock band on their 100 Great Artists of Hard Rock. They were inducted into the Kerrang! Hall of Fame in 2000 and have been nominated for four Grammy Awards. In the U.S., the band has seen ten of its releases debut in the top ten, including two number-one albums. Marilyn Manson have sold in excess of 50 million records worldwide.

== History ==
=== Formation and the Spooky Kids (1989–1992) ===
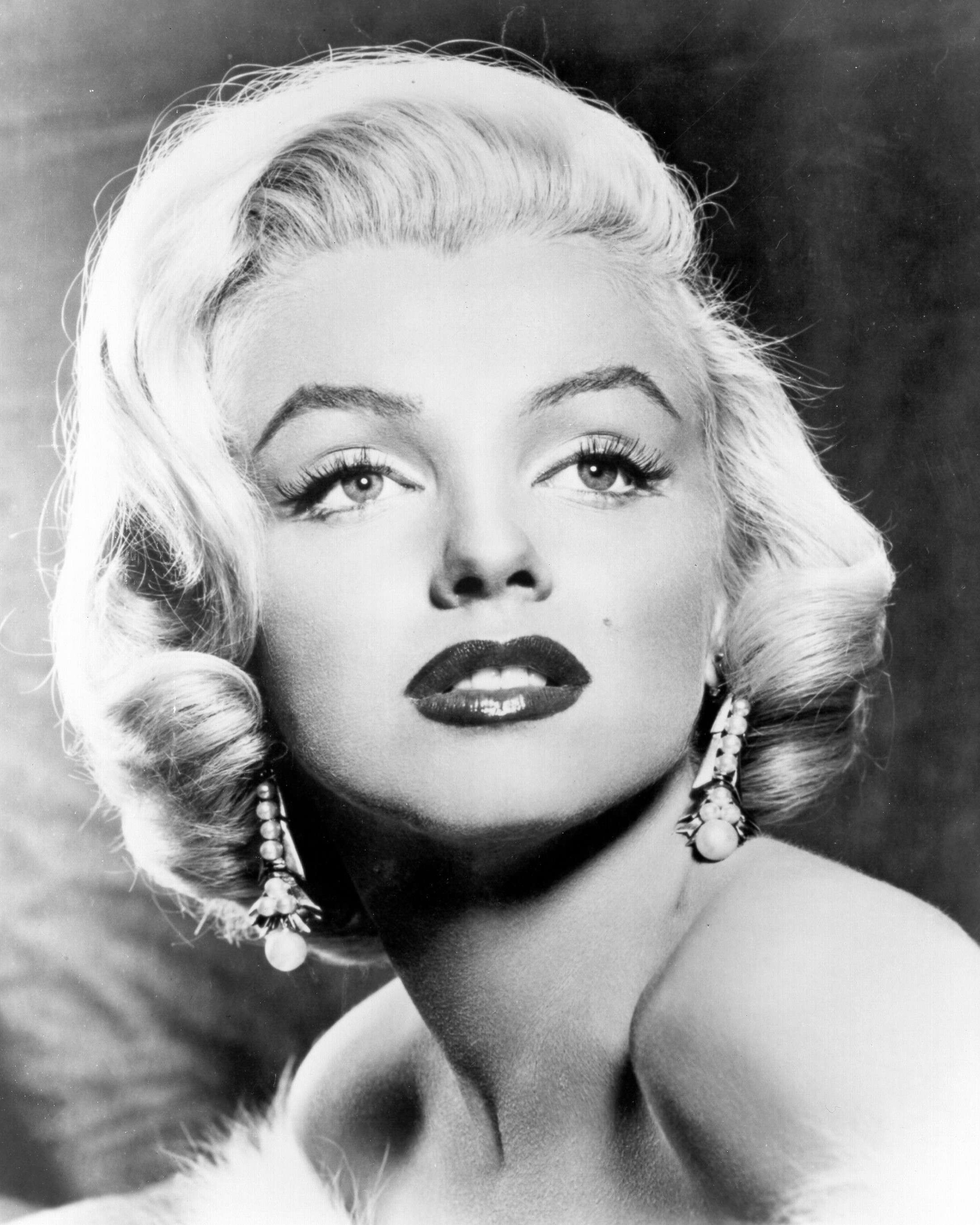
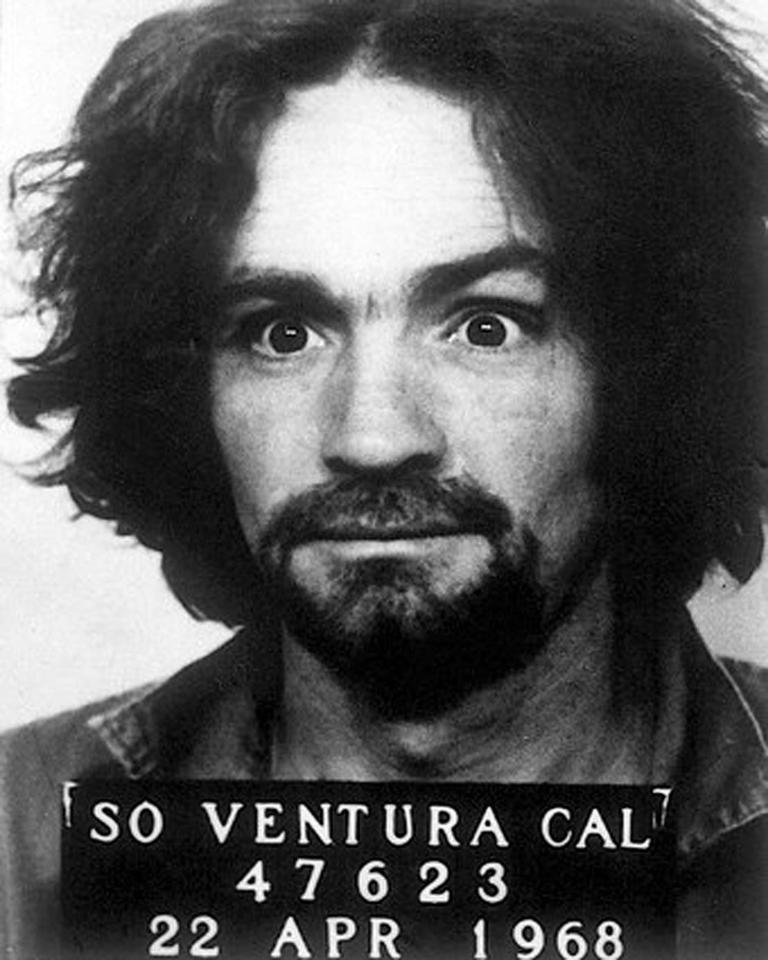
Marilyn Monroe and Charles Manson are the band's namesakes.

In 1989, Brian Warner was a college student working towards a degree in journalism at Broward College, gaining experience by writing music articles for the South Florida lifestyle magazine 25th Parallel. It was in this capacity that he met several of the musicians to whom his own band would later be compared, including My Life with the Thrill Kill Kult and Trent Reznor of Nine Inch Nails. That December, he met Scott Putesky, who proposed the two form a band, after reading some lyrics and poems written by Warner. Warner, guitarist Putesky and bassist Brian Tutunick recorded their first demo tape as Marilyn Manson & the Spooky Kids in 1990, taking on the stage names of Marilyn Manson, Daisy Berkowitz and Olivia Newton Bundy, respectively. Bundy left the band soon after, and was replaced by Gidget Gein, born Brad Stewart. They were later joined on keyboard by Stephen Bier, who called himself Madonna Wayne Gacy. In 1991, drummer Fred Streithorst joined the band under the name Sara Lee Lucas.

The stage names adopted by each member were representative of a concept the band considered central: the dichotomy of good and evil, and the existence of both, together, in every whole. "Marilyn Monroe had a dark side", explained Manson in his autobiography, "just as Charles Manson has a good, intelligent side." Over the next six years, all of the band's members would adopt names that combined the first name of a female sex symbol and the surname of a serial killer. Images of both Monroe and Manson, as well as of other famous and infamous figures, were common in the band's early promotional materials.

The Spooky Kids' popularity in the area grew quickly and because of the band's highly visual concerts, which drew from performance art and used many shock techniques such as "naked women nailed to a cross, a child in a cage, or bloody animal body parts." Band members variously performed in women's clothing or bizarre costumes; and, for lack of a professional pyrotechnician, would set their own stage props on fire. The band would contrast these theatrics with elements drawn from their youth: characters from 1970s and '80s children's television made regular, often grotesquely altered, appearances on band flyers and newsletters, and were frequently sampled in their music. They continued to perform and release cassettes – shortening their name to Marilyn Manson in 1992 – until the summer of 1993, when they drew the attention of Reznor, who had just founded his own label, Nothing Records.

=== Portrait of an American Family and Smells Like Children (1993–1995) ===
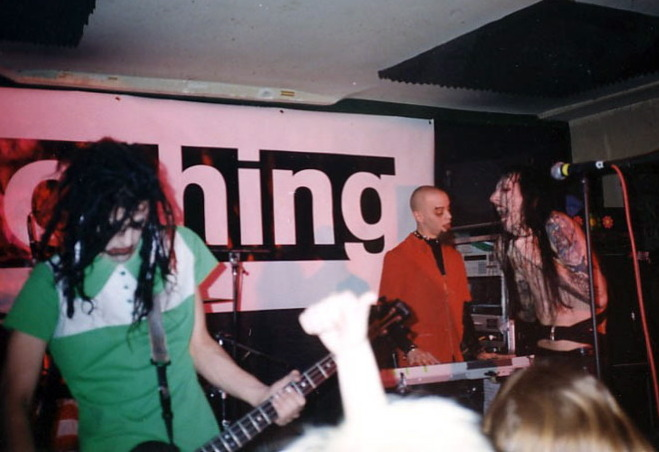
Left to right: Twiggy, Gacy and Manson performing at the "A Night of Nothing" industry showcase, 1996

Reznor offered the band a contract with the label, as well as an opening slot supporting Nine Inch Nails on their upcoming "Self Destruct Tour". After accepting both offers, recording sessions for their debut studio album began in July 1993 with Swans producer Roli Mosimann at Criteria Studios in Miami, Florida. Recording a selection of new songs along with material from their Spooky Kids repertoire, the first version of their debut, titled The Manson Family Album, was completed by the end of the month. However, it was not well received. The band's members, along with Reznor, criticized Mosimann's production as being flat, lifeless and poorly representative of the band's live performances. At the same time, Gidget Gein had begun to lose control of his addiction to heroin. Before reworking the album, the band played two shows in Florida under the name Mrs. Scabtree. This band featured Manson on drums, Gacy on keyboard, Berkowitz on guitar, and Jessicka from Jack Off Jill sharing vocal duties with Jeordie White of Coral Springs thrash band Amboog-a-Lard. Four other local musicians, bassists Mark Dubin of Sister Venus and Patrick Joyce from The Itch, guitarist Miles Hie and violinist Mary Karlzen were also involved.

Reznor agreed to rework production of The Manson Family Album in October 1993 at Record Plant Studios in Los Angeles. Gein, who had been hospitalized after his fourth heroin overdose, was not invited to participate, and was fired from the band soon after, replaced by White, of Amboog-a-Lard, who undertook the alias Twiggy Ramirez. After seven weeks of mixing, re-recording and remixing, the album – now titled Portrait of an American Family – was presented to Nothing's parent label Interscope. The album was released on July 19, 1994, and peaked at number thirty-five on Billboard's Top Heatseekers album chart. The band began its first national headlining tour in December 1994, with Jack Off Jill opening. During the band's stint as opening act on the Nine Inch Nails tour, Manson met Church of Satan founder Anton LaVey. LaVey bestowed the title of "Reverend" on Manson– meaning a person who is revered by the church, and not necessarily one who dedicates their life to preaching the religion to others, as with a priest or minister. Manson would use this title in the liner notes of the band's following album, citing himself as "Reverend Marilyn Manson".

In March 1995, the band began a two-month tour, this time with Monster Voodoo Machine as support. This would be drummer Sara Lee Lucas's last tour with the band. Kenneth Wilson, better known by his stage name Ginger Fish, then joined the group before they embarked on a tour with rock band Danzig and metal band Korn. The band then relocated to the new home of Nothing Studios in New Orleans to begin work on remixes and b-sides for Portrait's third single, "Dope Hat", releasing a music video inspired by the boat ride scene from the 1971 movie Willy Wonka & the Chocolate Factory. The proposed single eventually developed into Smells Like Children, which included the band's version of the Eurythmics' "Sweet Dreams (Are Made of This)", their first hit; the song's music video was placed in heavy rotation on MTV, in stark contrast with the "Dope Hat" video, which the same channel had banished to late-night airplay only a few months prior.

=== Antichrist Superstar (1996–1997) ===
This is perhaps the sickest group ever promoted by a mainstream record company.

— Former U.S. Senator Joe Lieberman

The band's second studio album, Antichrist Superstar, was released on October 8, 1996. It was recorded at Nothing Studios with Reznor, Manson, Sean Beavan and former Skinny Puppy member and longtime producer Dave Ogilvie sharing co-production duties; members of both Marilyn Manson and Nine Inch Nails took part in its recording. The process of making the album was a long and difficult one, highlighted by experiments involving sleep deprivation and near-constant drug use, in an effort to create a violent and hostile environment suited to the album's content. During this time, antagonism between band members was high. Daisy Berkowitz, the band's founding lead guitarist, departed the band partway through the album's recording process, with Ramirez performing much of the album's guitar work. Timothy Linton responded to an advert seeking Berkowitz's replacement. He would form a close relationship with Madonna Wayne Gacy, who was responsible for the inclusion of one of the major sources of inspiration for the album: Kabbalah. Breaking with the six-year tradition of naming band members after female icons and serial killers, Zim Zum was chosen as Linton's stage name. It was derived from the Lurianic Kabbalah concept of Tzimtzum. "The Beautiful People" was released as the album's lead single. It created enough anticipation for Antichrist Superstar that the album debuted at number three on the Billboard 200 with first-week sales of 132,000 copies. Manson also appeared on the cover of Rolling Stone, who awarded the band their 'Best New Artist' accolade in 1997. The year-long "Dead to the World Tour" followed, which was the band's longest and widest-ranging tour yet. In the US, however, the band was receiving more attention than ever before, and not all of it was positive. As the tour was getting underway, the band found itself the target of bipartisan congressional hearings, led by conservative violent entertainment watchdog group Empower America (now known as FreedomWorks) co-directors Republican Secretary of Education William Bennett and Democratic U.S. Senator Joseph Lieberman, to determine the effects, if any, of violent lyrics on young listeners. In addition, nearly every performance of the tour was picketed by religious organizations.

In July 1997, Manson collaborated with British trip hop group Sneaker Pimps for the single "Long Hard Road Out of Hell" from the soundtrack to the 1997 film Spawn. The band released their second EP, Remix & Repent, on November 25, 1997. It featured new versions of Antichrist Superstar's four singles: "The Beautiful People", "Tourniquet", "Antichrist Superstar" and "Man That You Fear". In February 1998, Manson released his autobiography, The Long Hard Road Out of Hell, as well as a live video entitled Dead to the World. It was also confirmed that Antichrist Superstar would be the first installment in a concept album trilogy which the band called their triptych.

=== Mechanical Animals (1998–1999) ===
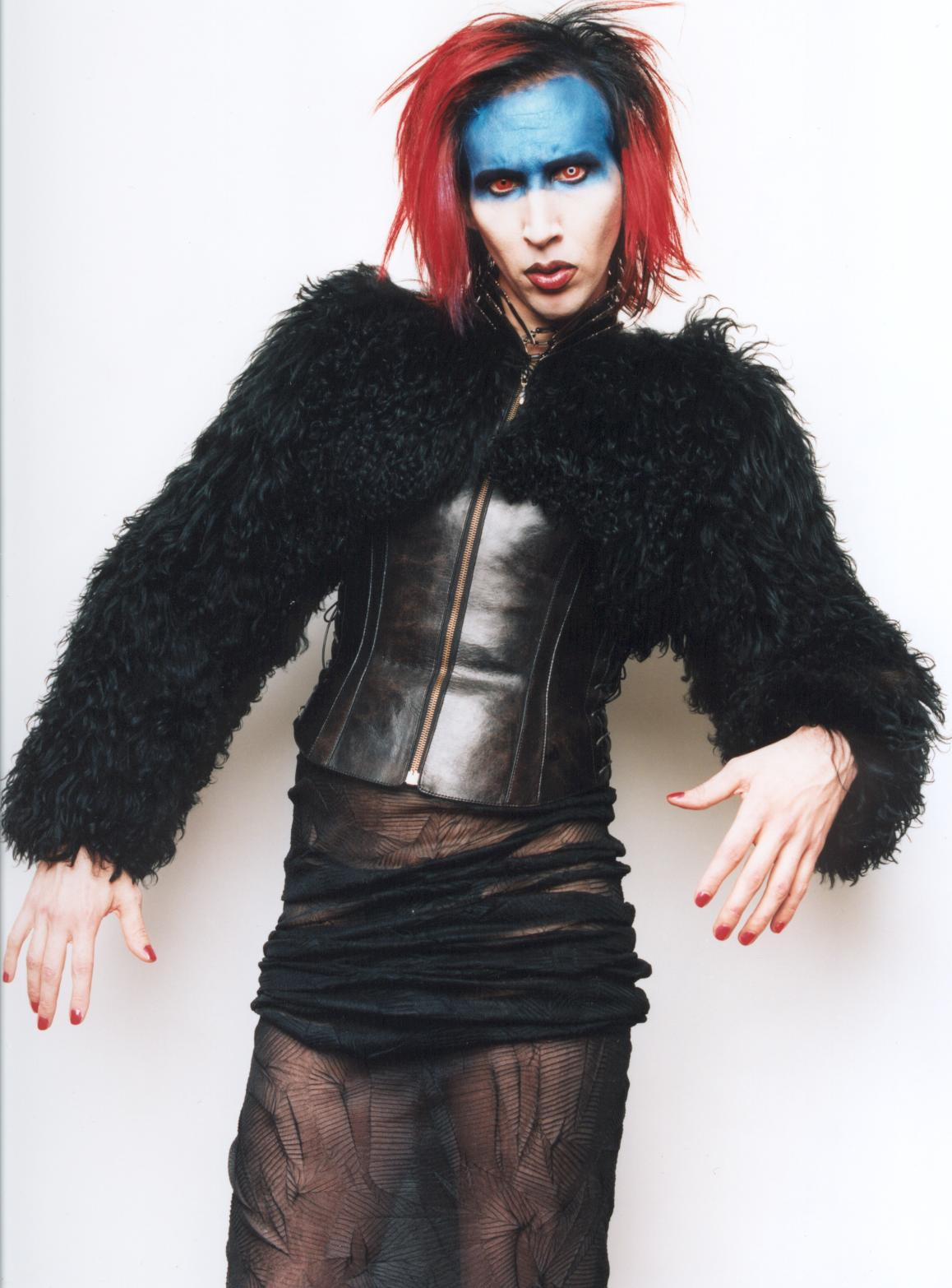
Manson as Mechanical Animals' antagonist, "Omega"

The band released the second part of their triptych, Mechanical Animals, on September 15, 1998. Co-produced by the band's lead singer with Sean Beavan and Michael Beinhorn, the album moved away from the industrial rock production of its predecessor and was strongly influenced by 1970s glam rock, particularly David Bowie's 1974 album Diamond Dogs. Billy Corgan served as an unofficial consultant to the band during the early development of the album. After playing a few songs for him, Corgan advised them that "This is definitely the right direction" but to "go all the way with it. Don't just hint at it", referring to its inclusion of glam influences. To suit their new musical style, the band also recast itself as a glam rock outfit, setting aside the "rotting-corpse chic" of the previous era in favor of attire more suited to the genre, incorporating leather, platform boots and brightly dyed hair. The band also relocated from New Orleans to Los Angeles, while Zim Zum was replaced by guitarist John Lowery of 2wo, whose stage name, John 5, was given to him by Manson during their first lunch meeting.

Interscope's promotion of the album was massive, with the label erecting enormous billboards of the lead singer as an androgynous extraterrestrial in both Times Square and Sunset Strip. Repeated appearances on MTV and other networks helped propel the album's lead single, "The Dope Show", to number twelve on Billboard's Mainstream Rock chart, becoming the band's highest-charting single yet. The song's music video was critically acclaimed, winning two awards at the 1998 Billboard Music Video Awards as well as the Best Cinematography award at the 1999 MTV VMA's; while the song was also nominated for Best Hard Rock Performance at the 41st Annual Grammy Awards. The album would go on to debut at number one on the Billboard 200, with first week sales of over 223,000.

After a brief promotional campaign, the band set out on the "Beautiful Monsters Tour" with Hole. The tour would be a problematic one, and was marred by frequent on–and–off stage exchanges between Manson and Hole vocalist Courtney Love. Private disputes also arose over the tour's financial arrangements, with Hole unwittingly financing most of Manson's production costs, which were disproportionately high relative to Hole's. The tour was to include thirty-seven shows spanning over a two-month period, although Hole left after taking part in just nine of the scheduled dates. A broken ankle from Manson also forced the postponement of the next two shows, with the remainder of the tour being renamed "Rock Is Dead" and Jack Off Jill and Nashville Pussy taking over select opening slots.

The final four dates of the tour were canceled out of respect for the victims of the Columbine High School massacre. The latter half of 1999 and much of 2000 was a period of relative silence for the band, who refused to take part in interviews and retreated from public life. They shelved plans for a proposed single and music video for their cover of AC/DC's "Highway to Hell", which appeared on the soundtrack to Detroit Rock City. They spent this period writing and recording in a secluded studio in Death Valley, with only the live album The Last Tour on Earth appearing during this time. A studio outtake from Antichrist Superstar, titled "Astonishing Panorama of the Endtimes", served as its only single.

=== Holy Wood (In the Shadow of the Valley of Death) (2000–2001) ===
1999 was a pivotal year—as was 1969, the year of my birth. The two years share many similarities. Woodstock '99 became an Altamont of its own. Columbine became the Manson murders of our generation. Things happened that could've made me want to stop making music. Instead, I decided to come out and really punish everyone for daring to fuck with me. I've got a big fight ahead of me on this one. And I want every bit of it.

— Marilyn Manson

Holy Wood (In the Shadow of the Valley of Death) was released on November 11, 2000. Produced by the band's lead singer with Dave Sardy, the album also features programming and pre-production editing by Bon Harris of Nitzer Ebb. The band wrote over 100 songs for the album, which was a return to the darker, more abrasive sound of Antichrist Superstar. Much of its content was written in response to the Columbine massacre, with the album's third single, "The Nobodies", directly referring to the shootings. Described by the band's frontman as the third part of a trilogy which began with Antichrist Superstar and continued in Mechanical Animals, its overarching theme is an exploration of the relationship between death and fame in American culture, and its lyrics and artwork contain many references to John F. Kennedy and Lee Harvey Oswald, John Lennon and Mark David Chapman, and Abraham Lincoln and John Wilkes Booth. The "Guns, God and Government Tour" elaborated on Holy Wood's central theme, and with its logo – a rifle and handguns arranged to resemble the Christian cross – Manson made no attempt to conceal what he saw as the source of that fascination.

The band also revealed that within their concept album trilogy, Holy Wood serves as prequel to Mechanical Animals and Antichrist Superstar despite the latter two preceding Holy Wood in release date. Each album contains its own distinct storyline, which can be linked together to create a larger overarching storyline encompassing all three. Manson has offered this much in the way of an interpretation: "[Holy Wood is about] wanting to fit into a world that didn't want me, and fighting really hard to get there. [The album's deepest elements] are idealism and the desire to start a revolution. If you begin with Holy Wood, then Mechanical Animals really talks about how that revolution gets taken away from you and turned into a product, and then Antichrist Superstar is where you're given a choice to decide if you're going to be controlled by the power that you created or if you want to destroy yourself and then start over. It just becomes a cycle."

The band initially declined to join the 2001 lineup of Ozzy Osbourne's Ozzfest, as its June 21 date in Denver would mark their first appearance in Colorado since the Columbine massacre. After the band announced on their website that they would perform in Denver, they were protested by religious groups. The band planned to "balance out" their "violent lyrics" by quoting biblical texts, "so we can examine the virtues of wonderful Christian stories of disease, murder, adultery, suicide and child sacrifice." The tour was documented by a DVD of the same name, which was released on October 29, 2002. In addition to a compilation style concert [songs from multiple individual shows edited together to appear as a single performance], it includes a thirty-minute short film titled "The Death Parade". This was followed by Guns, God and Government – Live in LA in 2009, which depicts their performance of January 13, 2001, at Los Angeles's Grand Olympic Auditorium in its entirety.

Earlier in 2001, the band released a cover of Gloria Jones's "Tainted Love" on the soundtrack to Not Another Teen Movie. The song became the band's biggest international hit yet, peaking at number one in numerous European territories. In 2002, Jonathan Davis of Korn invited Marilyn Manson to record vocals on a track titled "Redeemer", which was released on his soundtrack to Queen of the Damned. Manson also appeared in Michael Moore's 2002 documentary, Bowling for Columbine; his appearance was filmed on the same day as their Denver Ozzfest performance. When Moore asked what Manson would have said to the students at Columbine, he replied, "I wouldn't say a single word to them. I would listen to what they have to say, and that's what no one did."

=== The Golden Age of Grotesque and Lest We Forget (2002–2006) ===
With the "triptych" of previous albums complete, the band was free to begin a fresh project. In 2002, Manson created an original score for the Resident Evil film with former KMFDM multi-instrumentalist Tim Skold. Soon after, Skold became an official band member when Twiggy Ramirez amicably left the group, citing creative differences. After finding inspiration through Manson's girlfriend Dita Von Teese in the swing and burlesque movements of 1920s Berlin, the band recorded The Golden Age of Grotesque, which was released on May 13, 2003, and debuted atop the Billboard 200 album chart, selling over 118,000 copies on its first week. It was also an international success, particularly in Europe, where it sold over 400,000 copies on its first week, and topping various national record charts, as well as Billboard's European Albums Chart. The album also appeared on several critics' year-end lists, and won a 2003 Metal Edge Readers' Choice Award for "Album of the Year".

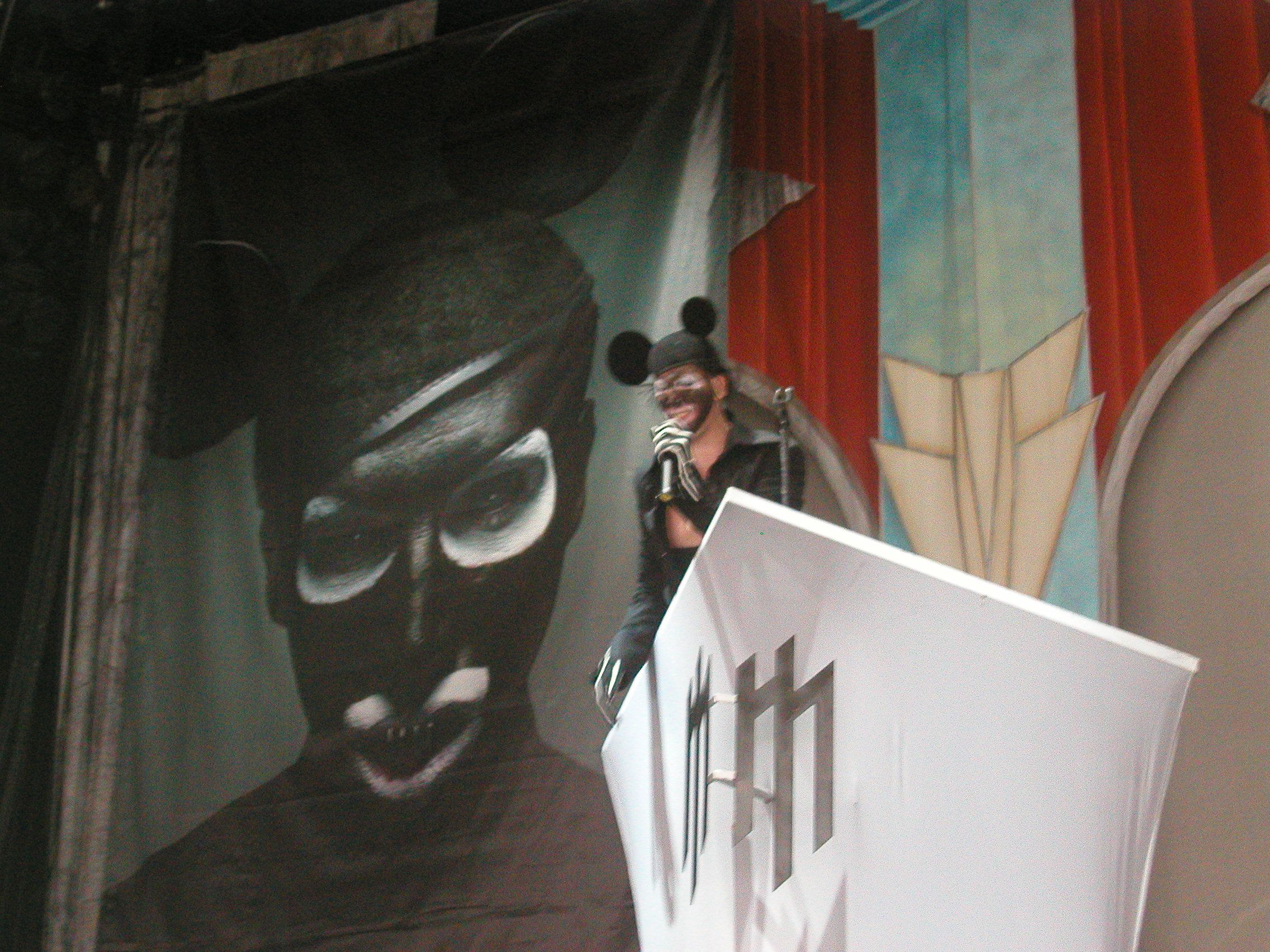
Performing at Ozzfest (2003)

Eschewing the lyrical depth and symbolism found on Holy Wood, the album was relatively straightforward: in an extended metaphor, Manson compares his own often-criticized work to the Entartete Kunst banned by the Nazi regime. Lyrically, Manson utilizes the narrative mode of stream of consciousness throughout the album to examine the human psyche in times of crisis, specifically focusing on the mindset of lunatics and children, as, according to Manson, "they don't follow the rules [of society]." Several songs incorporate elements commonly found in playground chants and nursery rhymes, which Manson would "pervert into something ugly and lurid." The work of Kurt Weill was also noted as an influence, along with the lucid dreams the singer was having during its production, with Manson explaining that he would "wake up and say, 'I want to write a song that sounds like a stampeding elephant,' or 'I want to write a song that sounds like a burning piano.'"

Manson began his long-term collaboration with Austrian-Irish artist Gottfried Helnwein, working together on several multi-media projects associated with the album, including the exhibitions and installation art projects featured at the album's launch party at The Key Club in Los Angeles, the album artwork, the music video to lead single "mOBSCENE", as well as the artwork which accompanied Manson's essay for The Rock and Roll Hall of Fame and Museum. Limited edition copies of the album included a DVD titled Doppelherz (Double-heart), a 25-minute surrealist short film directed by Manson which featured art direction by Helnwein. Another world tour followed, "Grotesk Burlesk", which furthered the album's Weimar Republic-inspired theme by adding Helnwein-created stage dressing and elements of German Kabarett to the group's performances. Manson and the band members began appearing both on-and off-stage in designer suits created by Jean-Paul Gaultier.

Lest We Forget: The Best Of was released on September 28, 2004, and was referred to by Manson as a "farewell" compilation. It was the last album released under Nothing Records, as the label was dissolved following a lawsuit filed by Reznor against his former manager and business partner, John Malm. The compilation was supported by the "Against All Gods Tour", as well as a single–a cover of Depeche Mode's "Personal Jesus". It was the first and only tour to feature Mark Chaussee of Rob Halford's Fight on lead guitar, replacing John 5, whose relationship with Manson had soured over the previous year. Former Nine Inch Nails drummer Chris Vrenna also replaced Ginger Fish, who fractured his wrist, skull and cheekbone after falling several feet off his drum riser during a performance at a German awards ceremony.

=== Eat Me, Drink Me (2007–2008) ===
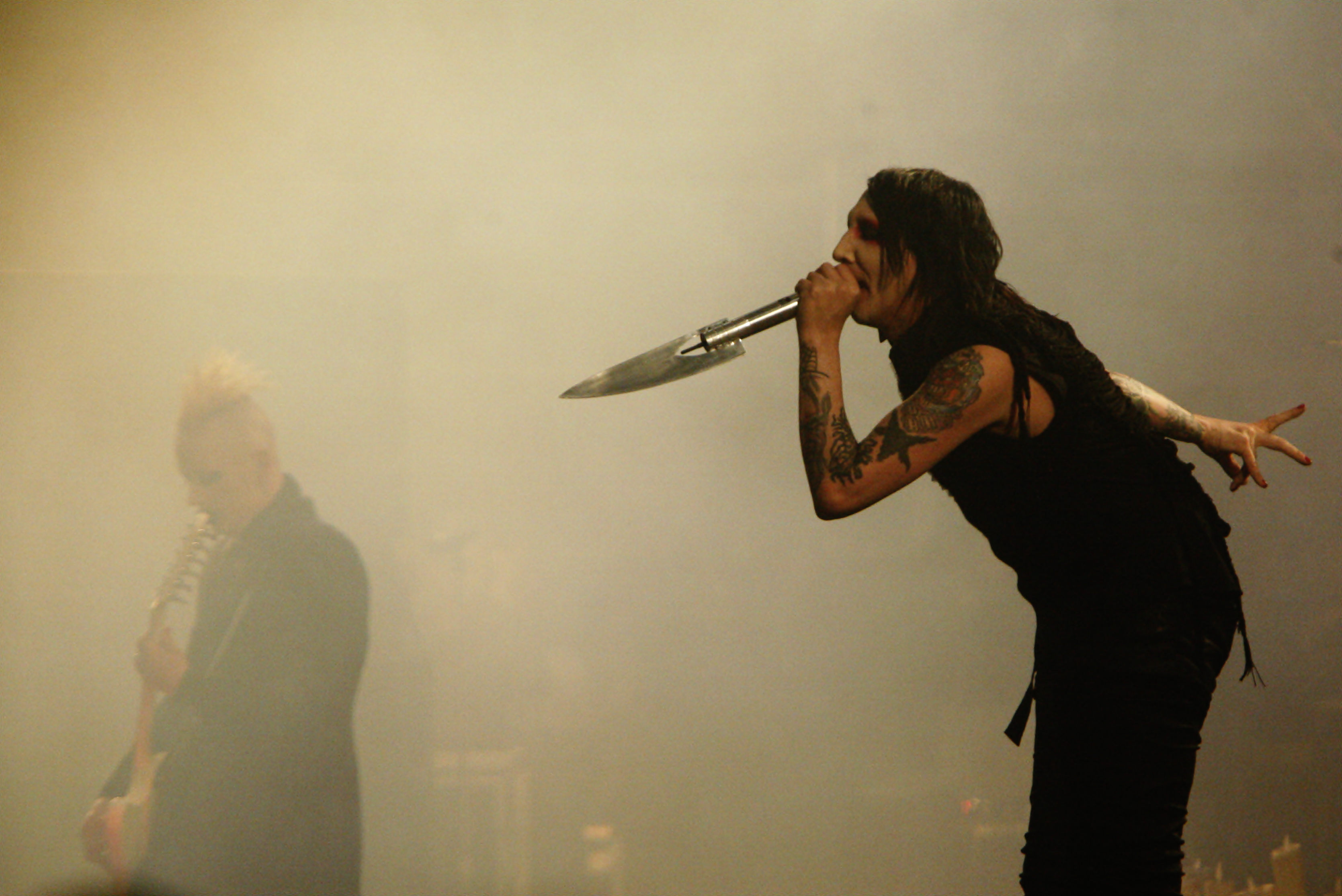
Skold and Manson during the "Rape of the World Tour"

By late 2005, the band had composed 18 new songs, but work on their sixth studio album was halted when Manson focused his attention on various film and art projects, including the development of his screenplay, Phantasmagoria: The Visions of Lewis Carroll, as well as a minor role in the Lucy Liu movie Rise: Blood Hunter. He also launched a self-proclaimed art movement, the Celebritarian Corporation, which included artist Gottfried Helnwein, fashion designer Steven Klein and director Anthony Silva, as well as announcing plans to open an art gallery and publish a book of his paintings. It was after opening the Celebritarian Corporation Gallery Of Fine Art on Melrose Avenue in 2006 that work started on new material, with Manson writing lyrics over Skold's already existing compositions.

The resulting material was composed and recorded entirely by Skold, and does not feature writing or performance contributions from any other member of the band. Its content is largely inspired by personal troubles relating to Manson's failed marriage to Von Teese, and his burgeoning relationship with then-19-year old actress Evan Rachel Wood. The band made their debut appearance on The Tonight Show with Jay Leno on October 31, 2006, performing their cover of "This Is Halloween" from a deluxe edition re-release of The Nightmare Before Christmas soundtrack called Nightmare Revisited (2008). This would be their last performance featuring longtime keyboardist Madonna Wayne Gacy, who would go on to file a $20m lawsuit against the band the following year for unpaid "partnership proceeds".

The album was preceded by the release of a single, "Heart-Shaped Glasses (When the Heart Guides the Hand)", whose music video was shot using director James Cameron's 3D Fusion Camera System technology. The video caused controversy upon release, with several sources claiming that it featured genuine footage of Manson and Wood engaged in sexual intercourse. Wood was reportedly paid "the highest [music] video salary in history" to appear in the video. Eat Me, Drink Me was released on June 5, 2007, and entered the Billboard 200 at number eight with first week sales of 88,000 copies. It also peaked in the top ten of most major international album charts, as well as at number two on Billboard's European Albums Chart. "Putting Holes in Happiness" was released as the album's second single.

To promote the album, the band embarked on the nine-month "Rape of the World Tour", which featured Skold on lead guitar, former The Prodigy bassist Rob Holliday and longtime drummer Ginger Fish; while Vrenna rejoined the band as their live keyboardist. The first leg of the tour was a co-headlining set with American thrash metal band Slayer, with support coming from Bleeding Through. In November 2007, Manson confirmed that he and Skold had begun work on the band's next studio album, with Slayer's Kerry King, former The Smashing Pumpkins guitarist James Iha and Nick Zinner of Yeah Yeah Yeahs set to feature. By the beginning of 2008, however, Twiggy Ramirez had rejoined the band as bassist, resulting in the exit of Skold, with Holliday moving from bass to lead guitar for the remaining duration of the tour. Future collaborations with Skold were not ruled out.

=== The High End of Low (2009–2010) ===
In 2008, former Limp Bizkit guitarist Wes Borland joined the band for their headlining show at the 2008 ETP Fest in South Korea. However, Borland left the group to reunite with Limp Bizkit, later saying that he was reluctant to be a "hired gun", citing the band's refusal to record any of the nine songs he submitted for their upcoming album. R&B singer Ne-Yo claimed in early December that he would hold writing sessions with the band's frontman on new material, although Manson denied it, saying that he had "never even met Ne-Yo. I can assure him that he would not want to be associated with something this godless."

The High End of Low was recorded throughout 2008, with Manson recording vocals at his Hollywood Hills home studio between November and January 5, 2009. Produced by Manson, Twiggy and Vrenna with Antichrist Superstar and Mechanical Animals co-producer Sean Beavan, Manson described the album as containing "extreme" autobiographical content relating to the dissolution of his engagement to Wood, and as being "very ruthless, heavy and violent". Its fifteen songs appear on the album in the order they were written. The penultimate track, "Into the Fire", portrays the vocalist's mental state on Christmas Day, wherein he attempted to contact Wood 158 times, cutting himself with a razorblade on the face or hands for each corresponding attempt. The album's final song, "15", was completed on Manson's January 5 birthday – hence the name. Manson utilized his entire home as a canvas to document the disintegration of the relationship, writing its lyrics on walls and coupling them with paintings and drawings relating to Wood, as well as used condoms, bags of cocaine and other drug paraphernalia.

"Arma-goddamn-motherfuckin-geddon"
Album version, as it appeared on The High End of Low. A heavily-censored version of the track performed poorly on US radio.

"We're from America" was released as a free download on the band's website on March 27, 2009, while a Hot Topic-exclusive CD single followed two weeks later. After playing an instrumental version of "Arma-goddamn-motherfuckin-geddon" to Interscope's A&R department, it was chosen as the album's official lead single, with an employee telling Manson, "This is gonna be a hit!". Manson then quipped to the employee, "Well, I'm glad that you have no consideration for what I [might] put on top of it." A heavily censored version of the profanity-laced track – re-titled to "Arma ... geddon" – was serviced to radio from April 13, and peaked at number thirty-seven on Billboard's Mainstream Rock chart, becoming their lowest-peaking single in the process. The album was released on May 20, 2009, and debuted at number four on the Billboard 200 with sales of over 49,000 copies, their lowest opening week figure since The Last Tour on Earth debuted with 26,000 copies in 1999.

Prior to The High End of Low's release, Manson made a series of disparaging comments regarding Interscope and its artistic censorship; as well as its then-CEO Jimmy Iovine, who Manson said "wasn't smart enough to understand what [we] do", and publicly claiming that the label "cares more about Vitamin Water [the private equity venture of Interscope-signed 50 Cent] than music." Reznor – who, as of 2015, remains friends with Iovine – responded by calling Manson a "dopey clown" and claiming that "He is a malicious guy and will step on anybody's face to succeed and cross any line of decency." While promoting the album in the UK, Manson appeared inebriated in a series of interviews. An interview for Alan Carr: Chatty Man recorded during this time remains unaired, due to graphic language and content. A music video for "Running to the Edge of the World" – in which Manson beats a Wood lookalike to death – was released on November 4 and was condemned as a perceived glorification of violence against women. The band parted ways with Interscope on December 3. They settled the lawsuit filed by former keyboardist Stephen Bier (aka M.W. Gacy), with Manson's insurance company paying Bier's attorney's fees and Bier receiving no monetary value.

=== Born Villain (2011–2013) ===
Upon parting with Interscope, Manson said "a lot of the creative control on which my hands were tied [has been regained]", while stating that the band had been writing new material while touring their previous album. Manson attested that its lyrical content would be "more romantic" yet "self-abusive", and described its sonic elements as being "suicide death metal". Fred Sablan joined the band in July 2010. By October, Twiggy described the album as being "almost done", and opined that "It's our best record yet. I mean, everyone always says that, but I think this is our best work so far. It's kind of like a little more of a punk rock Mechanical Animals, without sounding too pretentious." The following month, it was announced that the band had signed a joint-venture deal with London-based indie label Cooking Vinyl. As part of the deal, the band would retain creative control over their artistic direction, with the band and label sharing profits equally after the label recoups costs associated with marketing, promotion and distribution.

For much of 2011, Manson removed himself from the public spotlight and ceased almost all communication with fans, only taking a break from his self-imposed sequestration to appear in the music video for "Tempat Ku" by Brunei rock band D'Hask. On February 24, longtime drummer Ginger Fish announced his resignation from the group. On May 22, their website underwent a complete overhaul. A 26-second clip of an unreleased song, tentatively titled "I am among no one", was uploaded to their Vimeo account, along with a new logo.

After being impressed by his directorial work on one of Kid Cudi's music videos, Manson employed actor Shia LaBeouf to direct a short film entitled Born Villain. Contrary to media reports that the project would be a "making-of" video documenting the album's recording, Born Villain was a surrealist short featuring a previously unreleased track, "Overneath the Path of Misery". Containing numerous references to Macbeth, it was inspired by Jodorowsky's The Holy Mountain and Luis Buñuel and Salvador Dalí's 1929 silent film Un Chien Andalou. To promote the project, LaBeouf and his girlfriend, photographer Karolyn Pho, graffitied areas of LA with its artwork. LaBeouf and Pho later photographed their work, and released it as a limited edition book titled Campaign, which was bundled with a DVD of the film. In November, Vrenna departed the band to focus on other production work, whilst indicating that production of their eighth studio album was "largely completed".

The album was preceded by the release of "No Reflection", which Manson leaked to KROQ-FM on March 7, 2012. Cooking Vinyl CEO Martin Goldschmidt called the leak a "masterstroke", saying "we had all these exclusives lined up around the world, and then Manson blew them all. We're already getting more radio play than the whole of the last record." The song went on to peak at number twenty-six on the Mainstream Rock chart, spending fourteen weeks on the chart, and was their best-performing single there since "Personal Jesus" in 2004. Born Villain was released worldwide from April 25, debuting at number ten on the Billboard 200 and atop both the Independent Albums and Top Hard Rock Albums charts. The album spent two weeks at number one on the UK Rock Albums Chart. A remix EP for "Slo-Mo-Tion" followed on November 5. The band embarked on the seventeen-month "Hey Cruel World... Tour" from the end of April, which was interspersed by co-headlining tours with Rob Zombie ("Twins of Evil") and Alice Cooper ("Masters of Madness").

=== The Pale Emperor (2014–2016) ===
In August 2012, it was announced that Manson would play a fictionalized version of himself in a four-episode arc of the sixth season of TV series Californication. While filming its season finale at the Greek Theatre in LA, Manson met the series' composer, Tyler Bates, and the two discussed a potential collaboration. Manson confirmed that production started on new material by May 2013. Four months later, Sablan announced that he had left the group.

One track from the album, "Cupid Carries a Gun" was used as the opening theme to Salem from its second episode onwards, which premiered on US television on April 27. In October, a large portion of the album track "Killing Strangers" was predominantly featured in the Keanu Reeves movie John Wick. "Third Day of a Seven Day Binge" was released for free download on the band's website on October 26, and served as the album's first official single. The band performed several new songs live for the first time as they played a handful of concerts around southern California in October and early November. "Deep Six" was released on December 16, with a music video following three days later. It went on to peak at number eight on Billboard's Mainstream Rock chart, making it the band's highest-ever peaking single on Billboard. "Cupid Carries a Gun" was released as the album's third official single on January 8, 2015.

The Pale Emperor was released on January 15 in the US. It is dedicated to Manson's mother, who died in May 2014 after an eight-year battle with Alzheimer's disease and dementia. It was both a critical and commercial success, debuting at number eight on the Billboard 200 with sales of over 51,000 copies, their largest opening-week figure since Eat Me, Drink Me in 2007. Numerous publications referred to it as the band's best album in over a decade. It would go on to appear on several 'best of 2015' lists, with Rolling Stone dubbing it the 'best metal album' of 2015. Music videos for both "The Mephistopheles of Los Angeles" and "Third Day of a Seven Day Binge" were released in May and July, respectively.

The band embarked on the nearly-two year-long The Hell Not Hallelujah Tour in support of the album, which was interspersed by a co-headlining tour with The Smashing Pumpkins titled The End Times. In February 2016, Manson contributed vocals to a version of David Bowie's "Cat People (Putting Out Fire)" on Countach (For Giorgio), a tribute album to Giorgio Moroder curated by Shooter Jennings. A 16-bit music video for the song was released five months later. Also in February, details were announced of another co-headlining tour, this time with Slipknot. The tour was scheduled to begin on June 9 in Salt Lake City and consist of thirty-four dates in Amphitheatres throughout North America, with support from Of Mice & Men. However, the first twelve dates of the tour were postponed after an examination revealed that Corey Taylor had broken two vertebrae in his neck. The tour began on June 28 in Nashville, Tennessee, with the postponed shows rescheduled for August.

=== Heaven Upside Down (2017–2018) ===
While touring with The Smashing Pumpkins, Manson indicated a "strong possibility" of working with Corgan on new material, and also revealed plans to collaborate with Korn frontman Jonathan Davis on a "Southern-sounding, acoustic" project. Manson announced in an interview with KEGL in November that work had begun on the band's tenth studio album, while also confirming that Twiggy, Bates and Sharone would all be involved in its recording. Antichrist Superstar was reissued on cassette exclusively in Europe as part of Record Store Day 2016. To celebrate the twentieth anniversary of the album's release, Manson indicated that a special edition of Antichrist Superstar would be issued on October 20, although this failed to materialize. Among its bonus content would have been a previously unreleased film, created during the "Dead to the World Tour".

On July 19, Manson announced that the band's tenth studio album had the working title SAY10, and predicted a release date of Valentine's Day 2017. In September, Manson confirmed that the band were "putting the finishing touches" on the album, and said: "It's not very much in any way like The Pale Emperor. It's pretty violent in its nature for some reason, and it's not emotional in the same way. It's got a chip on its shoulder. I can't wait for people to hear it. I think they're going to be quite surprised." On November 8 – the day of the 2016 US presidential election – Manson released a teaser clip of a new music video created alongside Final Girl director Tyler Shields. It featured scenes of Manson brandishing a knife while standing over a decapitated corpse. According to The Daily Beast's Marlow Stern, the decapitated figure is dressed to resemble Donald Trump. Manson would later say that the figure in the video "wasn't anyone except if you wanted it to be them."

The album was not released in February 2017, and instead a long series of cryptic videos were posted to Marilyn Manson's personal Instagram account over the course of just under 2 months, before Manson revealed on May 9 that the album had been named Heaven Upside Down. The band began their Heaven Upside Down Tour on July 20, 2017, in Budapest. The first single from the album, "We Know Where You Fucking Live", was released on September 11, with the album due to follow on October 6. A second single, "Kill4Me", was released on September 20. The band's founding guitarist, Daisy Berkowitz, died on October 22, 2017, at the age of 49; he had been diagnosed with Stage IV colorectal cancer in 2013. Two days later, Manson announced he had "decided to part ways" with bassist Twiggy, after a rape allegation was made against Twiggy by his former girlfriend, Jack Off Jill vocalist Jessicka; for the rest of the tour, Juan Alderete (formerly of Racer X and The Mars Volta) joined. In July 2018, Manson embarked on the Twins of Evil: The Second Coming Tour in the US with co-headliner Rob Zombie and special guest Deadly Apples.

=== We Are Chaos (2019–2023) ===
In March 2019, Manson announced that he was nearly finished recording his next studio album and that country musician Shooter Jennings was involved. Later that year, drummer Gil Sharone announced he was leaving the band to pursue "other current and future projects", with former Black Flag drummer Brandon Pertzborn hired as his replacement. Manson also revealed that Bates is no longer involved with the group, and that the album would be produced by Jennings and feature contributions from his drummer Jamie Douglass. In July, Manson embarked on the Twins of Evil: Hell Never Dies Tour in the US and Canada with co-headliner Rob Zombie, followed by festivals and headline dates with support from Deadly Apples. The band released their cover of The Doors' "The End" on streaming music services in November, with a limited edition vinyl scheduled to be issued on March 6, 2020. The song was recorded for the soundtrack to the upcoming miniseries The Stand, based on Stephen King's novel of the same name. Manson is set to appear in the miniseries. The band are set to appear as the opening act for Ozzy Osbourne during his No More Tours II series, a North American tour beginning in May 2020. However the tour was eventually cancelled along with Manson's performances after Ozzy Osbourne was diagnosed with Parkinson's disease.

On January 13, 2020, live bassist Juan Alderete (ex-Racer X) was involved in a bicycle accident which left him with a diffuse axonal injury, a type of traumatic brain injury. A GoFundMe page has been created to help cover the cost of his medical expenses. On April 29, Manson and Jennings confirmed they had finished work on the band's eleventh studio album, with both calling it a "masterpiece". On July 28, Manson announced that a new single titled "We Are Chaos" would be released the following day. The next day, the track was released alongside the announcement of the band's upcoming eleventh studio album titled We Are Chaos set for release on September 11, 2020. At the same time, the band revealed the album cover and the track list. The album debuted at number eight on the Billboard 200, making it their tenth top ten release on the chart.

In February 2021, Loma Vista Recordings announced they would not promote or participate in the distribution of any future recordings released by the band, following former girlfriend Evan Rachel Wood and various other accusations that the band's vocalist sexually and psychologically abused them. In November 2021, former band member Tim Skold announced he was again working on new material with Marilyn Manson. In May 2023, Marilyn Manson became active again on social media, posting two new pictures and announcing that there's "something new for you to hear".

=== One Assassination Under God (2024–present) ===
In March 2024, it was announced the band would embark on an arena and amphitheater tour of North America with Five Finger Death Punch. The tour began on August 2, and was interspersed with their own headlining shows. The band consisted of returning members Manson, Bates and Sharone, and new members Piggy D. and Reba Meyers. Their first single in four years, "As Sick as the Secrets Within", was issued on the same day the tour began. "Raise the Red Flag" was released as a single two weeks later, followed by "Sacrilegious" in September. Their twelfth studio album, One Assassination Under God – Chapter 1, was issued on November 22, the 61st anniversary of the assassination of John F. Kennedy. A music video for "One Assassination Under God" was released the same day. The music videos of all four songs were directed by Bill Yukich.

The One Assassination Under God Tour saw the band performing their own headline tour of Europe in February 2025, with a tour of the United States following in May, and subsequent tours throughout the year. They released a cover of Phil Collins' "In the Air Tonight" in April 2025. Bates announced in January 2026 that he had amicably parted ways with the live band in order to focus on his film score work, but said he would be "actively supporting" their upcoming release One Assassination Under God – Chapter 2. The following month, the band announced the Freaks on Parade Tour, a co-headlining tour with Rob Zombie. It will see both bands performing at arenas and amphitheaters throughout the United States in August and September with support from The Hu and Orgy.

The band's former bassist and producer Tim Skold announced his return to the live band in February 2026. Piggy D., and former Black Light Burns guitarist Nick Annis, took over as live guitarists following Meyers' departure to focus on solo work. The second, and final chapter, One Assassination Under God – Chapter 2, was officially announced on June 12, the same day the album's lead single was released, "Exit Wound". "Front Toward Enemy" was released as the album's second single on July 17. Its music video was released four days later. The album was released on August 14.

== Musical style ==
Although the band's music has often been labeled as shock rock by mainstream media, Manson disputes the use of the label, preferring instead to identify his band's music as rock and roll. The band combined industrial, goth, shock rock and metal into a "creative bricolage". AllMusic's Stephen Thomas Erlewine wrote that the band "draws equally from schlock metal, progressive metal, new wave, goth rock, and industrial rock". AllMusic also described the band's music as "glam-influenced industrial metal".The Daily Texan wrote that the band "originally found success during the rise and popularity of nu metal", but "Manson distanced himself from that movement, preferring alternative metal anguish over cookie monster-sounding raps." According to The Evolution of Goth Culture, the goth subculture "resisted this takeover of the goth name by Marilyn Manson and their fans" initially, but the band's music would eventually be identified as being goth rock and industrial metal, even though Manson himself has been reluctant to "pigeonhole" his band as goth or metal. Rolling Stone described the band's music as "heavy, industrialized goth rock", while AllMusic contends that the band merely borrows from gothic rock's imagery. Consequence of Sound wrote that "gothic darkness and industrial rock [pervades] all of" the band's music. Stereogum wrote that "metal has never been an integral part of Manson’s sound" and although the band utilizes "varying degrees [of] gritty, distorted guitar", the magazine suggested that the core of their music was actually pop music.

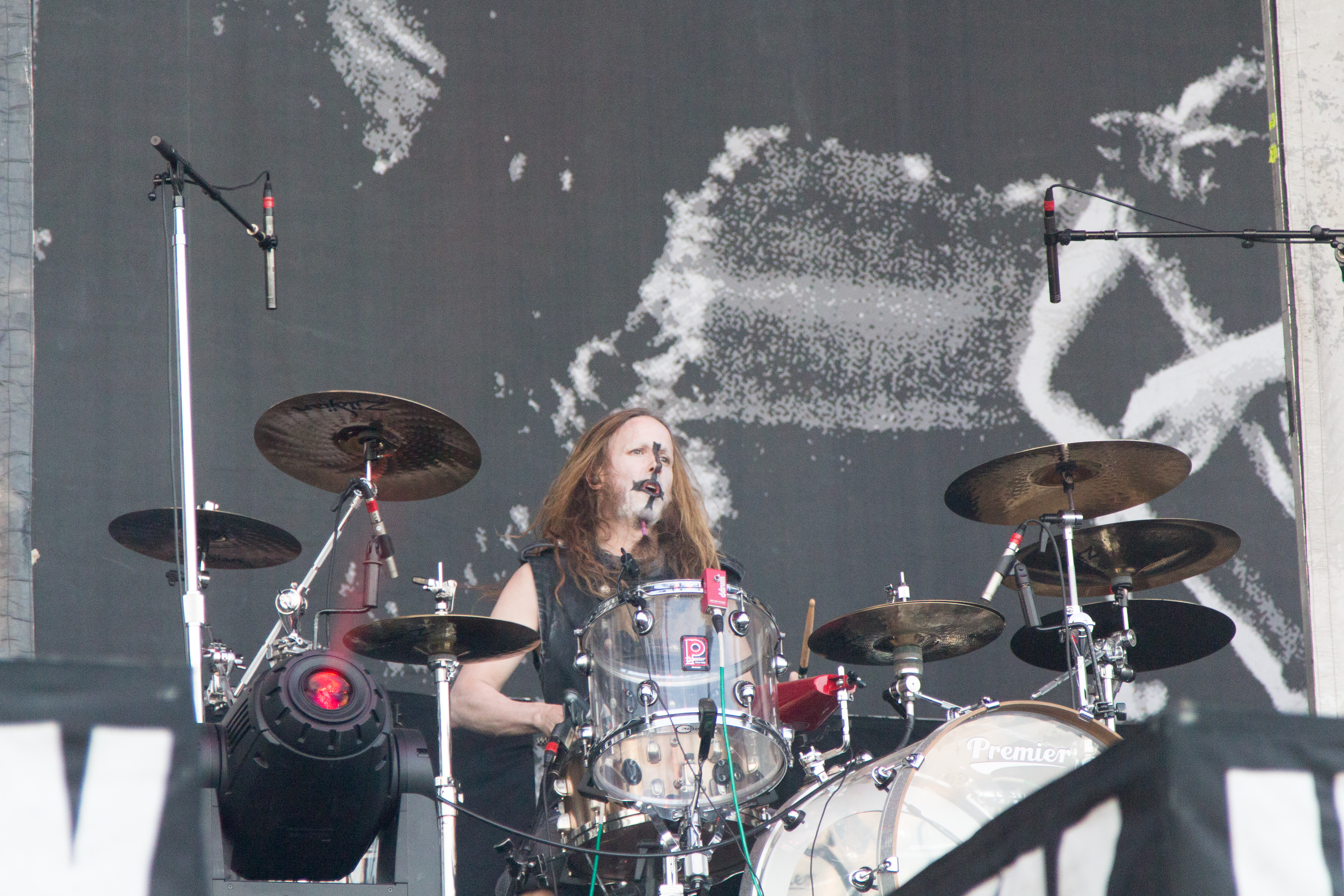
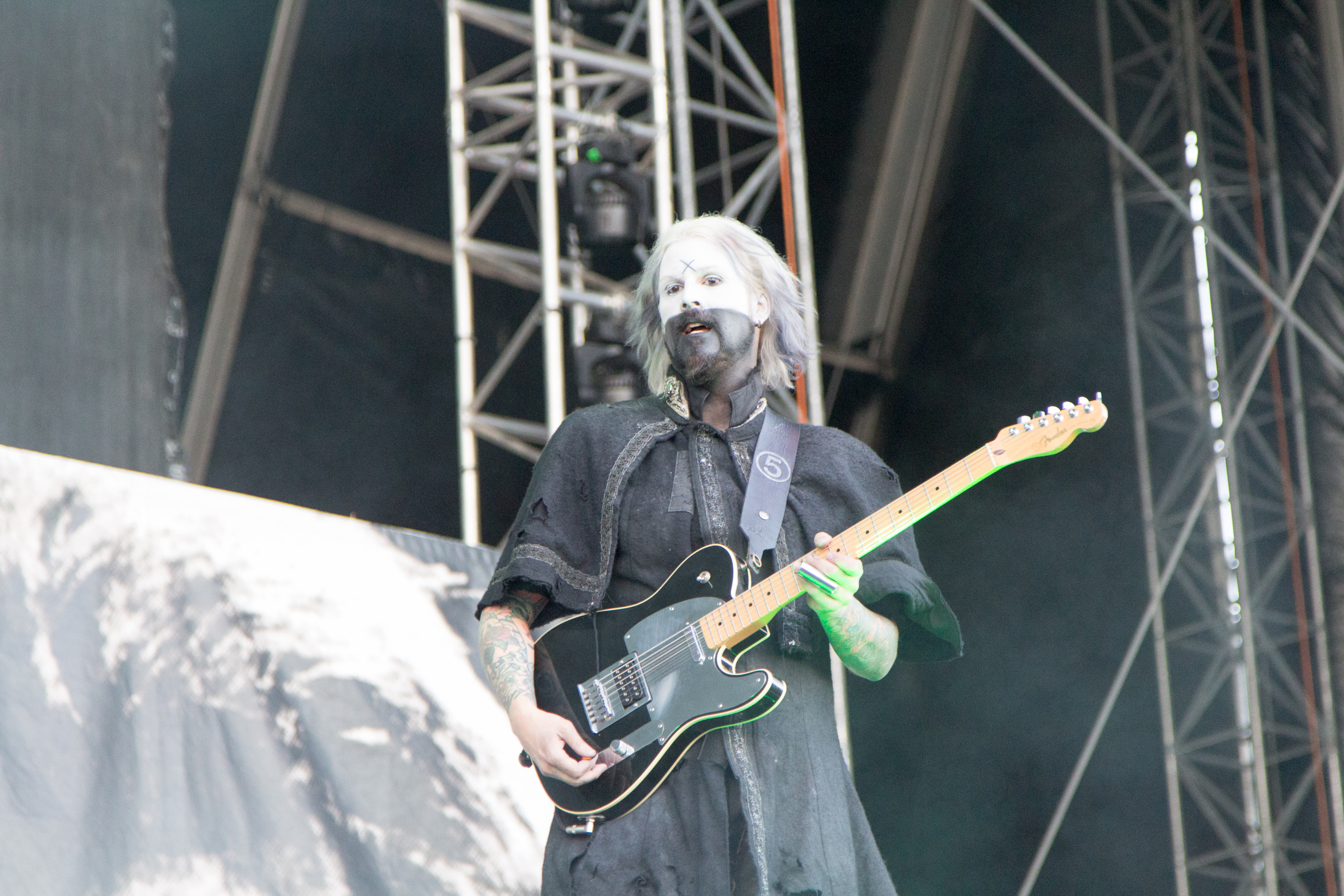
Ginger Fish (left) and John 5 performing at the Nova Rock Festival in Austria with Rob Zombie in 2014

From 1996 to his departure in 2002, Twiggy Ramirez was their chief musical contributor, co-writing many of the band's biggest hits with Manson during this period. Despite never receiving a writing credit, drummer Ginger Fish provided substantial pre-production assistance to both Manson and Twiggy while composing demos for Antichrist Superstar. His drums loops and sound effects would go on to be predominantly featured on several tracks, most notably "The Beautiful People". John 5 and Tim Skold were also prevalent composers, while The Pale Emperor and Heaven Upside Down were composed entirely by Tyler Bates, who joined the band in 2014. Twiggy introduced Manson and musician Shooter Jennings to each other in 2013. Seven years later, the two wrote, recorded and produced We Are Chaos together. Bates returned to his role as composer on the following album, One Assassination Under God – Chapter 1.

All of the band's lyrics are written by Manson, whose songwriting style varies between albums. Utilizing aesthetics often found within spoken-word poetry, his writing features comedy, puns, and double entendres, and he makes frequent use of alliteration. The band's witticisms often take the form of neologisms, delivered several at a time in rapid-fire succession. Lyrical content has emerged from a wide range of subjects, including love, sex and sexuality, sexual abuse, rape, consumerism, politics, revenge, suicide, capitalism, violence and mortality, as well as the Bible and Greek mythology.

Manson predominantly delivers lyrics in a melodic fashion, although he invariably enhances his vocal register by utilizing several extended vocal techniques, such as vocal fry, screaming, growling and crooning. His voice can emit five different tones simultaneously, which mixing engineer Robert Carranza discovered can form a pentagram when imported into a phrasal analyzer. He possesses a baritone vocal type. His lowest bass note of A1 can be heard in "Arma-goddamn-motherfuckin-geddon", while his highest note, an E6 – the first note of the whistle register – can be heard on the Born Villain song "Hey, Cruel World ...".

== Influences ==
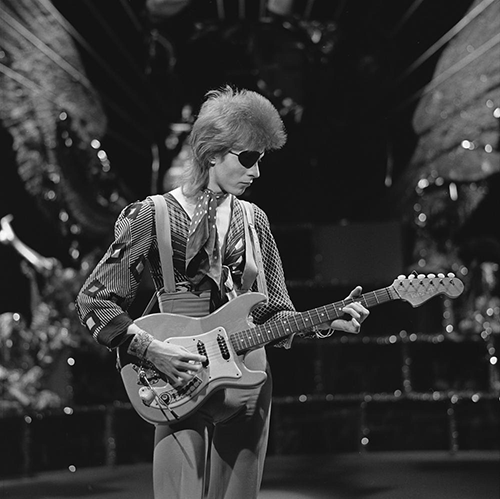
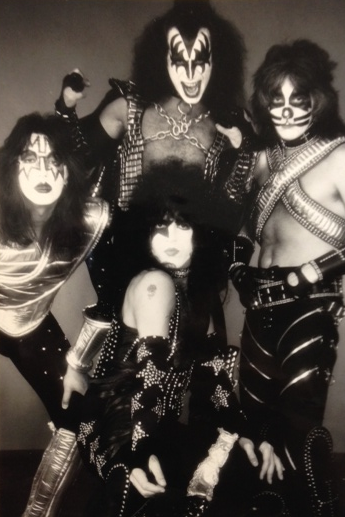
David Bowie (left) and Kiss have heavily influenced Marilyn Manson.

Manson's earliest musical memory was listening to Kiss during a family road trip; he has since cited the band as a major influence. As a child, he would imitate Kiss's kabuki-like makeup and draw pictures of Gene Simmons and Peter Criss. The earliest incarnation of the band was conceived by Manson at a Fort Lauderdale nightclub called The Reunion Room in December 1989, where he was introduced to Big Black's Songs About Fucking by his future keyboardist, Stephen Bier. Daisy Berkowitz played in several punk rock outfits before co-founding the Spooky Kids, and was influenced by acts such as the New York Dolls and the Jim Carroll Band, whose "People Who Died" was covered regularly at live shows.

As its only permanent member, Manson heads the direction of the band's sound; he has been influenced by the shock rock of artists such as Arthur Brown, Alice Cooper, The Doors, Ozzy Osbourne and Iggy Pop. His biggest influence, however, was David Bowie, whom he credited with "changing [his] life forever". The two have often been compared by mainstream media, particularly in relation to their ability to shift genre and style – replete with a new look and musical philosophy – with each studio release. Manson's two favorite songs are Bowie's "Quicksand" and "Ashes to Ashes". For several years, Manson sang Bowie's "Cat People (Putting Out Fire)" as a vocal warm up exercise before live performances; he later covered the song with musician Shooter Jennings.

During their period at Nothing Records, the band's sound gathered sonic elements from other outfits on that label's roster, particularly Nine Inch Nails, with Reznor co-producing their first two studio albums. Manson has cited Queen as an influence on the band's more melodic work, while new wave and synthpop acts such as Depeche Mode and Gary Numan have been noted as influencing their electronic material. Manson said of the latter, "I was always into his apocalyptic fiction lyrics. He pioneered electronic dance music." The work of gothic rock acts such as The Cure and Bauhaus has also been cited, with Twiggy saying that "as far as guitar and bass combinations go", Bauhaus's Daniel Ash and David J were "a really big influence". Manson's other influences include The Beatles, Rihanna, Madonna, Prince, White Zombie, Johnny Cash, Jimi Hendrix, N.W.A, The Smashing Pumpkins, Justin Timberlake, Ministry, Led Zeppelin, the occult, horror comics, and the King James Bible.

== Impact and legacy ==
It's clear Manson isn't merely a freak rocker, media manipulator or one-trick pony. The secret to his longevity lies not in his sometimes schlocky image, but in the content of his work. Not only are his songs sonically compelling and his themes fresh and intriguing, but his actions speak louder than his words. His imagery, sounds and theatrics all still have a point, and like all true artists, he continues to wring significant messages from the lining of his contorted innards. Manson doesn't just bleed for his art. He drinks, pukes, fornicates and risks his life for it.

— Jon Wiederhorn of MTV on Marilyn Manson, 2003

Marilyn Manson have been credited with creating some of the most recognizable and visually defining music videos of the MTV Generation, with some commentators suggesting that their music videos played a significant role in the band's commercial success. Their work frequently incorporates surrealist iconography and purposefully grotesque imagery, and their style has been emulated by other performers. Joseph Schafer of Stereogum said in 2015 that "perhaps no single artist has mastered the music video as a medium so well [as Marilyn Manson]." They have received numerous awards and accolades for their work. Three of their videos – "Sweet Dreams (Are Made of This)", "The Beautiful People" and "The Dope Show" – received a total of five MTV Video Music Award nominations, with the latter winning the Award for Best Cinematography at the 1999 ceremony. The clip for "The Dope Show" also won two awards at the 1998 Billboard Music Video Awards. "The Beautiful People" appeared at number fifty-four on MTV's list of the '100 Greatest Music Videos Ever Made'. as well as at number one-hundred on MuchMusic's 100 Greatest Videos Ever. Their 2003 video for "(s)AINT" was referred to by NME as "one of the most explicit music videos ever made", and was included in lists of the 'Most Controversial Music Videos' by both Time and SF Weekly.

The band have received several Kerrang! Awards throughout their career, and were inducted into the Kerrang! Hall of Fame in 2000. Manson also received their Icon Award in 2005, as well as their Lifetime Achievement Award ten years later. The publication has ranked Holy Wood (In the Shadow of the Valley of Death) as the eleventh greatest rock album of the 2000s, and in 2015 they listed Manson as the twenty-eighth greatest rockstar in the world. VH1 included Marilyn Manson at seventy-eight on their list of the '100 Greatest Artists of Hard Rock', and also included "The Beautiful People" at number eighty-six on their list of the 100 Greatest Hard Rock Songs. Similarly, Gigwise included Manson at number thirty-six in their list of the '60 Greatest Solo Artists of All Time'. In 2016, Manson was presented with an Icon Award at the Alternative Press Music Awards. The band has also received four Grammy Award nominations, including two for Best Metal Performance, along with nominations for Best Hard Rock Performance and Best Hard Rock/Metal Performance. Marilyn Manson have sold over 50 million records worldwide.

Several commentators have referred to the band's lead singer as being one of the most iconic and controversial figures in heavy metal music, with some going so far as to call him a "pop culture icon". Paste magazine said there were "few artists in the 90s as shocking as Marilyn Manson, the most famous of the shock-rockers." Rolling Stone editor Lorraine Ali credited Antichrist Superstar with marking the end of the reign of grunge within popular music, writing that Marilyn Manson "[offered] total escapism as a true alternative", elaborating that the album was "a volatile reaction to five years of earnest, post-Nirvana rock." In 2003, Jon Wiederhorn of MTV called Manson "the only major performer today who can justifiably call himself an artist." Graham Hartmann of Loudwire said that the band's best songs document "a career that is unlike any other that came before", highlighting their mix of a "rock 'n' roll mentality with profound lyrics narrating the progression of society in real time, Manson has developed a polarizing identity as both a beloved hero and a reviled villain." Hannah Ewers of The Guardian wrote in 2016 that the band's music has "never been more relevant [than] at this time of cultural and political turbulence. Whether [his lyrics are addressing] America's gun crime problem, sexual abuse, religious hypocrisy or consumerism, Manson remains a relevant cultural figure rather than a 90s one, because he continues to address the times without lapsing into a parody", and opined: "As long as young people are angry (which they are), he will have listeners."

The band has been noted as influencing numerous groups within metal-associated genres, such as American Head Charge, Babymetal, Black Veil Brides, Combichrist, Kittie, Korn, Motionless in White, Murderdolls, Mushroomhead, New Years Day, September Mourning, Slipknot, and Vanna. Outside of heavy metal, both the band and its lead singer have inspired a diverse group of acts, including the Astroid Boys, Avril Lavigne, Charli XCX, Creeper, Die Antwoord, Eminem, Ghostemane, Grimes, Halsey, Kid Bookie, Lady Gaga, Lana Del Rey, Lil Uzi Vert, Lil Peep, Lisa Marie Presley, Muse, My Chemical Romance, Mykki Blanco, Natalia Kills, Porcelain Black, Salem, Skrillex, Ski Mask the Slump God, Skylar Grey Trippie Redd, and Years & Years. Garbage vocalist Shirley Manson has called Manson an "amazing figure and provocateur and agitator" and said that he was "always challenging you to think about the church, to think about sexuality and to think about society in different ways. We just don't have singers like that anymore." Billy Corgan of The Smashing Pumpkins has commended Manson's manipulation of the culture of celebrity, saying: "He's very savvy, in that he lets people think things about him or plays into things to see what will happen, almost like a performance artist. He's a visionary in a way, because he identified a culture that was coming and now that culture is everywhere."

== Controversies ==
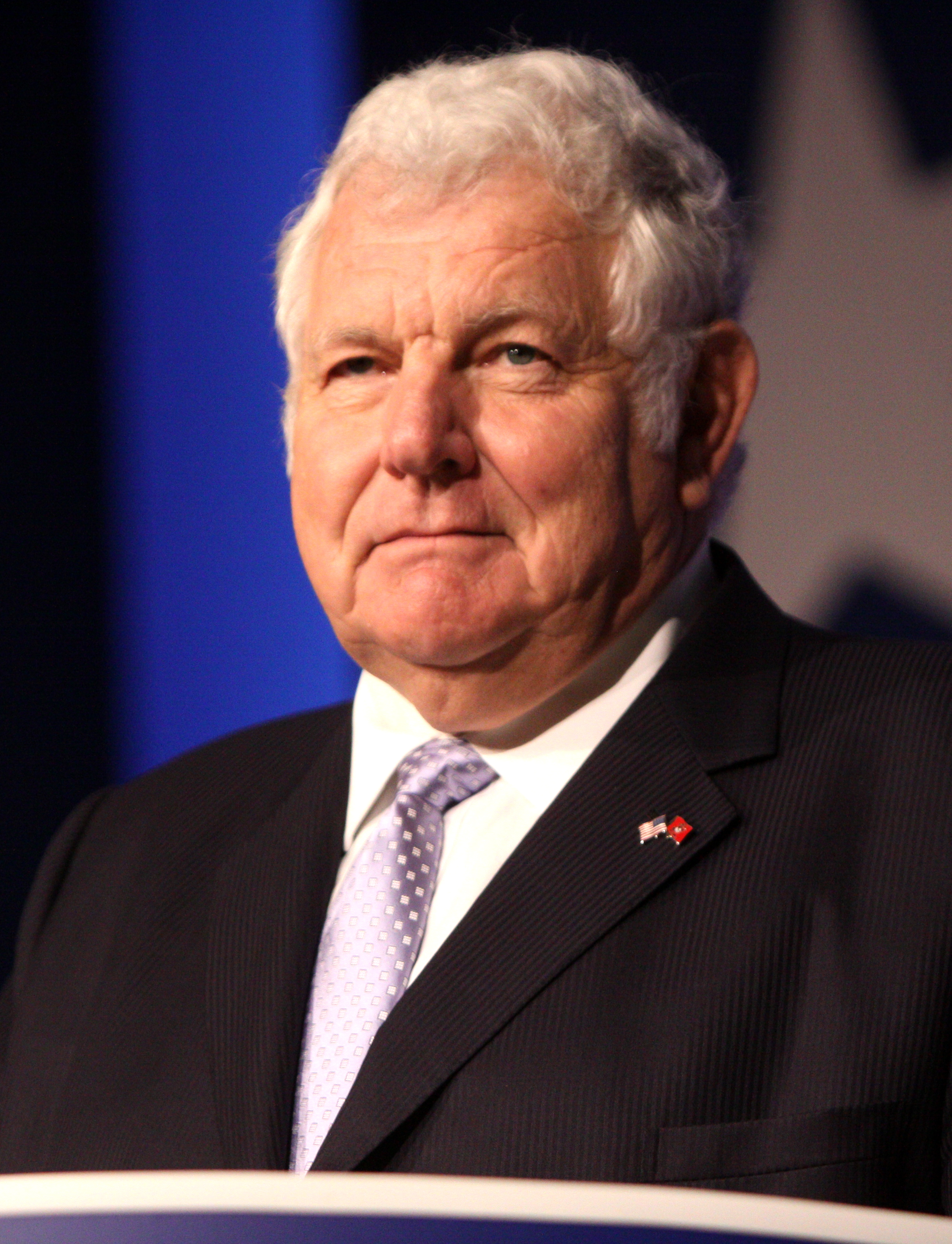
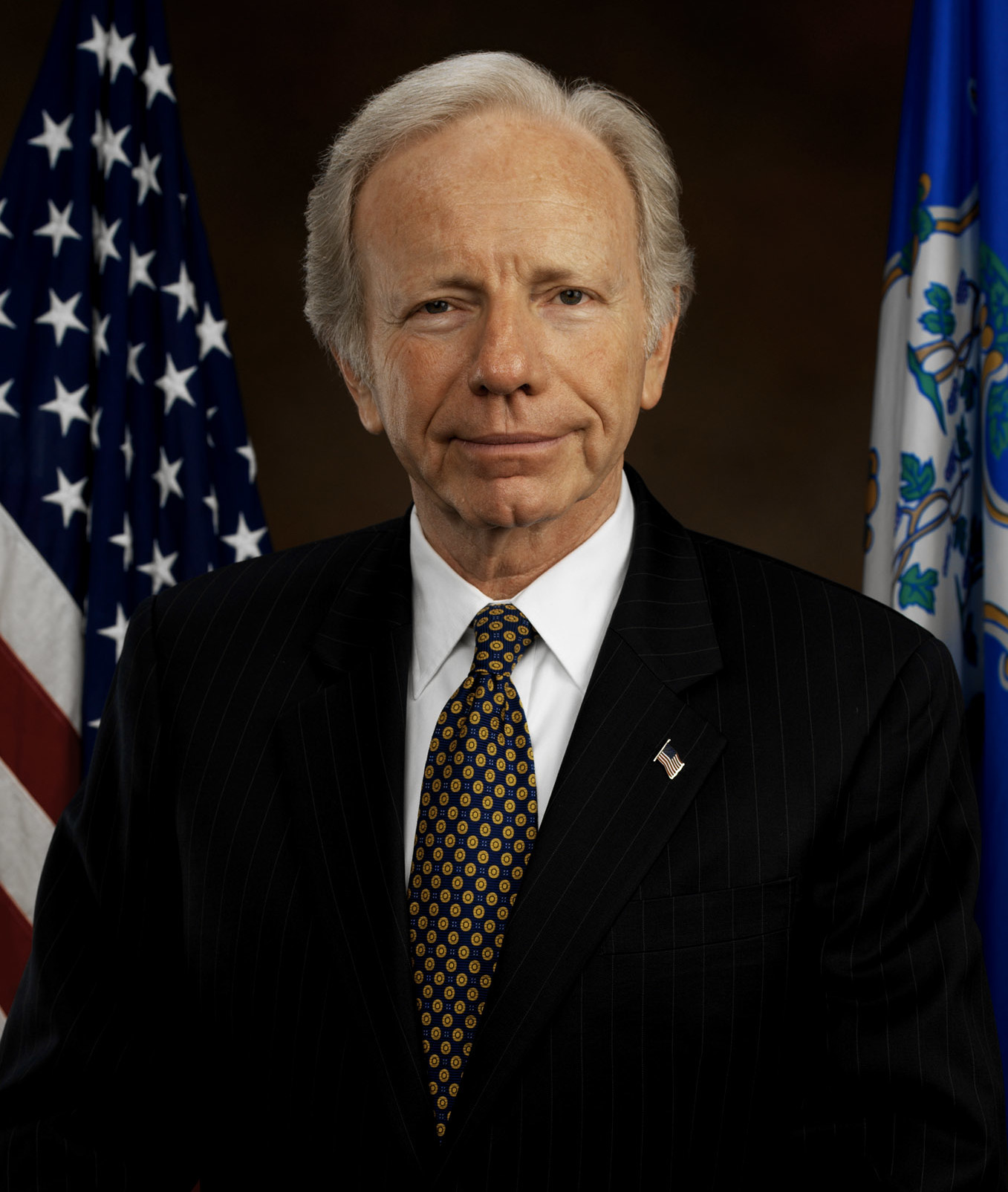
William Bennett (left) and Joe Lieberman, co-directors of the watchdog group Empower America (now known as FreedomWorks), criticized the band on multiple occasions

In December 1996, Secretary of Education William Bennett, along with U.S. Senator Joe Lieberman and former Pennsylvania Secretary of State C. DeLores Tucker, held a press conference wherein they questioned MCA – the owner of Interscope – president Edgar Bronfman Jr.'s ability to head the label competently whilst profiting from "profanity-laced" albums by artists such as Tupac Shakur, Snoop Doggy Dogg and Marilyn Manson. The following November, Representative Sam Brownback chaired a hearing of the Committee on Government Affairs. At this subcommittee, Lieberman once again criticized the band's music, calling it "vile, hateful, nihilistic and damaging", and repeated his request that Seagram – then-owner of MCA – "start ... disassociating itself from Marilyn Manson." The subcommittee also heard from Raymond Kuntz, of Burlington, North Dakota, who blamed his son Richard's suicide on Antichrist Superstar—specifically the song "The Reflecting God".

The band's live performances have also come under fire—the Dead to the World Tour, in particular, was followed by protesters at nearly every North American venue it visited. Several state legislatures, including the Utah State Legislature, South Carolina Legislature and the Virginia General Assembly, enacted legislation specifically targeting the group, which banned them from performing in state-operated venues. These laws would later be repealed, following separate lawsuits from fans, the American Civil Liberties Union, and Ozzy Osbourne, who sued the New Jersey Sports and Exposition Authority after they forced the cancellation of the New Jersey date of the 1997 Ozzfest at Giants Stadium.

On June 30, 2003, the mutilated body of fourteen-year old schoolgirl Jodi Jones was discovered in woodland near her home in Easthouses, Scotland. The injuries sustained by Jones closely resembled those of actress Elizabeth Short, who was murdered in 1947 and was popularly referred to by media as the Black Dahlia. Jones's boyfriend, then-fifteen year old Luke Mitchell, was arrested on suspicion of her murder ten months later. During a search of his home, detectives confiscated a copy of The Golden Age of Grotesque containing the short film Doppelherz. It was purchased two days after Jones's death. A ten-minute excerpt from the film, as well as several paintings by Manson depicting the Black Dahlia's mutilated body, were presented as evidence during the trial. Mitchell was found guilty of murder and sentenced to serve a minimum of twenty years in prison.

The band's scheduled appearance at the Park Live Festival in Moscow on June 27, 2014, was canceled moments before they were due to arrive on stage, after authorities received numerous bomb threats, while hundreds of activists affiliated with the Russian Orthodox Church protested outside the venue. The incident culminated in the assault of several members of the band and crew near their hotel. Two days later, a performance in Novosibirsk was also canceled when authorities refused to grant permission for the show to go ahead, accusing Manson of insulting the beliefs of the Orthodox church and of "promoting sadomasochism". Later that year, Manson garnered significant media attention when a video depicting the simulated rape of Lana Del Rey was posted onto YouTube by production company Sturmgruppe. The video, titled "Sturmgruppe 2013 Reel", showed simulated footage of film director Eli Roth attacking Del Rey, which was interspersed by unrelated images from two of the band's previous music videos—"No Reflection" and "Slo-Mo-Tion". Manson's representatives released a statement to Billboard denying any involvement in the production of the rape scenes.

In October 2017, Twiggy Ramirez was accused of sexual assault by ex-girlfriend Jessicka Addams during their relationship in the mid-90s. Soon after, Manson announced that he had "decided to part ways" with his longterm bassist. Several days later, Ramirez released a statement which said: "I have only recently been made aware of these allegations from over 20 years ago. I do not condone non-consensual sex of any kind. I will be taking some time to spend with my family and focus on maintaining my several years of sobriety. If I have caused anyone pain, I apologize and truly regret it."

=== Alleged influence on school shootings ===
==== Columbine massacre ====
I couldn't care less about those kids' reasoning. What reason do we have to go to war? It's all the same. Killing somebody can't be justified by having a reason. I think it says a lot about the media that those two kids were on the cover of Time magazine twice, because I'm sure that's everything they wanted. They wanted fame. America sold them the idea that an obituary is just another headline.

— Marilyn Manson on the Columbine massacre.

On April 20, 1999, Columbine High School students Eric Harris and Dylan Klebold killed twelve students and a teacher, and wounded twenty-one others before committing suicide. In the days following the massacre, media reports surfaced alleging that they were influenced by violence in entertainment, specifically movies, video games and music. The pair were widely reported as being fans of German bands KMFDM and Rammstein, but the majority of blame was directed at Marilyn Manson.

Five days after the incident, longtime music industry critics Republican former Secretary of Education William Bennett and Democratic U.S. Senator Joseph Lieberman cited the band as a contributing factor to the massacre during an appearance on Meet the Press. Soon after, sensationalist headlines such as "Killers Worshipped Rock Freak Manson" and "Devil-Worshipping Maniac Told Kids To Kill" began appearing in media coverage of the tragedy (such as Fox News). The Mayor of Denver, Wellington Webb, successfully petitioned promoters to cancel KBPI-FM's annual 'Birthday Bash', at which the band was scheduled to appear. Coloradoan politicians such as Governor Bill Owens and Republican Representative Tom Tancredo accused Manson of promoting "hate, violence, death, suicide, drug use and the attitudes and actions of the Columbine High School killers." Later reports stated that neither Harris nor Klebold were fans of Marilyn Manson. The band canceled the remaining four dates of the Rock Is Dead Tour out of respect for the victims, while maintaining that music, movies, books or video games were not to blame.

Eleven days after the massacre, Manson wrote an op-ed piece for Rolling Stone, titled "Columbine: Whose Fault Is It?", where he rebuked the ensuing hysteria and "witch hunt", and castigated US gun culture, the political influence of the National Rifle Association of America, and the media's culpability in similarly violent events in the future – through their irresponsible coverage – in facilitating the placement of blame on a scapegoat, instead of informing the populace of genuine societal issues.

==== Other shootings ====
The controversy connecting the band and school shootings continued on October 10, 2007, following the SuccessTech Academy shooting. After being punched in the face by another student while exiting a bathroom, Asa Coon shot his attacker – Michael Peek – in the abdomen. Armed with two revolvers, he then proceeded down a hallway, where he wounded another student and two teachers by firing into two occupied classrooms, before entering a nearby bathroom and committing suicide. Coon was wearing a black Marilyn Manson T-shirt during the incident.

On May 18, 2009, 15-year-old Justin Doucet, a student at Larose Middle School in Lafourche Parish, Louisiana, entered the school armed with a .25-caliber Automatic Colt Pistol. When seventh-grade teacher Jessica Plaisance refused to comply with Doucet's demand to say "Hail Marilyn Manson", he fired two shots, narrowly missing her head, before turning the gun on himself. He died from his injuries a week later.

== Band members ==
Current members

- Marilyn Manson – lead vocals, rhythm guitar, keyboards, programming, tambourine, saxophone, pan flute (1989–present)
- Gil Sharone – drums (2014–2019; 2024–present)
- Piggy D. – rhythm guitar (2026–present); bass (2024–2026); backing vocals (2024–present)
- Tim Skold – bass, guitars, keyboards, backing vocals (2002–2008; 2026–present)
- Nick Annis – lead guitar, backing vocals, Novation Launchpad (2026–present)

Former members

- Daisy Berkowitz – lead guitar, programming, percussion, harmonica (1989–1996; died 2017)
- Olivia Newton Bundy – bass (1989–1990)
- Zsa Zsa Speck – keyboards (1990)
- Madonna Wayne Gacy – keyboards, synthesizers, programming, samples, percussion, brass instruments (1990–2007)
- Gidget Gein – bass (1990–1993; died 2008)
- Sara Lee Lucas – drums, programming (1991–1995)
- Twiggy Ramirez – bass, guitars, keyboards, backing vocals (1993–2002, 2008–2014; touring 2014–2017)
- Ginger Fish – drums, programming (1995–2011)
- Zim Zum – lead guitar, keyboards (1996–1998)
- John 5 – lead guitar, keyboards (1998–2004)
- Chris Vrenna – keyboards, synthesizers, programming, samples (2007–2011); drums (2011; touring 2004–2005)
- Fred Sablan – bass, guitars (2010–2014)
- Tyler Bates – lead guitar, bass, keyboards, backing vocals (2014–2015, 2015–2018, 2024–2026)
- Paul Wiley – rhythm guitar, lead guitar, programming, backing vocals (2018–2020; touring 2014–2018)
- Juan Alderete – bass, backing vocals (2018–2020; touring 2017–2018)
- Brandon Pertzborn – drums (2019–2020)

Former touring members

- Mark Chaussee – lead guitar (2004–2005)
- Rob Holliday – lead guitar (2008); bass (2007–2008); backing vocals (2007–2008)
- Wes Borland – lead guitar (2008–2009)
- Andy Gerold – bass (2009)
- Jason Sutter – drums (2012–2013)
- Spencer Rollins – keyboards, guitars (2013)
- Daniel Fox – keyboards, percussion (2015–2017)
- Reba Meyers – lead guitar, backing vocals (2024–2026)

== Discography ==
- Portrait of an American Family (1994)
- Antichrist Superstar (1996)
- Mechanical Animals (1998)
- Holy Wood (In the Shadow of the Valley of Death) (2000)
- The Golden Age of Grotesque (2003)
- Eat Me, Drink Me (2007)
- The High End of Low (2009)
- Born Villain (2012)
- The Pale Emperor (2015)
- Heaven Upside Down (2017)
- We Are Chaos (2020)
- One Assassination Under God – Chapter 1 (2024)
- One Assassination Under God – Chapter 2 (2026)

== Tours ==
- Portrait of an American Family Tour (1994–95)
- Smells Like Children Tour (1995–96)
- Dead to the World Tour (1996–97)
- Mechanical Animals Tour (1998–99)
- Beautiful Monsters Tour (co-headlining tour with Hole) (1999)
- Rock Is Dead Tour (1999)
- Guns, God and Government Tour (2000–01)
- Grotesk Burlesk Tour (2003–04)
- Against All Gods Tour (2004–05)
- Rape of the World Tour (2007–08)
- The High End of Low Tour (2009)
- Hey Cruel World... Tour (2012–13)
- Twins of Evil Tour (co-headlining tour with Rob Zombie) (2012)
- Masters of Madness Tour (co-headlining tour with Alice Cooper) (2013)
- The Hell Not Hallelujah Tour (2015–16)
- The End Times Tour (co-headlining tour with The Smashing Pumpkins) (2015)
- Heaven Upside Down Tour (2017–19)
- Twins of Evil: The Second Coming Tour (co-headlining tour with Rob Zombie) (2018)
- Twins of Evil: Hell Never Dies Tour (co-headlining tour with Rob Zombie) (2019)
- One Assassination Under God Tour (2024–26)
- Freaks on Parade Tour (co-headlining tour with Rob Zombie) (2026)

== Awards and nominations ==
Grammy Awards

| Year | Nominee / work | Award | Result | Ref. |
|---|---|---|---|---|
| 1999 | "The Dope Show" | Best Hard Rock Performance | Nominated | |
| 2001 | "Astonishing Panorama of the Endtimes" | Best Metal Performance | Nominated | |
| 2004 | "mOBSCENE" | Best Metal Performance | Nominated | |
| 2013 | "No Reflection" | Best Hard Rock/Metal Performance | Nominated | |

== Bibliography ==
- Baddeley, Gavin (2000). Dissecting Marilyn Manson. Plexus. ISBN 0859652831.
- Manson, Marilyn; Strauss, Neil (1998). The Long Hard Road Out of Hell. HarperCollins. ISBN 978-0-06-098746-6.
- Jones, Steve (2002). Jones, Steve (ed.). Pop music and the press. Philadelphia: Temple University Press. ISBN 978-1-56639-966-1.
