= Twins of Evil: Hell Never Dies Tour =

2019 concert tour by Rob Zombie and Marilyn Manson

- Tour by Rob Zombie and Marilyn Manson
- Start date: July 9, 2019
- End date: August 18, 2019
- Legs: 1
- No. of shows: 29

Rob Zombie and Marilyn Manson concert chronology
- Twins of Evil: The Second Coming Tour (2018); Twins of Evil: Hell Never Dies Tour (2019); Freaks on Parade Tour (2026)
Marilyn Manson tour chronology
- Twins of Evil: The Second Coming Tour
- (2018)
- Twins of Evil: Hell Never Dies Tour
- (2019)
- Marilyn Manson 2019 Tour
- (2019)

Twins of Evil: Hell Never Dies Tour was the third double bill concert tour co-headlined by American rock bands Rob Zombie and Marilyn Manson. The tour was staged by concert promoter LiveNation, following the critical and commercial success of the Twins of Evil franchise, from July 9, 2019, until August 18, 2019, and included stops at the Rock USA and Rock Fest concert festivals in mid-July. It covered 29 dates throughout North America, including seven shows in Canada, and lasted for six weeks.

The tour was a sequel to the "Twins of Evil Tour" (2012) and the "Twins of Evil: The Second Coming Tour" (2018) and visited amphitheaters and indoor arenas. It was also staged to generate anticipation for the follow-up LPs to Manson's tenth studio album Heaven Upside Down (2017) and Zombie's sixth solo album The Electric Warlock Acid Witch Satanic Orgy Celebration Dispenser (2016). Both bands were in varying stages of writing and recording their respective follow-up LPs during this tour. Zombie was also in post-production for his 2019 film 3 from Hell.

== Background ==
[The Twins of Evil makes a] big rock show feel like not only the right place to be, but also the best.

— Billboard magazine

Following the critical and box office success of 2012's "Twins of Evil Tour" and 2018's "Twins of Evil: The Second Coming Tour", as well as the positive reception to both group's joint cover of The Beatles song "Helter Skelter", concert producer LiveNation conceived of a third joint outing for both bands. Despite coinciding with the writing and recording sessions for the follow up LPs to The Electric Warlock Acid Witch Satanic Orgy Celebration Dispenser and Heaven Upside Down by Rob Zombie and Marilyn Manson, respectively, both bands announced the tour on their social media feeds on February 18, 2019. (Note: "On my way to @shooterjennings to finish my new album." —Marilyn Manson, Instagram.) Zombie was also working on post-production for his 2019 film 3 from Hell during this time.

The tour ran for six weeks, starting on July 9, 2019, at the Royal Farms Arena in Baltimore, Maryland until its conclusion on August 18, 2019, at the Bank of New Hampshire Pavilion in Gilford, New Hampshire. The tour joined the Rock USA and Rock Fest concert festivals in mid-July. Artist presales started on February 20, 2019. Blabbermouth.net held their own presales the following day. General sales commenced on February 22, 2019. VIP attendees were offered five premium packages which included perks such as an autographed Epiphone guitar and a meet and greet with both artists.

== Line-up ==
Line-up
Role	Artist
Co-headlining	Rob Zombie
Co-headlining	Marilyn Manson

Marilyn Manson

- Marilyn Manson – lead vocals, rhythm guitar
- Paul Wiley – lead guitar, backing vocals
- Juan Alderete – bass, backing vocals
- Brandon Pertzborn – drums

Rob Zombie

- Rob Zombie – lead vocals
- John 5 – guitars, backing vocals
- Piggy D. – bass, backing vocals
- Ginger Fish – drums

== Tour dates ==
† denotes a music festival where both Marilyn Manson and Rob Zombie performed.
‡ denotes a show performed by Marilyn Manson and Palaye Royale without Rob Zombie.

List of concerts, showing date, city, country, venue, opening acts and notes
Date	City	Country	Venue	Opening act	Note
North America
July 9, 2019	Baltimore	United States	Royal Farms Arena	Palaye Royale	
July 10, 2019	Allentown	United States	PPL Center	Palaye Royale	
July 12, 2019	Huntington	United States	Big Sandy Superstore Arena	Palaye Royale	
July 13, 2019	Cincinnati	United States	Riverbend Music Center	Palaye Royale	
July 14, 2019	Evansville	United States	Ford Center	Palaye Royale	
July 16, 2019	Rockford	United States	BMO Harris Bank Center	Palaye Royale	
July 17, 2019	Bonner Springs	United States	Providence Medical Center Amphitheater	Palaye Royale	
July 19, 2019 (Note: Rock USA)	Oshkosh	United States	Ford Festival Park	Palaye Royale	†
July 20, 2019 (Note: Rock Fest)	Cadott	United States	Chippewa Valley Music Festival Grounds	none	†
July 21, 2019	Council Bluffs	United States	Westfair Amphitheatre	Palaye Royale	
July 23, 2019	Sioux Falls	United States	Denny Sanford Premier Center	Palaye Royale	
July 24, 2019	Bismarck	United States	Bismarck Event Center	Palaye Royale	
July 25, 2019	Billings	United States	Rimrock Auto Arena	Palaye Royale	
July 27, 2019 (Note: Chaos AB Festival)	Edmonton	Canada	Kinsmen Park	Palaye Royale	
July 30, 2019	Missoula	United States	Big Sky Brewing Company	Palaye Royale	‡
July 31, 2019	Boise	United States	Knitting Factory	Palaye Royale	‡
August 2, 2019	Portland	United States	Moda Center	Palaye Royale	
August 3, 2019	Auburn	United States	White River Amphitheatre	Palaye Royale	
August 4, 2019	Vancouver	Canada	Rogers Arena	Palaye Royale	
August 6, 2019	Saskatoon	Canada	SaskTel Centre	Palaye Royale	
August 7, 2019	Winnipeg	Canada	Bell MTS Place	Palaye Royale	
August 9, 2019	Fargo	United States	Fargodome	Palaye Royale	
August 10, 2019	Cedar Rapids	United States	U.S. Cellular Center	Palaye Royale	
August 11, 2019	Fort Wayne	United States	Allen County War Memorial Coliseum	Palaye Royale	
August 13, 2019	Grand Rapids	United States	Van Andel Arena	Palaye Royale	
August 14, 2019	London	Canada	Budweiser Gardens	Palaye Royale	
August 16, 2019	Ottawa	Canada	Canadian Tire Centre	Palaye Royale	
August 17, 2019	Quebec	Canada	Videotron Centre	Palaye Royale	
August 18, 2019	Gilford	United States	Bank of New Hampshire Pavilion	Palaye Royale	

== Box office data ==
List of box scores, showing date, city, venue, tickets sold compared to the number of available tickets and amount of gross revenue
Date	City	Venue	Attendance	Revenue	Ref.
August 2, 2019	Portland	Moda Center	11,232	$666,725	
