= EP 2000 =

EP by GrimSkunk
- Released: 2000
- Genre: Hard rock
- Length: 11:34
- Label: Indica Records (Canada)

Ep 2000 is the second EP by Canadian rock group GrimSkunk released in 2000. Tracks 1 and 4 would later appear on the album Seventh Wave.

== Track listing ==
1. Check-moé ben aller (Bring Me Down)
2. Misfit
3. Right On (Rock 'n' Roll Dream)
4. My Girlfriend
