= Shyne Factory =

Canadian musical group

- Origin: Halifax, Nova Scotia, Canada
- Genres: Progressive rock Alternative rock
- Years active: 1992–2004
- Labels: EMI Canada; Red Liquorice; Release Records; No Records
- Members: Shawn Scott; Mike Johnson; Matt Johnson

Shyne Factory was a Canadian progressive rock and power pop band from Halifax, Nova Scotia.

== History ==
Shyne Factory was formed in 1992 in by Shawn Scott and twin brothers Mike and Matt Johnson. After releasing two EPs in 1994 and 1995, the band recorded it first full-length album of power pop music, Candy Coated, in 1997.

In 2000, the band was nominated for an East Coast Music Award. That year, the band's self-produced video, "I'm Not Sorry", was played regularly on MuchMusic.

The band continued to perform in eastern Canada, including an appearance at the Snow Jam festival in Halifax in 2001. An album, Hell or High Water, was released in 2003, and toured across Canada in support, including a stop in Montreal.

By 2004, Shyne Factory had disbanded.

== Discography ==
=== EPs ===
- 1994: Canvas (Release Records)
- 1995: Pop Art (Release Records)

=== Albums ===
- 1997: Candy Coated (No Records)
- 1999: Lava (Red Liquorice)
- 2003: Hell or High Water (EMI Canada)

=== Singles ===
- 2000: "Bring Me Down"
- 2003: "The Moment"
- 2003: "Losing Out"
