= Deadly Apples =

Canadian musical group

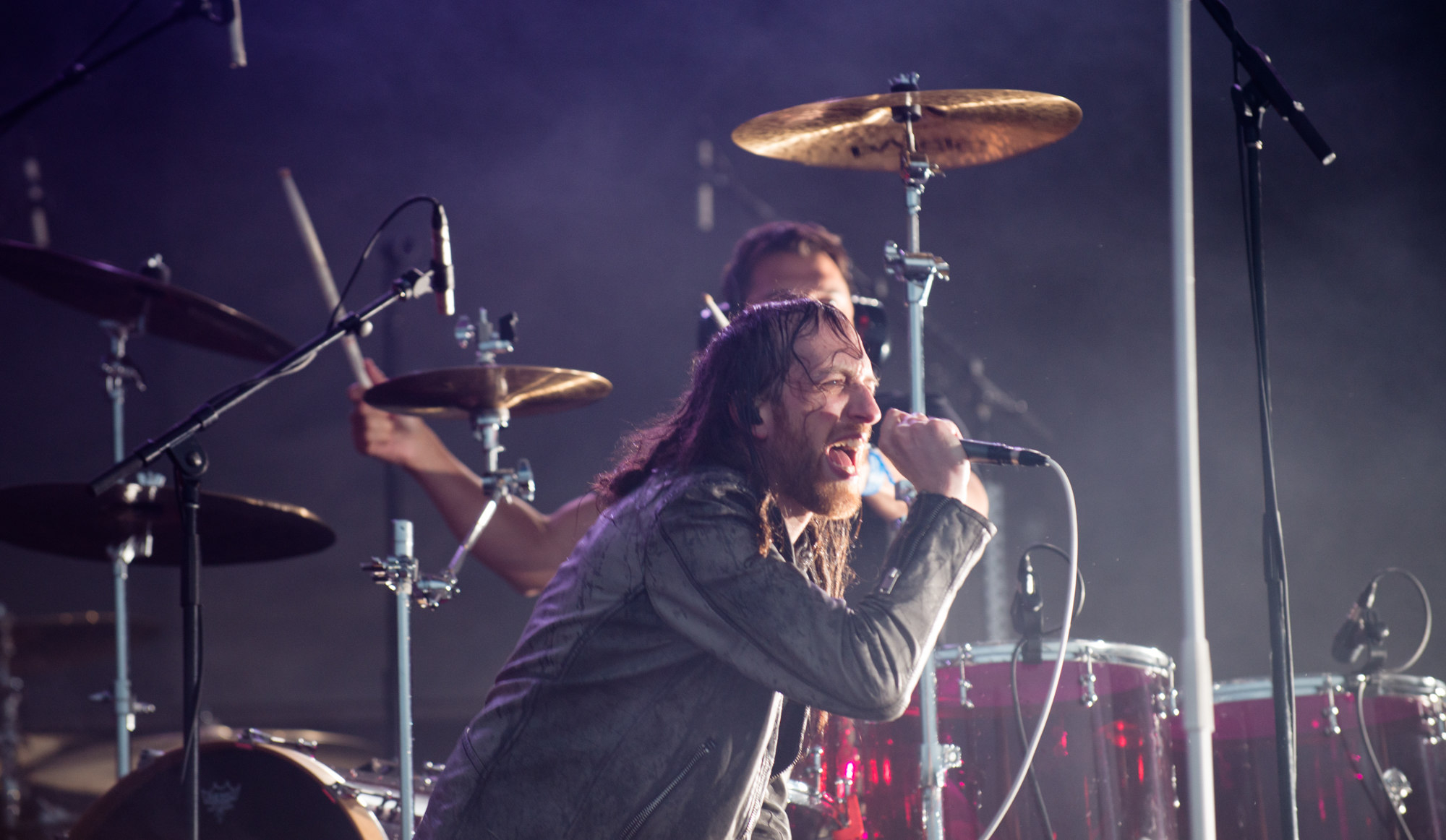
- Deadly Apples live, 2018

Background information
- Origin: Montreal, Quebec, Canada
- Genres: Rock, electronic rock, alternative metal, industrial metal, trap metal
- Website: deadlyapples.com

Deadly Apples is a Canadian rock / industrial metal band based in Montreal, Quebec. The band consists of frontman / lyricist Alex Martel (vocals) and songwriter / producer Antoine Lamothe (drums, synths), with live musicians joining them on stage. The band is known for its high energy and intense live performances.

== History ==
Originally founded by singer Alex Martel while in high school, the project went through different lineups and iterations before being joined by drummer Antoine Lamothe.

In 2008, the band released the Infected EP on streaming platforms. Paul Barker, formerly of Ministry, remixed the song "Self Inflicted Oppression" with samples from Ministry's "Psalm 69". The remix was featured on the soundtrack for the documentary film Fix: The Ministry Movie. In 2017, the band released the Petty EP which was mixed by Vance Powell, mastered by Bob Ludwig and featuring Munky from Korn as guest guitarist on the songs "Further" and "Help".

The band supported Rammstein in Canada and released a music video for "Further" directed by Tony. More shows were announced for 2017, including festival slots at Knotfest and Fronterizo Fest, as well as support dates for Deftones in Mexico.

In February 2018, the band sold out the National club in Montreal. In March 2018, they toured Japan with Korn and performed at the Vans Warped Tour in Tokyo. In April and May, the band played several festivals in Mexico and South America including Hell & Heaven Fest, Fronterizo Fest, and Vivo X El Rock, as well as several support dates with Deftones and Front 242. In June 2018, the band played its largest hometown show to 20,000 fans on the opening night of Montebello Rockfest, as well as Machaca Festival in Mexico.

In July and August, Deadly Apples toured arenas and amphitheaters for two months with Marilyn Manson and Rob Zombie on the US Twins of Evil Tour, as well as solo Marilyn Manson dates. The song "None of Them" from the Petty album was remixed by Chris Lord-Alge.

During summer 2019, they performed on the Vans Warped Tour. In October and November of 2019, they toured the US with Marilyn Manson and announced performances at South American festivals in late November with Slipknot. In March 2020, the band performed two days in a row at Mexico's Hell and Heaven Fest, which turned out to be the last festival in the world that was not canceled by the COVID-19 pandemic.

In June 2022, after being postponed for two years because of the pandemic, the band went on its first European tour playing major festivals like Copenhell, Rock For People, Hellfest, VOA Heavy Rock and Resurrection fest, as well as arena dates with Korn. In December 2022, Deadly Apples returned to Mexico's Hell and Heaven Fest. The band played the Tattoo Music Fest in Colombia in May 2023, followed by a US tour in support of Filter during the summer of 2023.

Work on a new album started during the pandemic with pre-production handled by Michael Beinhorn. In 2023, the band started recording the new album Distress at the Mix Room in Burbank, California. It was produced by Lamothe, mixed by Ben Grosse, mastered by Tom Baker, and featured Danny Lohner of Nine Inch Nails handling guitars and bass. Richard Patrick of Filter contributed guest vocals on singles "Volatile" and ''Sacrifice'', which were released in 2025. The music video for ''Volatile'' was selected for the Silver Screenings at the Berlin Music Video Awards.

In the Spring of 2025, the band returned to South America for a Main Stage performance at Vivo x el rock in Peru with Marilyn Manson and Avenged Sevenfold. In May 2025, the band returned to the US to perform at Welcome to Rockville in Florida, as well as dates with Filter and The Union Underground. In the Summer of 2026, the band performed its first homecoming Quebec shows in nearly 7 years at Festival au Lac in Granby with Jinjer and Festivoix in Trois-Rivières with Papa Roach and Angine de Poitrine.

== Band members ==
- Alex Martel - vocals
- Antoine Lamothe - drums, keyboards
