= Sacrilegious (song) =

2024 song by Marilyn Manson

Single by Marilyn Manson

from the album One Assassination Under God – Chapter 1
- Released: September 27, 2024
- Genre: Pop metal; industrial pop; glam rock; gothic rock
- Length: 3:35
- Label: Nuclear Blast
- Songwriters: Marilyn Manson; Tyler Bates
- Producers: Manson; Bates

Marilyn Manson singles chronology
"Raise the Red Flag" (2024)	"Sacrilegious" (2024)	"In The Air Tonight" (2025)

Music video
- "Sacrilegious" on YouTube

"Sacrilegious" is a song by American rock band Marilyn Manson. It was released as the third single from their twelfth studio album, One Assassination Under God – Chapter 1, on November 22, 2024, via Nuclear Blast. The track was written and produced by Marilyn Manson alongside Tyler Bates, with drums performed by Gil Sharone. The song's music video was directed by Bill Yukich, who also directed the videos for the previous two singles, "As Sick as the Secrets Within" and "Raise the Red Flag". The track peaked within the top ten of Billboard's Hard Rock Digital Song Sales, making it the band's twelfth top ten hit on that chart.

== Composition and style ==
"Sacrilegious" was written and produced by Marilyn Manson and Tyler Bates. The song's lyric examines a perceived hypocrisy of religion, where the death of the savior is glorified. The lyric instead argues: "You should have treated your saviors better." Revolver noted the lyric references numerous aspects of Christian theology, including martyrdom and resurrection, which their writer said can be analogous to cancel culture. It is one of the more uptempo tracks on One Assassination Under God – Chapter 1, and was described in reviews as a pop metal, industrial pop, glam rock and gothic rock song, with elements of industrial and alternative rock. Manson's vocals were described as featuring a "mix of aggression and melody."

Sputnikmusic said the songs builds upon the material Manson and Bates created together on The Pale Emperor (2015) and Heaven Upside Down (2017), but that the song's "sinister vocal croons and creepy industrial electronics hearken back to [Manson's 1990s] heyday". Similarly, KNAC said the song contains "nods to the rage and theatricality of Antichrist Superstar", specifically the song "Mister Superstar", but said "Sacrilegious" was more "restrained" than "Mister Superstar", saying it was "woven into [the] larger narrative [of One Assassination Under God – Chapter 1] rather than taking center stage."

Numerous reviews compared "Sacrilegious" to the Antichrist Superstar single "The Beautiful People". Sonic Abuse said the song contained a similar "rhythm and death-groove swing". They said it "feels like the track was written as a single", but said a single was unnecessary considering the abuse allegations, arguing Manson's time was better spent making harder and more introspective material. However, they went on to say that "no one quite does sleazy industro-pop like Manson, and it's easy to imagine his fans lapping [the song] up." Greg Burk of Metal Jazz called it the album's "obligatory 'Beautiful People' redux". In their album review, Blabbermouth.net singled out "Sacrilegious" as one of the weaker songs on the record, saying the track is "no 'Beautiful People' or 'Disposable Teens' but plainly wants to be".

== Release and promotion ==
A three-track digital single was released on September 27, 2024, by Nuclear Blast. The single contained "As Sick as the Secrets Within" and "Raise the Red Flag" as B-sides. The same day, the track listing, cover art and release date of parent album One Assassination Under God – Chapter 1 was revealed. The song's music video was also released on September 27, which was directed by Bill Yukich. He directed the music videos for "As Sick as the Secrets Within" and "Raise the Red Flag", as well as the music videos for three songs on the band's 2017 album Heaven Upside Down: "Kill4Me", "Say10", and "Tattooed in Reverse".

== Commercial performance ==
The song debuted within the top ten of Billboard's Hard Rock Digital Song Sales. It was the band's fifteenth song to enter the chart, and their twelfth to peak within the top ten.

== Track listing ==
All songs written and produced by Marilyn Manson and Tyler Bates.

1. "Sacrilegious" – 3:35
2. "Raise the Red Flag" – 4:49
3. "As Sick as the Secrets Within" – 5:35

== Credits and personnel ==
Credits adapted from the liner notes of One Assassination Under God – Chapter 1.

- Tyler Bates – composition, guitars, bass, keyboards, recording and production
- Will Borza – mastering
- Robert Carranza – recording and mixing
- Marilyn Manson – composition, vocals and production
- Gil Sharone – drums
- Howie Weinberg – mastering

== Charts ==
Chart performance for "Sacrilegious"
Chart (2024)	Peak position
US Hard Rock Digital Song Sales (Billboard)	10
