= One Assassination Under God =

Song by Marilyn Manson

from the album One Assassination Under God – Chapter 1
- Released: November 22, 2024
- Studio: The Abattoir, Los Angeles
- Genre: Gothic metal
- Length: 5:28
- Label: Nuclear Blast Records
- Songwriters: Marilyn Manson; Tyler Bates
- Producers: Manson; Bates

Music video
- "One Assassination Under God" on YouTube

"One Assassination Under God" is a song by American rock band Marilyn Manson. It is the first track on their twelfth studio album, One Assassination Under God – Chapter 1 (2024). The song was written and produced by Marilyn Manson and Tyler Bates, with drums performed by Gil Sharone. The track was not released as a single, but its music video was released on November 22, 2024, the same day as the album. Bill Yukich directed the music video, who also directed the videos for the album's three singles: "As Sick as the Secrets Within", "Raise the Red Flag" and "Sacrilegious".

The song was inspired by a collection of paintings the vocalist had assembled, notably paintings by Michelangelo Caravaggio, which depicted beheadings, executions, quarterings, and firing squads. He interpreted these works as being "less about justice" and "more about the desire to see blood and to see suffering." Music journalists described the song as goth metal, and said the track finds Manson examining the media's reaction to the abuse allegations levelled against him.

The song received positive reviews upon release, with numerous critics praising Manson's vocals and the instrumentation, with one review also describing it as one of the most affecting songs of the band's discography.

== Composition and style ==
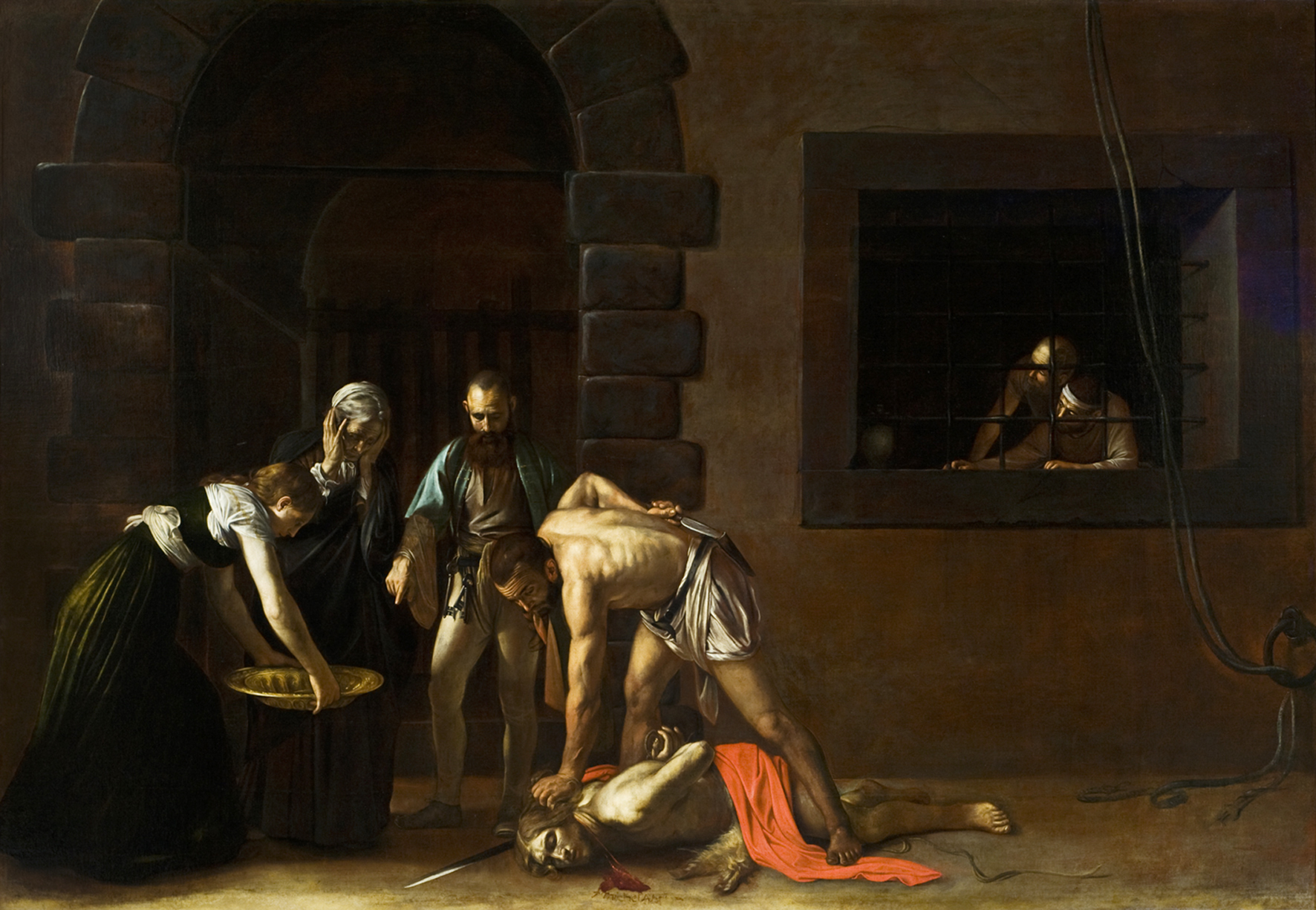
The Beheading of Saint John the Baptist, c. 1608, by Caravaggio; numerous such works served as inspiration for the song's lyrical content. Manson interpreted these as the desire of a crowd to observe suffering.

"One Assassination Under God" was written and produced by Marilyn Manson and Tyler Bates, with drums performed by Gil Sharone. The song was recorded at Bates's The Abattoir recording studio in Los Angeles sometime between April 2023 and April 2024. It is the first track on One Assassination Under God – Chapter 1, released by Nuclear Blast Records.

Manson described the song as the obvious beginning of the story he would tell on both One Assassination Under God albums. Its lyrical content was inspired by a collection of paintings he had assembled, notably paintings by Michelangelo Caravaggio and others "of that era depicting various types of beheadings, executions of all sorts, firing squads. There was one illustration I saw where a horse was tied to each limb of the person they were killing and it ripped the person apart when the horses were set free. There was another one in which a person was sewn into a live animal and then it was set free to run off of a cliff." He said that when looking at these images, he noticed a repeating pattern: "It seemed to me that it was less about justice for the crowds of people involved in these things. It was more about the desire to see blood and to see suffering."

The lyric of the track finds the vocalist discussing the media's reaction to the abuse allegations made against him, with Sputnikmusic saying Manson compares "his recent infamy [to] a lynching and used as entertainment for the masses". Similarly, Sonic Abuse said the song "appears to address Manson's troubled past head on." Manson said that in his conversations with Bates about the song's production, he knew he wanted the song to be "dramatic, cinematic and military at times. And then when we got to the chorus, I wanted it to be a very melancholy release, so that it was able to capture all the emotions that I was feeling." He said that the ending of the track, "where I scream the word 'assassination', I think it was probably one of the most defining and important moments in my entire musical career. When I listen to it now I still get chills and when I perform it live also, it really gives me a lot of complicated emotions along with it."

Musically, New Transcendence described the song as a "slow-burning, industrial-infused anthem". Blabbermouth.net called the song a "slow-slung goth metal grinder", saying the song "aches with melancholy and bitterness, jagged metal riffs underpinning Manson's grim diatribe, and a big, wall-of-guitars blowout towards the end that is equal parts lush and lacerating." Sonic Abuse said the "mid-paced drums and synth embellishments" found on the first section of the track gradually retreat to "reveal the tightly wound guitars and melodic vocals ... at the song's heart."

== Release and promotion ==
The song was not released as a single, but a music video for the track was released on November 22, 2024, the same day the parent album was released. The music video was directed by Bill Yukich, who directed the music videos for every single released from One Assassination Under God – Chapter 1.

The video features Manson in several scenes taking place in and around a secluded farm house. Over the course of the video, he is seen sitting alone at a dining room table with a birthday cake and balloons, sitting inside of and standing in front of a black car, wearing black and holding a black umbrella in a rainstorm, sitting on a throne atop a large pile of burning wood, holding a noose tied around the neck of a goat. During the song's bridge, he is seen dragging a smoldering coffin baring the mark of the Cross of Lorraine.

== Critical reception ==
Sonic Abuse praised Manson's vocals, which they described as being among the best of his entire career, and said the song is "arguably one of the most affecting songs to which Manson has put his name". New Transcendence also praised Manson's vocals and the band's musicianship, saying Manson delivers his vocal with "a raw intensity" that was complimented by Bates's heavy guitar work and Sharone's "pounding" drums. Their writer said the song "builds to a cathartic climax", one that leaves a "lasting impression." Cryptic Rock also praised Manson's vocals and the production.

== Credits and personnel ==
Credits adapted from the liner notes of One Assassination Under God – Chapter 1.

- Tyler Bates – composition, guitars, bass, keyboards, recording and production
- Will Borza – mastering
- Robert Carranza – recording and mixing
- Marilyn Manson – composition, vocals and production
- Gil Sharone – drums
- Howie Weinberg – mastering
