= Heaven Upside Down Tour =

2017–18 concert tour by Marilyn Manson

- Tour by Marilyn Manson
- Promotional poster for the December 4 – December 9 UK performances of the Heaven Upside Down Tour
- Associated album: Heaven Upside Down
- Start date: July 20, 2017
- End date: December 31, 2018
- No. of shows: 68 in North America; 54 in Europe; 124 total

Marilyn Manson concert chronology
- The End Times Tour (2015–16); Heaven Upside Down Tour (2017–18) Twins of Evil: The Second Coming Tour (2018); Twins of Evil: Hell Never Dies Tour (2019)

The Heaven Upside Down Tour is the fifteenth concert tour by American rock band Marilyn Manson. It was launched in support of their tenth studio album, Heaven Upside Down, which was released on October 6, 2017. Beginning on July 20, 2017, the tour currently includes seven legs spanning Europe and North America, for a total of 124 shows.

The live band for the tour initially included Marilyn Manson on vocals, Twiggy on bass guitar, Tyler Bates on lead guitar, Paul Wiley on rhythm guitar, Gil Sharone on drums, and Daniel Fox on percussion and keyboards. Several of these musicians have left the band throughout the tour, however. Fox played his final show with the band on the July 31 date in Moscow, although he remains a member of the crew as Sharone's drum technician. Twiggy was dismissed from the band on October 25.

Bates also indicated he would not be performing on the second European leg, saying: "I want to play as many shows as I can, but I've got some pretty intense commitments with film coming up and that takes precedence. The great thing about my working relationship with Manson and how the band is set up is that they can accommodate me when I'm there, or reconfigure things when I'm not."

Their second co-headlining tour with Rob Zombie, the "Twins of Evil: The Second Coming Tour" (following the 2012 "Twins of Evil Tour"), began on July 11 in Detroit and consisted of nearly 30 dates spanning North America.

== Itinerary ==
The band debuted several songs during the first European leg of the tour, including new tracks from Heaven Upside Down, such as "Revelation #12", "We Know Where You Fucking Live" and "Say10", and "1°". However, the latter was subsequently revealed to be band jam based on their cover version of Eurythmics' "Sweet Dreams (Are Made of This)". The tour also encompassed several appearances by the band at music festivals, including an October 22 appearance at the Sacramento-based Aftershock Festival, at which Nine Inch Nails was also scheduled to appear. Manson indicated that he may join that band on-stage at the festival after he and Trent Reznor mended a longstanding feud. However, Marilyn Manson later pulled out of the festival due to injuries caused by a prop falling on the vocalist.

== Injuries ==
The entire band narrowly avoided injury in Moscow when their tour bus was involved in a collision with a semi-trailer truck. Bates recalled: "We had a real asshole driver who worked for the promoter, and he nearly got us killed on the way from the airport. At some point, we just bailed out of the vehicle, because [the driver] was being really weird and contentious, and tried to lock us inside." Additionally, the North American leg of the tour has seen the band's eponymous vocalist be injured several times while performing on-stage. During the encore performance of "The Beautiful People" on September 29 at Stage AE in Pittsburgh, Manson broke his ankle after jumping from the stage to sing with fans who were standing near the barricade. After the vocalist crawled back on-stage, the band abruptly abandoned the song. However, they resumed when Manson invited opener Alice Glass to take over on vocals. He had reportedly expressed safety concerns to his tour manager prior to the concert.

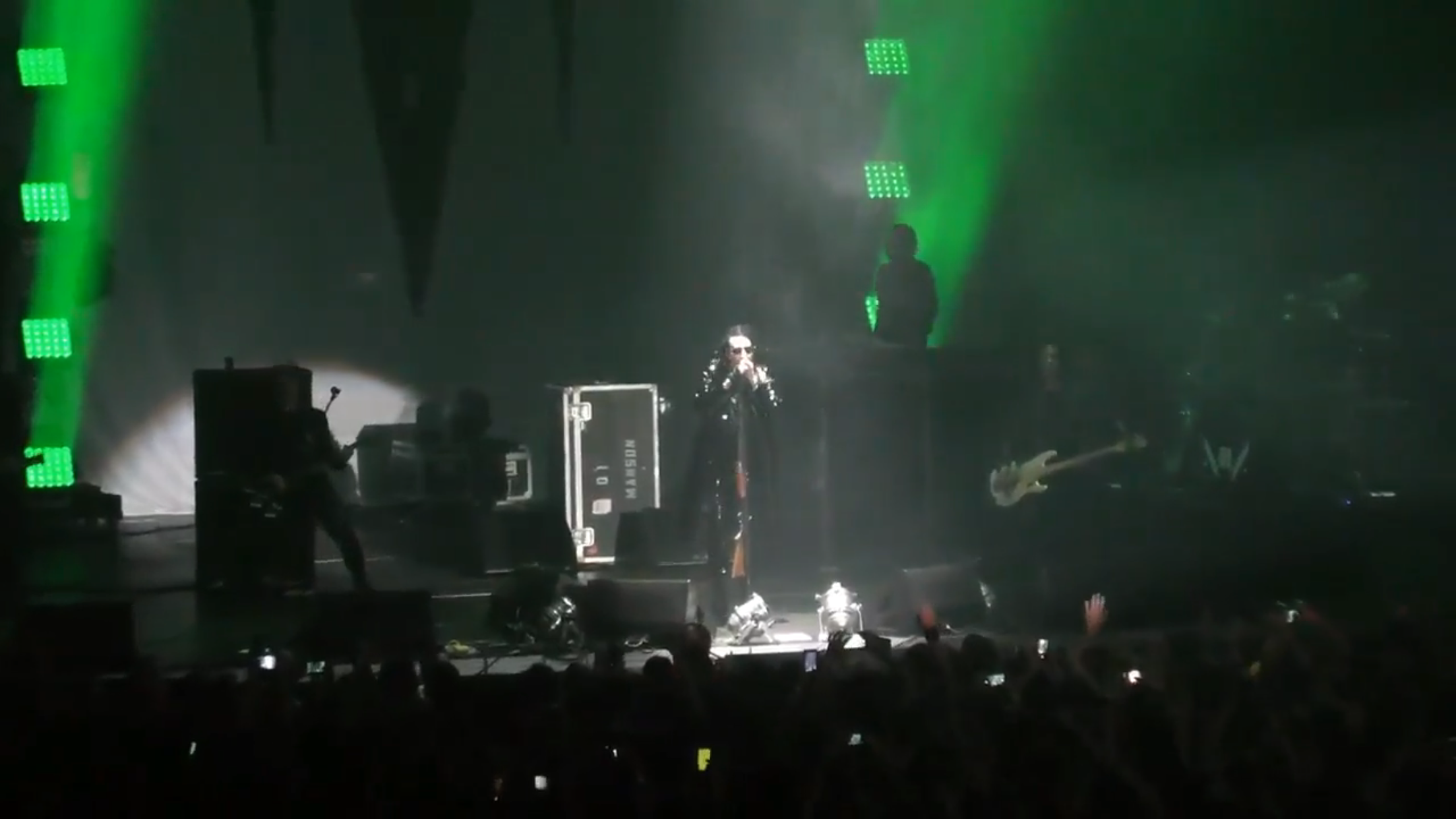
Marilyn Manson performing "We Know Where You Fucking Live"

The following night, at the Hammerstein Ballroom in New York City, a large 750 kg – approximately 1650lbs – stage prop consisting of two oversized pistols attached via metal scaffolding fell on the vocalist. According to Manson, the metal truss supporting the prop had not been securely fastened to the ground. He later explained: "I wasn't trying to climb it. It started to fall and I tried to push [it] back, [but] I didn't get out the way in time. I'm not sure what I hit my head on, but it did fall onto my leg". The incident happened while the band was performing their cover of "Sweet Dreams". Manson lay unconscious on the stage for up to 15 minutes before being carried out of the venue on a stretcher to a nearby hospital. The prop broke Manson's fibula in two places and required a plate and ten screws to be inserted into the bone to repair the damage. He also had a screw inserted into his ankle to repair the damage sustained during the Pittsburgh show. He was discharged from the hospital after several days and spent time recuperating at his home in Los Angeles.

The following nine dates of the North American leg were immediately cancelled, with the remaining October shows gradually cancelled over the next week. All of these shows – excluding festival appearances – were rescheduled for the beginning of 2018.

The European tour continued as planned with Marilyn Manson adapting his stage show and props to work with his recovery. A special chair was designed allowing him to sit and stand up with support, a hospital bed was used for other songs, other leg supports were also used to ensure he could stand on stage and perform as planned.

== Setlist ==
Marilyn Manson played a lot of songs during the tour. Most played songs are: "Disposable Teens", "The Beautiful People", "The Dope Show", "Sweet Dreams (Are Made of This)", "This Is the New Shit", "Mobscene", "Say10" and "Deep Six".

Songs played during Heaven Upside Down Tour / Twins of Evil: The Second Coming Tour
Album/EP	Song
Portrait of an American Family	"Lunchbox"
Portrait of an American Family	"Cake and Sodomy"
Portrait of an American Family	"Prelude (The Family Trip)"
Smells Like Children	"Sweet Dreams (Are Made of This)"
Smells Like Children	"Rock N Roll Nigger"
Antichrist Superstar	"Irresponsible Hate Anthem"
Antichrist Superstar	"The Beautiful People"
Antichrist Superstar	"Tourniquet"
Antichrist Superstar	"Angel with the Scabbed Wings"
Antichrist Superstar	"Antichrist Superstar"
Antichrist Superstar	"The Reflecting God"
Antichrist Superstar	"Dried Up, Tied and Dead to the World"
Mechanical Animals	"Great Big White World"
Mechanical Animals	"The Dope Show"
Mechanical Animals	"Rock Is Dead"
Mechanical Animals	"Coma White"
Holy Wood (In the Shadow of the Valley of Death)	"Disposable Teens"
Holy Wood (In the Shadow of the Valley of Death)	"The Fight Song"
Holy Wood (In the Shadow of the Valley of Death)	"Cruci-Fiction in Space"
Holy Wood (In the Shadow of the Valley of Death)	"The Nobodies"
Holy Wood (In the Shadow of the Valley of Death)	"The Love Song"
The Golden Age of Grotesque	"Mobscene"
The Golden Age of Grotesque	"This Is the New Shit"
The Golden Age of Grotesque	"Tainted Love"
Lest We Forget: The Best Of	"Personal Jesus"
Born Villain	"No Reflection"
The Pale Emperor	"Deep Six"
The Pale Emperor	"Third Day of a Seven Day Binge"
Heaven Upside Down	"Revelation #12"
Heaven Upside Down	"Tattooed in Reverse"
Heaven Upside Down	"We Know Where You Fucking Live"
Heaven Upside Down	"Say10"
Heaven Upside Down	"Kill4Me"
Heaven Upside Down	"Saturnalia"
Non-album songs	"Sick City" (Charles Manson cover)
Non-album songs	"Cry Little Sister" (The New Mutants OST)

== Shows ==
List of concerts, showing date, city, country, venue.
Date	City	Country	Venue	Attendance	Revenue
Europe
July 20, 2017	Budapest	Hungary	Budapest Park	—N/a	—N/a
July 21, 2017	Katowice	Poland	Metal Hammer Festival	—N/a	—N/a
July 22, 2017	Dresden	Germany	Woodstage Open Air	—N/a	—N/a
July 24, 2017	Tolmin	Slovenia	Metaldays	—N/a	—N/a
July 25, 2017	Rome	Italy	Rock in Roma	—N/a	—N/a
July 26, 2017	Verona	Italy	Villafranca di Verona	—N/a	—N/a
July 28, 2017	Oulu	Finland	Qstock	—N/a	—N/a
July 31, 2017	Moscow	Russia	Stadium Live	—N/a	—N/a
August 2, 2017	Kyiv	Ukraine	Sport Palace	—N/a	—N/a
August 4, 2017	Wacken	Germany	Wacken Open Air	—N/a	—N/a
August 5, 2017	Utrecht	Netherlands	TivoliVredenburg	—N/a	—N/a
August 6, 2017	Lokeren	Belgium	Lokerse Festival	—N/a	—N/a
August 10, 2017	Avenches	Switzerland	Rock Oz'Arènes	—N/a	—N/a
August 12, 2017	Landerneau	France	Fêtes du Bruit	—N/a	—N/a
North America
September 27, 2017	Silver Spring	United States	The Filmore	—N/a	—N/a
September 29, 2017	Pittsburgh	United States	Stage AE	3,969 / 4,500	$189,328
September 30, 2017	New York City	United States	Hammerstein Ballroom	—N/a	—N/a
November 5, 2017	San Bernardino	United States	Ozzfest Meets Knotfest	—N/a	—N/a
Europe
November 12, 2017	Helsinki	Finland	Jäähalli	—N/a	—N/a
November 14, 2017	Stockholm	Sweden	Annexet	—N/a	—N/a
November 15, 2017	Helsingør	Denmark	Hal 14	—N/a	—N/a
November 16, 2017	Hamburg	Germany	Sporthalle	—N/a	—N/a
November 18, 2017	Munich	Germany	Zenith	—N/a	—N/a
November 19, 2017	Prague	Czech Republic	Tip Sport Arena	—N/a	—N/a
November 20, 2017	Vienna	Austria	Gasometer	—N/a	—N/a
November 22, 2017	Turin	Italy	Pala Alpitour	—N/a	—N/a
November 23, 2017	Zürich	Switzerland	Samsung Hall	—N/a	—N/a
November 25, 2017	Berlin	Germany	Velodrom	—N/a	—N/a
November 27, 2017	Paris	France	AccorHotels Arena	—N/a	—N/a
November 28, 2017	Eindhoven	Netherlands	Klokgebouw	—N/a	—N/a
November 29, 2017	Düsseldorf	Germany	Mitsubishi Electric Halle	—N/a	—N/a
December 1, 2017	Nancy	France	Zénith de Nancy	—N/a	—N/a
December 2, 2017	Brussels	Belgium	Forest National	—N/a	—N/a
December 4, 2017	Manchester	United Kingdom	O2 Apollo Manchester	—N/a	—N/a
December 5, 2017	Glasgow	United Kingdom	O2 Academy Glasgow	—N/a	—N/a
December 6, 2017	Wolverhampton	United Kingdom	Wolverhampton Civic Hall	—N/a	—N/a
December 8, 2017	Newport	United Kingdom	Newport Centre	—N/a	—N/a
December 9, 2017	London	United Kingdom	Wembley Arena	11,210 / 12,500	$523,172
North America
January 10, 2018	Phoenix	United States	Van Buren Theatre	—N/a	—N/a
January 12, 2018	Las Vegas	United States	House of Blues	—N/a	—N/a
January 13, 2018	Las Vegas	United States	House of Blues	—N/a	—N/a
January 15, 2018	Los Angeles	United States	Hollywood Palladium	—N/a	—N/a
January 16, 2018	Oakland	United States	Fox Oakland Theatre	2,828 / 2,828	$180,153
January 19, 2018	Salt Lake City	United States	The Complex	—N/a	—N/a
January 20, 2018	Denver	United States	The Fillmore	3,600 / 3,859	$168,568
January 23, 2018	San Antonio	United States	Aztec Theatre	—N/a	—N/a
January 24, 2018	Houston	United States	House of Blues	—N/a	—N/a
January 26, 2018	Springfield	United States	Shrine Mosque	—N/a	—N/a
January 27, 2018	Tulsa	United States	Brady Theater	—N/a	—N/a
January 28, 2018	Kansas City	United States	Midland Theatre	—N/a	—N/a
January 30, 2018	Des Moines	United States	Seven Flags Event Center	—N/a	—N/a
January 31, 2018	Minneapolis	United States	The Myth	3,074 / 3,300	$149,244
February 2, 2018	Madison	United States	The Orpheum	1,860 / 2,299	$98,162
February 3, 2018	Milwaukee	United States	Eagles Ballroom	—N/a	—N/a
February 6, 2018	Chicago	United States	Riviera Theatre	2,540 / 2,540	$147,320
February 7, 2018	Grand Rapids	United States	Twenty Monroe	—N/a	—N/a
February 9, 2018	Buffalo	United States	Rapids Theatre	—N/a	—N/a
February 11, 2018	Toronto	Canada	Rebel	—N/a	—N/a
February 12, 2018	Boston	United States	House of Blues	2,425 / 2,425	$159,405
February 13, 2018	Baltimore	United States	Rams Head Live!	—N/a	—N/a
February 15, 2018	Huntington	United States	Paramount Theatre	1,573 / 1,573	$131,673
February 16, 2018	Sayreville	United States	Starland Ballroom	1,998 / 1,998	$119,381
May 5, 2018	Mexico City	Mexico	Hell & Heaven Metal Fest	—N/a	—N/a
Europe
May 30, 2018	Haarlem	Netherlands	Philharmonium	—N/a	—N/a
June 1, 2018	Nürburg	Germany	Rock am Ring	—N/a	—N/a
June 3, 2018	Nuremberg	Germany	Rock im Park	—N/a	—N/a
June 4, 2018	Aarhus	Denmark	SCC	—N/a	—N/a
June 5, 2018	Oslo	Norway	Sentrum Scene	—N/a	—N/a
June 6, 2018	Stockholm	Sweden	Gröna Lund	—N/a	—N/a
June 8, 2018	Hyvinkää	Finland	Rock Fest	—N/a	—N/a
June 10, 2018	Donington Park	United Kingdom	Download Festival	—N/a	—N/a
June 12, 2018	Dresden	Germany	Junge Garde	—N/a	—N/a
June 13, 2018	Warsaw	Poland	Torwar Hall	—N/a	—N/a
June 14, 2018	Nickelsdorf	Austria	Nova Rock Festival	—N/a	—N/a
June 16, 2018	Brétigny-sur-Orge	France	Download Festival	—N/a	—N/a
June 19, 2018	Milan	Italy	Ippodromo San Siro	—N/a	—N/a
June 20, 2018	Nîmes	France	Festival de Nîmes	—N/a	—N/a
June 21, 2018	Dijon	France	Le Zénith	—N/a	—N/a
June 23, 2018	Dessel	Belgium	Graspop Festival	—N/a	—N/a
June 24, 2018	Clisson	France	Hellfest	—N/a	—N/a
June 27, 2018	Lisbon	Portugal	Campo Pequeno	—N/a	—N/a
June 28, 2018	Madrid	Spain	Download Festival	—N/a	—N/a
June 29, 2018	Marmande	France	Garorock Festival	—N/a	—N/a
North America: Twins of Evil: The Second Coming Tour (with Rob Zombie)
July 11, 2018	Detroit	United States	DTE Energy Music Center	—N/a	—N/a
July 14, 2018	St. Louis	United States	Hollywood Casino Amphitheatre	—N/a	—N/a
July 15, 2018	Chicago	United States	Hollywood Casino Amphitheatre	—N/a	—N/a
July 17, 2018	Cuyahoga Falls	United States	Blossom Music Center	—N/a	—N/a
July 18, 2018	Noblesville	United States	Ruoff Home Mortgage Music Center	—N/a	—N/a
July 20, 2018	Virginia Beach	United States	Veterans United Home Loans Amphitheater	—N/a	—N/a
July 22, 2018	Syracuse	United States	K-Rockathon	—N/a	—N/a
July 24, 2018	Holmdel	United States	PNC Bank Arts Center	—N/a	—N/a
July 25, 2018	Pittsburgh	United States	KeyBank Pavilion	—N/a	—N/a
July 28, 2018	Montreal	Canada	Heavy Montréal	—N/a	—N/a
July 29, 2018	Bangor	United States	Impact Festival	—N/a	—N/a
July 31, 2018 (Note: Originally scheduled for July 21. Postponed due to severe weather.)	Bristow	United States	Jiffy Lube Live	—N/a	—N/a
August 1, 2018 (Note: Marilyn Manson solo show.)	Charlotte	United States	The Fillmore	—N/a	—N/a
August 2, 2018 (Note: Marilyn Manson solo show.)	Myrtle Beach	United States	House of Blues	—N/a	—N/a
August 5, 2018 (Note: Marilyn Manson solo show.)	Louisville	United States	The Louisville Palace	—N/a	—N/a
August 8, 2018	Mansfield	United States	Xfinity Center	—N/a	—N/a
August 9, 2018	Camden	United States	BB&T Pavilion	—N/a	—N/a
August 11, 2018	Hartford	United States	Xfinity Theatre	—N/a	—N/a
August 12, 2018	Darien Lake	United States	Darien Lake Performing Arts Center	—N/a	—N/a
August 14, 2018	Atlanta	United States	Cellairis Amphitheatre	—N/a	—N/a
August 16, 2018	Dallas	United States	Starplex Pavilion	—N/a	—N/a
August 17, 2018	Austin	United States	Austin360 Amphitheater	—N/a	—N/a
August 18, 2018	Houston	United States	Cynthia Woods Mitchell Pavilion	—N/a	—N/a
August 20, 2018	Denver	United States	Pepsi Center	—N/a	—N/a
August 22, 2018	Salt Lake City	United States	USANA Amphitheatre	—N/a	—N/a
August 24, 2018	San Diego	United States	Mattress Firm Amphitheatre	—N/a	—N/a
August 25, 2018	Las Vegas	United States	MGM Grand Garden Arena	—N/a	—N/a
August 26, 2018	Phoenix	United States	Ak-Chin Pavilion	—N/a	—N/a
August 28, 2018	Concord	United States	Concord Pavilion	—N/a	—N/a
August 29, 2018	Irvine	United States	FivePoint Amphitheatre	—N/a	—N/a
North America
October 22, 2018	Nashville	United States	Marathon Music Works	—N/a	—N/a
October 23, 2018	Knoxville	United States	Knoxville Civic Auditorium	—N/a	—N/a
October 25, 2018	Memphis	United States	The Cannon Center	—N/a	—N/a
October 27, 2018	New Orleans	United States	Voodoo Festival	—N/a	—N/a
October 28, 2018	Birmingham	United States	Iron City	—N/a	—N/a
October 30, 2018	Hollywood	United States	Hard Rock Live	—N/a	—N/a
October 31, 2018	Orlando	United States	Hard Rock Live	—N/a	—N/a
North America: Twins of Evil: The Second Coming Tour (with Rob Zombie)
December 29, 2018	Reno	United States	Grand Sierra Theatre	—N/a	—N/a
December 31, 2018	Los Angeles	United States	Ozzfest NYE	—N/a	—N/a

== Cancelled or rescheduled shows ==
List of cancelled concerts, showing date, city, country, venue and reason for cancellation
Date	City	Country	Venue	Reason
Heaven Upside Down Tour
October 2, 2017	Boston	United States	House of Blues	Manson injured by falling stage prop on September 30 date at the Hammerstein Ballroom. These shows – excluding festival appearances – were rescheduled to January and February 2018.
October 3, 2017	Long Island	United States	The Paramount	Manson injured by falling stage prop on September 30 date at the Hammerstein Ballroom. These shows – excluding festival appearances – were rescheduled to January and February 2018.
October 5, 2017	Toronto	Canada	Rebel	Manson injured by falling stage prop on September 30 date at the Hammerstein Ballroom. These shows – excluding festival appearances – were rescheduled to January and February 2018.
October 7, 2017	Camden	United States	Rock Allegiance Festival	Manson injured by falling stage prop on September 30 date at the Hammerstein Ballroom. These shows – excluding festival appearances – were rescheduled to January and February 2018.
October 8, 2017	Columbus	United States	Express Live!	Manson injured by falling stage prop on September 30 date at the Hammerstein Ballroom. These shows – excluding festival appearances – were rescheduled to January and February 2018.
October 10, 2017	Chicago	United States	Riviera Theatre	Manson injured by falling stage prop on September 30 date at the Hammerstein Ballroom. These shows – excluding festival appearances – were rescheduled to January and February 2018.
October 11, 2017	Milwaukee	United States	Eagles Ballroom	Manson injured by falling stage prop on September 30 date at the Hammerstein Ballroom. These shows – excluding festival appearances – were rescheduled to January and February 2018.
October 12, 2017	Kansas City	United States	Freakers' Ball	Manson injured by falling stage prop on September 30 date at the Hammerstein Ballroom. These shows – excluding festival appearances – were rescheduled to January and February 2018.
October 14, 2017	Houston	United States	Houston Open Air Festival	Manson injured by falling stage prop on September 30 date at the Hammerstein Ballroom. These shows – excluding festival appearances – were rescheduled to January and February 2018.
October 15, 2017	Grand Prairie	United States	Freakers' Ball	Manson injured by falling stage prop on September 30 date at the Hammerstein Ballroom. These shows – excluding festival appearances – were rescheduled to January and February 2018.
October 17, 2017	Tulsa	United States	Brady Theater	Manson injured by falling stage prop on September 30 date at the Hammerstein Ballroom. These shows – excluding festival appearances – were rescheduled to January and February 2018.
October 19, 2017	Denver	United States	The Fillmore	Manson injured by falling stage prop on September 30 date at the Hammerstein Ballroom. These shows – excluding festival appearances – were rescheduled to January and February 2018.
October 20, 2017	Salt Lake City	United States	The Complex	Manson injured by falling stage prop on September 30 date at the Hammerstein Ballroom. These shows – excluding festival appearances – were rescheduled to January and February 2018.
October 22, 2017	Sacramento	United States	Aftershock Festival	Manson injured by falling stage prop on September 30 date at the Hammerstein Ballroom. These shows – excluding festival appearances – were rescheduled to January and February 2018.
October 23, 2017	Oakland	United States	Fox Oakland Theatre	Manson injured by falling stage prop on September 30 date at the Hammerstein Ballroom. These shows – excluding festival appearances – were rescheduled to January and February 2018.
October 26, 2017	Phoenix	United States	Arizona State Fairgrounds	Manson injured by falling stage prop on September 30 date at the Hammerstein Ballroom. These shows – excluding festival appearances – were rescheduled to January and February 2018.
October 27–28, 2017	Las Vegas	United States	House of Blues	Manson injured by falling stage prop on September 30 date at the Hammerstein Ballroom. These shows – excluding festival appearances – were rescheduled to January and February 2018.
Twins of Evil: The Second Coming Tour
July 13, 2018	Oshkosh	United States	Rock USA Festival	Thunderstorms
July 26, 2018	Toronto	Canada	Budweiser Stage	Manson diagnosed with influenza. The concert still took place; Zombie performed an extended set.
August 7, 2018	Wantagh	United States	Jones Beach Theater	Venue flooded

== Personnel ==
- Marilyn Manson – lead vocals, rhythm guitar
- Tyler Bates – lead guitar, backing vocals
- Twiggy – bass, backing vocals (Dismissed from the band on October 25)
- Paul Wiley – rhythm guitar, backing vocals
- Johnny Depp (Guest) – rhythm guitar (Briefly played at the London show)
- Gil Sharone – drums
- Juan Alderete – bass, backing vocals (Played first show on November 5)
- Daniel Fox – keyboards and percussion (From the beginning of the tour, until July 31)

== Opening acts ==
Opening acts Heaven Upside Down Tour / Twins of Evil: The Second Coming Tour
Artist	Dates	Country
North American legs 2017
Alice Glass	September 27 – September 30	United States
European legs 2017
The Charm the Fury	August 5	Netherlands
Amazonica	November 12	Finland
Amazonica	November 14	Sweden
Amazonica	November 15	Denmark
Amazonica	November 16 – November 18	Germany
Amazonica	November 19	Czech Republic
Amazonica	November 20	Austria
Amazonica	November 22	Italy
Amazonica	November 23	Switzerland
Amazonica	December 4 – December 9	United Kingdom
Dinos Chapman	November 25	Germany
Dinos Chapman	November 27	France
Dinos Chapman	November 28	Netherlands
Dinos Chapman	November 29	Germany
Dinos Chapman	December 1	France
Dinos Chapman	December 2	Belgium
North American legs 2018
Amazonica	January 10 – February 16	United States & Canada
Deadly Apples	July 11 – August 29	United States & Canada
Ho99o9	October 22 – October 31	United States
European legs 2018
Ink	May 30	Netherlands
Myrkur	June 4	Denmark
Arabrot	June 5	Norway
Amazonica	June 12	Germany
Amazonica	June 21	France
Amazonica	June 27	Portugal
Stone Sour	June 13	Poland
Duo Opala	June 20	France
