= Raise the Red Flag =

2024 song by Marilyn Manson

Single by Marilyn Manson

from the album One Assassination Under God – Chapter 1
- B-side: "Front Toward Enemy"
- Released: August 16, 2024
- Genre: Industrial metal
- Length: 4:49
- Label: Nuclear Blast
- Songwriters: Marilyn Manson; Tyler Bates
- Producers: Manson; Bates

Marilyn Manson singles chronology
"As Sick as the Secrets Within" (2024)	"Raise the Red Flag" (2024)	"Sacrilegious" (2024)

Music video
- "Raise the Red Flag" on YouTube

"Raise the Red Flag" is a song by American rock band Marilyn Manson from their twelfth studio album, One Assassination Under God – Chapter 1. It was released on August 16, 2024, via Nuclear Blast, and was the band's second single in two weeks, following "As Sick as the Secrets Within". Nuclear Blast issued a limited edition CD maxi single, which was limited to 3,000 copies worldwide and included "As Sick as the Secrets Within" and another new song titled "Front Toward Enemy". The latter song was exclusive to the CD, and does not feature on digital editions of the single.

The song's music video was directed by Bill Yukich, who also directed the video for "As Sick as the Secrets Within". It is a performance-based video featuring appearances from the band's current line-up, which consists of Tyler Bates, Gil Sharone, Piggy D and Reba Meyers. The latter received criticism on social media for joining the band, although she received support from other metal musicians and other members of Manson's band. The song was a commercial success upon release, debuting within the top ten of numerous Billboard charts, and reaching a career-high peak on the UK Singles Sales Chart.

== Composition and style ==
The song's lyric is Manson's response to the abuse allegations, as well as his response to mainstream media. Sputnikmusic called it a "declaration of war on all his detractors", while New Transcendence said the track is "filled with social commentary". Crytpic Rock said the song is "about people who have come at him, and he is tired of it... now, it is his turn." The chorus consists of the lyric: "It's time to beat up the bullies/And wash the bullseye off my back/My red flag is your white one soaked in blood." Sonic Abuse compared the lyric to those of the band's 1994 single "Lunchbox".

"Raise the Red Flag" is an industrial metal song, with elements of heavy metal. Sputnikmusic said the track blends the styles of the band's 2000 album Holy Wood (In the Shadow of the Valley of Death) and their 2003 album The Golden Age of Grotesque. It contains distorted guitars, loud drums and aggressive vocals, with Metal Music Planet calling it a "distorted, bass thumping, great noise of a track!". They went on to described it as "Muddy. Mixed. Distorted bass. Warm guitars rather than a twang of tele[caster]", noting that if the listener wants to "Think of the Marilyn Manson expected sound, think of 'Raise the Red Flag' as that sound. It's massive." Revolver said the track "leans into a more industrialized, dancefloor-ready vibe, with distorted vocals and a churning beat throughout". Metal Injection said it "certainly packs more of a punch" than previous single "As Sick as the Secrets Within". Both Blabbermouth.net and antiMusic described the song as anthemic.

== Release and promotion ==
The track was issued as a single by Nuclear Blast on August 16, 2024, just two weeks after "As Sick as the Secrets Within". That same day, the label released a CD maxi single, which was limited to 3,000 copies worldwide. The CD single contained an exclusive B-side titled "Front Toward Enemy". A music video for "Raise the Red Flag", directed by Bill Yukich, was also released on August 16. Yukich had directed the music videos for "As Sick as the Secrets Within", as well as videos for the band's previous songs "Kill4Me", "Say10", and "Tattooed in Reverse". "Raise the Red Flag" is a performance-based video, and features the song being performed by the band's current line-up: Tyler Bates, Gil Sharone, Piggy D and Reba Meyers.

Meyers was criticized on social media after it was revealed she had joined Manson's band. She released a statement three days after the release of the music video, saying she was "proud to represent the growth, confidence, forgiveness, humanity, and change that comes with this, and to be up there [on stage and in the video] with such talented motherfuckers. Everyone is aiming for growth and not stagnation. World needs that attitude right now. Thanks to all the new peeps that have been showing love and support my way." She received messages of support from Ray Luzier of Korn, Andy Williams of Every Time I Die, Greg Puciato of Better Lovers, and her bandmates Piggy D and Gil Sharone.

== Commercial performance ==
"Raise the Red Flag" debuted at number two on Billboard's Hard Rock Digital Song Sales, making it their second single to enter the chart that month, following the number one peak of "As Sick as the Secrets Within" two weeks earlier. "Raise the Red Flag" was the band's third song to peak at number two on that chart, alongside "Sweet Dreams (Are Made of This)" and "Deep Six". The song peaked in the top ten of several other Billboard charts. It was their fourth top ten single on Alternative Digital Song Sales, their fifth top ten single on Rock Digital Song Sales. and peaked at number eight on Hot Hard Rock Songs.

The song was also successful in the United Kingdom, peaking at number 35 on the UK Singles Sales Chart, their highest ever peak on that chart. It peaked at number 55 on the UK Singles Downloads Chart, and in the top ten of the UK Physical Singles Chart, their first placement on that chart since their cover of "God's Gonna Cut You Down" in 2020.

== Formats and track listings ==
- Digital single
1. "Raise the Red Flag" – 4:49
2. "As Sick as the Secrets Within" – 5:35
- CD single
1. "Raise the Red Flag" – 4:49
2. "As Sick as the Secrets Within" – 5:35
3. "Front Toward Enemy" – 4:26

== Charts ==
Chart performance for "Raise the Red Flag"
Chart (2024)	Peak position
Australia Digital Tracks (ARIA)	37
France Radio (SNEP)	72
France Digital Songs (SNEP)	42
UK Singles Downloads (Official Charts)	55
UK Singles Sales (OCC)	35
UK Physical Singles (OCC)	9
US Hot Hard Rock Songs (Billboard)	8
