= One Assassination Under God – Chapter 1 =

Studio album by Marilyn Manson
- Released: November 22, 2024
- Recorded: April 2023 – April 2024
- Studios: The Abattoir (Los Angeles); NRG (Hollywood); EastWest (Hollywood)
- Genres: Industrial rock; industrial metal; alternative rock; gothic rock
- Length: 43:26
- Label: Nuclear Blast
- Producers: Marilyn Manson; Tyler Bates

Marilyn Manson chronology
We Are Chaos (2020)	One Assassination Under God – Chapter 1 (2024)	One Assassination Under God – Chapter 2 (2026)

Singles from One Assassination Under God – Chapter 1
- 1. "As Sick as the Secrets Within" Released: August 2, 2024; 2. "Raise the Red Flag" Released: August 16, 2024; 3. "Sacrilegious" Released: September 27, 2024

One Assassination Under God – Chapter 1 is the twelfth studio album by American rock band Marilyn Manson. The record was produced by Marilyn Manson and Tyler Bates, and was released by Nuclear Blast on November 22, 2024, on the 61st anniversary of the assassination of John F. Kennedy. It is the band's first album since We Are Chaos in 2020. Shortly after the release of that album, the band was dropped by their label, talent agency and manager when several women accused the vocalist of abuse, allegations he has denied. A four-year criminal investigation of the abuse allegations resulted in no charges being filed against Manson.

The record was primarily recorded at Bates's Los Angeles recording studio, The Abattoir, between April 2023 and April 2024. It features drums performed by Gil Sharone, who also contributed to the band's previous albums The Pale Emperor and Heaven Upside Down. The album was preceded by the release of three singles: "As Sick as the Secrets Within", "Raise the Red Flag" and "Sacrilegious". Music videos were created for all three singles, as well as the album's title track. All four music videos were directed by Bill Yukich. The singles were successful upon release, reaching career-high peaks on several American and British charts.

The album received positive reviews, with publications praising the songwriting, vocals, and production. It was well received by fans, topping numerous year-end fan reader polls. It also performed well commercially, peaking in the top twenty in several major European markets. The live band, consisting of Manson, Bates, Sharone, Piggy D. and Reba Meyers, toured extensively in support of the record. In the summer of 2024, they performed a North American co-headlining tour with Five Finger Death Punch, and performed their own headlining tours of Europe and North America throughout 2025.

== Background and recording ==
The band's eleventh studio album, We Are Chaos, was released in September 2020. On February 1, 2021, the vocalist was accused of abuse by former partner Evan Rachel Wood, with four other women simultaneously posting allegations on social media. Manson denied the allegations, and accused Wood of orchestrating a "coordinated attack". The band was immediately dropped by their record label, talent agency, and longtime manager. Five women filed civil lawsuits against Manson. Two of these were settled out of court, one is ongoing, one was dismissed, while another was withdrawn after the accuser said she was "manipulated and pressured" by Wood and her associates to make false accusations.

Manson filed a civil suit against Wood in 2022, but dropped the lawsuit two years later after the judge in preliminary hearings refused to allow evidence to be presented at the eventual trial, including the refutation of a former accuser. The Los Angeles County Sheriff's Department and a division of the Los Angeles County District Attorney's office conducted a four-year criminal investigation of the abuse allegations. The investigation resulted in no charges being filed against Manson for domestic violence or sexual assault, with a lack of evidence and the statute of limitations cited as the reasons.

The album was recorded between April 2023 and April 2024 at producer Tyler Bates's Los Angeles recording studio The Abattoir, with additional recording taking place at NRG Studios in North Hollywood on July 1 and 2, 2023, and at EastWest Studios in Hollywood on September 25 and 26, 2023. Manson, Bates, and drummer Gil Sharone performed the majority of instrumentation, with Lola Colette and Maxwell Urasky performing piano and programming, respectively, on the track "As Sick as the Secrets Within". Bates and Sharone were Manson's primary collaborators on two of the band's previous albums, The Pale Emperor (2015) and Heaven Upside Down (2017).

== Composition and style ==
One Assassination Under God – Chapter 1 is the first half of my story. These songs were conjured from purgatory, and are as raw as a row of broken teeth that slightly resemble a smile. My art is what I live for. This album means to me exactly what I choose it to mean. I hope when you listen it is the same for you.

— Manson's statement on the album's content

Reviews have ascribed to the album numerous genres, including industrial rock, industrial metal, alternative rock, gothic rock and rock in general. The record is a direct response to the abuse allegations. Blabbermouth.net said the record contains "overt and covert references to his recent troubles, and the overall impression is of a man enraged by what he sees as destructive lies about his personal life." A staff writer for Sputnikmusic compared the album's lyricism to the lyrics on the band's 2000 album Holy Wood (In the Shadow of the Valley of Death). They said that "controversy and pressure are the fuel that ignite Marilyn Manson into action, and through his trials and tribulations he's able to harness some truly fantastic music". Lyrics on the album deal with themes of betrayal, addiction and healing, as well as power and religion, and mortality and societal decay.

In the lyrics of the first track on the album, "One Assassination Under God", Manson discusses the media's reaction to the abuse allegations. The song opens with Manson reciting a poem referencing the assassination of John F. Kennedy. It is a goth metal song that gradually expands to an aggressive outro. Sonic Abuse praised Manson's vocals, describing them as some of the best he ever recorded, and said it was one of the "most affecting" songs the band has recorded. Similarly, New Transcendence praised Manson's vocals for their "raw intensity", as well as instrumentation that builds to a "cathartic climax" and leaves a "lasting impression."

"No Funeral Without Applause" features guitars inspired by post-punk, with Blabbermouth saying the song "continues the elegant, restrained heaviness" of the opening track. Sputnikmusic said its instrumentation was comparable to the band's work between 2003's The Golden Age of Grotesque and 2015's The Pale Emperor, while Sonic Abuse described the song as a "spiritual sequel" to their 1995 cover of Eurythmics's "Sweet Dreams (Are Made of This)". Several other reviews compared the song to the cover of "Sweet Dreams". Crytpic Rock said the lyric "takes jabs at those who wronged Manson. On the same note, he laments his last true love as it starts almost sweet. He is like Pennywise, unassuming... until he opens his mouth. Then, all hell breaks loose as the decibels rise".

"Nod If You Understand"
"Nod If You Understand" is one of the heaviest songs on the album, with numerous reviews favorably comparing it to the material on the band's 1996 album Antichrist Superstar.

"Nod If You Understand" is one of the heaviest songs on the record, with numerous reviews comparing it to the material found on the band's 1996 album Antichrist Superstar. Sputnikmusic said the track "goes into full-blown Antichrist Superstar mode", and called it a "declaration of war on all his detractors". KNAC said the song contains the "rage and theatricality" of Antichrist Superstar, while AllMusic called the song "rabid". Blabbermouth described it as a mixture of industrial and punk rock with metal riffs. New Transcendence said the song finds the band returning to their industrial metal roots, and that the song's lyric is "filled with dark imagery and social commentary." Sonic Abuse said the song "impressively recaptures the raw energy of Manson's early work", calling it one of the album's "finest moments". Spotlight Report said the track is "exactly what fans have been waiting and hoping for", while Metal Planet Music said of the song: "This is it. This is what this album needed to be."

"As Sick as the Secrets Within" is a synthesizer-led goth rock song, with the lyric exploring themes of addiction and self-destruction. Sputnikmusic said the lyric examines a life "wrought in addiction and not worth much of anything." They praised Manson's vocal and Bates' production, noting the song implements styles from several of the band's previous albums. They dubbed it the "best" and "most emotionally charged" track the band had released since Holy Wood. Sonic Abuse said the song is an example of where Manson's "more theatrical sensibilities combine with Tyler Bates's strengths as a composer". They said the song "takes the astringent guitars of The Pale Emperor as a starting point", but takes "a surprising left step into Mechanical Animals territory via 'Coma White'". Metal Planet Music described it as a "wonderful mix of sharp vocals, loud monstrous guitar, gentle piano and a sturdy smack of percussion". Spotlight Report said the song is "definitely the best Manson has been for quite some time and damn it sounds good."

The lyrics of "Sacrilegious" examines a perceived hypocrisy of religion, in which the death of a savior is glorified. Manson instead argues: "You should have treated your saviors better." AllMusic called it "bouncy pop-metal". Numerous reviews compared it to "The Beautiful People", while KNAC compared it to the Antichrist Superstar song "Mister Superstar".

Sonic Abuse described "Death Is Not a Costume" as a turning point for the album. Their writer said it was darker in tone than the previous tracks, comparing the guitar work on the song to Reeves Gabrels' work with The Cure. The lyrics portray an imagined conversation between Manson and Jesus Christ, where Manson says: "I wish I knew you when you were alive." It explores themes of mortality and the fear of death. The track contains elements of post-rock, and gradually increases in intensity. Cryptic Rock noted lyrical similarities to the David Bowie song "Lazarus". They said "Lazarus" found Bowie "acknowledging his mortality with having terminal cancer. Manson's track, on the other hand, does not do that, although it talks about death... like someone's dead to him".

Greg Burk of Metal Jazz said the lyric of "Meet Me in Purgatory" finds Manson asking the listener if they would "stand in the way when they come to murder him. Hubris? Of course. Paranoia? No, look around, it's a fair question. His career was damaged, but he says he's back, and he's right. Strangely, his value has increased. As a target." Sonic Abuse said the song was "less impressive" lyrically when compared to other songs on the album, noting it opts for "repetition over exposition, which is a shame, because the central conceit – that it's far easier to judge over social media than hold up a mirror to your own concerns – is one worth exploring." They described the song musically as a "gritty post-punk inflected piece". Metal Planet Music said the track "isn't complicated, it's just rooted in a darker version of pop".

"Raise the Red Flag" is a heavy metal song, with Metal Planet Music calling it "massive" and a "distorted, bass thumping, great noise of a track!" The title is a pun based on the white flag, a symbol of surrender. The chorus consists of the lyric: "It's time to beat up the bullies/And wash the bullseye off my back/My red flag is your white one soaked in blood." Sonic Abuse compared the lyric to those on the band's 1995 single "Lunchbox", describing it as a "satisfyingly crunchy track" with "stabbing industrial" elements. Sputnikmusic called it a "full-blown rock anthem" that blends the musical styles of Holy Wood and The Golden Age of Grotesque.

The final song on the album is "Sacrifice of the Mass". The title is a reference to the Eucharist, a Christian rite related to the Crucifixion of Jesus. The song is over six minutes in length. The lyric explore themes of religion and spirituality. It finds Manson imagining his own funeral, and contains references to the deaths of his parents. The song's instrumentation features progressive rock elements, beginning with acoustic guitar and keyboards, and gradually expands throughout its duration. Metal Jazz compared the guitar solo at the end to the work of Procol Harum guitarist Robin Trower. Sonic Abuse compared the track to "Man That You Fear" and "Day 3". They said that like those two songs, "Sacrifice of the Mass" finds Manson "singing of his death, seemingly reflecting on the forces he unleashed when he first took on the Manson persona." A writer for Spotlight Report described it as a "haunting finale" and "one hell of an atmospheric end to the record. It stuck with me for quite some time after it was done."

== Release and promotion ==
The vocalist announced on May 16, 2023, that new music was being recorded, when he uploaded a picture of himself singing on social media with the caption: "I've got something for you to hear." Exactly one year later, the band announced they signed a record deal with Nuclear Blast. The same day, both the band and label posted a preview clip of a new music video. The band's first new song in four years, "As Sick as the Secrets Within", was released on August 2, 2024, alongside a music video directed by longtime collaborator Bill Yukich. That same day, they began a North American arena tour with Five Finger Death Punch, with Slaughter to Prevail appearing as the opening act. The band's lineup consists of Manson, Bates, Sharone, Piggy D, and Reba Meyers. The tour was interspersed with the band's own headline shows.

"As Sick as the Secrets Within" debuted at number one on Billboard's Hard Rock Digital Song Sales, their second number one on the chart. It appeared on several other Billboard charts, peaking at number six on Hot Hard Rock Songs, their third top-ten single there. The song was also successful in the United Kingdom, peaking at a career-high number 42 on the UK Singles Downloads Chart, and at number 39 on the UK Singles Sales Chart, their highest peak on that chart since their cover of "Personal Jesus" in 2004.

A CD single for "Raise the Red Flag", was released on August 16 and was limited to 3,000 copies worldwide. Yukich directed the song's music video. Soon after, Meyers was criticized on social media for joining the band. The first female member of the group, she received support from numerous other metal musicians in response. "Raise the Red Flag" peaked at number eight on Billboard's Hot Hard Rock Songs, and at number two on Hard Rock Digital Song Sales, matching the peak of previous singles "Sweet Dreams (Are Made of This)" and "Deep Six". The song was successful in the United Kingdom, peaking at number 35 on the UK Singles Sales Chart, their highest ever peak on that chart, and in the top ten of the UK Physical Singles Chart, their first placement on that chart since their cover of "God's Gonna Cut You Down" in 2020. "Sacrilegious" was issued as a single on September 27. The song's music video was also directed by Yukich.

The album was released on November 22, on the 61st anniversary of the assassination of John F. Kennedy. A music video for the title track was released that same day, which was also directed by Yukich. The album's artwork is a watercolor self-portrait by Manson, incorporating imagery from other sources such as grey aliens, the crucifixion of Jesus, and the mug shot of Donald Trump. The font used on the cover is identical to the one used on Holy Wood. Manson and the band conducted no interviews in advance of the album's release, and reviewers were not provided access to the album prior to its release date. Instead, the band launched the One Assassination Under God Tour in support of the record, performing headlining shows in Europe and North America throughout 2025, as well as a series of festival dates. They released a cover of Phil Collins's "In the Air Tonight" as a non-album single on April 18, 2025, backed by "As Sick as the Secrets Of (Sleep)". The CD single was limited to 4,000 copies, and sold out within four hours of release.

== Critical reception ==
Professional ratings
Review scores
Source	Rating
AllMusic	3/5 stars
Blabbermouth.net	7/10 stars
KNAC	5/5 stars
Sputnikmusic	5/5 stars

The album received a positive reception from critics and fans, topping year-end reader polls by both Metal Injection and Revolver. The latter praised Manson's "defiant" lyricism and his "newly trained-up and cleaned-up vocals." They also praised the production, saying the album "pivots musically from brooding goth rock to dance-floor-stomping industrialism to glammy grandeur". AllMusic said the record merged the "caustic fury" of Antichrist Superstar, the "glam sheen" of Mechanical Animals and the "cinematic scope" of Holy Wood. They compared it to The Pale Emperor, calling it "another strong late-era set" and "one of the tightest records he's ever crafted". However, they said that following the abuse allegations, they found it "impossible to separate the art from the artist." Blabbermouth.net said the album is a "solid and accomplished record with some great tunes." However, they questioned whether people would engage with it to an extent that could "restore Manson's career to its former heights".

Magnus Jørgensen, in a guest review for Globalmetalblog, praised the album, concluding his 5/6-review by stating that "As a cultural event, this album is important. As a lyrical work, it's as inspired as it is volatile. And as a rock album, it's pretty fucking awesome."

KNAC said the album finds Manson transcending his shock rock persona to deliver an introspective album, one where he uses his "unique voice to explore something more profound." They explained the album "feels like the culmination of everything he's been grappling with for decades, an album that balances darkness and beauty with a maturity we've only seen glimpses of before." They summarized by saying the album "isn't just a return to form; it's a transformation, a shedding of old skin to reveal something darker, sharper, and, surprisingly, more human." Similarly, Crytpic Rock said shock value was absent from the record, but said Manson uses the record to "call society, specifically those who think they have power, out on their hypocrisy." New Transcendence said that while the album retains the "signature aggression and dark themes" of the band's previous work, it was more introspective and mature, saying it "delves deeper into personal struggles and societal critique." They called the album a "challenging and rewarding listen." Metal Jazz said the record "seethes with recrimination", but that it "often leavens the bile with moments of beauty." Heavy Metal said the album was better than the majority of their recent releases. They also praised the lyricism, saying Manson has "once again proven to be the smartest guy in the room, and has therefore landed on his feet again after some tumultuous years".

Metal Planet Music praised the album's consistency, describing it as "not only some of Marilyn Manson's best work, it's some of the best work anyone has produced in 2024." Sonic Abuse described it as a concise record, praising Manson's vocals and saying he delivers his "most carefully poised performances in years." They rated the album 8 out of 10, and said the album contains "strong melodies, solid production, and a number of memorable moments", and that it "certainly has much to commend it for those willing to give it a chance." Staff writer Simon.K for Sputnikmusic called it an "explosive return" and praised the songwriting and production, saying Manson thrives when examining and responding to controversy. They said that recent controversies "forced him to write music with real meaning behind it again", and said the album "feels meticulously constructed; you can tell a lot of thought and effort went into every track here, with the overall vibe of the album irrefutably [influenced by] Holy Wood's oppressive atmosphere to set the tone." Spotlight Report rated the album 4 1/2 stars out of 5, saying the album is "absolutely what the fans have been waiting for. It's much darker than the previous record, more in line with the sound that originally drew the fans in, and feels both like a trip down memory lane and a fresh chapter in Manson's career." They praised the album's consistency, saying: "Every single track on the record fits beautifully into the chaos that is Manson and his music. It's also appropriate timing given the state of the world at the moment. The album is dark, it's beautiful, it's raw and emotional and I really bloody enjoyed it. Simple as that."

== Commercial performance ==
One Assassination Under God – Chapter 1 sold over 20,000 copies in the United States on its first week of release, debuting at number five on Billboard's Top Album Sales chart, which ranks albums based on traditional album sales. Industry trade publication Hits Daily Double confirmed the album sold 21,121 copies on its first week, with 19,138 in pure album sales and nearly 2,000 additional sales derived from album-equivalent units. It debuted at number 32 on the Billboard 200, at number six on Top Independent Albums, and at number two on Top Hard Rock Albums.

The record debuted at number four in both Germany and Switzerland, at number six in Austria, and in the top twenty in Belgium, Italy, and Poland. It debuted at number 36 on the UK Albums Chart, with sales of 3,577 copies. The album entered half a dozen charts in the United Kingdom, peaking at number two on UK Rock & Metal Albums, where it was kept off the top spot by Linkin Park's comeback album From Zero. The album spent eight weeks on the chart. It also peaked in the top ten of the Scottish Albums Chart. Its chart performance in the United Kingdom resulted in the band being eligible for the Brit Award for International Artist. This was criticized by a writer for The Independent. In response, a spokesperson for the Brit Awards said that although they condemn "any form of sexual violence or harassment, we also believe in the due process of the law. Artists become eligible based on their musical impact in the previous 12 months, as measured by success in the Official Charts."

== Track listing ==
All tracks are written by Marilyn Manson and Tyler Bates.

No.	Title	Length
1.	"One Assassination Under God"	5:28
2.	"No Funeral Without Applause"	4:06
3.	"Nod If You Understand"	4:05
4.	"As Sick as the Secrets Within"	5:35
5.	"Sacrilegious"	3:35
6.	"Death Is Not a Costume"	4:52
7.	"Meet Me in Purgatory"	4:36
8.	"Raise the Red Flag"	4:49
9.	"Sacrifice of the Mass"	6:15
Total length:		43:26

== Credits and personnel ==
Credits adapted from the album's liner notes.

- Recorded at The Abattoir, Los Angeles between April 2023 and April 2024; additional recording at NRG Studios, North Hollywood, July 1–2, 2023, and EastWest Studios, Hollywood, September 25–26, 2023

=== Musicians ===
- Marilyn Manson – vocals
- Tyler Bates – guitars, bass, keyboards, GuitarViol
- Lola Colette – piano on "As Sick as the Secrets Within"
- Gil Sharone – drums
- Maxwell Urasky – programming on "As Sick as the Secrets Within"

=== Technical personnel ===
- Marilyn Manson – composition, production, album artwork
- Tyler Bates – composition, recording, production
- Will Borza – mastering at Howie Weinberg Mastering
- Robert Carranza – recording and mixing
- Joseph Cultice – photography
- Rob Kimura – artwork layout
- Jake Rene – second engineer at NRG Studios
- Howie Weinberg – mastering at Howie Weinberg Mastering

== Charts ==
Chart performance for One Assassination Under God – Chapter 1
Chart (2024)	Peak position
Australian Albums (ARIA)	44
Austrian Albums (Ö3 Austria)	6
Belgian Albums (Ultratop Flanders)	112
Belgian Albums (Ultratop Wallonia)	16
Danish Vinyl Albums (Hitlisten)	8
Dutch Albums (Album Top 100)	66
Finnish Albums (Suomen virallinen lista)	23
French Albums (SNEP)	25
French Rock & Metal Albums (SNEP)	4
German Albums (Offizielle Top 100)	4
German Alternative Albums (GfK)	1
Hungarian Physical Albums (MAHASZ)	32
Irish Independent Albums (IRMA)	20
Italian Albums (FIMI)	18
Japanese Digital Albums (Oricon)	33
Japanese Hot Albums (Billboard Japan)	39
Japanese Rock Albums (Oricon)	8
New Zealand Albums (RMNZ)	35
Polish Albums (ZPAV)	12
Portuguese Albums (AFP)	46
Scottish Albums (Official Charts)	10
Spanish Albums (PROMUSICAE)	31
Swedish Physical Albums (Sverigetopplistan)	6
Swedish Hard Rock Albums (Sverigetopplistan)	3
Swiss Albums (Schweizer Hitparade)	4
UK Albums (Official Charts)	36
UK Independent Albums (Official Charts)	3
UK Rock & Metal Albums (Official Charts)	2
US Billboard 200	32
US Top Hard Rock Albums (Billboard)	2
US Independent Albums (Billboard)	6
US Top Rock & Alternative Albums (Billboard)	6
