= As Sick as the Secrets Within =

2024 song by Marilyn Manson

Single by Marilyn Manson

from the album One Assassination Under God – Chapter 1
- Released: August 2, 2024
- Genre: Gothic rock
- Length: 5:35
- Label: Nuclear Blast
- Songwriters: Marilyn Manson; Tyler Bates
- Producers: Manson; Bates

Marilyn Manson singles chronology
"Don't Chase the Dead" (2020)	"As Sick as the Secrets Within" (2024)	"Raise the Red Flag" (2024)

Music video
- "As Sick as the Secrets Within" on YouTube

"As Sick as the Secrets Within" is a song by American rock band Marilyn Manson. It serves as the first single to the band's twelfth studio album, One Assassination Under God – Chapter 1. It was issued as a one-track digital download on August 2, 2024, via Nuclear Blast, marking the band's first single in four years. An accompanying music video, directed by Bill Yukich, was released the same day. The song was a commercial success upon release, reaching a career-high peak on the UK Singles Downloads Chart, and in the top ten of several Billboard charts.

== Background ==
"As Sick as the Secrets Within" is the first song the band released since their 2020 album We Are Chaos. Several months after that album was released, several women accused the vocalist of abuse, allegations he has denied. Following the accusations, the band was dropped by their record label Loma Vista Recordings, talent agency Creative Artists Agency, and longtime manager.

The band's vocalist first teased new music on May 16, 2023, in an image he posted on social media featuring him singing into a microphone with the caption "I've got something for you to hear." Exactly one year later, it was announced the band had signed a new record deal with Nuclear Blast, when the band and label posted a preview clip for a new music video.

== Composition and style ==
The track was recorded and produced by Manson alongside Tyler Bates. It is a synthesizer-based gothic rock song, featuring piano and acoustic guitar, and "loud monstrous" guitars and "a sturdy smack of percussion." Manson described the track as a "personal look into my life, and I'm proud to be able to share my art and vision with you." The song's lyric incorporates themes of addition and self-destruction. A staff writer for Sputnikmusic praised Manson's vocal performance, and said the song is "the best thing he's released in twenty-four years. The impeccable production and implementation of styles from Mechanical Animals, Holy Wood and The Golden Age of Grotesque form the buttress needed to convey the [band's] most emotionally charged track in nearly a quarter-of-a-century." Metal Jazz described it as "maybe the densest and most dynamic" song on the album.

Sonic Abuse praised the collaboration between Manson and Bates on the track, saying Manson's "more theatrical sensibilities combine with Tyler Bates's strengths as a composer". They said the song uses "the astringent guitars of The Pale Emperor as a starting point", but "takes a surprising left step into Mechanical Animals territory via 'Coma White', the crooked melody and heavily accented synth parts painting a dark picture". Spotlight Report said the track "embraces Manson's darkness, his emotion, and highlights the talent within. This is definitely the best Manson has been for quite some time and damn it sounds good."

== Release and promotion ==
The song was issued as a one-track digital download on August 2, 2024, the same date the band began an arena tour with Five Finger Death Punch in North America, with Slaughter to Prevail appearing as the opening act. These were Marilyn Manson's first concerts since the completion of their 2019 co-headlining tour with Rob Zombie, the "Twins of Evil: Hell Never Dies Tour". The tour was interspersed with Marilyn Manson's own headlining shows, with "As Sick as the Secrets Within" being premiered live on August 3 at The Fillmore Silver Spring in Maryland, during their first headlining show of the tour.

Its music video was released on August 2, and was directed by the band's longtime visual collaborator Bill Yukich. He had previously directed music videos for the band's earlier songs "Kill4Me", "Say10", and "Tattooed in Reverse". The video features religious iconography, including imagery of fallen angels, the Virgin Mary, and scenes of Manson drinking from the sacred chalice and writing with a human skull beside him; the latter scene was inspired by Caravaggio's early 17th century painting Saint Jerome in Meditation. The video also contains imagery of cephalopods, and scenes in which Manson is trapped within and breaks out of a cephalopod-type skin or placenta. These scenes have been compared to Japanese ero guro and Lovecraftian horror.

A remix of the song entitled "As Sick as the Secrets of (Sleep)" was featured as the B-side to the band's 2025 single "In the Air Tonight", which was released on April 16, 2025.

== Commercial performance ==
Over its debut weekend, the song's music video received over a million views on YouTube and almost 3 million views globally across all digital platforms. "As Sick as the Secrets Within" debuted at number one on Billboard's Hard Rock Digital Song Sales, selling 1,300 copies on its first week. Their thirteenth single to enter the chart, it was the band's second number one single there, following "We Are Chaos" in 2020. The song appeared on several other Billboard charts. It peaked at number five on Alternative Digital Songs, the band's second-highest peak there, following the number four peak of their 2018 cover of "Cry Little Sister". It also peaked at number six on Hot Hard Rock Songs, making it their third top ten single on that chart, and at number seven on Hot Rock Digital Songs. Following the release of subsequent single "Raise the Red Flag" two weeks later, "As Sick as the Secrets Within" entered the top ten of Billboard's Hard Rock Digital Song Sales for a second week, reaching number seven.

The song was also successful in the United Kingdom. It peaked at number 42 on the UK Singles Downloads Chart, the band's highest peak on that chart until "Raise the Red Flag" peaked at number 35 two weeks later. It also peaked at number 39 on the UK Singles Downloads Chart, the band's highest peak on that chart since their cover of "Personal Jesus" in 2004.

== Charts ==
Chart performance for "As Sick as the Secrets Within"
Chart (2024)	Peak position
Australia Digital Tracks (ARIA)	41
France Radio (SNEP)	76
France Digital Songs (SNEP)	40
UK Singles Downloads (Official Charts)	39
UK Singles Sales (OCC)	42
US Hot Hard Rock Songs (Billboard)	6
