= In the Air Tonight =

1981 single by Phil Collins

- Handwriting font variant of the picture sleeve (also used for the parent album Face Value)

Single by Phil Collins

from the album Face Value
- B-side: "The Roof Is Leaking"
- Written: 1980
- Released: 9 January 1981
- Studio: Townhouse (London, England)
- Genre: Experimental pop; soft rock; synth-rock
- Length: 5:34 (album version); 4:59 (single edit)
- Label: Virgin; Atlantic
- Songwriter: Phil Collins
- Producers: Phil Collins; Hugh Padgham

Phil Collins singles chronology
| "In the Air Tonight" (1981) | "I Missed Again" (1981) |
| "Separate Lives" (1985) | "In the Air Tonight" (1988) | "A Groovy Kind of Love" (1988) |
| "You Touch My Heart" (2005) | "In the Air Tonight" (2007) | "(Love Is Like a) Heatwave" (2010) |

Music video
- "In the Air Tonight" on YouTube

"In the Air Tonight" is a song by the English drummer and singer-songwriter Phil Collins. It was released as the lead single from Collins's debut solo studio album, Face Value, in January 1981. It was selected as the second single from the album in the United States and Canada, after "I Missed Again".

Collins co-produced "In the Air Tonight" with Hugh Padgham, who became a frequent collaborator in the following years. It reached No. 2 on the UK Singles Chart. It reached No. 1 in Austria, Sweden, Switzerland and West Germany, No. 2 in Canada, and the top 10 in Australia, New Zealand and several other European territories. In the United States, it reached No. 19 on the Billboard Hot 100 and reached No. 2 on the Rock Tracks Chart, later certified gold by the RIAA, representing 500,000 copies sold. The song's music video, directed by Stuart Orme, received heavy play on MTV when the new cable music video channel launched in August 1981.

"In the Air Tonight" remains one of Collins' most prominent hits, often cited as his signature song, and is especially famous for its drum break towards the end, which has been described as "the sleekest, most melodramatic drum break in history" and one of the "101 Greatest Drumming Moments". In 2006, the song was ranked at No. 35 on VH1's "100 Greatest Songs of the 80s". In 2021, it was listed at No. 291 on Rolling Stone's "500 Greatest Songs of All Time".

== Background and recording ==
=== Inspiration ===
Collins wrote the song amid the grief he felt after divorcing his first wife Andrea Bertorelli in 1980. In a 2016 interview, Collins said of the song's lyrics: "I wrote the lyrics spontaneously. I'm not quite sure what the song is about, but there's a lot of anger, a lot of despair and a lot of frustration." In a 1997 BBC Radio 2 documentary, the singer revealed that the divorce contributed to his 1979 hiatus from the band Genesis, until the band regrouped in October of that year to record the album Duke. Collins remembered playing the song to Mike Rutherford and Tony Banks but he felt it was too simple for the group.

=== Musical style ===
"In the Air Tonight" sample
The end of the song's second verse, the iconic drum break, and the beginning of the final chorus.

"In the Air Tonight" has been described as being "at the vanguard of experimental pop" in 1981 and "a rock oddity classic", having been influenced by "the unconventional studio predilections of Brian Eno and Peter Gabriel". It has also been described as a "soft rock classic." and a "synth-rock masterpiece." Musically, the song consists of a series of chords played on a Sequential Circuits Prophet-5 over a simple drum machine pattern (the Roland CR-78 Disco-2 pattern, plus some programming); processed electric guitar sounds and vocoded vocals, an effect which is increased on key words to add additional atmosphere. The mood is one of restrained anger until the final chorus when an explosive burst of drums finally releases the musical tension and the instrumentation explodes into a thunderous crescendo. Composed in D minor, it has a moderate tempo of 96 beats per minute.

Collins has described obtaining the drum machine specifically to deal with personal issues relating to his divorce through songwriting, telling Mix magazine: "I had to start writing some of this music that was inside me". He improvised the lyrics during a songwriting session in the studio: "I was just fooling around. I got these chords that I liked, so I turned the mic on and started singing. The lyrics you hear are what I wrote spontaneously. That frightens me a bit, but I'm quite proud of the fact that I sang 99.9 percent of those lyrics spontaneously".

=== Drum sound ===
The song is known for its use of the gated reverb drum sound. Fellow musicians and journalists have commented on its use in the record. Black Sabbath singer Ozzy Osbourne called the drum fill "the best ever – it still sounds awesome", while music critic and broadcaster Stuart Maconie was quoted:

Musically, it's an extraordinarily striking record, because almost nothing happens in it ... It's the drum sound in particular that's amazing. You don't hear it at all for the first two minutes of the song ... then there's that great doo-dom doo-dom doo-dom comes in, and the drums come in half way through the song, setting the template for all the Eighties drum songs after that.

The U.S single version of "In the Air Tonight" features extra drums that play underneath the song until the signature drum crash appears. These were added at the suggestion of Atlantic Records head Ahmet Ertegun. In 2007, Collins wrote:

Ahmet came down to the final mix in the cutting room in New York ... The drums don't come in until the end but Ahmet didn't know that at this point, because on the demo the drums hadn't come in at all; it was only drum machine all the way. And he was saying, "Where's the down beat, where's the backbeat?" I said, "The drums come in in a minute." "Yeah, you know that and I know that, but the kids don't know that; you've got to put the drums on earlier." So we added some drums to the mix and put it out as a single.

== Release ==
Speaking about the song's rapid ascension in the music charts, Collins wrote the following in 2007:

It was a surprise. The single came in at No. 36, I did Top of the Pops with Dave Lee Travis, and in one of the down moments he said, "This record is going to be a top three." I didn't believe him, because it had been made so haphazardly, but the next week, there it was at No. 3. And then Mark Chapman shot John Lennon and that was that.

"In the Air Tonight" peaked at No. 2 in the UK singles chart; it was kept from No. 1 by John Lennon's "Woman", which had been released as a posthumous single following Lennon's murder.

== Critical reception ==
Record World called the song "futuristic pop that's also rhythmically captivating." Cashbox described "In the Air Tonight" as "ethereally electronic" that "relies on atmosphere more so than melody to transport the listener." They also felt that the "dramatic drum break alone makes the record a standout."

== Urban legend ==
An urban legend has arisen about "In the Air Tonight", according to which the lyrics are based on a drowning incident in which someone who was close enough to save the victim did not help him, while Collins, who was too far away to help, looked on. Increasingly embellished variations on the legend emerged over time, with the stories often culminating in Collins singling out the guilty party while singing the song at a concert. Collins has denied all such stories; he commented on the legends about the song in a BBC World Service interview:

I don't know what this song is about. When I was writing this I was going through a divorce. And the only thing I can say about it is that it's obviously in anger. It's the angry side, or the bitter side of a separation. So what makes it even more comical is when I hear these stories which started many years ago, particularly in America, of someone come up to me and say, "Did you really see someone drowning?" I said, "No, wrong." And then every time I go back to America the story gets Chinese whispers, it gets more and more elaborate. It's so frustrating, 'cause this is one song out of all the songs probably that I've ever written that I really don't know what it's about, you know?

The urban legend was referred to by Eminem in his 2000 single "Stan":

You know the song by Phil Collins, "In the Air of the Night" [sic]
About that guy who coulda saved that other guy from drownin'
But didn't, then Phil saw it all, then at a show he found him?

== Music video ==
The music video (directed by Stuart Orme) animates the photograph of Collins's face from the cover of the Face Value album, slowly fading in through the introduction until it fills the screen, singing the first chorus. The video then cuts to Collins sitting in an empty room at night. Twice a spectral figure appears in the window, but only the second time does Collins get up to look at it, then is shown walking to the one door of the room.

Collins's face returns for the second chorus. He is then shown leaving the room and entering a hallway full of doors. The first one is locked, then the second opens and Collins sees himself looking at the window again, only now the spectre has turned into his own reflection.

The third door is locked, but as the fourth one opens, the drum break sounds and the viewer is returned to Collins's face again, this time in thermal coloring, which gradually reverts to black and white. His reflection from the window is briefly superimposed on the face, this time seemingly reflected in water. Collins recedes into the darkness as the song repeats and fades.

In 1983 the music video was released on the home video Phil Collins available on VHS and LaserDisc which received a Grammy nomination for Best Video, Short Form.

== Performance ==
"In the Air Tonight" remains a popular selection on classic rock radio stations. It is the song most often associated with Collins' solo career, and he has performed it at many events, including Live Aid, where he played the song on a piano on the same calendar day in both Philadelphia and London. He also performed the song at The Secret Policeman's Ball, which was his first live performance as a solo artist. "I remember doing 'In the Air Tonight' at Live Aid," he recalled, "and [Pete] Townshend saying, 'Are you going to do that fucking song again?' as if it was the only one I ever played."

== Legacy ==
The song appeared as part of the soundtrack for the 1983 movie Risky Business and plays when the characters played by Tom Cruise and Rebecca De Mornay have sex on a subway train.

In 1984, the song was used in a scene from the first episode of the television series Miami Vice, which film and television critic Matt Zoller Seitz cited as why the song has been stamped as "Property of Michael Mann" (the series' executive producer) for years, rarely being used in other screen works due to its indelible use in the series. "In the Air Tonight" received a new wave of attention thanks to its use in the series, enough for it to rise in sales outside the Billboard Hot 100 at No. 102.

The song played in the Pilot Episode of the 2013 TV Series The Americans. It is a direct homage to the iconic pilot episode of Miami Vice, where night driving, long wordless scenes, and glances by the main characters as they head into the night to finish up a covert operation.

The song was remixed in 1988 by Ben Liebrand for his weekly appearance in the Curry & Van Inkel radio show on Dutch radio. The mix was completed and then taken by Liebrand to be part of a mix showcase at the DMC Mixing Championship Finals in London, attended by 3500 worldwide deejays. The mix was picked up by Virgin Records for an official release, which reached No. 4 on the UK chart.

In 2006, the song appeared in the PSP and PS2 video game Grand Theft Auto: Vice City Stories, during the Collin's concert in the Hyman Memorial Stadium, during the mission with the song name.

The song gained notoriety again when it was used in a 2007 Cadbury's Dairy Milk advert featuring a man in a gorilla suit warming up and playing the drum fill towards the end of the advert. Collins stated in a BBC interview that he thought the advert was 'fantastic'. The song eventually reached No. 14 on the UK singles chart. That same year it was also included on the animated comedy film Aqua Teen Hunger Force Colon Movie Film for Theaters.

The song appeared in the 2009 movie The Hangover when boxer Mike Tyson, playing a fictionalized version of himself, orders a roomful of bewildered people to be quiet so he can mimic playing the drum break. Rolling Stone noted "The Hangover marked the moment where the Fill broke through to another level of pop-cultural immortality."

In July 2020, a video reaction to the song by TwinsthenewTrend increased the sales and streaming of Collins's original version. The TwinsthenewTrend first-listen video was viewed 4.9 million times in its first two weeks online. Continued popularity brought new traffic to the Collins song which rose to No. 3 on Billboard's Digital Song Sales chart in August 2020.

Since the 2023 NFL season, a cover version by Chris Stapleton, Cindy Blackman Santana, and Snoop Dogg has opened up each edition of ESPN's Monday Night Football, with unique lyrics each week describing the playing teams.

On 15 November 2024, the song was used by Jake Paul as his entrance song in his boxing match against Mike Tyson, the first live event to be broadcast by Netflix. In March 2025, it played on the soundtrack of eighth episode of Season 1 of The Hunting Party.

== Single and credits ==
VSK102 UK Single Release (Martin H)

1. "In the Air Tonight"
2. "The Roof Is Leaking"

Sleeve includes a black and white 12-page cartoon storyboard drawn by Collins' brother Clive Collins.

UK and US single (1981)

1. "In the Air Tonight" – 4:57
  - Phil Collins – Roland CR-78 drum machine, vocals, drums, Prophet 5 synthesizer, Rhodes piano, Roland VP-330 vocoder
  - John Giblin – bass
  - Daryl Stuermer – guitar
  - L. Shankar – violins
2. "The Roof Is Leaking" – 3:36
  - Phil Collins – piano, vocal
  - Daryl Stuermer – banjo
  - Joe Partridge – slide guitar
- A demo track for "In the Air Tonight" also appeared on the "If Leaving Me Is Easy" single.

12" German maxi-single (1981)

1. "In the Air Tonight" (album version) – 5:35
  - Phil Collins – Roland CR-78 drum machine, vocals, drums, Prophet 5 synthesizer, Rhodes piano, Roland VP-330 vocoder
  - John Giblin – bass
  - Daryl Stuermer – guitar
  - L. Shankar – violins
2. "The Roof Is Leaking" – 3:36
  - Phil Collins – piano, vocal
  - Daryl Stuermer – banjo
  - Joe Partridge – slide guitar

Japan CD single (1988)

1. "In the Air Tonight" (extended)
2. "In the Air Tonight" ('88 remix)
3. "I Missed Again" (Album Version)

German CD single (1990)

1. "In the Air Tonight" (extended version) – 7:33 (Additional production by Ben Liebrand)
2. "In the Air Tonight" ('88 remix) – 5:07 (Remixed by Phil Collins and Hugh Padgham)
3. "I Missed Again" – 3:42

(catalogue 2292-57672-2)

== Personnel ==
"In the Air Tonight"

- Phil Collins – Roland CR-78 drum machine, vocals, drums, Prophet 5 synthesizer, Rhodes piano, Roland VP-330 vocoder
- John Giblin – bass
- Daryl Stuermer – guitar
- L. Shankar – violins

"The Roof Is Leaking"

- Phil Collins – piano, vocal
- Daryl Stuermer – banjo
- Joe Partridge – slide guitar

== Charts ==
=== Weekly charts ===
| Chart (1981) | Peak position |
|---|---|
| Australia (Kent Music Report) | 3 |
| Austria (Ö3 Austria Top 40) | 1 |
| Belgium (Ultratop 50 Flanders) | 3 |
| Canada Top Singles (RPM) | 2 |
| France (SNEP) | 11 |
| Ireland (IRMA) | 2 |
| Italy (Musica e dischi) | 6 |
| Netherlands (Dutch Top 40) | 1 |
| Netherlands (Single Top 100) | 2 |
| New Zealand (RIANZ) | 6 |
| Norway (VG-lista) | 4 |
| South Africa (Springbok Radio) | 2 |
| Spain (AFE) | 7 |
| Sweden (Sverigetopplistan) | 1 |
| Switzerland (Schweizer Hitparade) | 1 |
| UK Singles (OCC) | 2 |
| UK Airplay (Record Business) | 6 |
| US Billboard Hot 100 | 19 |
| US Mainstream Rock Airplay (Billboard) | 2 |
| West Germany (GfK) | 1 |
| Zimbabwe (ZIMA) | 4 |

| Chart (1988–1989) | Peak position |
|---|---|
| Australia (ARIA) | 47 |
| Europe (European Hot 100 Singles) | 17 |
| Netherlands (Single Top 100) | 17 |
| UK Singles (OCC) | 4 |
| UK Airplay (Music Week) | 4 |
| West Germany (Media Control) | 3 |

| Chart (2007–2008) | Peak position |
|---|---|
| New Zealand (Recorded Music NZ) | 1 |
| UK Singles (OCC) | 14 |

| Chart (2012) | Peak position |
|---|---|
| France (SNEP) | 102 |

| Chart (2017) | Peak position |
|---|---|
| Poland Airplay (ZPAV) | 39 |

| Chart (2020) | Peak position |
|---|---|
| Hungary (Single Top 40) | 28 |
| US Hot Rock & Alternative Songs (Billboard) | 9 |

=== Year-end charts ===
| Chart (1981) | Rank |
|---|---|
| Australia (Kent Music Report) | 23 |
| Austria (Ö3 Austria Top 40) | 7 |
| Belgium (Ultratop) | 31 |
| Canada Top Singles (RPM) | 27 |
| Netherlands (Dutch Top 40) | 11 |
| Netherlands (Single Top 100) | 8 |
| New Zealand (RIANZ) | 35 |
| Switzerland (Schweizer Hitparade) | 5 |
| West Germany (Media Control) | 5 |

| Chart (1989) | Rank |
|---|---|
| European Hot 100 Singles | 38 |
| West Germany (Media Control) | 26 |

| Chart (2007) | Rank |
|---|---|
| UK Singles (OCC) | 75 |

| Chart (2008) | Rank |
|---|---|
| New Zealand (RIANZ) | 23 |

== Certifications ==
| Region | Certification | Certified units/sales |
|---|---|---|
| Denmark (IFPI Danmark) Digital single | Platinum | 90,000^{‡} |
| Germany (BVMI) Physical single | Gold | 250,000^{^} |
| Italy (FIMI) Digital single | Platinum | 50,000^{‡} |
| New Zealand (RMNZ) Physical single | Gold | 10,000^{*} |
| New Zealand (RMNZ) | 6× Platinum | 180,000^{‡} |
| Poland (ZPAV) | Gold | 25,000^{‡} |
| Spain (Promusicae) | Platinum | 60,000^{‡} |
| United Kingdom (BPI) Physical single | Gold | 500,000^{^} |
| United Kingdom (BPI) Digital single | 3× Platinum | 1,800,000^{‡} |
| United States (RIAA) Physical single | Gold | 500,000^{^} |
| United States (RIAA) Digital single | 3× Platinum | 3,000,000^{‡} |
^{*} Sales figures based on certification alone.^{^} Shipments figures based on certification alone.^{‡} Sales+streaming figures based on certification alone.

== Lil' Kim version ==
"In the Air Tonite"

Single by Lil' Kim featuring Phil Collins

from the album Urban Renewal
- Released: 1 July 2001
- Genre: R&B; hip-hop
- Length: 4:07
- Label: WEA
- Songwriters: Kimberly Jones; Phil Collins
- Producer: The Neptunes

Lil' Kim singles chronology
| "Lady Marmalade" (2001) | "In the Air Tonite" (2001) | "Kimnotyze" (2002) |

Phil Collins singles chronology
| "Son of Man" (2000) | "In the Air Tonite" (2001) | "Can't Stop Loving You" (2002) |

"In the Air Tonite" is a reworking of Phil Collins' 1981 single "In the Air Tonight" recorded by American rapper Lil' Kim for the Phil Collins tribute album Urban Renewal. The song, promoted as a duet between Collins and Lil' Kim, was released in 2001 as the second single from the album. The song's accompanying music video combines scenes from the original video with new scenes featuring Lil' Kim. It was featured in The Box Netherlands HitMix 2001. The single has been certified Platinum in Germany by the IFPI.

=== Charts ===
Weekly chart performance for "In the Air Tonite"
| Chart (2001) | Peak position |
|---|---|
| Australia (ARIA) | 91 |
| Austria (Ö3 Austria Top 40) | 8 |
| Belgium (Ultratop 50 Flanders) | 7 |
| Belgium (Ultratop 50 Wallonia) | 19 |
| Canada (Nielsen SoundScan) | 18 |
| Europe (Eurochart Hot 100) | 17 |
| Germany (GfK) | 3 |
| Netherlands (Dutch Top 40) | 33 |
| Netherlands (Single Top 100) | 30 |
| Polish Airplay Chart | 23 |
| Scottish Singles Sales (Official Charts) | 45 |
| Sweden (Sverigetopplistan) | 27 |
| Switzerland (Schweizer Hitparade) | 11 |
| UK Singles (Official Charts) | 26 |
| UK Dance (Official Charts) | 18 |
| UK Hip Hop/R&B (Official Charts) | 3 |

Year-end chart performance for "In the Air Tonite"
| Chart (2001) | Position |
|---|---|
| Austria (Ö3 Austria Top 40) | 73 |
| Belgium (Ultratop 50 Flanders) | 65 |
| Germany (Official German Charts) | 28 |
| Switzerland (Schweizer Hitparade) | 65 |
| Chart (2002) | Position |
| Canada (Nielsen SoundScan) | 177 |

== Marilyn Manson version ==
"In the Air Tonight"

Single by Marilyn Manson
- B-side: "As Sick as the Secrets Of (Sleep)"
- Released: 16 April 2025
- Length: 5:02
- Label: Nuclear Blast
- Songwriter: Phil Collins
- Producer: Tyler Bates

Marilyn Manson singles chronology
| "Sacrilegious" (2024) | "In the Air Tonight" (2025) | "God Is a Weapon" (2025) |

American rock band Marilyn Manson released a cover of "In the Air Tonight" on 16 April 2025 as a non-album single, to promote an upcoming tour and the band's 2024 album One Assassination Under God – Chapter 1. The CD single contained the B-side "As Sick as the Secrets Of (Sleep)", a reimagining of "As Sick as the Secrets Within". The cover was produced by Tyler Bates and features drums by Gil Sharone. It is faithful to the original musically, retaining the drum break, but adds elements of gothic rock such as distorted guitars, ambient piano, and screamed vocals.

=== Release ===
The single was commercially successful upon release. Limited to 4,000 copies worldwide, the CD single sold out within four hours of release. The song entered several charts in the United Kingdom, peaking at No. 2 on the UK Physical Singles Chart, No. 15 on the UK Singles Sales Chart, and No. 37 on the UK Singles Downloads Chart. The song debuted at No. 1 Billboard's Hard Rock Digital Song Sales, the band's third No. 1 single on that chart. It was the band's fifth top 10 hit on the Hot Hard Rock Songs chart, and also peaked at No. 22 on Billboard's Digital Song Sales chart, the band's highest peak on that chart.

=== Critical reception ===
Metal Insider reviewer Zenae Zukowski said Manson's version of "In the Air Tonight" retains the "signature ominous edge" of some of the band's previous covers, such as "Sweet Dreams (Are Made of This)" and "Tainted Love". They said the cover adds a "dark, cinematic tone" that "feels tailor-made for a modern horror film." A harsh review came from Headbangers who panned the cover for sounding like "an angry toaster trying to seduce a haunted fax machine in a dark alley behind Hot Topic", rating it 0 out of 5 stars.

=== Track listing ===
"In the Air Tonight" written by Phil Collins; "As Sick as the Secrets Of (Sleep)" written by Marilyn Manson and Tyler Bates.

1. "In the Air Tonight" – 5:02
2. "As Sick as the Secrets Of (Sleep)" – 5:00

=== Charts ===
Chart performance for "In the Air Tonight"
| Chart (2025) | Peak position |
|---|---|
| Australia Digital Tracks (ARIA) | 24 |
| Canada Hot Digital Songs (Billboard) | 16 |
| New Zealand Hot Singles (RMNZ) | 22 |
| UK Singles Downloads (Official Charts) | 37 |
| UK Singles Sales (OCC) | 15 |
| US Digital Song Sales (Billboard) | 22 |
| US Hot Hard Rock Songs (Billboard) | 10 |

== Cover versions ==
- In 2006, a cover of the song by Miami-based rock band Nonpoint was featured in the movie adaptation of Miami Vice and on their 2004 album Recoil.
- The Protomen released a cover as part of their covers album The Cover Up: Original Soundtrack from the Motion Picture, which had a full album release in 2015. The album is styled with a hidden narrative, being the surviving soundtrack to a banned movie within the universe of their dystopian three act rock opera tragedy, which is influenced by "Reagan-era media" like "In the Air Tonight". The cover of "In the Air Tonight" was later featured in the third season of Cobra Kai in 2021 and as a result was the 7th top song on Shazam for the first half of 2021. They frequently cover the song live to positive responses. Nashville Scene enthused: "They nailed that one, iconic drum fill and all."
- In 2016, the band Mic Lowry released an adaptation of the song titled "Oh Lord". A music video was released on 29 September 2016 on the band's official YouTube page. The band was chosen Elvis Duran's Artist of the Month for March 2017 and were invited to perform the song nationwide in the United States through The Today Show presented by Kathie Lee Gifford and Hoda Kotb. They also performed live on The Wendy Williams Show on 8 March 2017. The song charted in the UK Singles Chart reaching No. 54 on the chart.
- In 2017, the band In This Moment recorded a cover for their album, Ritual.
- Marissa Nadler and Stephen Brodsky recorded a cover in 2019.
- Chris Stapleton, Snoop Dogg and Cindy Blackman Santana recorded a cover version as the theme song for Monday Night Football in 2023.
