= TwinsthenewTrend =

YouTube channel

- Born: Tim and Fred Williams; 1998

YouTube information
- Channel: TwinsthenewTrend
- Genre: Music
- Subscribers: 886 thousand
- Views: 178 million
- Last updated: July 1, 2025

TwinsthenewTrend is a YouTube channel featuring twin brothers Tim and Fred Williams, who reside in Gary, Indiana, critiquing music videos. In 2020, the channel gained attention when their videos reacting to popular music, heard for the first time by the duo, became the subject of numerous news stories and publicity. Their reaction videos are titled with the prefix, "First Time Hearing."

A video showing their reaction to listening to the 1981 song "In the Air Tonight" by Phil Collins became famous worldwide, garnering more than 6 million views in three weeks. The publicity caused the song to reach #2 on the iTunes top songs sales for August 18 and 19, almost 40 years after its release. Industry publication Variety reported that the song was the fourth biggest selling song of the week ending August 8, up from number 185 the week before.

The brothers, who say they were raised primarily on gospel and Christian rap music, have reacted to a wide range of music, including rock, country, opera, rhythm and blues and Japanese music.

The YouTube channel's reviews have attracted the attention of the original singers of popular hits. The brothers' reaction to the song "Fallin'" by Alicia Keys, "Jolene" by Dolly Parton, and "Sweet Dreams (Are Made of This)" by Annie Lennox prompted direct social media reactions from the artists.

In 2021, they said that although they had posted more than 900 videos to Youtube, they were not receiving much revenue, since "at lot of the material is copyrighted so we don’t get anything for it."
