= Tattooed in Reverse =

Promotional single by Marilyn Manson

from the album Heaven Upside Down
- Released: March 6, 2018
- Genre: Glam rock; electro; gothic rock
- Length: 4:24
- Label: Loma Vista
- Songwriters: Marilyn Manson; Tyler Bates
- Producer: Bates

Music video
- "Tattooed in Reverse" on YouTube

"Tattooed in Reverse" is a song by American rock band Marilyn Manson. It was first released as the second track on the band's tenth studio album, Heaven Upside Down (2017). The song was released as an airplay-only promotional single in the United States on March 6, 2018, when it was serviced to active rock radio formats. It peaked at number 35 on Billboard's Mainstream Rock Chart, making Heaven Upside Down their first album since 1998's Mechanical Animals to contain more than one charting song on Mainstream Rock, following the top five peak of preceding single "Kill4Me".

The song received positive reviews upon release, with several publications praising its lyrics and Tyler Bates' production. The music video was directed by Bill Yukich and uploaded onto YouTube on March 22. It stars model Glo Taylorr as a patient in a psychiatric hospital, and features cameo appearances by Courtney Love and Lisa Marie Presley, who portray nurses. The video also received generally positive reviews, with writers favorably comparing it to some of the band's earlier music videos, while noting similarities to the imagery of American television series American Horror Story.

== Composition and style ==
In one of the first reviews published online for parent album Heaven Upside Down, Greg Kennelty of Metal Injection said that "Tattooed in Reverse" uses "a swung rhythm effectively because it comes off less like Manson trying to emulate a jazzier feel, and more like he's brandishing a bat and slowly pacing the floor until he decides to cave your skull in. 'Tatooted in Reverse' makes one thing evident that could only be assumed whilst listening to [preceding track] 'Revelation #12'—Manson is going to liberally use distortion on Heaven Upside Down, and it's going to work extremely well for him. The fuzzy guitars, keyboards, vocals, and bass all retain their own identities through the heavy haze, but ultimately become this massive ball of threateningly vile sound when used all at once. It's great."

The same publication later described it as one of the "catchier numbers" on the record, while The Line of Best Fit called it an album highlight. Other writers, such as Lina Lecaro of Consequence of Sound and Sasha Geffen of Pitchfork, said the song was "groovy". Geffen additionally noted that the track "boasts a chorus as catchy as anything since 'The Dope Show' (1998)." Loudwire praised the quality of the song's lyrics, saying that they demonstrate the eponymous vocalists' "infamous ... biting whimsy". The Jakarta Post commended Tyler Bates' production, saying: "The stoner/blues guitars of the sludgy 'Tattooed' find a quixotic partner in the song's high-pitched synths and samples and marching percussion. Manson even growls in that exasperated/theatrical way his old goth self did."

== Release and promotion ==
"Tattooed in Reverse" is the fourth track from Heaven Upside Down to receive a music video, following "We Know Where You Fucking Live", "Kill4Me" and "Say10". The latter two videos co-starred Johnny Depp. The song was serviced to active rock radio formats in the United States on March 6. It went on to peak at number 35 on Billboard's Mainstream Rock Chart, making Heaven Upside Down the band's first studio album since 1998's Mechanical Animals to contain more than one song which appeared that chart, following the number 5 peak of preceding single "Kill4Me". On March 21, the band's vocalist shared a ten-second video on his Twitter account of him being pushed in a wheelchair by Courtney Love, with the caption: "Who allowed Courtney Love to be my nurse? Oh shit...I did." He had been injured six months earlier while performing on-stage at the Hammerstein Ballroom in New York City during the "Heaven Upside Down Tour", when a large stage prop fell on top of him. The incident broke Manson's fibula in two places, which required a plate and ten screws to be inserted into his bone, and resulted in the cancellation of an entire portion of the tour.

== Music video ==
The song's music video was directed by Bill Yukich. It portrays Manson using a wheelchair, with him and model Glo Taylorr as patients in a psychiatric hospital, who are seen receiving various forms of "experimental" medical treatment. Like every other music video created for Heaven Upside Down, it begins with an explicit content warning, informing the observer that "viewer discretion is advised." The video starts with scenes of the character portrayed by Taylorr struggling against nursing staff while lying on an operating table, before she is made unconscious after being connected to an anaesthetic machine. As the video progresses, Taylorr's character becomes "torn between her unconscious state and reality"—her unconscious visions consist of torture, Satanic rituals and "predatory-looking sex". Courtney Love and Lisa Marie Presley both make cameo appearances, portraying nurses.

=== Critical reception ===
The video received generally positive reviews upon release. Joe DiVita of Loudwire said: "Nobody does music videos quite like Marilyn Manson. Throughout his career, his videos have intrigued, confused and disturbed fans, usually relying on an abstract artistic bent, and the clip for 'Tattooed in Reverse' adheres to this ethos." Metal Injection said that "Marilyn Manson has really been stepping up his game with music videos for his latest release, Heaven Upside Down. The budgets make it feel like we're back in the late 90s, when music videos meant something." Similarly, Bianca Gracie of Fuse.tv said the clip would "bring you back to the '90s heyday of Manson's career", elaborating: "Whether you listen to his music or not, you have to give [Manson] credit for consistently releasing cinematic videos that are visually appealing with a heavy dose of insanity."

Several writers noted similarities to the imagery of American television series American Horror Story, including Brad Miska of Bloody Disgusting, who said it was reminiscent of promotional materials created for the series' seventh season, Cult. Gracie of Fuse.tv also went on to say: "If you're a fan of American Horror Story like myself, certain points of 'Tattooed In Reverse' will bring memories of seasons like Asylum and Cult. The hospital scenes are reminiscent of Lana Winters being taken advantage of with electroshock therapy, while the faceless mob scenes are coincidentally similar to Cult's creepy clown sequences. It's a wonder that Ryan Murphy didn't have a hand in creating this video."

NME described it as one of the band's most "unsettling" music videos to date, while Abby Jones of Billboard called it "quintessentially creepy", and said: "The appearance of the Hole singer and the glitchy, grainy visuals elicit a major '90s ambience that recalls memories of Manson's earlier [videos]." A writer for Variety called it "characteristically provocative", while Kerrang! said it was a "brilliantly exhilarating watch". Although Consequence of Sound gave a positive review, they called Love's cameo "brief and a bit forgettable, especially considering everything else that's happening in the video". Conversely, Derrick Rossignol of Uproxx said that Love's cameo was "perhaps the most notable thing about the video", highlighting comments Manson had made previously about the singer. Stereogum was negative, saying the clip was "utterly packed with '90s shock rock clichés" and describing it as Manson "descend[ing] even further into self-parody".

== Credits and personnel ==
Credits adapted from the liner notes of Heaven Upside Down.

Credits

- Recorded at Abattoir Studios, Studio City, California
- Songs of Golgotha (BMI)/Box Cutter Music. (BMI), under exclusive licence to Loma Vista Recordings and Caroline International

Personnel

- Marilyn Manson – vocals
- Tyler Bates – instrumentation, engineering, recording, production, mixing
- Robert Carranza – mixing
- Gil Sharone – drums
- Joanne Higginbottom – assistant engineer
- Brian Lucey – mastering (at Magic Garden Mastering, Los Angeles, California)

== Charts ==
Chart (2018)	Peak position
US Mainstream Rock (Billboard)	35

== Release history ==
Region	Date	Format	Ref.
Worldwide	October 6, 2017	Heaven Upside Down	
United States	March 6, 2018	Active rock airplay	
Worldwide	March 22, 2018	Music video	
