= Arts Center of Cannon County =

Arts center in Woodbury, Tennessee, US

Coordinates: 35.8227°N 86.0925°W

The Arts Center of Cannon County (ACCC) is a 501(c) organization located in Woodbury, Tennessee. The ACCC consists of a playhouse, art gallery, and concert venue in a single facility.

== History and awards ==
The Arts Center is a collaboration between the Cannon Community Playhouse (est. 1980), the Cannon County Historical Society, and the Cannon Association of Craft Artists. The original Arts Center, a 7,000 square-foot facility, opened in March 1991. The facility has undergone multiple expansions and currently occupies 18,000 square feet.

In 1992 the facility received the Tennessee Governor's Award for the Arts in the Community Division.

In 1993 the Arts Center launched its School Matinee program, and in 1995 launched its Summer Youth Conservatory program.

In 1996 and 1998, the 100 Best Small Art Towns in America named the Arts Center as one of the primary reasons for including the town of Woodbury. Also in 1998, the ACCC was selected as one of three hosts for the Tennessee Governor's Conference for the Arts.

In 2002, the Arts Center founded its own in-house record label, Spring Fed Records, and was one of the pilots for the National Endowment for the Arts Local Folk Arts Infrastructure Initiative. In 2003, the ACCC hosted the Southern Arts Federation's Folklorists in the South Conference, and Spring Fed Records' Uncle Dave at Home release was named Old-Time Release of the Year by The Old Time Herald

In 2008, Spring Fed Records' critically acclaimed John Work III: Recording Black Culture, a compilation of recordings made by folklorist John Work III, won the Grammy Award for Best Album Notes.
In 2011, the ACCC received the Tennessee Governor's Award for Environmental Stewardship for the facility's "Power of Art" solar energy installation.

In 2009, the center received a grant to digitize 1000 photos pertaining to the history of agriculture in the county.

== Current Programming ==
=== Education ===
Educational programming at the ACCC focuses primarily on theatrical and musical education for children and youth ages 6–18.
For its School Matinee program, the Arts Center collaborates with schools from Cannon County and surrounding counties with the goal of introducing students to "their first formal art experience". Accc provides teachers with educational materials that prepare students for a theatrical performance at the Arts Center, which is performed by a mix of student and volunteer actors.
The Arts Center also hosts a Summer Youth Conservatory, with two Junior sessions (grades 1-6) and one Senior session (grades 7-12). Each session lasts two weeks, and provides students with classes and workshops in basic and advanced acting techniques, creative movement, vocal training and musical training, and each session ends with a performance by the students.

=== Cultural Arts ===
The ACCC showcases art by local and rural artists through annual events and museum and gallery exhibitions.

==== Crafts ====
The Arts Center coordinates and hosts the annual White Oak Craft Fair (est. 1990) in Woodbury, Tennessee, which awards prizes for artisanal work in traditional crafts such as carpentry, pottery, metalwork, glasswork, and basketry. The Craft Fair also features textile and fabric works, handmade jewelry, woodworking, and photography.

The ACCC facility includes a craft store which sells works by local artisans year round, and is a part of the Cumberland Crafts Trail.

==== Gallery ====
The Arts Center's Marley Berger Gallery holds six shows per year, with a focus on traditional works and works relating and/or significant to the local culture. The gallery features shows of local artists curated by the Arts Center as well as travelling shows.

=== Performing Arts ===
The Wilma Adams Theater at the Arts Center holds public performances of six shows per year, and three children's shows per year for school groups, including established plays and musicals as well as works by local and lesser-known playwrights. The Theater also hosts concerts by local and touring performers of folk, bluegrass, blues, jazz music, and tribute bands. Past performances at the Arts Center include Doyle Lawson & Quicksilver, Nnenna Freelon, Dr. Ralph Stanley, The Fairfield Four, Fisk Jubilee Singers, and Leon Redbone.

== Spring Fed Records ==
Begun in 2002, Spring Fed Records is the Arts Center's in-house record label, which focuses primarily on anthologies and re-issues of traditional bluegrass, country, folk, gospel, and blues recording. SFR's John Work III: Recording Black Culture, a compilation of recordings made by folklorist John Work III, won the Grammy Award for Best Album Notes. In 2010, SFR began recording local working artists in the folk and bluegrass genres. Springfed Records is now owned by Middle Tennessee State University.
