= We Know Where You Fucking Live =

Single by Marilyn Manson

from the album Heaven Upside Down
- Released: September 11, 2017
- Genre: Industrial rock
- Length: 4:32
- Label: Loma Vista
- Songwriters: Marilyn Manson; Tyler Bates
- Producer: Bates

Marilyn Manson singles chronology
"Cupid Carries a Gun" (2015)	"We Know Where You Fucking Live" (2017)	"Kill4Me" (2017)

Music video
- "We Know Where You Fucking Live" on YouTube

"We Know Where You Fucking Live" (stylized in all caps) is a song by American rock band Marilyn Manson. It was released on September 11, 2017 as the lead single from their tenth studio album, Heaven Upside Down (2017).

== Composition and style ==
Well that song I'm not sure where the beginning of it came from. I think it was more about the idea that people have this anonymity on the internet and, you know, a lot of people think it's political but I think it was more about people saying things that they think they can get away with and me being someone who was affiliated—let's not say affiliated—someone who is friendly with very dangerous people and saying, "Well you know what? Freedom of Speech does not come with a dental plan. So say what you want but we know where you fucking live."

— Marilyn Manson, In Conversation with NME

"We Know Where You Fucking Live" is an industrial rock song, and was the first song recorded by Marilyn Manson and Tyler Bates for Heaven Upside Down. Bates later said: "When Manson and I began to speak again about making a new album, I told him 'If we're doing this again, we're gonna make a completely different record [from The Pale Emperor]. You gotta bring the fire! We gotta fuck some shit up!'. He was, of course, all in for it." The song was composed by Bates just several hours before the pair's first recording session, with Bates calling it a "a great starter for the album. I knew that track was the initial seed that I wanted to plant for him to work from."

It is reminiscent of material released by the band in the late '90s, and features subdued, predominantly electronic verses coupled with a chorus consisting of loud, aggressive guitar riffs and the eponymous vocalists' screamed vocals. Nerdist Industries called the song "fiercely rocking and in-your-face". Manson said that he was "astonished that a record label put [the song] out as the first single", due to its lyrical content, which reference political corruption, drone warfare and global surveillance. The track was debuted live during the first date of the Heaven Upside Down Tour, which occurred on July 20 in Budapest.

== Release and promotion ==
Prior to its release, the song was advertised with a series of fly poster campaigns at various music festivals throughout Europe, including the Reading and Leeds Festivals. These campaigns were financed by Loma Vista Recordings. The song premiered on Zane Lowe's Beats 1 show on September 11, immediately after which it was made available via streaming platforms.

== Music video ==
The music video for the song was directed by Bill Yukich and Perou, and was posted onto YouTube on September 15. The clip opens with a parental advisory warning for graphic violence and sexual content, and begins with a quintet of nuns walking down a suburban street during a solar eclipse. The nuns tear off their habits, revealing them to be wearing latex undergarments and leather dominatrix gear, and carrying various handguns, assault rifles and rocket launchers. The group then encounters Manson and, after an initial standoff, proceed to blow up a van. The group then invades the home of a family, and subjects the husband and wife to a violent sexual assault. Sydney Gore of The Fader has hypothesized that the video is a metaphor for religious extremism.

== Credits and personnel ==
Credits adapted from the liner notes of Heaven Upside Down.

Credits

- Recorded at Abattoir Studios, Studio City, California
- Songs of Golgotha (BMI)/Box Cutter Music. (BMI), under exclusive license to Loma Vista Recordings and Caroline International

Personnel

- Marilyn Manson – vocals
- Tyler Bates – instrumentation, engineering, recording, production, mixing
- Robert Carranza – mixing
- Gil Sharone – drums
- Joanne Higginbottom – assistant engineer
- Brian Lucey – mastering (at Magic Garden Mastering, Los Angeles, California)

== Charts ==
Chart (2017)	Peak position
German Alternative Singles Chart (Deutsche Alternative Charts)	4
US Hot Rock & Alternative Songs (Billboard)	41
US Hard Rock Digital Songs (Billboard)	5
