= Heaven Upside Down =

Studio album by Marilyn Manson
- Released: October 6, 2017
- Studios: Abattoir Studios, Studio City, California
- Genres: Industrial metal; glam rock; gothic rock
- Length: 47:29
- Labels: Loma Vista; Caroline
- Producer: Tyler Bates

Marilyn Manson chronology
The Pale Emperor (2015)	Heaven Upside Down (2017)	We Are Chaos (2020)

Singles from Heaven Upside Down
- 1. "We Know Where You Fucking Live" Released: September 11, 2017; 2. "Kill4Me" Released: September 20, 2017

Heaven Upside Down is the tenth studio album by American rock band Marilyn Manson. It was released on October 6, 2017, by Loma Vista Recordings and Caroline International. The record had the working title Say10 and was initially due to be issued on Valentine's Day. However, the release was delayed by numerous events, most notably the death of Marilyn Manson's father, Hugh Warner, who died during production and to whom the album was later dedicated. The record has many of the musicians who performed on the band's previous album, The Pale Emperor (2015), including the producer Tyler Bates and the drummer Gil Sharone. Despite Manson's early implications, long-time bass guitarist Twiggy Ramirez did not participate on the album. He left the group following a sexual assault allegation by a former girlfriend.

"We Know Where You Fucking Live" was released as a single in September, shortly followed by "Kill4Me", which became the band's highest-peaking entry on Billboard's Mainstream Rock Chart. The music videos for the album had celebrities including Johnny Depp, Courtney Love and Lisa Marie Presley. The single "Tattooed in Reverse" also entered the mainstream rock chart, making Heaven Upside Down the band's first album since Mechanical Animals in 1998 to chart more than one song there.

The album received positive reviews from music critics upon release, with several publications saying it continued a creative resurgence that began with the previous album. It was also a commercial success, debuting at number eight on the Billboard 200 and charting in the top ten in most of the major markets. In Australia, it was the band's highest-charting album since Mechanical Animals, and its first top 10 studio album in the United Kingdom since The Golden Age of Grotesque in 2003.

Manson suffered several injuries that delayed the Heaven Upside Down Tour. The band embarked on two co-headlining tours with Rob Zombie: Twins of Evil: The Second Coming Tour and Twins of Evil: Hell Never Dies Tour. To promote the former, the two bands collaborated on a cover version of The Beatles song "Helter Skelter". Manson issued three other cover versions on soundtracks during the album's promotional cycle: "Stigmata", "God's Gonna Cut You Down" and "Cry Little Sister".

== Background and recording ==
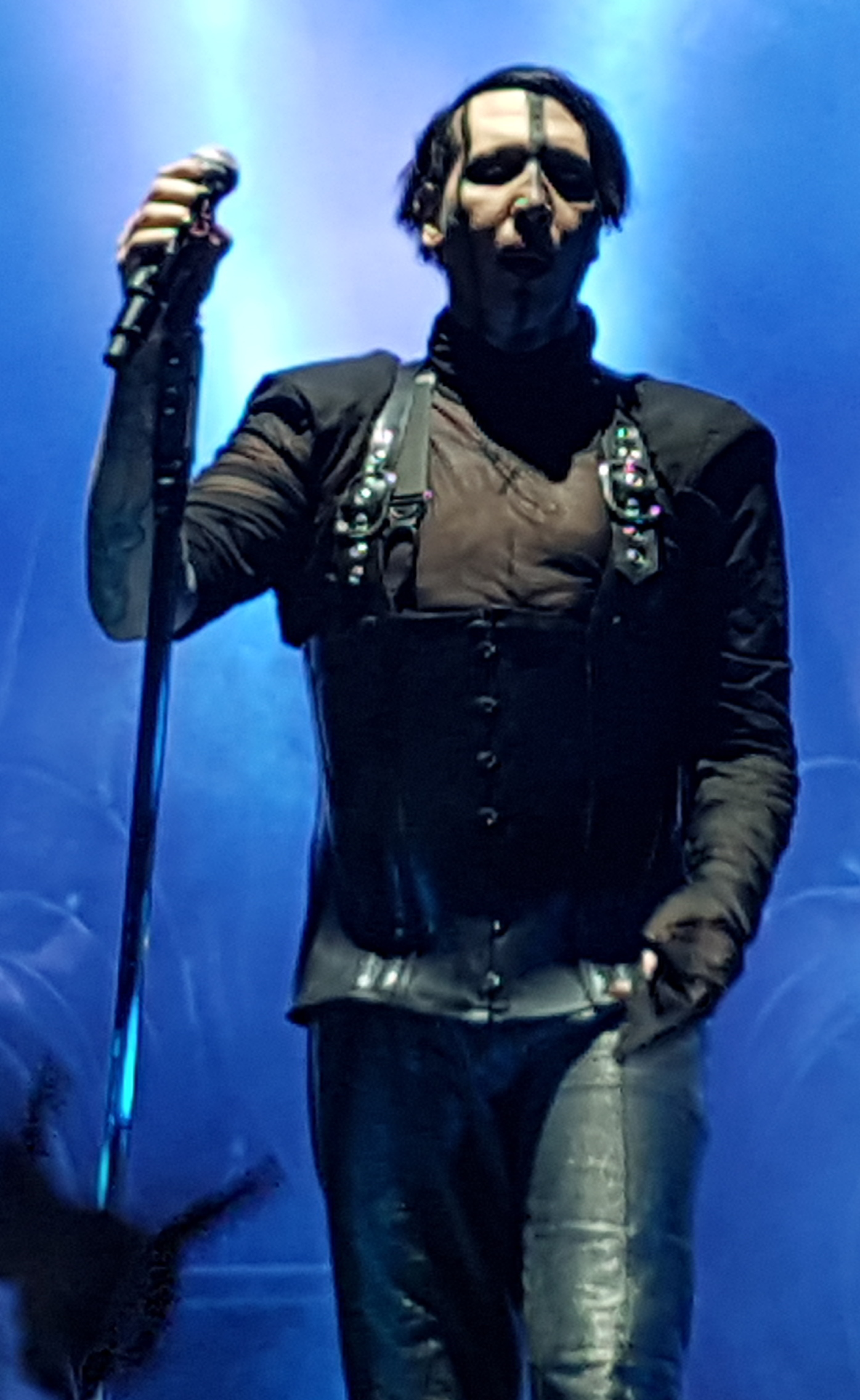
Marilyn Manson performing at Stage AE in Pittsburgh on September 29, 2017

Marilyn Manson met Tyler Bates, the score composer of the TV series Californication, while playing a fictionalized version of himself in the season finale of the sixth season of the series. The two then collaborated on the band's ninth studio album, the blues-influenced The Pale Emperor (2015), which was described by numerous publications as the best album the band had released in over a decade. In July 2016, Manson received the 'Icon Award' at the APMAs, where he revealed several details about the follow-up, such as its working title of Say10 and a tentative Valentine's Day release date. He explained that the title originated from a note written in one of his workbooks from his time as a student at GlenOak High School. Manson doubted whether Bates would collaborate with him again following The Pale Emperor, saying relations between the pair deteriorated to such an extent during the supporting The Hell Not Hallelujah Tour that Manson threatened Bates on-stage with a box-cutter knife.

During the tour, Manson regularly shattered glass bottles on-stage so he could cut himself. Bates, who recently announced his leaving the tour to pursue other projects, an announcement that he said saddened Manson, confronted the vocalist during a concert when he realized the shards of glass were hitting drummer Gil Sharone. Manson responded by threatening Bates with a box-cutter, to which Bates replied "You fucking come near me and I'll kill you with that box cutter". Despite the confrontation, Bates agreed to work with the band, and renamed his music publishing company Box Cutter Music in honor of the incident.

On May 8, 2017, Manson announced the album had been renamed Heaven Upside Down, and said recording had been completed. He elaborated on the meaning of the new title: "I was going to call the record SAY10, but I didn't feel that that defined the album. I had the lyrics written for the song 'Heaven Upside Down', and I thought that defined the record more so because of the idea of time as a flat circle, constellations being defined by the negative space—the blackness; the idea of looking at something from an opposite point of view."

As was the case with The Pale Emperor, Manson and Bates worked on the record while the latter was composing score material for the American television series Salem; the third season of which featured Manson as a recurring cast member. Parts of the album were recorded in Louisiana, where he was filming scenes for the series. The record was produced solely by Bates, and recorded at Bates's Studio City recording facility Abattoir Studios, with live drums recorded by The Pale Emperor contributor Gil Sharone. Despite initially suggesting that longtime bassist Twiggy would contribute to the writing and production of the album, Manson later confirmed that he was invited but did not participate during sessions at Bates's recording studio. According to Manson, after listening to pre-recorded basslines performed by Bates, Twiggy responded by saying he would be unable to "play them any better, and that the record sounded great [as it was]".

Manson and Bates largely improvised during their writing sessions. Bates said that songs were created "out of a conversation, essentially, just between [Manson] and I, and we make it pretty much on the spot. It's me making music right from my head, and the lyrics are developed by Manson right there in the studio with me." Manson described the collaborative process between the two as being "a very intimate, personal experience. ... We sit across from each other, with headphones on, we look each other in the eye when we're writing." Manson opted not to record his vocals from inside a vocal booth, instead recording them while sitting at Bates's mixing console; the majority of vocals on the album were recorded in single takes, with minimal overdubbing. Bates sought to incorporate the intensity of the band's live performances into the album's production, describing the record as "intense, fun and violent. It's more immediate than The Pale Emperor, much more aggressive, and definitely much more imbued with Manson's fucked-up humor." He also said:

I wanted the album to be a platform for Manson to return to journalism, and write about the stuff we talk about, which is the sickness and passivity that is permeating the annals of society. Terrorism, mass shootings, reluctance to change, abandonment, dogma, apathy, judgment—all of this is pervasive in shaping our daily life's experience. The music is imbued with frustration, sadness, and anger about all of this, and to explore this landscape effectively, the sounds and the riffs needed to be more cutting and abrasive than The Pale Emperor. Heaven Upside Down is comprised of the music we love. Goth and Industrial. King-size guitar riffs. Sex. Equal parts 'fuck you' and jagged humor. Act II.

— Tyler Bates, in an interview with Pop Disciple.

== Composition and style ==
"Two decades on and ten albums down, Manson remains the same icon in a different realm, one that he's warned us about his whole career. 2017 is heaven upside down: a nightmarish, capitalist landscape of broken promises that we're constantly reassured is what we asked for. A world of uncertainty, with endless possibility sitting alongside ever-growing restriction, reality TV becoming reality... becoming president. 'I'm not a ghost', Manson screams on the album's title track. And isn't that what we're all worried about right now—that we're either invisible, or nearly dead?"

— Dazed writer Thomas Gorton on the underlying concept behind Heaven Upside Down.

Manson initially described Say10 as being a musical departure from The Pale Emperor, saying it was "pretty violent in its nature for some reason, and it's not emotional in the same way. It's got a chip on its shoulder." He called it "by far the most thematic and over-complicated thing that I've done", and indicated it would contain some of his most politically-charged lyrics, but denied the political lyrical content related to the election of Donald Trump by saying most of its lyrics were written before the 2016 US presidential election. He said he would not be voting in that election, and believed that – as an artist – he could make more of a difference with his music than with a vote.

Manson dubbed Heaven Upside Down his "most precise and well-thought-out work", and compared its lyrics to those of Holy Wood (In the Shadow of the Valley of Death) (2000), noting the majority of lyrics on both records were initially written as prose. He additionally described it as a concept album, and contrasted it with The Pale Emperor: "The last album was Faust, Mephistopheles. For me, this would be Pilgrim's Progress". Lyrical themes and subject matter on the record range from politics, violence, sex and romance, chaos and isolation, and capitalism, religion, drugs, paranoia, fear and mental illness. Manson characterized Heaven Upside Down as a hard rock and punk rock album, in the vein of Killing Joke, Joy Division, Bauhaus, and David Bowie's Scary Monsters (and Super Creeps). Reviewers have additionally defined it as an industrial metal, glam rock and gothic rock record.

The title of opening track "Revelation #12" is a reference to both the Book of Revelation and the Beatles song "Revolution 9". "We Know Where You Fucking Live" was the first song Manson and Bates recorded for the album; its lyrics reference state surveillance and drone warfare. "Saturnalia" was the final song written for the album. Manson described its lyrics as being "the real heart of the record." He was unaware of the severity of his father's terminal illness until two days before he died, on July 7, 2017, the same day the band finished recording "Saturnalia". Its lyrics contain numerous astrological and mythological references, specifically the astrological transit of Saturn – Saturn return – and the myth of Saturnus devouring his children. Manson conflated his father's death with the lyrical content: "Seeing my father dying, I felt like that was the circle of life that he'd want me to put the energy of death into rebirth, you know, the snake eating its own tail, Saturnalia, Saturninus, that whole concept." "Je$u$ Cri$i$" was described by Manson as "my résumé ... It's basically something I would say with a [sarcastic] shrug when someone asked me, 'What do you do?' 'Well, I write songs to fight and fuck to'."

== Release and artwork ==
The album was not released on Valentine's Day, prompting increasingly aggressive responses from fans on social media platforms. Manson later explained several factors caused the delay, including Bates' schedule scoring films, Manson being unhappy with the quality of the record by that date, as well as the death of his father, to whom Heaven Upside Down is dedicated. Bates also said recording was delayed due to the band's touring schedule; the pair had completed just six songs before beginning a co-headlining tour with Slipknot in the summer of 2016. At least three tracks were recorded sometime after Valentine's Day: "Revelation #12", "Saturnalia" and "Heaven Upside Down", with the album's name then being changed to the last song title.

Prior to the record's eventual release, Manson posted a series of horror-themed videos on Instagram. The first of these was captioned "6:19. The time has come." Numerous publications hypothesized whether 6:19 referred to a June 19 release date, a Bible verse, or the Eat Me, Drink Me track "If I Was Your Vampire", which features the lyric "6:19 and I know I'm ready". The final video featured the Celebritarian Cross, an inverted variation on the Cross of Lorraine that had previously been used by Manson as a logo for his Celebritarian art movement in 2005; the symbol subsequently appeared on the Heaven Upside Down album cover.

Heaven Upside Down was released worldwide on October 6, 2017, by Loma Vista Recordings in the United States, Caroline International internationally, and in Japan by Loma Vista in cooperation with Hostess Entertainment; Japanese editions contain a Mystery Skulls remix of "Kill4Me" as a bonus track. The booklet was printed on Bible paper, with the lyrics formatted to resemble biblical text. The record was mastered by Brian Lucey, the engineer who masters the majority of Bates's soundtrack work. According to Manson, Lucey was chosen because the album contains "some extreme experiments with sound. We were very particular in not allowing someone else to master it, who might accidentally eliminate them. We've got some very intense, alchemical, scientific, binaural sounds that sometimes even make me have a panic attack while I'm listening to it." These sounds are most prevalent in the title track and "Saturnalia", which Manson highlighted as centerpieces of the record.

== Promotion and singles ==
"In an era where mass shootings have become a nearly daily occurrence, this was an act of theater in an attempt to make a statement about how easily accessible semi-automatic weapons are, and how seeing them has become normalized. My performance was not meant to be disrespectful or show any insensitivity. ... My art has always been a reaction to popular culture, and my way to make people think about the horrible things that happen in this world. My empathy goes out to anyone who has been affected by the irresponsible and reprehensible misuse of real guns."

— Manson's statement in response to criticism made after his use of a replica assault rifle as a microphone during a concert.

The band initially included Manson on vocals with Bates and Paul Wiley on electric guitars, Twiggy on bass and Sharone on drums. They began the first leg of the Heaven Upside Down Tour on July 20, 2017, in Budapest, during which they debuted several new songs. During this leg of the tour, the group narrowly avoided injury in Moscow when their tour bus was involved in a collision with a semi-trailer truck, and Manson caused controversy in Eastern Europe when he referenced the ongoing Russo-Ukrainian War during a concert in Kyiv, saying: "You just made Moscow sound like your bitch." The band performed in Moscow two days prior to the Kyiv concert.

The North American leg began on September 27, and was scheduled to incorporate performances at several music festivals, including the Aftershock Festival on October 22, at which Nine Inch Nails was also scheduled to appear. Manson indicated a possibility of joining that band on stage during the festival, after he and Trent Reznor mended a longstanding feud. However, Manson was injured on several occasions during the tour. He sprained his left ankle after jumping off the stage at Pittsburgh's Stage AE on September 29. The following night, at the Hammerstein Ballroom in New York, he was crushed by a large stage prop, and lay unconscious on the stage for up to 15 minutes before being carried out of the venue on a stretcher to a nearby hospital. Manson had broken his fibula in two places, requiring a plate and ten screws to be inserted into his bone. The rest of the tour was then canceled, including their appearance at Aftershock, with all dates – excluding festival appearances – rescheduled to take place at the start of 2018.

On October 25, Manson announced he had "decided to part ways" with Twiggy after the bassist was accused of sexual assault by former girlfriend Jessicka Addams, who was the vocalist for alternative rock band Jack Off Jill. Addams said the incident occurred while she and Twiggy were a couple in the mid-90s. He was replaced on subsequent tour dates by former Racer X and the Mars Volta bassist Juan Alderete. Alderete's first show with the band, at the 2017 Ozzfest Meets Knotfest festival in San Bernardino on November 5, found Manson performing in a wheelchair as a result of injuries he sustained earlier in the tour. Manson attracted criticism from some publications after he used a replica assault rifle as a microphone during the concert, with some commentators arguing it was insensitive considering the city had previously been the subject of a terrorism-related attack, and that the concert took place hours after the Sutherland Springs church shooting in Texas.

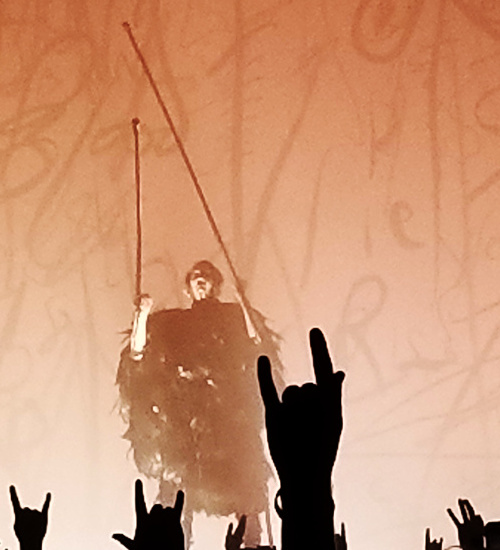
Manson performing at the Hammerstein Ballroom; he sustained injuries during this show that resulted in the rescheduling of an entire leg of the "Heaven Upside Down Tour".

The day of the 2016 US presidential election, a short teaser clip for "Say10" was released. Created by director Tyler Shields, it featured images of Manson holding a bloodstained knife while standing above a decapitated corpse lying in a pool of blood. Numerous publications noted the corpse was dressed in similar clothing to the kind regularly worn by Donald Trump—a suit and red tie. Manson would later say the decapitated figure in the video "wasn't anyone except if you wanted it to be them." A cover of Ministry's "Stigmata" was released on July 28, 2017, when it appeared on the soundtrack to Atomic Blonde. "We Know Where You Fucking Live" was issued as the album's lead single on September 11, after premiering on Zane Lowe's Beats 1 show. Its music video was posted onto YouTube four days later, and was directed by Bill Yukich and Perou. "Kill4Me" was issued as the album's primary airplay single in the United States, where it went on to become their highest peaking single ever on the Billboard Mainstream Rock Chart. A series of advertisements created by Canadian pop artist Alex Kazemi to promote the album on Instagram were leaked online in late September, but were deemed too graphic to be used on the image hosting service. Music videos were subsequently released for "Say10" and "Kill4Me", both directed by Yukich and featured actor Johnny Depp.

A cover of "God's Gonna Cut You Down" – recorded during the Heaven Upside Down sessions – was released on December 8 when it featured on the soundtrack to 24 Hours to Live. "Tattooed in Reverse" was serviced to active rock radio formats in the United States as a promotional single on March 6, 2018, and peaked at number 35 on Billboard's Mainstream Rock Chart. This made Heaven Upside Down the band's first studio album since 1998's Mechanical Animals to contain more than one charting song on Mainstream Rock. The song's music video was directed by Yukich, and featured singers Courtney Love and Lisa Marie Presley. Yukich also directed the music video for the band's cover version of Gerard McMahon's "Cry Little Sister", released in June and recorded for the soundtrack of The New Mutants.

The band embarked on a second co-headlining tour with Rob Zombie on July 11, 2018, titled "Twins of Evil: The Second Coming Tour", following the "Twins of Evil Tour" in 2012. On the day the tour began, Zombie and Manson released their cover of the Beatles track "Helter Skelter", which featured former Manson band members John 5 and Ginger Fish. Heaven Upside Down was the last album to feature Sharone, who departed the band in March 2019. He was replaced on the subsequent "Twins of Evil: Hell Never Dies Tour" by former Black Flag and Ho99o9 drummer Brandon Pertzborn. Shortly after the tour completed, Alderete was involved in a bicycle accident which left him with a diffuse axonal injury, a type of traumatic brain injury. A GoFundMe page was created to help cover the cost of his medical expenses. Despite this, Alderete is a credited performer on the band's next studio album, 2020's We Are Chaos.

== Critical reception ==
Professional ratings
Aggregate scores
Source	Rating
AnyDecentMusic?	6.2/10
Metacritic	71/100
Review scores
Source	Rating
AllMusic	4.5/5 stars
Alternative Press	4/5 stars
The Boston Globe	4/5 stars
Clash	8/10
Classic Rock	3.5/5 stars
Consequence of Sound	B
Drowned in Sound	6/10
NME	3/5 stars
Pitchfork	5.9/10
Rolling Stone	3/5 stars

Heaven Upside Down was well received by music critics upon release. Several publications said it continued a creative resurgence that began with their previous release, including AllMusic, which described it as a more satisfying album than the predecessor. This sentiment was echoed by both Loudwire and The Boston Globe, the latter of which said: "No one expected this band to be doing some of its best work 20 years after it first shook up the zeitgeist, but here it is, continuing to evolve while toning down its more dated or cartoonish aspects. It just goes to show that a good album beats a good scandal every time." Bloody Disgusting said it was their best release since Holy Wood (In the Shadow of the Valley of Death), and Loudwire included it on their list of the best hard rock albums of 2017. Consequence of Sound commented on Manson's stage injury: "Had the worst happened, Heaven Upside Down is the kind of career-defining record that [he] just might want to leave as his last great opus anyway."

Numerous publications lauded it for being a solid and concise album. Clash commended the quality of songwriting, complimenting the band for mixing various styles from their discography while saying the record fused three distinct genres from their previous work—the industrial of Antichrist Superstar, the glam rock of Mechanical Animals, and the blues of The Pale Emperor. Classic Rock's sister publication Metal Hammer described it as a solid album and said it illustrates how Manson can "still do what he got famous [for] doing: write biting, anti-establishment goth rock full of dark, playful imagery." Singapore's The Straits Times dubbed it the album of the week and described it as an exhilarating recorded.

Critics praised the quality of lyricism found on the album, specifically in light of the presidential election of Donald Trump. ABC News said it saw Manson going back to basics, which they described as him "playing overtly with taboos and openly baiting his critics." The Evening Standard said the lyrical content may prove cathartic for people disillusioned with the election. The List made a similar point while comparing its lyrical content to Grand Guignol, a term used to describe graphic, amoral horror entertainment. Mark Beaumont of Classic Rock called it an astute album, saying the band "update and renovate the goth-glam dazzle of Mechanical Animals and Antichrist Superstar to better ram home [Manson's] top-line points: that religion is a pointless poison, politicians are society's true Satans and that fighting and fucking are the only reasoned responses to the current countdown to the Book of Revelations [sic] apocalypse that the world has chosen democratically for itself."

The album received some mixed reviews as well, with several writers criticizing the lyrics to "Je$u$ Cri$i$". Spin criticized the "reprehensible" violent lyrical content found on the record, in light of the 2017 Las Vegas shooting. Conversely, Pitchfork said the lyrics were ineffectual, arguing they were easily eclipsed by the horror found in real life. Both Crack Magazine and PopMatters complimented the inclusion of punk elements, which the latter said helped the album match the intensity of the band's earlier work, but they were both critical of the lyrics. NME argued the record was too similar to the band's earlier work, and complained most of the songs lacked innovation. Drowned in Sound said that fans were "unlikely to see the power or the passion of Manson's classic run again – it's very difficult to bottle lightning twice ... That said, [Manson] seems to have settled after many years of free-fall. In Tyler Bates he has found a collaborator who knows how to get the best from his twisted mind. It's business as usual, but after a decade of disappointment, it's good to know business is doing well."

== Commercial performance ==
Heaven Upside Down debuted at number eight on the Billboard 200 with 35,000 album-equivalent units, 32,000 of which were pure album sales, making it the band's seventh consecutive top ten album on the chart. Industry forecasters had predicted it was on course to debut in the top ten with sales of between 25,000 and 32,000 copies. It was the band's fourth consecutive number one album on Billboard's Top Hard Rock Albums, and their first to reach number one on Top Alternative Albums. It also debuted at number two on both Top Rock Albums and Top Album Sales, which acts as the current equivalent of the previous Billboard 200, before it was reconfigured to incorporate album-equivalent units. In Canada, Heaven Upside Down matched the peak of The Pale Emperor by debuting at number four.

The record was predicted to enter the top ten of the UK Albums Chart, making it their first top ten album there since Eat Me, Drink Me peaked at number eight a decade earlier. The album debuted at number seven with first-week sales of 6,636 copies—their highest opening week figure since The High End of Low debuted with 7,746 copies in 2009 and their highest-charting studio album since The Golden Age of Grotesque peaked at number four in 2003. The record went on to peak in the top ten of multiple European markets, including Austria, the Czech Republic, Finland, Germany, Greece, Slovakia, and Switzerland. It peaked at number six in Spain, making it their highest-charting album there since The Golden Age of Grotesque peaked at number five. In France, Heaven Upside Down debuted with sales of 4,745 copies.

Heaven Upside Down entered the ARIA Charts at number four, making it their sixth top ten album in Australia, and their highest-charting since Mechanical Animals reached number one in 1998. It entered at number six on the Official New Zealand Music Chart, their fifth top ten studio album there. On the Japanese Oricon chart, the album debuted at number 29 with first week sales of 1,805 copies.

== Track listing ==
All lyrics are written by Marilyn Manson; all music is composed by Tyler Bates.

No.	Title	Length
1.	"Revelation #12"	4:42
2.	"Tattooed in Reverse"	4:24
3.	"We Know Where You Fucking Live"	4:32
4.	"Say10"	4:18
5.	"Kill4Me"	3:59
6.	"Saturnalia"	7:59
7.	"Jesus Crisis"	3:59
8.	"Blood Honey"	4:10
9.	"Heaven Upside Down"	4:49
10.	"Threats of Romance"	4:37
Total length:		47:29

Heaven Upside Down – Japanese edition bonus track
No.	Title	Length
11.	"Kill4Me" (Mystery Skulls Remix)	3:39
Total length:		51:08

Notes

- "We Know Where You Fucking Live", "Say10" and "Kill4Me" are stylized in all caps; "Jesus Crisis" is stylized as "JE$U$ CRI$I$".
- "Saturnalia" is 6:22 on the vinyl edition.

== Personnel ==
Credits adapted from the liner notes of Heaven Upside Down.

- Marilyn Manson – vocals
- Tyler Bates – guitars, bass, keyboards, programming, engineering, recording, production, mixing
- Gil Sharone – drums
- Dana Dentata – backing vocals (track 9)
- Roger Joseph Manning Jr. – clavinet (track 10)
- Robert Carranza – mixing
- Joanne Higginbottom – assistant engineer
- Olivia Jaffe – hexagram sigil
- Brian Lucey – mastering
- Perou – photography
- Brian Roettinger – art direction

== Charts ==
=== Weekly charts ===
Chart (2017)	Peak position
Australian Albums (ARIA)	4
Austrian Albums (Ö3 Austria)	4
Belgian Albums (Ultratop Flanders)	20
Belgian Albums (Ultratop Wallonia)	12
Canadian Albums (Billboard)	4
Czech Albums (ČNS IFPI)	3
Danish Vinyl Albums (Hitlisten)	3
Dutch Albums (Dutch Charts)	28
Finnish Albums (Suomen virallinen lista)	8
French Albums (SNÉP)	15
German Albums (Offizielle Top 100)	9
Greek Albums (IFPI Greece)	10
Hungarian Albums (MAHASZ)	18
Irish Albums (IRMA)	35
Italian Albums (FIMI)	14
Japanese Albums (Oricon)	29
Japanese International Albums (Oricon)	8
New Zealand Albums (RMNZ)	6
Polish Albums (ZPAV)	18
Portuguese Albums (AFP)	20
Scottish Albums (OCC)	5
Slovak Albums (ČNS IFPI)	10
Spanish Albums (Promúsicae)	6
Swedish Albums (Sverigetopplistan)	14
Swiss Albums (Swiss Hitparade)	3
UK Albums (OCC)	7
UK Rock & Metal Albums (OCC)	2
US Billboard 200	8
US Top Album Sales (Billboard)	2
US Top Rock Albums (Billboard)	2
US Top Alternative Albums (Billboard)	1
US Top Hard Rock Albums (Billboard)	1

=== Year-end charts ===
Chart (2017)	Position
Belgian Albums (Ultratop Wallonia)	171
US Top Hard Rock Albums (Billboard)	36
US Top Rock Albums (Billboard)	89
US Top Current Album Sales (Billboard)	198
