= Kill4Me =

Single by Marilyn Manson

from the album Heaven Upside Down
- Released: September 20, 2017
- Genre: Industrial rock; electropop
- Length: 3:59
- Label: Loma Vista
- Songwriters: Marilyn Manson; Tyler Bates
- Producer: Bates

Marilyn Manson singles chronology
"We Know Where You Fucking Live" (2017)	"Kill4Me" (2017)	"Cry Little Sister" (2018)

"Kill4Me" (stylized in all caps) is a song by American rock band Marilyn Manson. It was released as the second single from their tenth studio album, Heaven Upside Down (2017). It was released on streaming platforms and as an immediate download with pre-orders of the album on music download services such as iTunes and Amazon Music on September 20, 2017. The song's official music video was released on November 13, and was the second video from the album to feature Johnny Depp, following "Say10".

== Composition and style ==
"Kill4Me" is an industrial rock song, with Vice writer Phil Witmer calling it the "latest in the Manson tradition of swinging, toothy industrial rockers", before comparing it to several of the band's previous singles, such as "Disposable Teens" and "The Dope Show". Diffuser.fm said the track "evokes Manson's Antichrist Superstar era, and the song's lyrical themes don't suggest for a moment that the one-time bête noire of Capitol Hill has undergone a softening of heart." Kory Grow of Rolling Stone also compared it with Antichrist Superstar, while noting the presence of "throbbing synths and a disco beat". Graham Hartmann of Loudwire said the track was inspired by '80s new wave music, and contrasted it with the band's previous single "We Know Where You Fucking Live", writing: "While 'We Know Where You Fucking Live' went for the full-on aggression of Manson's classic sound, 'Kill4Me' is much more in the vein of his 2010s material."

== Release and promotion ==
The track was released as the lead airplay single from Heaven Upside Down in the United States, where it was serviced to active rock radio formats during the chart week beginning September 26. It debuted at number 47, before rising to number 24 the following week, becoming the "greatest gainer" on the chart. The song has also appeared on a number of Billboard component charts, such as Mainstream Rock and Hot Rock Songs, peaking at numbers 5 (the band's first top five single on that chart) and 39, respectively. The song's music video was uploaded to the band's YouTube on November 13. It was directed by Bill Yukich, and features actor Johnny Depp and models Jocelyn Binder and Bailee Cowperthwaite.

== Credits and personnel ==
Credits adapted from the liner notes of Heaven Upside Down.

Credits

- Recorded at Abattoir Studios, Studio City, California
- Songs of Golgotha (BMI)/Box Cutter Music. (BMI), under exclusive licence to Loma Vista Recordings and Caroline International

Personnel

- Marilyn Manson – vocals
- Tyler Bates – instrumentation, engineering, recording, production, mixing
- Robert Carranza – mixing
- Joanne Higginbottom – assistant engineer
- Brian Lucey – mastering (at Magic Garden Mastering, Los Angeles, California)

== Charts ==
Chart (2017)	Peak position
Canada Rock (Billboard)	40
Finland Airplay (Radiosoittolista)	100
Mexican English Airplay (Billboard)	34
US Mainstream Rock (Billboard)	5
US Hot Rock & Alternative Songs (Billboard)	34
US Rock & Alternative Airplay (Billboard)	22
