= Say10 =

Song by Marilyn Manson

from the album Heaven Upside Down
- Released: October 6, 2017
- Genre: Industrial metal
- Length: 4:18
- Label: Loma Vista
- Songwriters: Marilyn Manson; Tyler Bates
- Producer: Bates

Music video
- "Say10" on YouTube

"Say10" (stylized in all caps) is a song by American rock band Marilyn Manson. It is the fourth track from their tenth studio album, Heaven Upside Down (2017). The song's title was first revealed in July 2016, when Marilyn Manson announced it as the working title for the then-upcoming studio album. A teaser video of the song was released on the same day as the 2016 US presidential election, and features the vocalist brandishing a bloodstained knife while standing over a decapitated corpse, which was widely reported to represent Donald Trump. Its official music video was released on October 9, 2017 and features Johnny Depp.

== Composition and style ==
In July 2016, during an interview with Ryan J. Downey at the APMAs, Marilyn Manson revealed "Say10" to be the title track of the band's then-forthcoming tenth studio album. Eleanor Goodman from Metal Hammer described the track as a "big, snarling anthem that seems purpose-built for stages", while Gigwise said it was reminiscent of material found on Mechanical Animals. Greg Kennelty of Metal Injection commended Manson and Tyler Bates' use of dynamics on the song, writing that each musician – through their respective vocals and production – throw "punches only when [they] need to. Why waste all your energy going full force when there's a more subtle and effective tactic of getting what you want? After all, you rarely need aggression when aiming straight for the jugular."

== Release and promotion ==
On the day of the 2016 US presidential election – November 8 – Manson released a short teaser video for the song via The Daily Beast. The video was created by Final Girl director Tyler Shields. It featured images of the vocalist tearing pages out of a Bible and brandishing a bloodstained knife while standing over a decapitated corpse lying in a pool of blood. Numerous publications noted that the corpse was dressed in attire similar to the kind regularly worn by Donald Trump—a suit and red tie. Manson later dismissed these connections, saying: "Well, there was no actual decapitation shown. It was implied. And no Trump. There was just a guy in a red tie. Could have been a preacher. It's funny that people see what they want to see." Despite this, Aaron Klein alleged in an article which appeared on the far-right organization Breitbart News, that the head of the decapitated corpse which appeared in "Say10" was later used by Shields in another project: a controversial photo-shoot featuring comedian Kathy Griffin, which saw her holding a ketchup-covered Styrofoam replica of Trump's severed head.

== Music video ==
A full version of Shields' teaser video has never been released. The official music video for the song was directed by Bill Yukich, and was uploaded onto YouTube shortly after the release of Heaven Upside Down. This video co-stars Johnny Depp, with Depp and Manson portraying Cain and Abel, respectively. The video was inspired by horror films such as The Exorcist (1973), The Evil Dead (1981) and A Nightmare on Elm Street (1984), the latter of which starred Depp. It begins with the two sitting on their respective white and black thrones while surrounded by several naked women covered in satanic symbols. Cain appears in full white face paint and a matching suit, although he is invariably stained with black make-up; Abel sits on his throne while wearing black leather, his face stained by white make-up.

After leaving a possessed Bible outside the door of an apartment building, Abel begins sexually assaulting several of its occupants. The hauntings become gradually more aggressive, culminating in a hooded figure chasing a woman down a tunnel with a knife. Following this, several of the naked women recreate the Raising the Flag on Iwo Jima photo using an inverted Cross of Lorraine, apparently ending the possession. The video ends with Abel committing suicide by slitting his own throat with bloodstained money. The video has received generally positive reviews from critics. Paul Cashmere said that it "perfectly demonstrates the irrelevance of MTV in the 21st century", writing that it saw Manson using "creativity, shock and horror to tell a story, knowing full well that traditional media wouldn't be able to touch this. The video is brilliant in its architecture and strategy." Brandon John of Australian publication ToneDeaf praised Depp's appearance, writing that the "creepiness [quotient is] a step or two above anything Depp has done throughout his long resume of Tim Burton flicks."

== Credits and personnel ==
Credits adapted from the liner notes of Heaven Upside Down.

Credits

- Recorded at Abattoir Studios, Studio City, California
- Songs of Golgotha (BMI)/Box Cutter Music. (BMI), under exclusive licence to Loma Vista Recordings and Caroline International

Personnel

- Marilyn Manson – vocals
- Tyler Bates – instrumentation, engineering, recording, production, mixing
- Robert Carranza – mixing
- Gil Sharone – drums
- Joanne Higginbottom – assistant engineer
- Brian Lucey – mastering (at Magic Garden Mastering, Los Angeles, California)
