= List of awards and nominations received by Marilyn Manson =

Marilyn Manson awards and nominations
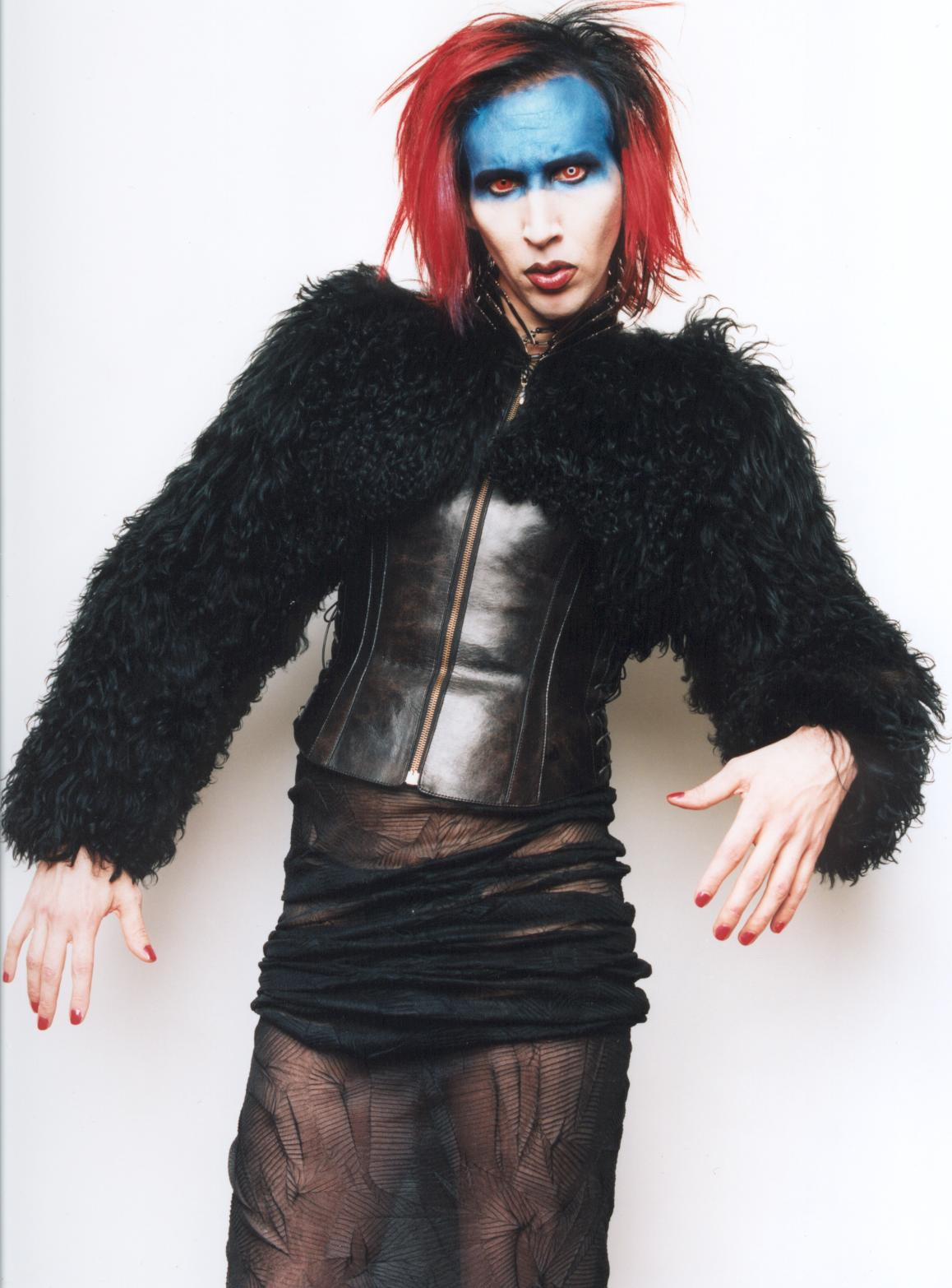
- Marilyn Manson in 1998, during the Mechanical Animals promotional campaign
Awards and nominations
Award	Wins	Nominations
Alternative Press Music Awards	1	2
Billboard Music Video Awards	3	4
BMI Awards	0	1
Echo Music Prize	0	1
Grammy Awards	0	5
Kerrang! Awards	6	8
Loudwire Music Awards	2	6
MTV Europe Music Awards	0	2
MTV Video Music Awards	1	5
NME Awards	1	1
Q Awards	0	1
South Florida Slammies	9	9

Totals (Note: Certain award groups do not simply award one winner. They acknowledge several different recipients, have runners-up, and have third place. Since this is a specific recognition and is different from losing an award, runner-up mentions are considered wins in this award tally. For simplification and to avoid errors, each award in this list has been presumed to have had a prior nomination.)
- Wins: 35
- Nominations: 63

American rock band Marilyn Manson and its eponymous vocalist have received numerous awards and accolades. Formed in 1989 in Fort Lauderdale, Florida by Manson and the band's original guitarist Daisy Berkowitz, their highly visualized concerts quickly gained them a reputation in the South Florida area. The Miami New Times named Marilyn Manson and the Spooky Kids – the earliest incarnation of the band – the 'Best Local Heavy Metal Band' in 1992. The following year, the band – who, by now, had shortened their name to Marilyn Manson – won two awards at the second annual South Florida Slammies. They would go on to win a further seven Slammies over the next three years, making them the second-most decorated band in the awards' history.

The band had its first legitimate hit in 1995 with a cover of Eurythmics' "Sweet Dreams (Are Made of This)". Its video was nominated in the Best Rock Video category at the 1996 MTV Video Music Awards. The lead single from the band's second studio album, "The Beautiful People", was nominated for three awards at the 1997 ceremony, while Marilyn Manson was named 'Best New Artist' by Rolling Stone. "The Dope Show" was released the following year, and the band received the first of a total of four Grammy Award nominations, this time for Best Hard Rock Performance. "The Dope Show" won two awards at the 1998 Billboard Music Video Awards, as well as the award for Best Cinematography at the 1999 VMAs.

The band's frontman has received nominations for his work as a music video director. He was nominated, along with co-director Robert Hales, for 'Best Modern Rock Clip of the Year' at the 2000 Billboard Music Video Awards for his work on Nine Inch Nails' "Starfuckers, Inc." The band have also received numerous international awards and nominations throughout their career, including NME and Q Awards, MTV Europe Music Awards and the Echo Music Prize. They have won six Kerrang! Awards from a total of eight nominations, and were inducted into their Hall of Fame in 2000. Their ninth studio album, The Pale Emperor, was released in 2015 and was nominated for 'Album of the Year' at both the Alternative Press Music Awards and at online magazine Loudwire, while Rolling Stone dubbed it the 'Best Metal Album of 2015'. Marilyn Manson have sold in excess of 50 million records worldwide.

== Alternative Press Music Awards ==
The Alternative Press Music Awards is an annual music awards show, founded by music magazine Alternative Press in 2014. Marilyn Manson have won one award from two nominations.

Year	Nominee / work	Award	Result	Ref.
2016	The Pale Emperor	Album of the Year	Nominated	
2016	Marilyn Manson	Icon Award	Won	

== Billboard Music Video Awards ==
The Billboard Music Video Awards is an annual awards show, founded by the music magazine Billboard and first held in 1989. Marilyn Manson have won three awards from four nominations, including one for the Maximum Vision Award, which "honors the video that best advances an artist's career".

Year	Nominee / work	Award	Result	Ref.
1997	"The Beautiful People"	Hard Rock Clip of the Year	Won	
1998	"The Dope Show"	Best Hard Rock/Metal Video	Won	
1998	"The Dope Show"	Maximum Vision Award	Won	
2000	Nine Inch Nails – "Starfuckers, Inc." (Note: Nominated as co-director along with Robert Hales.)	Best Modern Rock Clip of the Year	Nominated	

== BMI Awards ==
Broadcast Music, Inc. (BMI) is one of three performing rights organizations in the United States, along with ASCAP and SESAC. It collects license fees on behalf of songwriters, composers, and music publishers and distributes them as royalties to those members whose works have been performed. The BMI Awards have been held annually since 1952 to award songwriters in various genres, including country, pop and rock.

Year	Nominee / work	Award	Result	Ref.
2005	"Personal Jesus"	Pop Award	Won	

== Berlin Music Video Awards ==
The Berlin Music Video Awards (BMVA) is an international festival that puts filmmakers and the art behind music videos in the spotlight. Supporting both unknown and famous artists, it is a primary networking event for the video and music industries in Europe. The Berlin Music Video Awards offers 13 different categories, including: Best Animation, Narrative, Song, Low Budget, Cinematography, Art Director, Director, VFX, Editor, Concept, Experimental, Most Bizarre and Trashy. Manson's music video for God's Gonna Cut You Down, filmed by Justin Moro, was nominated for Best Cinematography in 2020.

Year	Nominee / work	Award	Result	Ref.
2020	"God's Gonna Cut You Down"	Best Cinematography	Nominated	

== Best Art Vinyl ==
The Best Art Vinyl award has been awarded since 2005 by Art Vinyl Ltd for the best album artwork of the past year. The award is judged by public vote from a list of 50 nominations from music industry and graphic design experts.

Year	Nominee / work	Award	Result	Ref.
2020	We Are Chaos	Best Vinyl Art	Nominated	

== Echo Music Prize ==
The Echo Music Prize is an accolade by the Deutsche Phono-Akademie, an association of German recording companies, to recognize outstanding achievements in the German music industry. The awards were first held in 1992, and Marilyn Manson have received one nomination.

Year	Nominee / work	Award	Result	Ref.
2008	Marilyn Manson	Best International Rock/Pop Group	Nominated	

== GAFFA-Prisen Awards ==
The GAFFA Awards (Danish: GAFFA Prisen) is a Danish music award that was founded in 1991 by Danish publication Gaffa. Marilyn Manson received two nominations in 2021.

Year	Nominee / work	Award	Result	Ref.
2021	We Are Chaos	International Record of the Year	Pending	
2021	Marilyn Manson	International Soloist of the Year	Pending	

== Grammy Awards ==
A Grammy Award is an honor awarded by the National Academy of Recording Arts and Sciences of the United States to recognize outstanding achievement in the mainly English-language music industry. Marilyn Manson has received four nominations, while Manson himself earned an additional nomination for his work on Kanye West's 2021 studio album Donda.

Year	Nominee / work	Award	Result	Ref.
1999	"The Dope Show"	Best Hard Rock Performance	Nominated	
2001	"Astonishing Panorama of the Endtimes"	Best Metal Performance	Nominated	
2004	"mOBSCENE"	Best Metal Performance	Nominated	
2013	"No Reflection"	Best Hard Rock/Metal Performance	Nominated	
2022	Donda (as featured artist)	Album of the Year	Nominated	

== Hungarian Music Awards ==
The Hungarian Music Awards are the national music awards of Hungary, founded in 1992 by the country's chart and certification body, Mahasz. Marilyn Manson received two nominations for Hard Rock/Metal Album of the Year, in 2010 and 2018, losing to Rammstein's Liebe ist für alle da and Stone Sour's Hydrograd, respectively.

Year	Nominee / work	Award	Result	Ref.
2010	The High End of Low	Hard Rock/Metal Album of the Year	Nominated	
2018	Heaven Upside Down	Hard Rock/Metal Album of the Year	Nominated	

== Kerrang! Awards ==
The Kerrang! Awards is an annual awards ceremony founded in 1993 by British rock magazine Kerrang!. Marilyn Manson have received six awards from eight nominations.

Year	Nominee / work	Award	Result	Ref.
1997	Marilyn Manson	Best International Live Act	Won	
1997	Marilyn Manson	Best Best in the World	Won	
1999	Marilyn Manson	Best Best in the World	Won	
2000	Marilyn Manson	Hall of Fame	Won	
2001	Holy Wood (In the Shadow of the Valley of Death)	Best Album	Won	
2002	"Tainted Love"	Best Single	Nominated	
2002	"Tainted Love"	Best Video	Won	
2003	"mOBSCENE"	Best Video	Nominated	
2005	Marilyn Manson	Kerrang! Icon	Won	
2015	Marilyn Manson	Lifetime Achievement Award	Won	

== Loudwire Music Awards ==
The Loudwire Music Awards have been awarded annually since 2011 by the American online magazine Loudwire. Marilyn Manson have received two awards from six nominations.

Year	Nominee / work	Award	Result	Ref.
2012	Born Villain	Rock Album of the Year	Won	
2012	"No Reflection"	Rock Song of the Year	Nominated	
2012	"No Reflection"	Rock Video of the Year	Won	
2015	The Pale Emperor	Best Rock Album	Nominated	
2015	"The Mephistopheles of Los Angeles"	Best Rock Song	Nominated	
2015	"The Mephistopheles of Los Angeles"	Best Rock Video	Nominated	

== Metal Edge Awards ==
Metal Edge was a heavy metal music magazine published from 1985 to 2009. The band won four Readers' Choice Awards.

Year	Nominee / work	Award	Result	Ref.
1997	"Long Hard Road Out of Hell"	Best Song from a Movie Soundtrack	Won	
2000	God Is in the TV	Home Video of the Year	Won	
2000	Marilyn Manson	Live Performer of the Year	Won	
2001	Marilyn Manson	Male Performer of the Year	Won	

== MTV Awards ==
=== MTV Europe Music Awards ===
The MTV Europe Music Awards (EMAs) were established in 1994 by MTV Networks Europe to celebrate the most popular music in Europe. Marilyn Manson have received two nominations.

Year	Nominee / work	Award	Result	Ref.
1998	Marilyn Manson	Best Rock	Nominated	
1999	Marilyn Manson	Best Rock	Nominated	

=== MTV Video Music Awards ===
The MTV Video Music Awards, commonly abbreviated as VMA, were established in 1984 by MTV to celebrate the top music videos of the year. Marilyn Manson have received one award from five nominations.

Year	Nominee / work	Award	Result	Ref.
1996	"Sweet Dreams (Are Made of This)"	Best Rock Video	Nominated	
1997	"The Beautiful People"	Best Rock Video	Nominated	
1997	"The Beautiful People"	Best Special Effects in a Video	Nominated	
1997	"The Beautiful People"	Best Art Direction in a Video	Nominated	
1999	"The Dope Show"	Best Cinematography in a Video	Won	

== Music Video Production Awards ==
The MVPAs are annually presented by a Los Angeles-based music trade organization to honor the year's best music videos.

Year	Nominee / work	Award	Result	Ref.
1997	"The Beautiful People"	Best Editing (Note: Awarded to Michelle Cuzar.)	Won	
1997	"The Beautiful People"	Best Art Direction (Note: Awarded to Kenny Baird.)	Won	
1997	"The Beautiful People"	Best Styling (Note: Awarded to Carole Beadie.)	Won	
1998	"The Dope Show"	Best Director (Note: Awarded to director Paul Hunter.)	Won	
1998	"The Dope Show"	Rock Video of the Year	Won	
2001	"Disposable Teens"	Rock Video of the Year	Nominated	
2001	"Disposable Teens"	Best Cinematography	Nominated	
2001	"The Fight Song"	Best Colorist/Telecine	Nominated	
2005	"Personal Jesus"	Best Colorist/Telecine	Nominated	
2005	"Personal Jesus"	Best Cinematography	Nominated	

== NME Awards ==
The NME Awards are an annual music awards show founded by the British music magazine NME and first held in 1953. Marilyn Manson have received one award from one nomination.

Year	Nominee / work	Award	Result	Ref.
2001	Marilyn Manson	Best Metal Act	Won	

== O Music Awards ==
The O Music Awards is an awards show presented by Viacom to honor music, technology and intersection between the two. The first O Music Awards ceremony was held on April 28, 2011, on Fremont Street in Downtown Las Vegas.

Year	Nominee / work	Award	Result	Ref.
2011	Born Villain	"Too Much Ass for TV"	Won	

== Pollstar Concert Industry Awards ==
The Pollstar Concert Industry Awards is an awards show held annually by trade publication Pollstar. First held in 1984, its aim is to honor various aspects of the concert industry, including musicians and tours, as well as the best venues, promoters and booking agents.

Year	Nominee / work	Award	Result	Ref.
1996	"Dead to the World Tour"	Club Tour of the Year	Nominated	

== Q Awards ==
The Q Awards are an annual awards show first held in 1993 and founded by British music magazine Q. Marilyn Manson have received one nomination.

Year	Nominee / work	Award	Result	Ref.
2002	"Tainted Love"	Best Video	Nominated	

== Revolver Golden Gods Awards ==
The Revolver Golden Gods Awards are an annual awards show first held in 2009 and founded by British hard rock magazine Revolver. Marilyn Manson have received one nomination.

Year	Nominee / work	Award	Result	Ref.
2013	Born Villain	Album of the Year	Nominated	

== South Florida Slammie Awards ==
The South Florida Slammie Awards was an awards ceremony founded by Slammie Productions, which ran from 1992 until 1999. It was dedicated to honoring bands from South Florida's metal, punk and hardcore rock communities. Marilyn Manson won nine awards from nine nominations, making them the third-most decorated band in the awards' history. Only Load and Amboog-a-Lard, the latter being bassist Twiggy Ramirez's former band, won more awards (10 each).

Year	Nominee / work	Award	Result	Ref.
1993	"Dope Hat"	Song of the Year	Won	
1993	Marilyn Manson	Band of the Year	Won	
1994	Marilyn Manson	Band of the Year	Won	
1994	Marilyn Manson	Vocalist of the Year	Won	
1995	"Lunchbox"	Best Single	Won	
1995	Portrait of an American Family	Best National Release	Won	
1996	Smells Like Children	Best National Release	Won	
1996	Marilyn Manson	Vocalist of the Year	Won	
1996	"Sweet Dreams (Are Made of This)"	Best Single	Won	

== Miscellaneous awards and honors ==
=== Martin Popoff ===
Martin Popoff is a Canadian music journalist and critic who covers the genre of heavy metal music. He is the senior editor and co-founder of Brave Words & Bloody Knuckles, and he has additionally written over twenty books that both critically evaluate and document the history of heavy metal. Popoff compiled The Top 500 Heavy Metal Albums of All Time and The Top 500 Heavy Metal Songs of All Time by asking fans, musicians and journalists to create numbered lists of their favorite albums and songs. Almost 18,000 individual votes were tallied and entered into a database, from which the final rankings were derived. Each book contains one release by Marilyn Manson.

Year	Nominee / work	Award	Result	Ref.
2003	"The Beautiful People"	The Top 500 Heavy Metal Songs of All Time	#206	
2004	Mechanical Animals	The Top 500 Heavy Metal Albums of All Time	#483	

=== Miami New Times ===
The Miami New Times is a weekly newspaper based in Miami since 1987. The publication named Marilyn Manson and the Spooky Kids the 'Best Local Heavy Metal Band' in 1992.

Year	Nominee / work	Award	Result	Ref.
1992	Marilyn Manson and the Spooky Kids	Best Local Heavy Metal Band	Won	

=== Rolling Stone ===
Rolling Stone is a biweekly magazine founded in 1967 by publisher Jann Wenner and music critic Ralph J. Gleason. Marilyn Manson were named 'Best New Artist' by the publication in 1997, and in 2015 The Pale Emperor was dubbed the 'Best Metal Album of 2015'.

Year	Nominee / work	Award	Result	Ref.
1997	Marilyn Manson	Best New Artist	Won	
2015	The Pale Emperor	Best Metal Album	Won	

== Žebřík Music Awards ==
Year	Nominee / work	Award	Result	Ref.–
1996	Marilyn Manson	Best International Surprise	Nominated	
1998	Marilyn Manson	Best International Surprise	Won	
1998	Marilyn Manson	Best International Male	Nominated	
1998	Marilyn Manson	Best International Personality	Nominated	
1998	Marilyn Manson	Best International Průser	Nominated	
1998	Mechanical Animals	Best International Album	Nominated	
1998	"The Dope Show"	Best International Video	Nominated	
1999	Marilyn Manson	Best International Male	Nominated	
1999	Marilyn Manson	Best International Personality	Nominated	
1999	Marilyn Manson	Best International Průser	Nominated	
2000	Marilyn Manson	Best International Průser	Nominated	
2000	Marilyn Manson	Best International Male	Nominated	
2000	Marilyn Manson	Best International Group	Nominated	
2000	Marilyn Manson	Best International Personality	Won	
2000	Marilyn Manson	Best International Surprise	Won	
2000	Holy Wood	Best International Album	Nominated	
2000	"Disposable Teens"	Best International Song	Nominated	
2000	"Disposable Teens"	Best International Video	Won	
2001	"The Nobodies"	Best International Video	Nominated	
2001	Marilyn Manson	Best International Group	Nominated	
2001	Marilyn Manson	Best International Male	Nominated	
2003	Marilyn Manson	Best International Male	Nominated	
2003	Marilyn Manson	Best International Personality	Nominated	
2003	The Golden Age of Grotesque	Best International Album	Nominated	
2003	"This Is the New Shit"	Best International Song	Nominated	
2003	"This Is the New Shit"	Best International Video	Nominated	
2005	Marilyn Manson	Best International Male	Nominated	
2005	Marilyn Manson	Best International Personality	Nominated	
