= Guns, God and Government =

Video by Marilyn Manson
- Released: October 29, 2002
- Recorded: 1999–2001
- Genre: Alternative metal; heavy metal; industrial metal
- Length: 79:49 (DVD concert); 29:53 (The Death Parade); 72:59 (Blu-ray concert)
- Label: Eagle Rock
- Director: Perou; Duncan Black; J. T. Harding; Steve Macauley; Blue Leach
- Producer: Marilyn Manson; Geoff Foulkes; Mark Hurry; Daniel Catullo III

Marilyn Manson chronology
God Is in the T.V. (1999)	Guns, God and Government (2002)

Professional ratings
Review scores
Source	Rating
Blu-ray.com	4/5
Classic Rock	7/10 stars
Ultimate Guitar Archive	8.1/10

Guns, God and Government is the third live video album by American rock band Marilyn Manson, released on October 29, 2002 on the formats VHS, DVD and UMD, documenting the tour of the same name. The DVD contains live performances that switch between visuals of various shows from United States, Japan, Russia and Europe while maintaining a single consistent music track.

On November 16, 2009, the live performance of the October 8, 2001 concert in Los Angeles was released in Blu-ray format. The re-release documents the concert in full instead of a montage of live performances as previously released in the 2002 DVD version. "The Death Song" was removed from this edition since it wasn't shown on the pay-per-view telecast when originally premiered.

Both releases contain additional content in the form of a short film titled "The Death Parade" that was mixed by Rogers Masson and Marilyn Manson. It features a backstage look at the band's tour including cameos from such artists as Ozzy Osbourne, Joey Jordison and Eminem.

== Release ==
=== Track listing ===
1. "Intro" / "Count to Six and Die" – 2:16
2. "Irresponsible Hate Anthem" – 3:46
3. "The Reflecting God" – 5:34
4. "Great Big White World" – 5:02
5. "Disposable Teens" – 3:56
6. "The Fight Song" – 4:19
7. "The Nobodies" – 3:56
8. "Rock Is Dead" – 3:13
9. "The Dope Show" – 4:14
10. "Cruci-Fiction in Space" – 5:02
11. "Sweet Dreams" / "Hell Outro" – 6:14
12. "The Love Song" – 3:13
13. "The Death Song" – 3:28 (DVD only)
14. "Antichrist Superstar" – 4:20
15. "The Beautiful People" – 5:05
16. "Astonishing Panorama of the Endtimes" – 4:08
17. "Lunchbox" – 9:02
18. "Outro" – 2:16 (unlisted)
- "The Death Parade" – 29:53

== Technical specifications ==
=== DVD ===
- DVD-9 Dual Layer
- 4:3 screen format
- Audio: DTS Digital Surround Sound, Dolby Surround 5.1, Dolby Digital Stereo

=== Blu-ray ===
- Video codec: MPEG-4 AVC
- Video resolution: 1080i
- Aspect ratio: 1.78:1 (16x9)
- Audio: DTS-HD Master Audio 5.1, Dolby Digital 5.1, LPCM 2.0

== Certifications ==
Region	Certification	Certified units/sales
Australia (ARIA)	Platinum	15,000^{^}
Canada (Music Canada)	Platinum	10,000^{^}
Germany (BVMI)	Gold	25,000^{^}
United Kingdom (BPI)	Gold	25,000^{^}
United States (RIAA)	Platinum	100,000^{^}
^{^} Shipments figures based on certification alone.

== Personnel ==
- Marilyn Manson — lead vocals
- John 5 — guitars, backing vocals
- Twiggy Ramirez — bass, backing vocals
- Madonna Wayne Gacy — keyboards
- Ginger Fish — drums
