= Holy Wood (In the Shadow of the Valley of Death) =

Studio album by Marilyn Manson
- Released: November 11, 2000
- Recorded: 1999–2000
- Studios: The Mansion, Laurel Canyon; Holly Studios, Hollywood Hills; Sunset Sound Factory, Los Angeles; Westlake Recording Studios, West Hollywood
- Genres: Industrial rock; industrial metal; alternative metal
- Length: 68:16
- Labels: Nothing; Interscope
- Producers: Marilyn Manson; Dave Sardy

Marilyn Manson chronology
The Last Tour on Earth (1999)	Holy Wood (In the Shadow of the Valley of Death) (2000)	The Golden Age of Grotesque (2003)

Singles from Holy Wood (In the Shadow of the Valley of Death)
- 1. "Disposable Teens" Released: November 7, 2000; 2. "The Fight Song" Released: February 2, 2001; 3. "The Nobodies" Released: October 6, 2001

Alternative cover
- Censored cover

Holy Wood (In the Shadow of the Valley of Death) is the fourth studio album by American rock band Marilyn Manson. It was released on November 11, 2000, by Nothing and Interscope Records. A rock opera concept album, it is the final installment of a triptych that also included Antichrist Superstar (1996), and marked a return to the industrial metal style of the band's earlier work, after the glam rock-influenced production of Mechanical Animals (1998). After its release, the band's eponymous vocalist said that the overarching story within the trilogy is presented in reverse chronological order: Holy Wood, therefore, begins the narrative.

In the aftermath of the Columbine High School massacre on April 20, 1999, national news media reported that the perpetrators were wearing the band's T-shirts during the rampage, and had been influenced by their music, both of which were untrue. As their first release after the massacre, the record was Manson's rebuttal to the accusations leveled against him and the group, and was described by the vocalist as a "declaration of war". It was written in the singer's former home in the Hollywood Hills and recorded in several undisclosed locations, including Death Valley and Laurel Canyon. His ambitions for Holy Wood initially included an eponymous film exploring its backstory—a project which has since been abandoned and was modified into the as-yet-unreleased Holy Wood novel.

The album was released to generally positive reviews. Several writers praised it as the band's finest work, and multiple publications ranked it as one of the best albums of 2000. British rock magazine Kerrang! went on to include it on its list of the best albums of the decade. In the US, Holy Wood was not as commercially successful as the band's preceding records, debuting at number 13 on the Billboard 200. However, it became their most successful album internationally, debuting in the top twenty of numerous national charts. It was certified gold in several countries, including Canada, Japan, Switzerland and the UK.

Three singles were released from the record: "Disposable Teens", "The Fight Song" and "The Nobodies", and the band embarked on the worldwide Guns, God and Government Tour. In 2010, Kerrang! published a 10th-anniversary commemorative piece in which they called the album "Manson's finest hour ... A decade on, there has still not been as eloquent and savage a musical attack on the media and mainstream culture ... [It is] still scathingly relevant [and] a credit to a man who refused to sit and take it, but instead come out swinging."

== Background and development ==
1999 was a pivotal year—as was 1969, the year of my birth. The two years share many similarities. Woodstock '99 became an Altamont of its own. Columbine became the Manson murders of our generation. Things happened that could've made me want to stop making music. Instead, I decided to come out and really punish everyone for daring to fuck with me. I've got a big fight ahead of me on this one. And I want every bit of it.

— Marilyn Manson

In the late 1990s, Marilyn Manson and his eponymous band established themselves as a household name, and as one of the most controversial rock acts in music history. Their albums Antichrist Superstar (1996) and Mechanical Animals (1998) were both critical and commercial successes, and by the time of their Rock Is Dead Tour in 1999, the frontman had become a culture war iconoclast and a rallying icon for alienated youth. As their popularity increased, the confrontational nature of the group's music and imagery outraged social conservatives. Numerous politicians lobbied to have their performances banned, citing false and exaggerated claims that they contained animal sacrifices, bestiality and rape. Their concerts were routinely picketed by religious advocates and parent groups, who asserted that their music had a corrupting influence on youth culture by inciting "rape, murder, blasphemy and suicide".

On April 20, 1999, Columbine High School students Eric Harris and Dylan Klebold shot dead 13 students and a teacher and wounded 21 others, before committing suicide. In the aftermath of the school shooting, the band were widely reported to have influenced the killings; early media reports alleged that the shooters were fans, and were wearing the group's T-shirts during the massacre. Although these claims were later proven to be false, speculation in national media and among the public continued to blame Manson's music and imagery for inciting Harris and Klebold. Later reports revealed that the two were not fans—and, on the contrary, had disliked the band's music. Despite this, Marilyn Manson (as well as other bands and forms of entertainment, such as movies and video games) were widely criticized by religious, political, and entertainment-industry figures.

Under mounting pressure in the days after Columbine, the group postponed their last five North American tour dates out of respect for the victims and their families. On April 29, ten US senators (led by Sam Brownback of Kansas) sent a letter to Edgar Bronfman Jr. – the president of Seagram (the owner of Interscope) – requesting a voluntary halt to his company's distribution to children of "music that glorifies violence". The letter named Marilyn Manson for producing songs which "eerily reflect" the actions of Harris and Klebold. Later that day, the band cancelled their remaining North American shows. Two days later, Manson published his response to these accusations in an op-ed piece for Rolling Stone, titled "Columbine: Whose Fault Is It?", where he castigated America's gun culture, the political influence of the National Rifle Association of America, and the media's irresponsible coverage, which he said facilitated the placing of blame on a scapegoat, instead of debating more relevant societal issues.

On May 4, a hearing on the marketing and distribution of violent content to minors by the television, music, film and video-game industries was held by the United States Senate Committee on Commerce, Science and Transportation. The committee heard testimony from former Secretary of Education (and co-founder of conservative violent entertainment watchdog group Empower America) William Bennett, the Archbishop of Denver Charles J. Chaput, professors and mental-health professionals. Speakers criticized the band, its label-mate Nine Inch Nails, and the 1999 film The Matrix for their alleged contribution to a cultural environment enabling violence such as the Columbine shootings. The committee requested that the Federal Trade Commission and the United States Department of Justice investigate the entertainment industry's marketing practices to minors.

After concluding the European and Japanese legs of their tour on August 8, the band withdrew from public view. The early development of Holy Wood coincided with Manson's three-month seclusion at his home in the Hollywood Hills, during which he considered how to respond to the controversy. Manson said the maelstrom made him re-evaluate his career: "There was a bit of trepidation, [in] deciding: 'Is it worth it? Are people understanding what I'm trying to say? Am I even gonna be allowed to say it?' Because I definitely had every single door shut in my face ... there were not a lot of people who stood behind me." He told Alternative Press that he felt his safety was threatened to the point that he "could be shot Mark David Chapman-style." He began work on the album as a counterattack.

== Recording and production ==
Several of the tracks that appear on Holy Wood date back to 1995, prior to the release of Antichrist Superstar, although much of this material consisted of "scattered ideas". Manson, the band's vocalist, developed this material into more substantial compositions during his three-month period of seclusion. Following this, the full band worked for a year on re-writing and developing the material. The record is the group's most collaborative effort to date; all members contributed to the songwriting process. Most of the compositional work was done by Manson alongside guitarists Twiggy Ramirez and John 5. The vocalist contrasted his songwriting sessions between the two, calling sessions with the latter "very focused", saying that most of their compositions would be completed before being taken to the rest of the band for consideration. In contrast, his sessions with Ramirez were less demanding, and the pair frequently experimented with absinthe. Drummer Ginger Fish worked constantly on new material, and is credited with performing keyboards and programming, while keyboardist Madonna Wayne Gacy provided input on "President Dead" and "Cruci-Fiction in Space". Altogether, the band wrote 100 musical fragments, of which between 25 and 30 became songs.

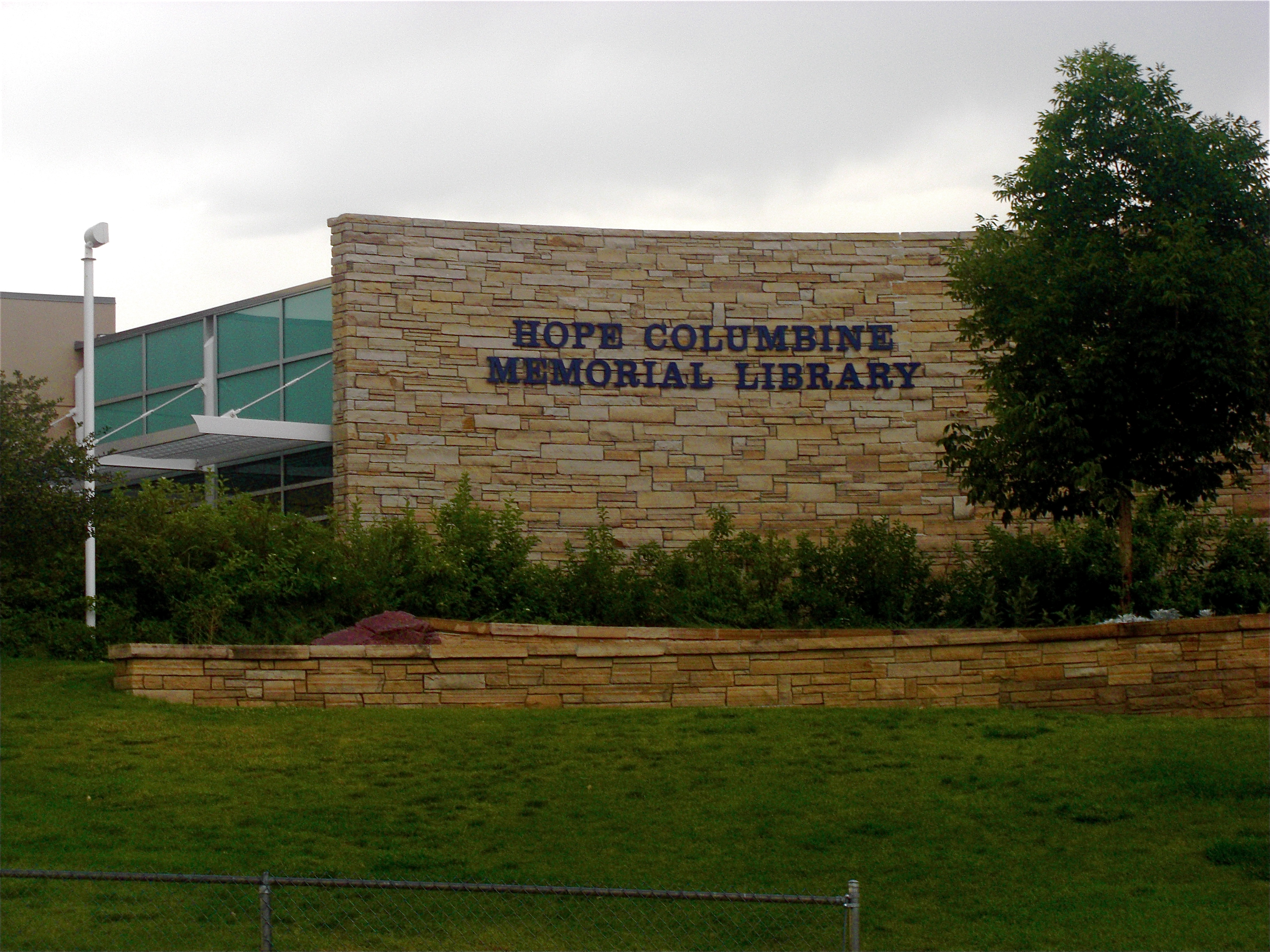
The Hope Columbine Memorial Library was constructed at the Columbine High School campus after the tragic school shooting to memorialize the victims.

Band members maintained a low profile during the album's recording. Manson indicated that their website would be their "only contact with humanity" during this period. The album was recorded at several locations, including Death Valley, Manson's home in the Hollywood Hills, and Rick Rubin's Mansion Studio in Laurel Canyon. (Note: John 5: "Instead of going into a regular studio, we rented the Houdini house in Laurel Canyon. We brought in an old-school analog tape machine and a vintage Neve console for tracking, and we used Pro Tools for editing.") Locations were chosen for the atmosphere they were intended to impart to the music, and the band visited Death Valley a number of times to "imprint the feeling of the desert into [their] minds", and to avoid composing artificial-sounding songs. Manson co-produced the album alongside mixing engineer Dave Sardy, while Bon Harris of electronic body music group Nitzer Ebb is credited with programming and pre-production editing. (Note: Fish credited Sardy with introducing him to a superior method of recording drums:"Sardy was an opposite of what I was used to [...] getting a great drum sound. Working with Michael Beinhorn on [Mechanical Animals] and people in the past, people would say, 'Hit harder, hit harder, hit harder.' The harder you hit, all you end up doing is choking a drum or breaking a head or a stick, and Sardy was sworn on hitting a drum really lightly, and [still] getting a thick, warm sound from it. So what ended up happening was I would track first thing in the morning. To begin with, I'd be playing very lightly and very quietly, and the more excited I would get, the more blood pumping through my veins, I would start hitting hard. In the middle of the day when I'd start getting pissed off, he'd cut me off and we'd start in the morning again. I would take it. I knew where he was going with it. I could hear the drums, and I knew the sound he was looking for early in the morning.") Experimental sound effects and acoustic songs were recorded using live instrumentation. (Note: John 5 on the equipment used during recording: "We had lots of equipment in the studio—all sorts of weird stuff I would never use live. For amps, we had an old European Davoli, some '70s Marshalls, a Fender Twin, a Laney, and a few Oranges. For guitars, we had several '70s Gibson Les Pauls and doublenecks. But the main guitars used on the album were Manson's Ibanez Artist, a Les Paul, and a Jackson Randy Rhoads model from Twiggy's collection. Also, the second engineer had a great '70s Les Paul [...] For effects, we had all these old Foxx and Electro-Harmonix effects pedals from the '70s. We would just experiment with everything until we found the perfect sound.") Harris' programming skills would prove invaluable during the recording process, as he would take the natural sounds the band had been recording and reconstruct them into processed background effects. Manson also explained that the acoustic songs were "acoustic" in the sense that they were not recorded with electronic instruments, but he said the album's sonic landscape would be "intrinsically electronic".

Manson announced on December 16, 1999, that the album was progressing under the working title In the Shadow of the Valley of Death, and that its logo would be the alchemical symbol for mercury. Expanding on the symbol's relationship to the album's concept, Manson said "It represents both the androgyne and the prima materia, which has been associated with Adam, the first man." The band spent considerable time at the Mansion Studio, where the bulk of Ginger Fish's live drumming would be recorded, with its cavernous rooms particularly suitable for recording percussion. On February 23, 2000, Manson delivered a 20-minute lecture via satellite to a current-events convention, "DisinfoCon 2000", aimed at exposing disinformation wherein he posed the question, "White teenagers, why are they mad? They're white. They're spoiled. Is it because they know that America's a lie? ... Is adult entertainment killing our children? Or is killing our children entertaining adults?" Six days later, it was announced that their upcoming album had been re-titled Holy Wood (In the Shadow of the Valley of Death). By April, the album was in the final stages of recording, and Manson began posting footage of the band from the studio.

=== Novel and film ===
Manson's ambitions for the project initially included an eponymous film exploring the album's backstory. In July 1999, he had reportedly begun negotiating with New Line Cinema to produce and distribute the film and its soundtrack. At the 1999 MTV Europe Music Awards in Dublin (where the band performed on November 11), he disclosed the film's title and his production plans. Manson met Chilean avant-garde filmmaker Alejandro Jodorowsky at the event to discuss work on the film, although no final decision was made. By February 29, 2000, the deal fell through when Manson had reservations that New Line Cinema would take the film in a direction which would not have "retained his artistic vision".

Abandoning his attempt to bring Holy Wood to the screen, Manson announced plans to publish two books accompanying the album. The first was a "graphic and phantasmagoric" novel intended for release shortly after the album by ReganBooks (a division of HarperCollins). The novel's style was inspired by William S. Burroughs, Kurt Vonnegut, Aldous Huxley and Philip K. Dick, and would be followed by a coffee table book of images created for the project. In a December 2000 interview with Manson, novelist Chuck Palahniuk mentioned the Holy Wood novel (due for release in spring 2001) and complimented its style. Neither book has been released, reportedly due to a publishing dispute.

== Concept and themes ==
Holy Wood—which isn't even that great of a hyperbole of America—is a place where an obituary is just another headline. Where if you die and enough people are watching, then you're famous.

— Marilyn Manson, on the album's concept

Manson described Holy Wood as a "declaration of war." The album's plot is a parable, which he told Rolling Stone was semi-autobiographical. While it can be viewed on several levels, he said its simplest interpretation is to see it as a story about an idealistic man whose revolution is commercialized, leading him to "destroy the thing he has created, which is himself." It takes place in a thinly veiled satire of modern America called "Holy Wood", which Manson described as a Disney-esque city-sized amusement park where the main attractions are death and violence, and where consumerism is taken to hyperbolic extreme. Its literary foil is "Death Valley", which is used as a "metaphor for the outcast and the imperfect of the world."

The central character is the protagonist Adam Kadmon—a name derived from the Kabbalah which means "original man". The story follows him as he goes in search of a better life out of Death Valley and into Holy Wood. Disenchanted by what he finds, he fashions a counterculture revolution, only to have it usurped and co-opted by Holy Wood's consumer culture, and he finds himself appropriated as a figure of Holy Wood's ideology of "Celebritarianism": an ideology in which fame is the primary moral value of a religion deeply rooted in celebrity worship and martyrdom; where dead celebrities are revered as saints, and John F. Kennedy is idolized as the contemporary Jesus Christ. Holy Wood's religion parallels Christianity, in that it juxtaposes the dead-celebrity phenomenon in American culture with the crucifixion of Jesus.

Stylized version of the alchemical symbol for mercury, used by the band as a logo for the album and the character of Adam Kadmon

The phrase "guns, god and government" is repeated multiple times throughout the album. It is suggested that these are the root cause of violence, and the album examines the role conservative American culture played in the Columbine massacre: specifically, what Manson perceived as its advocacy of gun culture, the inadequacies and negative effects of traditional family values, the American inclination toward war-mongering solely for profit, and the Christian right's proclivity for moral panic. This glorification of violence within mainstream American culture is the central theme of the record. A substantive portion of the record analyzes the cultural role of Jesus Christ, specifically Manson's view that the image of his crucifixion was the origin of celebrity. Manson said that while his previous work argued against the Bible's content, for the purpose of Holy Wood, he instead looked for things in the Bible to which he could relate. He developed an opinion that Christ was a revolutionary figure—a person who was killed for having dangerous opinions, and whose image was later exploited and merchandised for financial gain in the name of free market capitalism.

Christ's death is also compared to Abraham Zapruder's film of the assassination of John F. Kennedy, which Manson called "the only thing that's happened in modern times to equal the crucifixion." He watched the clip many times as a child, and said it was the most violent thing he had ever seen. John Lennon is also referred to on the album as an assassinated icon murdered by a born-again Christian, Mark David Chapman, who was incensed by Lennon's "more popular than Jesus" remark. While recording Holy Wood, Manson was drawn to The Beatles' 1968 White Album, due to its alleged role in inspiring the Charles Manson "Family" murders, and the parallels he observed between that incident and Columbine, saying: "To my knowledge, it's the first rock n' roll record that's been blamed and linked to violence. When you've got "Helter Skelter" [taken from the Beatles song of the same name] written in blood on someone's wall, it's a little more damning than anything I've been blamed for."

== Composition and style ==
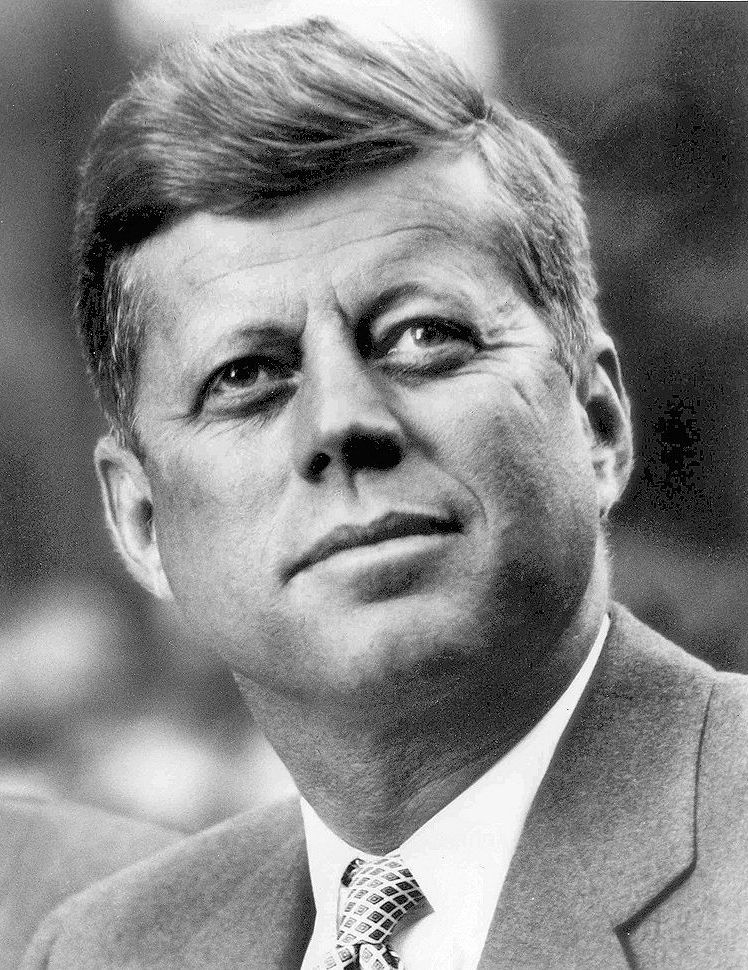
The assassination of John F. Kennedy (left) and the murder of John Lennon (right) serve as major thematic elements in the album.

Holy Wood is primarily an industrial rock, industrial metal and alternative metal album. Manson claimed in a pre-release interview with Kerrang! that the album would contain some of the heaviest material the band had recorded to date. Holy Wood combines the glam rock-influenced production of Mechanical Animals with the industrial rock soundscape of the band's earlier work. He also called the record "arrogant, in an art rock sense" and said that, as a result of the lyrical content, most of the songs contained three or four distinct parts, although the band took great care to avoid being "self-indulgent". He also said that the record was intended to be the "industrial White Album", and that he wrote Holy Wood in the same house where The Rolling Stones wrote their 1970 single "Let It Bleed"—another source of inspiration.

Like Antichrist Superstar before it, Holy Wood uses a song cycle structure, dividing the album into four movements. These movements are titled A: In the Shadow, D: The Androgyne, A: Of Red Earth, and M: The Fallen. Manson described the record as "the final piece of a triptych that I began with Antichrist Superstar." Despite being the last of the three albums to be released, Manson explained that the triptych's storyline takes place in reverse chronological order; Holy Wood began the story, and Mechanical Animals and Antichrist Superstar were sequels. The storyline unfolds in a multi-tiered series of metaphors and allusions; for example, the album's title refers not only to the Hollywood Sign, but also to "the tree of knowledge that Adam took the first fruit from when he fell out of paradise, the wood that Christ was crucified on, the wood that [Lee Harvey] Oswald's rifle is made from, and the wood that so many coffins are made of."

=== A: In the Shadow ===
"The Love Song"
"The Love Song" applies dark humor to satirize America's concept of traditional family values by drawing parallels to its love affair with guns and violence.

"GodEatGod" is the first song on the record. It opens with the sound of a focal-plane shutter in slow-motion capturing gunshots ringing in the background amid screaming onlookers before transitioning into the song. The song is driven by keyboards, synthesizers and a synth bass. "The Love Song" was described by Manson as about "America's romance with guns", and its title originated from his observation that "Love Song" is one of the most common titles in music. The lyrics are composed around an elaborate metaphor about guns. Manson explained: "I was suggesting with the lyrics that the father is the hand, the mother is the gun, and the children are the bullets. Where you shoot them is your responsibility as parents." The chorus is a rhetorical take on a popular American bumper sticker: "Do you love your God, gun, government?" Kerrang! described "The Fight Song" as a "playground punk anthem", and Manson revealed that its theme is Adam's desire to be a part of Holy Wood, saying that it is about "a person who's grown up all his life thinking that the grass is greener on the other side, but when he finally [gets there], he realizes that it's worse than where he came from." "Disposable Teens" is a "signature Marilyn Manson song" with a bouncing guitar riff composed of staccato articulation. Its lyrics juxtapose the disenfranchisement of contemporary millennial youth with the revolutionary idealism of their baby boomer parents' generation. The Beatles' influence is evident in this song; the chorus echoes the disillusionment of the White Album's "Revolution 1".

=== D: The Androgyne ===
Manson singled out "Target Audience (Narcissus Narcosis)" as his favorite song on the album and said that it describes every person's desire for self-actualization. The song features an optigan and is propelled by flanged arpeggiated chords, building into heavy guitar chugs and string bending during the chorus. Drowned In Sound described the song as "a shining moment" on the record. "President Dead" is a guitar-driven song showcasing John 5's technical skills and writing credits from John 5, Twiggy Ramirez, and Madonna Wayne Gacy. Manson also plays a mellotron. It opens with a sample of Don Gardiner's ABC News Radio broadcast announcing the death of John F. Kennedy. The song is 3:13 long, which is a deliberate numerological reference to frame 313 of the Zapruder film—the frame displaying the moment of impact of the fatal head shot which killed Kennedy. "In the Shadow of the Valley of Death" is an introspective song with Adam at his most emotionally vulnerable. The song is divided into two parts. The first portion consists of samples and a 'death loop' (Note: Ginger Fish: "There's a song that's very creepy and slow, it starts off with the 'Death Loop', it sounds like you're frying a baby on a frying pan. And stuff like that. I take a lot of things from environments of where I am. Anything that reminds me of a sound or a beat, I will screw with the sound and put it into a time frame. So just by speeding things up and slowing things down you can speed it into a texture or a beat.") over a simple strum from John 5's 1952 Gibson acoustic guitar that make way for a bass guitar and drums over plucked chords in the second portion. "Cruci-Fiction in Space" further explores American gun culture, postulating that Americans took an alternate evolutionary path; from monkeys to men to firearms. Its composition is slow but heavy—bereft of "speed or intricacy." It has a mixed meter drum beat middle 8 in 4/4 time with two additional eighth notes at the end; "it doesn't start in 4/4, it doesn't end in 4/4, so it's confusing." "A Place in the Dirt" is another personal song, characterized by Adam's self-analysis of his place in Holy Wood.

=== A: Of Red Earth ===
"Lamb of God"
"Lamb of God" sees Manson criticizing his accusers for turning tragedy into televised spectacle, using the assassinations of John F. Kennedy and John Lennon as examples.

"The Nobodies" is a mournful, elegiac dirge constructed over an electric harpsichord and synthesized-drums. Its title is taken from a quote by Mark David Chapman. The verse "Today I am dirty and I want to be pretty, tomorrow I'll know that I'm just dirt" has an Iggy Pop-style vocal delivery, building to the "adrenaline-fueled" chorus. CMJ noted that the song could be interpreted as a tribute to the Columbine shooters, but its point was not to glorify violence; rather, it was to depict a society drenched in its children's blood. "The Death Song" is the turning point for Adam; he no longer cares. Manson described it as sarcastic and nihilistic: "it's like 'We have no future and we don't give a fuck'." Kerrang! described it as one of the album's heaviest songs. The bridge of "Lamb of God" paraphrases the chorus of "Across the Universe" (from 1970's Let It Be), whose lyric "Nothing's gonna change my world" inspired the song. Manson elaborated that: "Mark David Chapman came along and proved him very wrong. That was always something growing up that was very sad and tragic to me". The song uses the assassinations of John F. Kennedy and John Lennon to criticize the media's veneration of death, and for turning tragedy into televised spectacle. It is keyboard-heavy and feature a variety of instrumentation ranging from a piano, a minipiano, a leslie speaker, and multiple synthesizers. Unusual recording techniques were employed for its rhythm and acoustic guitar parts. (Note: John 5: "For "Lamb of God," we miked the guitar in a very unusual way. There were about seven mics set up around me and then more mics set up around the guitar. There were so many mics that I couldn't move an inch. To make things even worse, they put this big blanket over me to deaden the sound. It was so hot under there that I was sweating and couldn't breathe. I knew I'd have to get the part right, or I was going to die if I had to keep doing it over. Luckily, I was able to cut the track quickly.") "Born Again" is the second song on the record to use the synth bass and is the only other song, apart from "The Nobodies", to use the drum machine. The song's guitar tracks were led by Ramirez and supplemented by contributions from John 5. "Burning Flag" is a pounding heavy-metal song reminiscent of American industrial metal band Ministry.

=== M: The Fallen ===
Ramirez and John 5 collaborated on the guitar compositions for "Coma Black"; the song alternates between Ramirez's "warped guitar" and the phaze guitar employed by John 5, with Manson providing additional rhythm guitar support. The album ends with an interlocking group of songs: "Valentine's Day", "The Fall of Adam", "King Kill 33°" and "Count to Six and Die (The Vacuum of Infinite Space Encompassing)" each end abruptly before being instantaneously followed by the introduction of the proceeding track. "Valentine's Day" was composed by Ramirez and Manson and feature Gacy playing the mellotron—the second time the eccentric instrument appears on the record. John 5 recorded guitar parts for "The Fall of Adam" in the pouring rain in an effort to extract a unique sound and deliberately mistuned his Gibson for the song's intro to "produce a sweeter sound." (Note: John 5: "I used a few open tunings for certain parts. In "Godeatgod" I used a very strange tuning -- [low to high] B, D, D, G, B, E, and for the intro of "The Fall Of Adam," I tuned [low to high] F, A, F, Ab, C, F. Having played in a lot of country bands, I've learned that alternate tunings sometimes sound better because the strings ring out on certain chords and produce a sweeter sound.") Bon Harris contributed the piano work for the final song "Count to Six and Die (The Vacuum of Infinite Space Encompassing)" while Gacy exchanged his mellotron for this track in favor of a string synthesizer. It concludes on a cliffhanger; it ends with the sound of a solitary bullet being loaded into a revolver against a background of distant fireworks followed by the chamber being spun repeatedly. Its hammer is cocked six times, although its trigger is pulled only five times. The result of the sixth and final chamber is left for the listener to determine.

== Release and artwork ==
Manson posted a four-minute video clip on the band's website on December 16, 1999, featuring clips of two previously unreleased songs. The first clip was of a rock song which later became "Disposable Teens", while the second was a rough demo of a cover of Frankie Laine and Jimmy Boyd's 1953 single "The Little Boy and the Old Man" (composed by Wayne Shanklin a year earlier as "Little Child"; it was most popularly performed under the title "Mommy Dear" in the 1964 movie The Naked Kiss). As a Valentine's Day gift for fans, Manson posted a download of the band's cover of Charles Manson's "Sick City", from his 1970 album Lie: The Love and Terror Cult. In August, he announced an October 24 release date for the record, and posted a partial track listing containing 13 song titles, while also indicating that their website would be updated weekly. Within three weeks, the album's full track listing had been revealed, and sound files of "Burning Flag", "Cruci-Fiction in Space" and "The Love Song" had been released for free download, along with the cover of the Holy Wood novel.

On September 18, Manson announced that the album's US release would be postponed until November 14 (to fine-tune the final mix), and that its first single would be "Disposable Teens". The album was released on three formats on November 13 in the UK by Nothing and Interscope Records. Versions of the enhanced CD edition released in the UK featured an acoustic version of "The Nobodies" as a bonus track, while Japanese editions also included a live version of "Mechanical Animals". The album was released on double-LP and cassette. Universal Music Japan released a remastered version of the album on Super High Material CD (SHM-CD) on March 23, 2013.

The image was supposed to suggest that something we've taken for granted all our lives can be looked at as violent and sexual as well. So religious people who indict entertainment as being violent, it's kind of ironic because Christ was the first celebrity and all entertainment comes from religion. And my jaw being removed is to represent the silencing of people with dangerous opinions.

— Marilyn Manson, on the controversial album cover.

Artwork for the album was designed by Manson and P. R. Brown. Manson began conceptualizing it as he wrote the songs, and Brown and Manson worked in tandem to realize the imagery after deciding to do the work themselves. The cover art, which portrays Manson as a crucified Christ with his jawbone torn off, is intended as a criticism of censorship and America's obsession with martyrs. It is a cropped reinterpretation of The Hanged Man Tarot card. Underneath is an obscured portion of John F. Kennedy's coroner report, displaying the words "clinical record" and "autopsy". The typeface used on the band's name is the same font used on the Disney World logo in the 1960s.

The cover was controversial; editions of the album sold at Circuit City came housed in a cardboard sleeve featuring an alternative cover, while Walmart and Kmart refused to stock the album at all. A pastor in Memphis, Tennessee, threatened to go on a hunger strike unless the album was pulled from shelves. Manson described these actions as attempts at censorship: "The irony is that my point of the photo on the album was to show people that the crucifixion of Christ is, indeed, a violent image. My jaw is missing as a symbol of this very kind of censorship. This doesn't piss me off as much as it pleases me, because those offended by my album cover have successfully proven my point." In 2008, Gigwise ranked it at number ten on their list of "The 50 Most Controversial Album Covers of All Time".

A set of fourteen redesigned Major Arcana tarot cards, based on the Rider–Waite deck, were commissioned by the singer for the album's artwork. The cards depict band members in surrealistic tableau. Each card was reinterpreted to reflect the iconography of the album's lyrical content: The Fool is stepping off a cliff, with grainy images of Jacqueline Kennedy Onassis and a JFK campaign poster in the background; The Emperor, with prosthetic legs, is sitting in a wheelchair clutching a rifle in front of an American flag; Justice weighs the Bible against the brain on his balance scale. The album's inner sleeve contains these three images, along with a further nine: The Magician, The High Priestess, The Hierophant, The Hermit, Death, The Devil, The Tower, The Star and The World. The cover itself represents The Hanged Man.

== Promotion and singles ==
Three singles were released to promote the album, with "Disposable Teens" being released as its lead single. The band made their debut appearance on BBC One's Top of the Pops to perform the song. Its music video was directed by Samuel Bayer, which debuted on MTV's Total Request Live on October 25. The single was released in the UK on November 6, and featured several B-sides, including covers of Lennon's "Working Class Hero" and The Doors' "Five to One", as well as original tracks "Diamonds & Pollen" and "Astonishing Panorama of the Endtimes". The latter had been released the previous year on the soundtrack to Celebrity Deathmatch. The band performed "Disposable Teens" on the MTV New Year's Eve celebration in 2000, along with a cover of Cheap Trick's "Surrender". It was also performed at the 2001 American Music Awards.

From November 1, the UK division of Interscope held a contest to promote the album. The contest invited fans to log onto the band's website daily to pick up a series of coded clues which led to a hidden message. Fans who solved the riddle received an exclusive download, and were entered into a drawing for a one-week trip for two to meet the band in Hollywood. On November 14, the band took a break from the Guns, God and Government Tour to celebrate the album's US release date with a brief, invitation-only acoustic set at the Saci nightclub in New York City. Tickets for the show were given out via their website, in radio contests, and to the first 100 album buyers at Tower Records on Broadway in New York. The set consisted of four songs, including their cover "Suicide Is Painless" – the theme of the film (and TV series) M*A*S*H – which they had recently contributed to the soundtrack of Book of Shadows: Blair Witch 2. The following day, the vocalist appeared on Total Request Live in a segment entitled "Mothers Against Marilyn Manson".

"The Fight Song" was released as the album's second single on February 19, 2001, in the UK. A remix of the song by Joey Jordison of Slipknot appeared as its B-side. Its music video was directed by Manson and W.I.Z. and sparked controversy for its violent depiction of an American football game between jocks and goths, with NME accusing it of being exploitative of the Columbine tragedy. Manson dismissed the claims as hype, and said: "I'm trying to show that sports as well as music can be seen as violent, so I chose a traditional black vs white, good vs evil theme for the video." Manson appeared on an April 2001 episode of The O'Reilly Factor, where he once again denied that the band's music was responsible for Columbine. Bill O'Reilly argued that "disturbed kids" without direction from responsible parents could misinterpret the message of his music as endorsing the belief that "when I'm dead [then] everybody's going to know me." Manson responded:

Well, I think that's a very valid point and I think that it's a reflection of, not necessarily this programme but of television in general, that if you die and enough people are watching you become a martyr, you become a hero, you become well known. So when you have these things like Columbine, and you have these kids who are angry and they have something to say and no one's listening, the media sends a message that says if you do something loud enough and it gets our attention then you will be famous for it. Those kids ended up on the cover of Time magazine twice, the media gave them exactly what they wanted. That's why I never did any interviews around that time when I was being blamed for it because I didn't want to contribute to something that I found to be reprehensible.

In mid-2001, Universal Music Group was criticized for airing commercials promoting the album during episodes of Total Request Live. Manson suspected that former Democratic vice-presidential candidate Joseph Lieberman played a role in the criticism. Lieberman and Hillary Clinton had recently introduced the Media Marketing Accountability Act of 2001 before the 107th United States Congress. This legislation proposed to ban the entertainment-industry from marketing suspected violent or explicit material to minors.

Manson announced prior to the release of "The Fight Song" that "The Nobodies" would be issued as the album's third single, whilst indicating a desire to film its video in Russia because "the atmosphere, the desolation, the coldness and the architecture would really suit the song." Another early plan was to incorporate the MTV series Jackass, as the song was included in the show's soundtrack. The idea was later abandoned, however, when the show drew the ire of Lieberman. The music video was directed by Paul Fedor and premiered on MTV in June, and the single was released in the UK on September 3. Its release was timed to coincide with the band's appearance at the Reading Festival, and was accompanied by another competition on the band's website—the winner was awarded two full-weekend passes to the festival, as well as unrestricted backstage access and a private sleeping area. A remix of the song later appeared in the 2001 Johnny Depp film From Hell.

=== Tour ===
The album was promoted by the worldwide Guns, God and Government Tour, which began in North America in 3–6,000-capacity venues on October 27, 2000, at the Orpheum Theatre in Minneapolis. Typically for the band, the concerts were highly theatrical. The tour's imagery was mainly derived from the concept and themes found on the album; its logo was a rifle, with handguns arranged to resemble the Christian cross. Sets were designed with communist, religious and "celebritarian" imagery. Manson had a number of costume changes during each show: a bishop's dalmatic and mitre (often confused with papal regalia); a costume made from animals (including epaulettes made from a horse's tail and a shirt made from skinned goat heads and ostrich spines); his signature black leather corset, g-string and garter stockings; an elaborate Roman legionary-style imperial galea; an Allgemeine SS-style peaked police cap; a black-and-white fur coat, and a large conical skirt which lifted him 12 metres (39 ft) in the air.

The Ozzfest leg of the tour marked the band's first performance in Denver, Colorado (on June 22, 2001, at Mile High Stadium) after the Columbine High School massacre in Littleton. After initially canceling due to a scheduling conflict, the band changed their plans to play the Denver date. The group's decision met resistance from conservative groups; Manson received death threats and demands to cancel the band's performance. A group of church leaders, businesses and families related to Columbine formed an ad hoc organization opposing the show. Citizens for Peace and Respect, which was supported by Colorado governor Bill Owens and representative Tom Tancredo, claimed on their website that the band "promotes hate, violence, death, suicide, drug use, and the attitudes and actions of the Columbine killers". In response, Manson issued a statement:

I am truly amazed that after all this time, religious groups still need to attack entertainment and use these tragedies as a pitiful excuse for their own self-serving publicity. In response to their protests, I will provide a show where I balance my songs with a wholesome Bible reading. This way, fans will not only hear my so-called, 'violent' point of view, but we can also examine the virtues of wonderful 'Christian' stories of disease, murder, adultery, suicide and child sacrifice. Now that seems like 'entertainment' to me.

Two films of the concert tour were made. The Guns, God and Government DVD was released on October 29, 2002, by Eagle Rock Entertainment, and featured live footage taken from several different performances in Los Angeles, Russia, Japan, and throughout Europe. It also included a 30-minute behind-the-scenes featurette, The Death Parade, with guest appearances from Ozzy Osbourne and Eminem. This was followed seven years later by a Blu-ray titled Guns, God and Government – Live in L.A. Released by Eagle Rock on November 17, 2009, it depicts the band's entire sixteen-song set from their January 13, 2001, performance at the Grand Olympic Auditorium—the final headlining show of the North American leg of the tour.

== Critical reception ==
Professional ratings
Aggregate scores
Source	Rating
Metacritic	72/100
Review scores
Source	Rating
AllMusic	4.5/5 stars
Billboard	8/10
Drowned in Sound	10/10
Entertainment Weekly	B
LA Weekly	4.5/5 stars
Los Angeles Times	2/4 stars
Melody Maker	4/5 stars
NME	4/5 stars
Q	4/5 stars
Rolling Stone	3.5/5 stars

Holy Wood received generally positive reviews from music critics at the time of its release. At Metacritic, which assigns a normalized rating out of 100 to reviews from mainstream critics, the album received an average score of 72 based on 14 reviews, indicating "generally favorable reviews", and is the 88th best-reviewed album of the year. The record was praised by several publications as being the band's finest work: Stephen Thomas Erlewine of AllMusic described it as their definitive record; a writer for Entertainment Weekly called it their "most potent effort yet", and April Long of NME said it was "by far the best thing Manson has ever set his warped mind to, [it] ultimately inspires something far more potent than fear or hatred—respect."

The band received acclaim for the quality of their songwriting. Daniel Durchholz of Wall of Sound called Holy Wood their most ambitious and musically accomplished record to date. LA Weekly said that "almost all [of the songs] contain a double-take chord change or a textural overdose or a mind-blowing bridge, and they'll be terroristic in concert." Hot Press praised the band for their inventive musical arrangements, and said that "Holy Wood is a far better record than many would have dared to expect." Drowned in Sound rated the album 10 out of 10 and praised the band's performance, saying that they "play tighter than [ever] before (looking at the credits show it to be much more of a team effort) ... and, musically, it has a lot more variation and scope than the Limp Bizkits of the world." The band's vocalist was also applauded for his lyricism; Barry Walters of Rolling Stone commended him for "addressing real-life issues with a theatrical verve and genuine vitriol that no other mainstream act can match." Billboard magazine was similarly impressed, calling Manson one of the most skilled lyricists of his generation. Revolver editor Christopher Scapelliti compared his lyrics to those of John Lennon's, writing: "What comes across loudest on the album is not the music, but the sense of injury expressed in Manson's lyrics. Like Plastic Ono Band, Holy Wood screams with a primal fury that's evident even in its quietest moments."

The album also received some mixed reviews. Several publications criticized its length, as well as the band for abandoning the glam rock-influenced production of Mechanical Animals. PopMatters argued that the album was too long, and claimed it would have been a more consistent record if subject matter was addressed literally, instead of through a 'concept album' format. Joshua Klein of The A.V. Club rated Holy Wood a B−, but was overall critical of the lack of glam rock-influenced songs on the album. Robert Hilburn, in a review for the Los Angeles Times, was also disappointed that the album did not live up to "the promise of Mechanical Animals". He viewed the musical cross-pollination of Antichrist Superstar and Mechanical Animals as confusion on the band's part as to which of the two albums appealed most to casual listeners.

=== Accolades ===
A decade on, there has still not been as eloquent and savage a musical attack on the media and mainstream culture as Manson achieved with Holy Wood... perhaps that's where Holy Wood achieved its greatest success. In deflecting the attention that was targeted at him back onto the media, they reacted exactly as he knew they would: by blustering and further exposing their own inadequacies ... The shame of it all, though, is that so little has changed. That the album is still so relevant today suggests it failed in its task of changing attitudes. That it exists at all, though, is a credit to a man who refused to sit and take it, but instead come out swinging.

— Kerrang!, on the impact of Holy Wood (In the Shadow of the Valley of Death)

The album appeared in numerous publication's lists of best albums of 2000. It appeared at number nine on Kerrang!'s list of albums of the year, and went on to rate it the 11th best album of the 2000–2009 decade, while NME ranked it at number 34 in their critic's pick of the 50 best albums of 2000 in their "Decade in Music" series. German magazine Musik Express/Sounds listed the album at number 30 in their critics' top 50, and at number nine in the popular poll of their "Albums of 2000" list. The French edition of British magazine Rock Sound ranked Holy Wood 15th in their Le choix de la rédaction (editors choice) and 5th in Le choix des lecteurs (readers choice) of their 2000 Albums de l'année (albums of the year). Record Collector also included it on their "Best of 2000" list. It went on to win the "Best Album" accolade at the 2001 Kerrang! Awards.

Retrospective commentary on the album has been highly positive. In November 2010, Kerrang! published a tenth-anniversary commemorative issue dedicated to Holy Wood titled Screaming For Vengeance, calling it "Manson's finest hour". In 2014, Metal Hammer identified the album as a modern classic, calling it the band's "creative zenith"; later, in 2020, the magazine named it one of the 20 best metal albums of 2000. Manson said in a June 2015 Reddit AMA that he considered the record to be his best work, and, that same month, NME referred to it as the band's best album. A 2016 feature in Houston Press called Holy Wood "the album that really cemented the band as more than just shock-rockers, but true musical mavericks with an intelligent perspective on social issues." Metal Hammer referred to the record as "perfect", saying: "Manson has yet to better Holy Wood and that's fine—nobody's really bettered it. The flow of the record, the delivery of its concept, the clarity with which it strikes its opponents. A gargantuan artistic feat that will go down in history as Manson's defining statement."

== Commercial performance ==
Prior to the record's release, several critics and retailers openly questioned whether the band still had significant commercial appeal with mainstream consumers, with rap rock emerging as the predominant rock genre of the early 2000s. Furthermore, according to Metal Hammer, "By the turn of the century, Manson was no longer America's demon dog. White trash superstar Eminem had clocked his position and supplanted him." A clean version of the album was never manufactured. This resulted in Holy Wood being banned from sale at major retailers such as Walmart and Kmart, who enforce a strict policy on not stocking albums labeled with a Parental Advisory sticker. Best Buy's sales projections estimated its first-week sales at about 150,000 units nationally, significantly less than the 223,000 copies sold by Mechanical Animals during its first week.

Holy Wood debuted and peaked at number 13 on the Billboard 200 with first-week sales of 117,279—an initial commercial disappointment. It spent 13 consecutive weeks on the chart before dropping off – far short of the 52 and 33 weeks Antichrist Superstar and Mechanical Animals spent on the chart, respectively – making it the shortest-charting full-length LP by the band until The High End of Low (2009). It took over two years to be certified gold by the RIAA (in March 2003), denoting shipments in excess of 500,000 units. The album sold over 573,000 copies in the US by 2010, according to Nielsen SoundScan. Manson attributed its lack of commercial appeal to the musical climate of the time, and argued that, at the height of the band's popularity, their US album sales peaked between one and two million units, so "it's not such a disaster as if we were coming down from seven or eight million records." He also said that the drop in US sales was off-set by increasing international success.

The record reached the top 20 of numerous international markets, including Canada, where it peaked at number 13 and was certified gold by the CRIA for shipments of over 50,000 units. The record was more successful in continental Europe than preceding albums, peaking at number nine on Billboard's Eurochart. It entered the top 10 of the national charts in Austria, Italy, and Sweden, and the top 20 in a further six countries: France, Norway, Poland, and Spain. It debuted at number 11 on the German Albums Chart and spent over five months on the chart—their second-longest chart run there, behind The Golden Age of Grotesque (2003). It also reached the top 20 in Switzerland, where it was certified gold by the IFPI almost five years after its release for shipments in excess of 25,000 units. Similarly, despite peaking at number 23 and spending just four weeks on the UK Albums Chart, it would be certified gold by the BPI in July 2013 for sales in excess of 100,000 copies.

In Australasia, Holy Wood peaked at number eight on the Australian Albums Chart, and reached the top twenty in New Zealand, peaking at number 18. The album also peaked at number 13 on the Japanese Oricon chart, where it was certified gold by the Recording Industry Association of Japan for shipments of over 100,000 units.

== Track listing ==
All lyrics written by Marilyn Manson.

A: In the Shadow
No.	Title	Music	Length
1.	"GodEatGod"	Manson	2:34
2.	"The Love Song"	Twiggy Ramirez; John 5	3:16
3.	"The Fight Song"	5	2:55
4.	"Disposable Teens"	5; Ramirez	3:01

D: The Androgyne
No.	Title	Music	Length
5.	"Target Audience (Narcissus Narcosis)"	Ramirez; 5	4:18
6.	""President Dead""	Ramirez; 5; Madonna Wayne Gacy	3:13
7.	"In the Shadow of the Valley of Death"	Ramirez; 5	4:07
8.	"Cruci-Fiction in Space"	Ramirez; 5; Gacy	4:56
9.	"A Place in the Dirt"	5	3:37

A: Of Red Earth
No.	Title	Music	Length
10.	"The Nobodies"	Manson; 5	3:35
11.	"The Death Song"	5; Manson	3:29
12.	"Lamb of God"	Ramirez	4:39
13.	"Born Again"	Ramirez; 5	3:20
14.	"Burning Flag"	Ramirez; 5	3:21

M: The Fallen
No.	Title	Music	Length
15.	"Coma Black" a) "Eden Eye" b) "The Apple of Discord"	Manson; 5; Ramirez	5:58 4:26 1:32
16.	"Valentine's Day"	Ramirez; Manson	3:31
17.	"The Fall of Adam"	Ramirez; 5	2:34
18.	"King Kill 33º"	Ramirez	2:18
19.	"Count to Six and Die (The Vacuum of Infinite Space Encompassing)"	5	3:23
Total length:			68:16

Holy Wood (In the Shadow of the Valley of Death) – UK bonus track
No.	Title	Music	Length
20.	"The Nobodies" (Acoustic Version)	Manson; 5	3:35

Holy Wood (In the Shadow of the Valley of Death) – Japanese bonus tracks
No.	Title	Music	Length
20.	"The Nobodies" (Acoustic Version)	Manson; 5	3:35
21.	"Mechanical Animals" (Live Version)	Manson; Ramirez; Zim Zum	4:41

Notes

- While consisting of four cycles, the album was released as a single disc, similar to the three cycles of 1996's Antichrist Superstar.
- Enhanced CD editions of the album contain a data track of a video titled "Autopsy".

== Personnel ==
Credits adapted from the liner notes of the vinyl edition of Holy Wood (In the Shadow of the Valley of Death).

Marilyn Manson

- Marilyn Manson – lead vocals, backing vocals, keyboards (track 1), synthesizer (track 1), synthesizer bass (tracks 1, 13), lead guitar (track 2), optigan (track 5), mellotron (track 6), syncussion (track 6), distorted flute (track 7), piano (tracks 8, 12, 16), ambient effects (track 9), electric harpsichord (track 10), minipiano (track 12), rhythm guitar (track 15), arrangements, production, art direction, concept
- Twiggy Ramirez – lead guitar (tracks 1, 5, 12–16), bass (tracks 2–18), rhythm guitar (tracks 6, 8, 16), Leslie guitar (track 12), keyboards (track 12), drum loops (track 12), warped guitar (track 15), additional electric guitar (tracks 2, 15)
- John 5 – guitars (tracks 1–18), lead guitar (tracks 3, 6, 8), rhythm guitar (tracks 3, 6, 8, 12, 15, 17), acoustic guitar (tracks 9, 12, 17), slide guitar (track 9), phaze guitar (track 15), synth guitar (tracks 17–18)
- Madonna Wayne Gacy – ambiance (tracks 1, 8, 10, 12, 15, 19), keyboards (tracks 2–9, 13–16, 18), samples (tracks 2, 11), loops (tracks 3, 8), synthesizer (tracks 5, 15, 18), synthesizer bass (track 9), mellotron (track 16), synth string (track 19)
- Ginger Fish – live drums (tracks 2–12, 14–18), siren loop (track 2), drum loops (tracks 5, 6, 9, 11, 15, 16), death loop (track 7), drum machine (tracks 10, 13)

Production

- P.R. Brown – art direction, design, photography
- Greg Fidelman – engineer, Pro Tools
- Kevin Guarnieri – assistant engineer
- Bon Harris – pre-production editing, programming, synthesizer (tracks 1, 2, 4, 5, 9, 12, 14, 16), drum programming (tracks 2, 5, 13, 14), electronic percussion (track 4), insect hi-hat (track 8), sleigh bells (tracks 9), manipulation (tracks 9, 14), synthesizer bass (track 11, 13), piano (track 19)
- Stephen Marcussen – mastering (at Marcussen Mastering, Hollywood)
- Paulie Northfield – additional engineering
- Nick Raskulinecz – assistant engineer
- Danny Saber – additional loops (track 13)
- Dave Sardy – rhythm guitar (track 1), drum programming (track 13), production, mixing
- Alex Suttle – backing vocals (track 6)
- Joe Zook – assistant engineer

== Charts and certifications ==
=== Weekly charts ===
Chart (2000–2025)	Peak position
Australian Albums (ARIA)	8
Austrian Albums (Ö3 Austria)	6
Belgian Albums (Ultratop Flanders)	34
Belgian Albums (Ultratop Wallonia)	29
Canadian Albums (Billboard)	13
Dutch Albums (MegaCharts)	53
European Albums (Billboard)	9
Finnish Albums (Suomen virallinen lista)	25
French Albums (SNÉP)	12
German Albums (Offizielle Top 100)	11
Greek Albums (IFPI)	65
Irish Albums (IRMA)	21
Italian Albums (FIMI)	7
Japanese Albums (Oricon)	13
New Zealand Albums (RMNZ)	18
Norwegian Albums (VG-lista)	12
Polish Albums (ZPAV)	14
Scottish Albums (OCC)	17
Spanish Albums (Promúsicae)	14
Swedish Albums (Sverigetopplistan)	7
Swiss Albums (Schweizer Hitparade)	20
UK Albums (OCC)	23
UK Rock & Metal Albums (OCC)	3
US Billboard 200	13

Chart (2025)	Peak position
Greek Albums (IFPI)	65

=== Certifications ===
Region	Certification	Certified units/sales
Canada (Music Canada)	Gold	50,000^{^}
Germany (BVMI)	Gold	150,000^{‡}
Japan (RIAJ)	Gold	100,000^{^}
Switzerland (IFPI Switzerland)	Gold	25,000^{^}
United Kingdom (BPI)	Gold	100,000^{^}
United States (RIAA)	Gold	573,000
^{^} Shipments figures based on certification alone.^{‡} Sales+streaming figures based on certification alone.

== Release history ==
Region	Date	Format	Label	Catalog #	Ref.
Japan	November 11, 2000	CD; LP; Cassette	Nothing; Interscope	UICS-1002	
United Kingdom	November 13, 2000	CD; LP; Cassette	Nothing; Interscope	490 859-2	
United States	November 14, 2000	CD; LP; Cassette	Nothing; Interscope	490 790-2	
Japan	March 23, 2013	SHM-CD	Universal Music	UICY-25382	
