= Guns, God and Government Tour =

2000–01 concert tour by Marilyn Manson

- Tour by Marilyn Manson
- Promotional poster for the January 31 performance of the Guns, God and Government Tour
- Associated album: Holy Wood (In the Shadow of the Valley of Death)
- Start date: October 27, 2000
- End date: September 2, 2001
- No. of shows: 109 (planned); 107 (completed)

Marilyn Manson concert chronology
- Rock Is Dead Tour (1999); Guns, God and Government (2000–2001) Ozzfest Tour (2001); Grotesk Burlesk Tour (2003–2004)

Guns, God and Government was a worldwide arena tour by American rock band Marilyn Manson. It was the eighth tour the band embarked upon and the fourth to span over multiple legs. It was launched 17 days ahead in support of their fourth full-length studio album, Holy Wood (In the Shadow of the Valley of Death), which was released on November 14, 2000, in the US and Australia. Beginning on October 27, 2000, and lasting until September 2, 2001, the tour included six legs spanning Eurasia, Japan and North America with a total of 107 completed shows out of 109 planned.

The show began in Minneapolis' Orpheum Theatre. The shows drew numerous protesters and resistance from civic and church leaders as well as other elements of local communities. The contentious Denver show, during the Ozzfest leg of the Guns, God and Government Tour, was also featured during Marilyn Manson's interview in Michael Moore's 2002 documentary film Bowling for Columbine.

== Performance and show themes ==
Typical of the band, the concerts were extremely theatrical. An average show lasted for 1 hour and 40 minutes and the sets were designed with Cold War, religious and "Celebritarian" imagery in mind.

Manson has several costume changes throughout the sets ranging from a Bishop's dalmatic and mitre (often confused for Papal regalia), a costume made from taxidermied animal anatomies (i.e. an epaulette made from a horse's tail, a shirt made from skinned goat heads and ostrich spines), an elaborate Roman legionary-style Imperial galea, an Allgemeine SS-style peaked police cap, his signature black leather corset, g-string and garter stocking ensemble, a black-and-white fur coat and a giant rising conical skirt that lifts the singer 12 meters (40 feet) into the air.

When being introduced, Manson was pulled onstage on a steampunk variation of a Roman chariot by two naked girls, in a bigae formation, wearing stylized Roman horse masks. After dismounting from the chariot wearing a skirted version of his signature black leather bondage ensemble, replete with the Imperial gallic, a burst of heavy fireworks would signal the beginning of the first song.

During performances of "The Love Song", Manson would wear the Bishop's outfit, which would then be discarded to reveal his signature black leather bondage ensemble. During performances of "Valentine's Day", Manson would perform, wearing the same Bishop's attire, kneeled behind a prayer kneeler that is bookended with two severed heads bearing his own likeness.

During some shows, there would be two dancers onstage. The rostrum that was used in previous tours during performances of "Antichrist Superstar" also returned, this time sporting a new design of a crucifix made of guns, instead of the lightning bolt symbol previously used. During the February 24, 2001 show in Moscow, Russia, two Russian military guards were asked to stand on each side of the podium as Manson sang "The Love Song", replete with his Allgemeine SS-style peaked police cap.

In performances of "Cruci-Fiction in Space", Manson would be lifted 12 meters (40 feet) into the air on a platform hidden by the giant conical skirt, much like in the "Disposable Teens" video. Images would often be displayed in the stage backdrop, including a parody of the Hollywood Sign rewritten as "Holy Wood", the cover for the "Disposable Teens" single, and a scorched American flag.

== Incidents ==
The inaugural North American leg of the Guns, God and Government Tour suffered two separate cancellations. On November 25, 2000, during the band's performance at the Hammerstein Ballroom in New York City, Marilyn Manson drummer Ginger Fish suffered a broken collarbone after falling from his drum riser during the band's stage-trashing finale. The drummer was escorted to hospital by the band's manager where he was treated and released. According to an Interscope spokesperson, the band is not expected to miss any dates due to the injury and that Fish will play with his injured arm in a sling. However, on December 5, 2000, the band cancelled their scheduled performance, at the Toledo Sports Arena in Toledo, Ohio, ten minutes before the doors opened due to Fish reaggravating his injured collarbone.

The band was also forced to cancel their scheduled performance at the Omaha Civic Auditorium on December 12, 2000, after a storm inundated Peoria, Illinois, where the band performed on December 11, 2000, at the Peoria Civic Center, with 9 inches (23 cm) of snow and blizzard-condition winds, preventing the band from being able to travel.

=== Protests and controversy ===
On November 19, 2000, Christian activists unsuccessfully attempted to have the band's performance at the Blue Cross Arena in Rochester, New York cancelled. Thus, the show was attended by demonstrators who harassed concert-goers waiting in line by shouting and chanting "Why do you follow the devil?" The city was forced to send a number of policemen, some on horseback, to monitor the situation. Clips from the show were made available on the band's official website (though it is no longer present).

Marilyn Manson's performance in Denver, Colorado on June 22, 2001, at the Mile High Stadium also drew attention from the national news media. The event was part of their commitments with the heavy metal festival tour Ozzfest and marked the band's first performance in the state since the Columbine High School massacre in nearby Littleton, Colorado on April 20, 1999. The band was initially blamed for inciting shooters Eric Harris and Dylan Klebold into killing their classmates, though these reports would later be proven to be false. The band initially pulled out due to scheduling conflicts, however, the group later altered their plans in order to accommodate the Denver date. The band met heavy resistance from conservative groups and the performer received numerous death threats and calls to skip the date. A group of church leaders and families related to the Columbine tragedy formed an organization specifically to oppose their show called 'Citizens for Peace and Respect', which drew the support of Colorado governor Bill Owens (R-Colo) and representative Tom Tancredo (R-Colo). The group held a rally outside the Mile High Stadium where organizer, youth pastor Jason Janz, delivered a speech stating, "If Marilyn Manson can walk into our town, promote hate, violence, suicide, death, drug use and Columbine-like behavior, I can say, 'Not without a fight you can't.'" Janz further said, "We don't think Manson caused Columbine, but he encourages and legitimizes Columbine-like behavior." Marilyn Manson responded to the assertions of 'Citizens for Peace and Respect' by issuing a statement saying,

I am truly amazed that after all this time, religious groups still need to attack entertainment and use these tragedies as a pitiful excuse for their own self-serving publicity. In response to their protests, I will provide a show where I balance my songs with a wholesome Bible reading. This way, fans will not only hear my so-called, 'violent' point of view, but we can also examine the virtues of wonderful 'Christian' stories of disease, murder, adultery, suicide and child sacrifice. Now that seems like 'entertainment' to me.

— Marilyn Manson

A group of Marilyn Manson supporters also responded to 'Citizens for Peace and Respect' by forming an organization called 'Citizens for the Protection of the Right to Free Speech'. The group held a rally in front of the Colorado State Capitol where organizer Carrieanne Andrews, a mother of three, stated that "We just wanted to show that Jason Janz does not speak for our entire community" and that they resented "being told how to be good parents." The Denver show would later provide the backdrop for Manson's landmark interview on America's climate of fear and culture of gun violence in Michael Moore's 2002 documentary Bowling for Columbine. When Moore asked what he would have said if he had the opportunity to speak to the students at Columbine, he replied, "I wouldn't say a single word. I would listen to what they have to say and that's what no one did."

Another incident took place leading up to The Gig On The Green festival on August 25, 2001, in Glasgow, Scotland. Members of the Glasgow community were calling for Marilyn Manson's performance at the festival to be boycotted. Beth Nimmo, the mother of the Columbine killer's first victim, Rachel Scott, joined in the protests and told Scottish tabloid newspaper Daily Record on August 8, 2001, "I don't doubt that his kind of music definitely affects young people and can desensitize them. People need to be strong enough not to listen to it. There is nothing entertaining about real violence. It has real consequences and brings nothing but destruction and pain." In a separate incident, a Catholic Charismatic Renewal group protested in early August 2001 at the Glasgow city centre, where the Glasgow City Council were deciding on the final licensing application for Gig On The Green. This was due to the inclusion of both Eminem and Marilyn Manson on the bill. Both attempts failed.

=== Lawsuits ===
In a civil battery suit, David Diaz, a security officer from a concert in Minneapolis, on October 27, 2000, sued for $75,000 in a Minneapolis federal court. The federal court jury found in Manson's favor.

In a civil suit presented by Oakland County, Michigan, Manson was charged with sexual misconduct against another security officer, Joshua Keasler, during a concert in Clarkston, Michigan, on July 30, 2001. Oakland County originally filed assault and battery and criminal sexual misconduct charges, but the judge reduced the latter charge to misdemeanor disorderly conduct. Manson pleaded no contest to the reduced charges, paid a $4,000 fine, and later settled the lawsuit under undisclosed terms.

=== Arrests ===
On February 5, 2001, Marilyn Manson was arrested by the Italian police following the band's performance at the Palaghiaccio in Marino, Italy in relation to the controversy surrounding the Milan court case of the stabbing death of a nun by two girls. Following a police raid on the home of the two suspects, Italian police uncovered images of crucifixes, pentagrams and Marilyn Manson lyrics. The band leader, however, was let go due to a lack of evidence that the perpetrators were inspired by the group's music to carry out their actions.

The next day, Manson was arrested again following the group's show at the Palamalaguti in Bologna, Italy. This time, the singer was charged with public indecency relating to the group's June 20, 1999 performance at the Heineken Jammin' Festival in Imola, Italy during their Rock Is Dead Tour two years prior.

== Setlist ==
Though minor changes were made to the setlist throughout the tour, these were the typical setlists for headline shows and festivals (where the band had less time to play) respectively.

Headline Tours

Count to Six and Die (Intro)

- "Irresponsible Hate Anthem"
- "The Death Song"
- "Disposable Teens"
- "Great Big White World"
- "Tourniquet"
- "The Fight Song"
- "The Nobodies"
- "My Monkey"
- "Lunchbox"
- "Rock is Dead"
- "The Dope Show"
- "Cruci-Fiction in Space"
- "Burning Flag"
- "Sweet Dreams (Are Made of This)"
- "Valentine's Day"
- "The Love Song"
- "The Beautiful People"
- "1996"
Festival Tours

God Bless America (Intro)

- "Irresponsible Hate Anthem"
- "The Reflecting God"
- "Disposable Teens"
- "The Fight Song"
- "The Nobodies"
- "Rock is Dead"
- "The Dope Show"
- "Cruci-Fiction in Space"
- "Sweet Dreams (Are Made of This)"
- "The Love Song"
- "Rock n Roll Nigger"
- "Antichrist Superstar"
- "The Beautiful People"

== Lineup ==
Marilyn Manson

- Marilyn Manson: Vocals
- John 5: Guitar
- Twiggy Ramirez: Bass
- Madonna Wayne Gacy: Keyboards
- Ginger Fish: Drums

Supporting acts

- gODHEAD
- The Union Underground
- Cold
- Disturbed
- Professional Murder Music (Portland and Seattle only)

== Critical reception ==
Professional ratings
Review scores
Source	Rating
Los Angeles Times	2/4 stars

UK magazine Kerrang! praised "[the Guns, God and Government Tour,] honed by the best part of four months playing the enormodromes of America, is the greatest spectacle this side of a New Year's fireworks display [...] this is rock n' roll reinvented as grand theatre." Robert Hilburn of the Los Angeles Times, however, found himself unimpressed with the "tired sound and cheap theatrics" of this tour, commenting, "Manson can go on teasing his fan base with his Grand Guignol circus show, but it's hard to imagine in the age of Eminem and other hard-core rappers that he is still even in the Top 10 on parents' most-feared list. That makes him seem severely dated—and he doesn't do much to correct the impression. For someone with the ambition and possibly the talent to be the new David Bowie, Manson appears resolved to settling for the new Alice Cooper. Manson is a smart, articulate, likable guy. He's too talented to be wasting his time chasing the ghost of Alice Cooper."

== Broadcasts & Recordings ==
Two concert films depicting the worldwide tour were recorded. The Guns, God and Government DVD was released on October 29, 2002, by Eagle Rock Entertainment and features live concert footage culled from performances in Los Angeles, Europe, Russia and Japan. It also includes a 30-minute behind-the-scenes featurette titled The Death Parade with guest appearances from Ozzy Osbourne and Eminem. Seven years later it was followed by Guns, God and Government – Live in L.A. Released in Blu-ray format by Eagle Rock Entertainment division Eagle Records on November 17, 2009, it depicts the sixteen song set of the Los Angeles, but does not include 'The Death Song'.

== Tour dates ==
List of concerts, showing date, city, country, and venue
Date	City	Country	Venue	Opening Act(s)	Attendance	Revenue
North America
October 27, 2000	Minneapolis	United States	Orpheum Theatre	n/a	—	—
October 28, 2000	Milwaukee	United States	Eagles Ballroom	n/a	—	—
October 30, 2000	St. Louis	United States	Fox Theatre	n/a	—	—
October 31, 2000	Kansas City	United States	Kansas International Raceway	n/a	—	—
November 2, 2000	Tulsa	United States	Brady Theatre	n/a	—	—
November 3, 2000	Houston	United States	Aerial Theatre	n/a	—	—
November 4, 2000	New Orleans	United States	State Palace Theatre	n/a	—	—
November 6, 2000	Charlotte	United States	Independence Arena	n/a	—	—
November 7, 2000	Atlanta	United States	Tabernacle	n/a	—	—
November 9, 2000	Orlando	United States	Hard Rock Live	n/a	—	—
November 10, 2000	Tampa	United States	USF Sundome	n/a	—	—
November 11, 2000	Sunrise	United States	Sunrise Musical Theatre	n/a	—	—
November 13, 2000	Greensboro	United States	War Memorial Auditorium	n/a	—	—
November 15, 2000	Philadelphia	United States	Electric Factory Ballroom	n/a	—	—
November 16, 2000	Philadelphia	United States	Electric Factory Ballroom	n/a	—	—
November 18, 2000	Toronto	Canada	Massey Hall	n/a	—	—
November 19, 2000	Rochester	United States	Blue Cross Arena	n/a	—	—
November 21, 2000	Fairfax	United States	Patriot Center	n/a	—	—
November 22, 2000	Lowell	United States	Tsongas Arena	n/a	—	—
November 24, 2000	New York City	United States	Hammerstein Ballroom	n/a	—	—
November 25, 2000	New York City	United States	Hammerstein Ballroom	n/a	—	—
November 28, 2000	Detroit	United States	State Theatre	n/a	—	—
November 29, 2000	Detroit	United States	Cobo Arena	n/a	—	—
December 1, 2000	Madison	United States	Dane County Expo	n/a	—	—
December 2, 2000	Chicago	United States	UIC Pavilion	n/a	—	—
December 4, 2000	Indianapolis	United States	Murat Center	n/a	—	—
~~December 5, 2000~~	~~Toledo~~	United States	~~Toledo Sports Arena~~ (Cancelled)	n/a	—	—
December 7, 2000	Columbus	United States	Veterans Memorial Auditorium	n/a	—	—
December 8, 2000	Cleveland	United States	CSU Convocation Center	n/a	—	—
December 9, 2000	Pittsburgh	United States	Mellon Arena	n/a	—	—
December 11, 2000	Peoria	United States	Peoria Civic Center	n/a	—	—
~~December 12, 2000~~	~~Omaha~~	United States	~~Omaha Civic Auditorium~~ (Cancelled)	n/a	—	—
December 13, 2000	Valley Center	United States	Kansas Coliseum	n/a	—	—
December 15, 2000	San Antonio	United States	Freeman Coliseum	n/a	—	—
December 16, 2000	Dallas	United States	Bronco Bowl	n/a	—	—
January 3, 2001	Vancouver	Canada	Queen Elizabeth Theatre	n/a	—	—
January 5, 2001	Portland	United States	Arlene Schnitzer Concert Hall	n/a	—	—
January 6, 2001	Seattle	United States	Mercer Arena	n/a	—	—
January 10, 2001	San Jose	United States	Event Center Arena	n/a	—	—
January 11, 2001	Santa Barbara	United States	Arlington Theater	n/a	—	—
January 13, 2001	Los Angeles	United States	Universal Amphitheatre	n/a	—	—
Europe (Spring)
January 21, 2001	Birmingham	England	National Exhibition Centre	n/a	—	—
January 22, 2001	Manchester	England	Evening News Arena	n/a	—	—
January 24, 2001	London	England	Docklands Arena	n/a	—	—
January 25, 2001	Paris	France	Zénith de Paris	n/a	—	—
January 27, 2001	Bilbao	Spain	Pabellón de La Casilla	n/a	—	—
January 28, 2001	Barcelona	Spain	Pavelló de la Vall d'Hebron	n/a	—	—
January 31, 2001	Hamburg	Germany	Alsterdorfer Sporthalle	n/a	—	—
February 1, 2001	Cologne	Germany	Palladium	n/a	—	—
February 3, 2001	Milan	Italy	Fila Forum	n/a	—	—
February 5, 2001	Marino	Italy	Palaghiaccio di Marino	n/a	—	—
February 6, 2001	Bologna	Italy	PalaMalaguti	n/a	—	—
February 8, 2001	Zürich	Switzerland	Hallenstadion	n/a	—	—
February 10, 2001	Vienna	Austria	Libro Music Hall	n/a	—	—
February 11, 2001	Prague	Czech Republic	Paegas Arena	n/a	—	—
February 13, 2001	Warsaw	Poland	Torwar Hall	n/a	—	—
February 15, 2001	Berlin	Germany	Velodrom	n/a	—	—
February 16, 2001	Copenhagen	Denmark	Forum Copenhagen	n/a	—	—
February 17, 2001	Oslo	Norway	Oslo Spektrum	n/a	—	—
February 19, 2001	Stockholm	Sweden	Ice Stadium	n/a	—	—
February 21, 2001	Helsinki	Finland	Helsinki Ice Hall	n/a	—	—
February 24, 2001	Moscow	Russia	Olympic Stadium (Rescheduled from February 23, 2001)	n/a	—	—
Asia (Spring)
March 11, 2001	Tokyo	Japan	Tokyo International Forum	n/a	—	—
March 13, 2001	Osaka	Japan	Osaka Castle Hall	n/a	—	—
March 14, 2001	Nagoya	Japan	Nagoya Century Hall	n/a	—	—
March 15, 2001	Fukuoka	Japan	Fukuoka Sun Place	n/a	—	—
March 17, 2001	Hiroshima	Japan	Hiroshima Sun Plaza Hall	n/a	—	—
March 19, 2001	Tokyo	Japan	NK Hall	n/a	—	—
March 20, 2001	Tokyo	Japan	NK Hall	n/a	—	—
March 22, 2001	Nagoya	Japan	Nagoya Century Hall	n/a	—	—
Ozzfest
June 8, 2001	Tinley Park	United States	New World Music Theatre	none	—	—
June 9, 2001	East Troy	United States	Alpine Valley Music Theatre	none	—	—
June 12, 2001	Noblesville	United States	Verizon Wireless Music Center	none	—	—
June 13, 2001	Noblesville	United States	Verizon Wireless Music Center	none	—	—
June 18, 2001	Maryland Heights	United States	Riverport Amphitheater	none	—	—
June 19, 2001	Bonner Springs	United States	Sandstone Amphitheater	none	—	—
June 22, 2001	Denver	United States	Mile High Stadium	none	—	—
June 25, 2001	George	United States	The Gorge Amphitheatre	none	—	—
June 27, 2001	Wheatland	United States	Sacramento Valley Amphitheatre	none	—	—
June 30, 2001	Devore	United States	G.H. Blockbuster Pavilion	none	—	—
July 3, 2001	Selma	United States	Verizon Wireless Amphitheater	none	—	—
July 5, 2001	Dallas	United States	Smirnoff Music Center	none	—	—
July 7, 2001	Atlanta	United States	HiFi Buys Amphitheatre	none	—	—
July 13, 2001	West Palm Beach	United States	Mars Music Amphitheater	none	—	—
July 14, 2001	St. Petersburg	United States	Tropicana Field	none	—	—
July 17, 2001	Charlotte	United States	Verizon Wireless Amphitheater	none	—	—
July 20, 2001	Bristow	United States	Nissan Pavilion	none	—	—
July 21, 2001	Camden	United States	Blockbuster Sony-E Center	none	—	—
July 24, 2001	Toronto	Canada	The Docks	none	—	—
July 26, 2001	Cuyahoga Falls	United States	Blossom Music Center	none	—	—
July 28, 2001	Burgettstown	United States	Post-Gazette Pavilion	none	—	—
July 30, 2001	Clarkston	United States	DTE Energy Music Theatre	none	—	—
July 31, 2001	Clarkston	United States	DTE Energy Music Theatre	none	—	—
August 3, 2001	Columbus	United States	Polaris Amphitheater	none	—	—
August 5, 2001	Hartford	United States	Meadows Music Theatre	none	—	—
August 7, 2001	Mansfield	United States	Tweeter Center for the Performing Arts	none	—	—
August 8, 2001	Mansfield	United States	Tweeter Center for the Performing Arts	none	—	—
August 11, 2001	Holmdel Township	United States	PNC Bank Arts Center	none	—	—
August 12, 2001	Holmdel Township	United States	PNC Bank Arts Center	none	—	—
Asia (Autumn)
August 18, 2001	Osaka	Japan	Summer Sonic Festival	n/a	—	—
August 19, 2001	Tokyo	Japan	Summer Sonic Festival	n/a	—	—
Europe (Autumn)
August 22, 2001	Porto	Portugal	Ilha do Ermal Festival	n/a	—	—
August 24, 2001	Leeds	England	Carling Weekender	n/a	—	—
August 25, 2001	Glasgow	Scotland	The Gig on the Green	n/a	—	—
August 26, 2001	Reading	England	Reading Festival	n/a	—	—
August 29, 2001	Ljubljana	Slovenia	Rock Festival	n/a	—	—
August 30, 2001	Vienna	Austria	2 Days a Week	n/a	—	—
September 1, 2001	Konstanz	Germany	Rock am See	n/a	—	—
September 2, 2001	Hildesheim	Germany	M'era Luna Festival	n/a	—	—
