= Holy Wood (novel) =

Novel by Marilyn Manson

- The supposed cover art; posted on the internet by Manson in 2000.
- Author: Marilyn Manson
- Language: English
- Genre: Novel, Satire
- Publisher: Unpublished
- Publication date: Unreleased
- Publication place: United States
- Preceded by: The Long Hard Road Out of Hell (1998)
- Followed by: -

Holy Wood is an unpublished novel by Marilyn Manson, written between 1999 and 2000 (although Manson has claimed to have been writing selections since 1995). Initially envisioned as a companion piece to the album Holy Wood (In the Shadow of the Valley of Death), it remained unreleased after a series of delays, alleged by Manson to have been caused by a "publishing war".

== Plot ==
Describing the plot of the novel itself, Manson said: "The whole story, if you take it from the beginning, is parallel to my own, but just told in metaphors and different symbols that I thought other people could draw from. It's about being innocent and naive, much like Adam was in Paradise before they fall from grace. And seeing something like Hollywood, which I used as a metaphor to represent what people think is the perfect world, and it's about wanting — your whole life — to fit into this world that doesn't think you belong, that doesn't like you, that beats you down every step of the way, fighting and fighting and fighting, and finally getting there, everyone around you are the same people who kept you down in the first place. So you automatically hate everyone around you. You resent them for making you become part of this game you don't realize you were buying into. You trade one prison cell for another in some ways. That becomes the revolution, to be idealistic enough that you think you can change the world, and what you find is you can't change anything but yourself."

Manson has also stated that there is a character "that's very much a take on Walt Disney," who was a big inspiration in the writing of both the book and its accompanying album. In describing the setting, he compared Holy Wood, the place, to Disney World: "I thought of how interesting it would be if we created an entire city that was an amusement park, and the thing we were being amused by was violence and sex and everything that people really want to see."

== Background information ==
=== Early talk of the book and film project ===
In early June 1999, Manson stated at the MTV Movie Awards that he was writing a film script but refused to be drawn into discussion over its contents. By the next month however it became known that New Line Cinema had approved Holy Wood and that Manson was writing the script with the help of writer Robert Pargi. At the 1999 MTV Europe Music Awards in Dublin, Ireland, on November 11, where the band was slated to perform, Manson revealed to MTV News' John Norris the title of his then-unrevealed film project and his hopes for it "[to] go into production sometime in the next year." Manson also met with Chilean avant-garde filmmaker Alejandro Jodorowsky at the event to discuss the possibility of working on the film. However, no final decision was made. Central to the idea was a starring role for Manson's then-fiancée Rose McGowan.

By February 29, 2000, however, the project was postponed as Manson feared the film had been tweaked in ways that would have ruined his artistic vision. Plans were made to first release the album in the autumn and to follow it in 2001 with the novel which Manson called "graphic and phantasmagoric," stemming back to an idea he first began to draft in 1995. The book was a novelized adaptation of the script intended to be released shortly after the record by HarperCollins division ReganBooks. The style was modeled on and inspired by the authors William S. Burroughs, Kurt Vonnegut, Aldous Huxley and Philip K. Dick. The third and final part of the plan was a coffee table book of images related to the novel and the album by Manson and longtime art collaborator P.R. Brown.

=== Cover art and Chapter 10 ===
During the promotion of the album Holy Wood (In the Shadow of the Valley of Death) in mid 2000, several secret sister websites were launched containing audio from the album with accompanying images. TheLoveSong.com was one of the first sites to be found and contained a clip of the song "The Love Song" with an image of what looked like the cover of the book. On February 14, 2001, Manson posted a message on his official Bulletin Board System called "They'd Remember 'This As Valentine's Day'". It contained a link which led to an image of Time magazine dated February 14, 1964; it featured a picture of Marina Oswald on the cover. In the image, a hyperlink on her brooch led to Chapter 10 of the book. This was the only extract of the book released.

Although praised by critics, when the Holy Wood album was finally released it was met with disappointing sales in comparison to Manson's previous albums, taking almost a year to reach gold certification in the US. Talk of the aforementioned film and novel slowly died down in the press.

=== After Holy Wood ===
In spring 2002 Manson began again to mention the novel in various online journal posts; a release date had been set and that the delay was allegedly due to a certain religion's "way". Many assumed this to be about Christianity but in an interview with Official U.S. PlayStation Magazine to promote his appearance as Edgar in Area 51, and other later statements, it became clear the objection most likely originated from the Church of Scientology as Manson, who previously attended meetings but was unimpressed, had drawn upon the story of Jack Parsons and the novel Sex and Rockets for the book.

Manson commented on the novel in November 2005 saying that he would like to release it as either a graphic novel or narrative video game. Chuck Palahniuk has partially read the novel and describes it as "a magical, surreal, poetic story, crammed with detail and cut loose from traditional boring fiction." Magician and friend of Manson, Rudy Coby, revealed in an interview in October 2010 he has made it "one of [his] missions in life to make sure that Holy Wood is released".

I will not rest until that is turned into a graphic novel, and then turned into a movie ... I will not rest. ... But Manson certainly knows that I do not shut up about it. ... I would like to see a chapter released every other month by an incredible artist/illustrator/whatever.

On August 22, 2014, Kurt Sutter held a live chat that featured Manson via Skype. When a viewer asked if the Holy Wood novel will ever be released, Manson said that he would like to do a video mini-series following the story of the book. A release date has not been set.
