= The Fight Song (Marilyn Manson song) =

2001 single by Marilyn Manson

Single by Marilyn Manson

from the album Holy Wood (In the Shadow of the Valley of Death)
- Released: February 2, 2001
- Recorded: 2000
- Genre: Hard rock; industrial metal
- Length: 2:53
- Label: Interscope
- Songwriters: John Lowery; Marilyn Manson
- Producers: Dave Sardy; Marilyn Manson

Marilyn Manson singles chronology
"Disposable Teens" (2000)	"The Fight Song" (2001)	"The Nobodies" (2001)

"The Fight Song" is a song by American rock band Marilyn Manson. It was released in 2001 as the second single from their fourth full-length studio album, Holy Wood (In the Shadow of the Valley of Death).

It was released in two standalone physical formats. The first, titled "The Fight Song Pt.1", was released on January 29, 2001, in the US and on February 19, 2001, in the UK. "The Fight Song Pt.1" was also released as a 12" picture disc vinyl LP on February 19, 2001 in the UK. Both feature a remix by Joey Jordison of the nu metal band Slipknot. The second, titled "The Fight Song Pt.2", was released on February 2, 2001, in the US and on March 6, 2001, in the UK.

The title is a pun on high school and college football team anthems known as fight songs as the song is partly a post-Columbine statement disparaging mainstream America's own glorification of violence among its youth; football is simultaneously one of the most violent sports and one of America's greatest obsessions.

== Composition ==
"The Fight Song"
A 17-second sample of "The Fight Song", a glam rock and hard rock song.

"The Fight Song" is a hard rock and industrial metal song with glam rock influences. It was written by the band's eponymous vocalist and John 5 and produced by Manson and Dave Sardy. In "The Fight Song", Manson sings "I'm not a slave to a god that doesn't exist"; Steven Wells of NME said that in the song, Manson avoided the clichés used by other antitheist artists. Both Wells of NME and Joseph Schafer of Stereogum found the track's instrumentation similar to the guitar riff from Blur's "Song 2" (1997). Wells also felt that "The Fight Song" resembles the music of The Sweet, particularly "Little Willy" (1972).

== Critical reception ==
Schafer of Stereogum ranked it tenth on his list of "The 10 Best Marilyn Manson Songs", commenting: "In retrospect [Holy Wood] comes off as Manson's attempt at a Back in Black, a must-have disc of all singles, but unfortunately most of its tunes are too similar to one another (and too underwhelming compared to their predecessors). 'The Fight Song' is the shiniest apple from that tree, due in large part to the Blur-esque verse riff, which gives things an open, jangly feel unique in his discography, one that serves as a potent counterpoint to the Mack Truck chorus." NME's Wells wrote that the song "is glam pop so cheesy that it makes Daphne & Celeste sound like Radiohead. And how cool is that? Fucking cool, actually....OK, gloves off, stomach in, dick out this freaking RAWKS!". Rolling Stone critic Barry Walters described the track as "a three-minute encapsulation of Manson that spins on a tweaked guitar motif before giving way to crunching punk assault," while noting the "exhilarating swagger that's the essence of rock & roll".

Though she disliked Holy Wood as a whole, Liisa Ladouceur of Exclaim! said that two of its songs, "The Love Song" and "The Fight Song", are among the band's best and serve as "potent anti-authority anthems". Alec Chillingworth of Metal Hammer described "The Fight Song" as one of the band's "certified classics, branded onto industrial metal's beating heart by one Mr Brian Warner".

== Music video ==
The music video for this song, directed by W.I.Z. at Verdugo Hills High School football field, depicts the band members performing the song at a violent game of high school football between two fictional teams, "Holy Wood" (composed of jocks in white football attire) and "Death Valley" (composed of goths and social outcasts in black football attire). The video also features a few subliminal messages; at approximately 2:12, the video briefly replaces the scuffling football players with people fighting with police riot squads, and a Death Valley cheerleader is briefly seen throughout the video repeatedly hacking at a wooden pillar with an axe. Near the end of the video, it begins to rain, and a Death Valley player throws the football at the scoreboard, making it and the goalpost burst into flames. The video ends with the flaming goalpost collapsing forward.

=== Controversy ===
The music video generated minor controversy for its violent depiction of an American football game between jocks and goths, which some sources have interpreted to be directly "echoing" Columbine. Manson has vehemently denied this. He further dismissed the claims to MTV News at the American Music Awards on January 8, 2001, stating, "People will put into it what they want if it helps them sell newspapers or helps them write a headline. They're gonna want to turn it into something it isn't. Flak is my job."

== Dedication ==
At his show in Glasgow in August 2001, Manson dedicated the song to Nicola Ann Raphael, who had committed suicide two months before at 15 years old because of bullying over her Goth lifestyle.

== Formats and track listings ==
"The Fight Song" written by Marilyn Manson and John 5; "The Love Song", "Disposable Teens" and "Astonishing Panorama of the Endtimes" by Manson, 5 and Twiggy Ramirez; "Diamonds & Pollen" by Manson, Ramirez and Madonna Wayne Gacy; "Working Class Hero" by John Lennon; "Five to One" by the Doors.

- US and UK Promo CD (US/Nothing Records: INTR10292–2 · UK/Polydor: FIGHT1)
1. "The Fight Song" (Radio Edit) – 2:50
- UK Maxi Promo CD (Polydor: FIGHT2)
1. "The Fight Song" (Slipknot Remix) – 3:52
2. "The Love Song" (Bon Harris and Madonna Wayne Gacy Remix) – 3:38
3. "Disposable Teens" (Bon Harris Remix) – 11:03
4. "The Fight Song" (Clean Version) – 2:59
- European CD single (Nothing/Interscope: 497 487–2)
1. "The Fight Song" (Album Version) – 2:57
2. "The Fight Song" (Slipknot Remix) – 3:52
- European and Mexican CD Maxi single (Nothing/Interscope: 497 486–2)
1. "The Fight Song" (Album Version) – 2:57
2. "The Fight Song" (Slipknot Remix) – 3:52
3. "The Fight Song" (Live) – 4:46
- Enhanced European and Mexican CD single (Nothing/Interscope 497 485–2)
1. "The Fight Song" (Album Version) – 2:57
2. "The Love Song" (Bon Harris and Madonna Wayne Gacy Remix) – 3:38
3. "The Fight Song" (Slipknot Remix) – 3:52
4. "Disposable Teens" (Enhanced Music Video) (Note: Enhanced portion of every CD single also included a bonus picture gallery, biography, lyrics to the song, a complete list of concert dates for the Guns, God and Government Tour, as well as downloadable wallpaper art.)
- Ukrainian cassette single (Moon Records Ukraine: 497 486–4)
1. "The Fight Song" (Album Version) – 2:59
2. "Disposable Teens" (Bon Harris Remix) – 11:03
3. "The Fight Song" (Live) – 4:46
- UK CD1 (Note: This CD single contained stylized versions of four Major Arcana Tarot cards: the Fool (0), the Emperor (4), Death (13) and the Devil (15).) (Nothing/Interscope: 497 490–2)
1. "The Fight Song" (Album Version) – 2:57
2. "The Fight Song" (Slipknot Remix) – 3:52
3. "Disposable Teens" (Enhanced Music Video)
- UK CD2 (Note: This CD single contained stylized versions of four Major Arcana Tarot cards: the Magician (1), the High Priestess (2), the Hermit (9) and Justice (11).) (Nothing/Interscope: 497 491–2)
1. "The Fight Song" (Album Version) – 2:57
2. "Disposable Teens" (Bon Harris Remix) – 11:03
3. "The Love Song" (Bon Harris and Madonna Wayne Gacy Remix) – 3:38
- UK 12" picture disc (Polydor 497 491–1)
1. "The Fight Song" (Album Version) – 2:57
2. "The Fight Song" (Slipknot Remix) – 3:52
3. "The Love Song" (Bon Harris and Madonna Wayne Gacy Remix) – 3:38
- Korean CD single (Nothing/Interscope: 497 486–2)
1. "The Fight Song" (Album Version) – 2:57
2. "The Fight Song" (Slipknot Remix) – 3:52
3. "The Fight Song" (Live) – 4:46
4. "Disposable Teens" (Enhanced Music Video)
- Japanese EP (Note: Original pressings of the Japanese EP contained all eight previously-released Major Arcana Tarot cards, as well as two exclusive cards: The Hierophant (5) and the Hanged Man (12).) (Nothing/Interscope UICS–1020)
1. "The Fight Song" (Live) – 4:46
2. "The Love Song" (Bon Harris and Madonna Wayne Gacy Remix) – 3:38
3. "Disposable Teens" (Bon Harris Remix) – 11:03
4. "The Fight Song" (Slipknot Remix) – 3:51
5. "Diamonds & Pollen" – 3:55
6. "Working Class Hero" – 3:40
7. "Five to One" – 4:21
8. "Astonishing Panorama of the Endtimes" – 4:00

== Credits and personnel ==
Credits adapted from the liner notes of the vinyl edition of Holy Wood (In the Shadow of the Valley of Death).

Musicians

- Marilyn Manson – vocals
- John 5 – guitars
- Twiggy Ramirez – bass, additional guitars
- Madonna Wayne Gacy – keyboards, loops
- Ginger Fish – drums

Production

- Marilyn Manson – production
- P.R. Brown – art direction, design and photography
- Greg Fidelman – engineering, Pro Tools
- Stephen Marcussen – mastering (at Marcussen Mastering, Hollywood)
- Nick Raskulinecz – assistant engineering
- Dave Sardy – production, mixing

== Charts ==
Chart (2001)	Peak position
Austria (Ö3 Austria Top 40)	59
Europe (Eurochart Hot 100)	70
Finland (Suomen virallinen lista)	19
Germany (GfK)	67
Ireland (IRMA)	47
Italy (FIMI)	33
Scotland (The Official Charts Company)	21
Spain (AFYVE)	11
UK Singles (Official Charts)	24

== Appearances in popular media ==
- The music video for the song is shown briefly to introduce Marilyn Manson in the film Bowling for Columbine. The full video is included in the DVD special features.
- The Slipknot remix appears on the Resident Evil soundtrack.
- The song appears in the 2001 film Mean Machine for a short sequence when Jason Statham takes out several guards and a fellow inmate during the football match, although this sequence is shown in black and white and does not actually happen.
- The song was used for the WWF Invasion event in 2001, being the theme song of the event.
- Deadlock (band) covered this song on their 2016 album Hybris.
- Deaf Havana covered this song in 2019 and released it as a single
- The song was featured in the TV show Preacher.
