= Minipiano =

Make of very small upright piano

The minipiano is a very small upright piano patented by the Brasted brothers in 1934 under the name of their company Eavestaff Ltd. There are factors that make the design of the minipiano different to other forms of piano, including the tuning pins which extend from the front to the back of the instrument.

== History ==
The first minipiano brought onto the market in 1934 was known as the ‘Pianette’ model and had an Art Deco appearance which was at the time popular in many different fields of art and design. In the fifties another model was sold, and was known as the ‘Royal’ model.

The minipiano contrasted with existing forms of piano produced in London at the time. Relatively small and inexpensive, it enjoyed enormous popularity from the mid-thirties until the fifties. As a result, other manufacturers brought similar forms of diminutive piano onto the market to compete with Brasted's design.

The minipiano ‘Pianette’ model viewed with its original matching stool; the wooden flap at the front of the instrument has been dropped revealing the unique tuning pins at the front of the instrument, although the cover is closed hiding the keys.

In spite of the name, a minipiano is not a toy piano but is instead a patented alternative designed to compete with larger and heavier instruments. The ‘Pianette’ model was the first of its kind.

The development of the pianoforte included many experiments in the size and layout of the instrument. As Hammered Dulcimers developed into Clavichords which in turn influenced the development of the Harpsichord, many sub-families developed as instrument-makers experimented with new techniques and ideas. The minipiano was one of these.

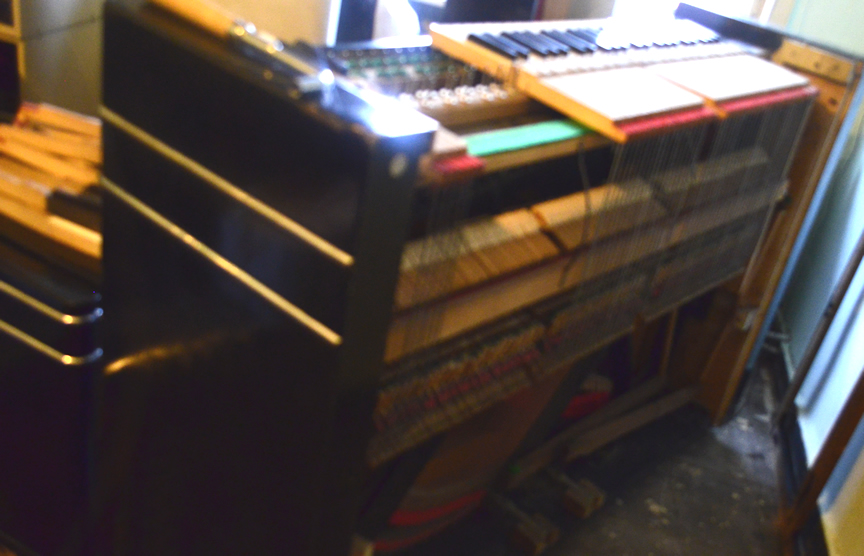
The minipiano’s lid has been completely detached to allow access to the back of the instrument; to do this two screws are removed while the piano lid is open and then after detaching the braceless back by removing a set of screws, two levers release the entire wooden structure, essential for the arduous task of getting at the piano wires.

Comparisons have been made between the minipiano and Pape’s ‘Console Piano’ which had been invented more than a hundred years earlier in 1828. It apparently shared some characteristics and mechanics which were included in the minipiano but not in other pianos. The Eavestaff piano company patented the ‘minipiano’ in the two major forms most widely known today: the ‘Pianette’ and the ‘Royal’.

=== Eavestaff Ltd. and the Brasted brothers ===
Eavestaff Ltd. was instituted in 1823; at first the company printed sheet music, but began producing musical instruments after it was taken over in 1925 by the Brasted brothers. Although the Harry and Percy Brasted made pianos before they purchased Eavestaff), they weren't well-known. Purchasing the Eavestaff company name gave prestige to their newly designed instruments, including the Eavestaff grand. The minipiano, patented by Percy Brasted in 1934, did little to enhance the company's reputation. The two major models they produced were the ‘Pianette’ and the ‘Royal’.

The ‘Pianette’ was the first minipiano brought onto the market and was popular, fashionable and technically innovative, at a time when people were impressed with technological innovations such as the gramophone. At its year of release up to 7,000 ‘Pianettes’ were sold at prices ranging between 28 and 38 guineas each at major music shops on the High Streets in London. Its construction differs considerably from a standard piano, and had some technical weaknesses. The tuning pins often loosened with time and improper storage, and these parts, as well as the rods leading to the striking pads behind the instrument are difficult to repair or replace. The 'Royal' model resembles and sounds more like an upright piano was brought onto the market in 1958.

=== The minipiano and the Art Deco era ===
The minipiano formed part of a ‘fashion’ that was dictated by the Art Deco period, and enjoyed a short period of popularity before dropping into obscurity.

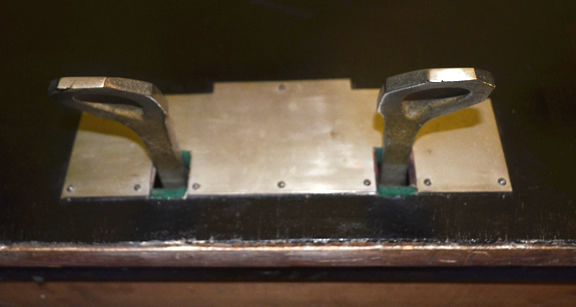
The angular frame surrounding the piano pedals of the 'Pianette' model minipiano is clearly influenced by currents of design popular particularly during the later years of what is now called the Art Deco era.

Its economical design, sleek finish and sturdy structure, made it an appropriate addition to the Art Deco oeuvre.

=== The ‘Royal’ minipiano ===
In 1958 the Brasted brothers brought out another minipiano they called the ‘Royal’ model. The ‘Royal’ minipiano is generally considered a better instrument, although both models are generally ignored in comprehensive music instrument guides (see for example Midgley, R. 1976, in which both the ‘Pianette’ and the ‘Royale’ are completely ignored).

=== Other appearances of the minipiano ===
The last public demonstration of a new minipiano to date was at a Frankfurt music fair in 1967. Also produced by Eavestaff, this instrument, known as the ‘minitronic’, resembled more an electric organ, making use of tremolo and electronic amplification. Most reactions to the unusual sounds it produced were rather negative and whether or not it was actually released onto the market is unknown.

== Design and patent ==
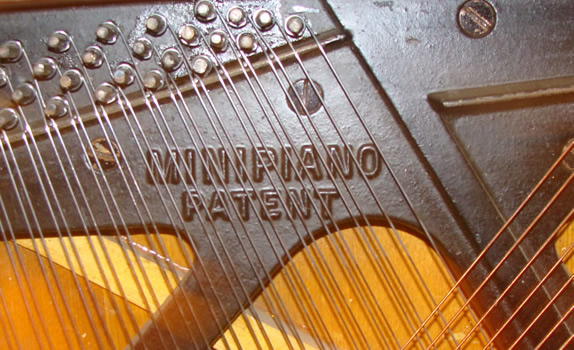
Only after removing the braceless back of the minipiano and the set of metal rods are these words clearly viewable behind the piano wires.

In addition to ambiguities about what one can define as a minipiano, there also exist discrepancies among various sources as to who first obtained the patent for the minipiano and whether or not they had the right to do so as it was not, in fact, invented by the Brasted brothers who had by then taken over the Eavestaff piano company. Apart from patenting the design in 1934, Robert Percy Brasted came up with the name 'Minipiano', and therefore there are those that claim that he either invented the piano or stole the invention from someone else and put his name to it. Neither of these facts is true and the whole affair occurred quite amicably. In fact, the Swedish designer Lundholm of Stockholm sold the rights and the minipiano in the form it was patented was produced only in England. Lundholm imported them to Sweden and received royalties for every minipiano sold.

== Mechanics ==
After removing the piano lid, the braceless back, some screws and a set of 73 metal rods a mechanism pivots outwards to reveal the striking and damper pads as illustrated in this photo.

The minipiano, despite its name and the elegant appearance of the 'Pianette' model, is a sturdy and heavy instrument; it appears small only because it differs in appearance from an upright which takes up more room and is more bulky because the chamber in which the strings are held is situated in front of the player and above the keys. On the minipiano, the soundboard and the strings are neatly positioned underneath the keys at the back of the piano, protected by a simple wooden frame to which fabric is attached to prevent dust getting in. When a key is pressed, a long thin metal rod which reaches halfway down the back of the instrument is lifted. This lifting motion causes the piano wires to be struck and then stopped by damper pads when the key is released similar to an upright piano (although on a minipiano, the highest 13 notes do not have dampers).

=== Keys and soundboard ===
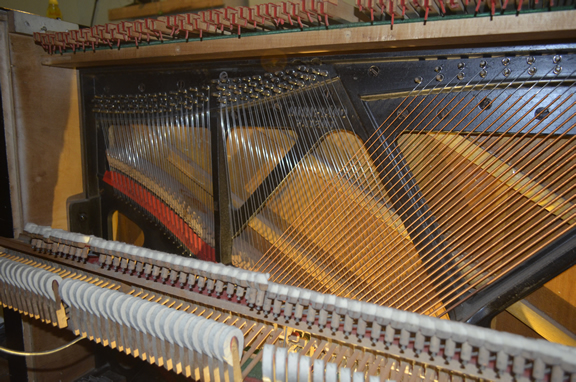
In this photo the soundboard is clearly visible. It is strung with two sets of piano wires which extend across the back of the instrument. The longer monochord bass strings pass in front of the treble strings, most of which are bichords.

There are 73 keys on a minipiano. A metal soundboard extends beneath the keyboard and is hidden behind the set of 73 metal rods which enact the piano action mechanism that produces sound on the instrument. Sound is produced by the striking and stopping of a set of piano wires which are strung to the soundboard. In a minipiano, two types of piano wire are used; bass strings which are all monochords and treble strings which are bichords. Like on an upright piano, an economical use is made of the space within the instrument by crossing different groups of strings. The first 29 keys counting from the lowest note form the first group and as mentioned they are all monochords. The second group consists of 44 keys. The first two keys counting from the lowest notes strike monochords, but the rest of the keys strike bichords. A standard piano consists largely of trichords although the lower notes use bichords and then monochords as the notes get progressively lower. Monochords extend between two pins at opposing sides, whereas bichords extend between two tuning pins one which is a little higher than the other, and the piano wire actually extends down to a nail around which it is tightly strung. The two strings are tightened so that they are tuned at exactly the same pitch. A piano makes use of trichords where three alike tuned strings are struck to produce its well-known rich tones.

=== Accessing the tuning pins ===
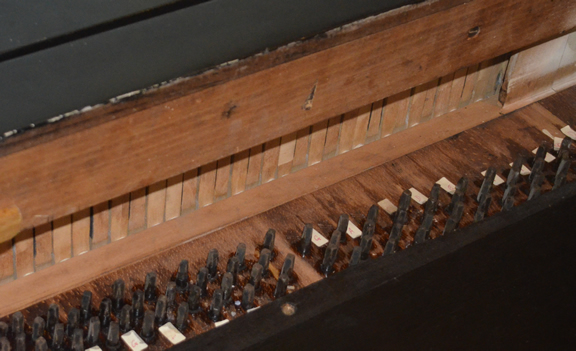
Viewed from beneath the front of the instrument, a wooden flap drops to reveal the tuning pins.

What made most models of the 'Pianette' so innovative was the positioning of the tuning pins. On any other type of piano, tuning pins are pounded into holes which are sufficiently, deliberately and exactly smaller than the pins so that a long-lasting tightness will keep them from sliding, no matter what force is put upon them while stretching the wires into tune. These holes are positioned beneath a metal soundboard and have a specified depth. On many models of the 'Pianette' minipiano, however, these tuning pins have to be longer so that they can emerge at the front of the instrument just below the keyboard. By allowing a wooden flap to fall positioned neatly beneath the keyboard, tuning pins are revealed at the front. These pins can be adjusted with a standard star-shaped piano wrench. The monochords used on the lowest 31 strings are relatively easy to tune. The bichords are somewhat more difficult but if the pins are still tight enough, they can be adjusted with slight movements of the wrench until the desired tone is reached. Unfortunately, however, this system which involved the use of specially made tuning pins specific to the minipiano, has proven to be its greatest problem to people attempting to salvage the instruments today. Although all pianos suffer to some degree from a natural loosening of these pins over time the minipiano is most highly criticized for the tendency of all the pins, especially those belonging to bichords, to loosen and slide much more quickly especially if they are not kept in a warm stable environment.

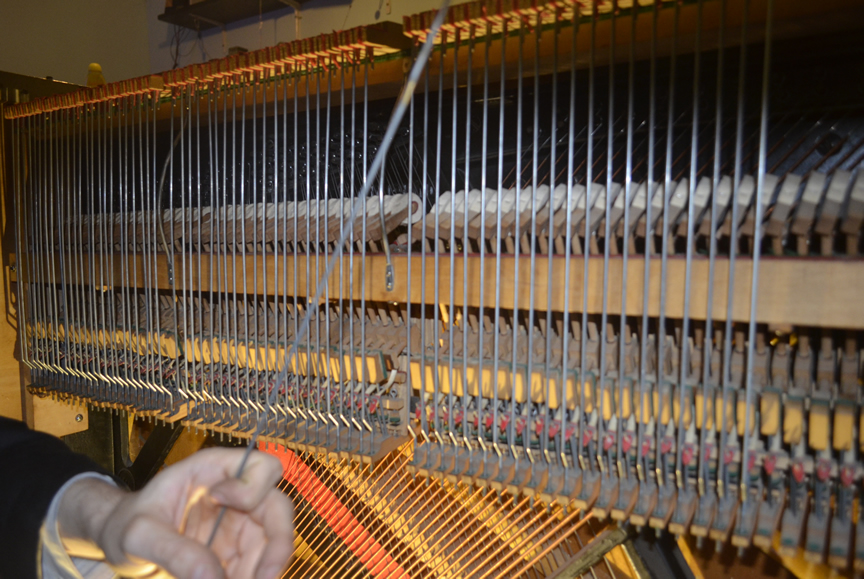
After detaching the piano lid completely and removing the back of the 'Pianette' model minipiano, a large set of metal rods is revealed preventing access to the piano wires.

Although it is possible to access the tuning pins from the back as well, it is infinitely preferable to be able to tune the minipiano from the front because in order to open the back one has to entirely detach the wooden lid, remove a whole set of metal rods, some screws above and across the wooden contraption holding the striking pad mechanism as well as two wooden rods attached to the pedals controlled by the player's feet. This is done to allow the central striking mechanism to pivot outwards on an axis pivoting on two large screws at the bottom of the wooden contraption. But before the wooden structure can pivot on the screws attaching it firmly to the instrument, two curved metallic 'handles' that connect two wooden bars passing horizontally just behind the row of metal rods have to be detached as well by the removing the screws holding them to the higher of the two bars. After this, the whole structure should gracefully pivot outwards, allowing access to both the piano wires and the tuning pins.

=== Comparison with upright piano ===
A minipiano differs from an upright piano in many ways. The primary factor that sets it apart from types of piano still manufactured today is the fact that the soundboard, the piano wires and the piano action mechanism which produces sound by striking the wires, are extended beneath the instrument rather than above it (as in an upright piano) or behind it (as in a grand piano). It is also well known for its 'braceless' removable back. Braces are wooden pieces designed to support the structure of the instrument, but are entirely unnecessary when the back consists of a single removable wooden frame with a central support beam. Fabric is firmly stapled to the inside of this removable back to prevent dust getting through. What makes the minipiano exceptional is the way the tuning pins extend from behind the metal soundboard at the back into which the tuning pins are inserted through to the front, allowing the instrument to be tuned without actually having to remove the braceless back. Unfortunately these pins are no longer made making them difficult to replace.

Although most pianos have three strings per note, the minipiano ‘Pianette’ model consists of monochords for the lowest 31 keys and bichords for the remaining 42 keys. A bichord is a single piano wire which is tightly wrapped around two metal pins but which is divided into two by a single nail. One of the pins is positioned slightly higher than the other, but the two pins are tuned separately to produce the same tone. The fact that these pins can be tuned at the front of instrument with a piano wrench make many forms of the minipiano unique. With only monochords and bichords, the 'Pianette' model could never have been expected to produce the richness of sound of a standard upright or grand piano. Still, the 'Pianette', after its release in 1934, was enormously popular; apparently people lined up outside of stores to view the sleek new models in London High Street stores, and a large number of the instruments were sold all around the world.

In addition the minipiano has fewer keys; pianos made today extend down 8 semitones lower than the minipiano, and 7 semitones higher. As a result a lot of modern piano music is simply unplayable on minipianos.

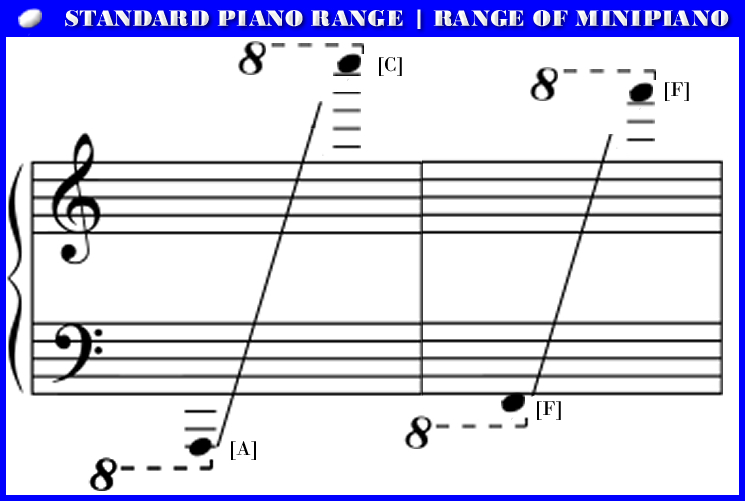
The minipiano’s range is clearly limited if compared to a standard piano.

A minipiano has striking contrasts in both design and action to an upright or a grand piano. Unfortunately the metal rods and pins which make up the complex piano action mechanism haven't been made for decades. An instrument that has a smaller tessitura, produces a less impressive sound and that is difficult to tune or repair thanks to irreplaceable parts, is bound to be compared less positively to the forms of piano which are still popular today.
