= Disposable Teens =

2000 single by Marilyn Manson

Single by Marilyn Manson

from the album Holy Wood (In the Shadow of the Valley of Death)
- B-side: "Working Class Hero"
- Released: November 7, 2000
- Recorded: 2000
- Genre: Industrial metal; gothic metal; glam rock
- Length: 3:01
- Label: Nothing; Interscope
- Songwriters: Marilyn Manson; Twiggy Ramirez; John Lowery
- Producers: Dave Sardy; Marilyn Manson

Marilyn Manson singles chronology
"Rock Is Dead" (1999)	"Disposable Teens" (2000)	"The Fight Song" (2001)

Audio sample
- "Disposable Teens": file; help

"Disposable Teens" is a song by American rock band Marilyn Manson. It was released on November 7, 2000 as the lead single from their fourth studio album, Holy Wood (In the Shadow of the Valley of Death) (2000).

It was released in two standalone physical formats. The first, titled "Disposable Teens Pt. 1", was released on November 6, 2000 in the UK. It features Manson's cover of John Lennon's "Working Class Hero". The second, titled "Disposable Teens Pt. 2", followed on November 14, 2000 and features a cover of The Doors' "Five to One". "Disposable Teens Pt. 2" was also released as a 12" picture disc vinyl LP.

It is considered a teenage anthem of sorts, echoing what Manson see as teenagers who act violently in retaliation against parental and social authority. The chorus borrows lyrically from the Beatles' song, "Revolution". The song also paraphrases George Orwell's book 1984, the original line being "you're only a rebel from the waist down". Here, it has been given new meaning as a pop culture reference to Elvis Presley's infamous swiveling hips, satirizing the assertion that they, and by extension rock 'n' roll, had caused the "decline of Western Civilization" and given rise to "disposable teens".

The song is featured in Book of Shadows: Blair Witch 2 during the opening credits. Professional wrestler Christopher Daniels has used the song as his theme in Ring of Honor and several independent promotions, as well as an instrumental remix for Total Nonstop Action Wrestling made by TNA's official music composer Dale Oliver. The song is also featured as downloadable content for Rock Band as part of the "Mayhem Tour Pack" and as a playable track for Guitar Hero Live.

== Background and composition ==
"Disposable Teens" is an industrial metal, gothic metal, glam rock and glam metal song, composed by John 5 and Twiggy Ramirez. The lyrics were written by the band's frontman Marilyn Manson. During pre-release interviews, Manson described it as a "signature Marilyn Manson song". Its bouncing guitar riff and staccato rhythm has roots in Gary Glitter's song "Rock and Roll, Pt. 2" and Kiss's song "I" from their Music from "The Elder" album. Its lyrical themes tackled the disenfranchisement of contemporary youth, "particularly those that have been [brought up] to feel like accidents", with the revolutionary idealism of their parent's generation. The influence of the Beatles was critical in this song. The chorus echoed the Liverpool quartet's own disillusionment with the 1960s counterculture movement in the opening lines of their White Album song "Revolution 1". Here, the sentiment was re-appropriated as a rallying cry for "disposable teens" against the shortcomings of "this so-called generation of revolutionaries", whom the song indicted: "You said you wanted evolution, the ape was a great big hit. You say you want a revolution, man, and I say that you're full of shit."

== Music video ==
The music video was directed by Samuel Bayer and premiered on MTV's Total Request Live on October 25, 2000. Manson asked Los Angeles radio station KROQ-FM to help spread the word that the band was looking for 200 to 250 fans to dress in black and participate in the shoot. The clip was filmed in Los Angeles.

The video starts out with Manson rising slowly from what appears to be a lake. The video cuts between Manson in several different environments and outfits including a Pope outfit which the Vatican reluctantly approved with a 1.4 million dollar price, as the food in a Last Supper reenactment and Manson himself performing to a crowd surrounded by fascist-looking police with crucifix-shaped batons. As the video climaxes, the crowd is seen overthrowing the guards.

Two versions of the video were released: one with the content mentioned above and another composed of the stage performance footage from the original.

== Cover songs ==
As early as the band's August 30, 2000 appearance at the Kerrang! Awards, Marilyn Manson expressed interest in covering Lennon's "Working Class Hero" due to its correlation with Holy Wood (In the Shadow of the Valley of Death)'s thematic preoccupations. The cover was recorded in the interim leading up to the November 7, 2000 launch of the single. In describing Lennon's idealism and influence on him, Manson said that "some of Lennon's Communist sentiments in his music later in his life were very dangerous. I think he died because of it. I don't think his death was any sort of accident. Aside from that, I think he's one of my favorite songwriters of all time." Band members Manson, Ramirez, and John 5 later performed the song as part of a special invitation-only acoustic set at the Saci nightclub in New York City to celebrate the album's November 14, 2000 release.

== Track listing ==
Disposable Teens, Pt. 1
No.	Title	Music	Length
1.	"Disposable Teens"	5, Manson, Ramirez	3:04
2.	"Working Class Hero"	John Lennon	3:42
3.	"Diamonds & Pollen"	Gacy, Manson, Ramirez	3:55

Disposable Teens, Pt. 2
No.	Title	Music	Length
1.	"Disposable Teens"	5, Manson, Ramirez	3:04
5.	"Five to One"	Densmore, Krieger, Manzarek, Morrison	4:22
6.	"Astonishing Panorama of the Endtimes"	5	3:59

== Charts ==
=== Weekly charts ===
Chart (2000)	Peak position
Australia (ARIA)	46
Europe (Eurochart Hot 100)	39
France (SNEP)	67
Germany (GfK)	64
Italy (FIMI)	7
Netherlands (Single Top 100)	99
Portugal (AFP)	5
Scottish Singles Sales (Official Charts)	11
Spain (Promusicae)	6
Sweden (Sverigetopplistan)	52
Switzerland (Schweizer Hitparade)	73
UK Singles (Official Charts Company)	12
UK Rock & Metal (Official Charts)	1
US Mainstream Rock Tracks (Billboard)	22
US Modern Rock Tracks (Billboard)	24

== Accolades ==
In 2002, Kerrang! ranked "Disposable Teens" 73rd on their "100 Greatest Singles of All Time" list.
