= The Nobodies (song) =

2001 song by Marilyn Manson

Single by Marilyn Manson

from the album Holy Wood (In the Shadow of the Valley of Death)
- Released: October 6, 2001
- Recorded: 2000
- Genre: Industrial rock
- Length: 3:40
- Label: Interscope
- Songwriters: John Lowery; Marilyn Manson
- Producers: Dave Sardy; Marilyn Manson

Marilyn Manson singles chronology
"The Fight Song" (2001)	"The Nobodies" (2001)	"Tainted Love" (2001)

Audio sample
- "The Nobodies": file; help

"The Nobodies" is a song by American rock band Marilyn Manson. It is the third and final single from their fourth studio album, Holy Wood (In the Shadow of the Valley of Death), released in 2000. The song addresses Eric Harris and Dylan Klebold, perpetrators of the Columbine High School massacre in 1999. The song's title is from a quote by John Lennon's murderer, Mark David Chapman, who once lamented that he "felt like a nobody."

As early as February 10, 2001, Manson had made indications that the song would be chosen as the album's third single. The third single was released in physical format on September 3, 2001 in the UK, and on October 6, 2001 in the US.

A remixed version of the song, called "Wormwood Remix", would later appear in the 2001 Johnny Depp film From Hell, and had an accompanying music video with footage from the film. The band has performed an acoustic version of the song, which appeared as a bonus track on the UK edition of Holy Wood.

In 2016, both the Holy Wood original and 2005 Against All Gods Mix versions of the song were used by TNA professional wrestling stable Decay (Abyss, Crazzy Steve, and Rosemary), the original version as arena entrance music and the Against All Gods Mix for taped music video vignettes.

== Music video ==
The music video for "The Nobodies" was directed by Paul Fedor. It premiered on MTV in June 2001. Technical presentation of the video uses shaking camera techniques, varying perspective shots, closeups, and fast scene shot changes.

Originally, the frontman expressed desire to film the music video in Russia "because the atmosphere, the desolation, the coldness, and the architecture would really suit the song." Another concept called for the incorporation of the MTV stunt and prank reality TV series, Jackass, due to the song's inclusion in the Jackass soundtrack. However, this idea was abandoned after the show began drawing the ire of U.S. Senator Joseph Lieberman (D-Conn.), who was among the politicians who targeted Marilyn Manson for blame after the Columbine High School massacre. Marilyn Manson explained the idea for the music video:

I already had a story for the video that I wanted to do, a sort of Marilyn Manson fairy tale about some children escaping from an orphanage and seeking refuge with me after fleeing from some terrible, evil nuns who abused them—as all nuns do, I guess. So I decided that they would be watching Jackass on television and the nuns would be upset with them, which is why they'd leave. But now I don't know what they'll be watching ... Maybe Joseph Lieberman—That might be the most appropriate thing.

— Marilyn Manson, Marilyn Manson: Moral Minority

== Columbine connection ==
The lyrics refer to Eric Harris and Dylan Klebold, the shooters of the April 20, 1999 Columbine High School massacre. Manson references the media coverage in the aftermath of the killings, singing "Some children died the other day / We fed machines and then we prayed / Puked up and down in morbid faith / You should have seen the ratings that day."

After the shootings, the media widely reported that listening to Manson's music drove Harris and Klebold to kill, though in fact they didn't appear to be fans of the band. An interview with him about the Columbine shootings was featured in the 2002 Michael Moore documentary Bowling for Columbine. When Moore asked what he would say to the kids and community of Columbine, Manson replied, "I wouldn't say anything to them. I would listen to what they have to say and that's what no one did." Also in the film, an acoustic instrumental version of the song is played during a montage of security camera footage and emergency phone calls.

== Track listing ==
No.	Title	Writer(s)	Length
1.	"The Nobodies" (album version)	Marilyn Manson; John 5	3:36
2.	"The Nobodies" (live at Mile High Stadium)	Manson; 5	3:57
3.	"The Death Song" (with Bible Speech, Live in Colorado)	Manson; 5	6:18
4.	"The Nobodies" (video)		3:40

== Chart positions ==
Chart (2001)	Peak position
Austrian Singles Chart	56
French Singles Chart	94
German Singles Chart	65
Italian Singles Charts	17
Spanish Singles Chart	8
Swiss Singles Chart	96
UK Singles Chart	34
UK Rock & Metal (OCC)	3

== Release dates ==
- Ireland – August 27, 2001
- UK – September 2001
- Germany – September 24, 2001

== Against All Gods Mix ==
The Nobodies: 2005 Against All Gods Mix (Korea Tour Limited Edition)

EP by Marilyn Manson
- Released: May 9, 2005
- Labels: Interscope; Nothing
- Producer: Marilyn Manson

Marilyn Manson chronology
Lest We Forget: The Best Of (2004)	The Nobodies: 2005 Against All Gods Mix (Korea Tour Limited Edition) (2005)	Eat Me, Drink Me (2007)

"The Nobodies: 2005 Against All Gods Mix"

Single by Marilyn Manson

from the album Lest We Forget: The Best Of
- Released: May 9, 2005
- Length: 3:37
- Label: Interscope; Nothing
- Songwriters: John Lowery; Marilyn Manson
- Producer: Marilyn Manson

Marilyn Manson singles chronology
"Personal Jesus" (2004)	"The Nobodies: 2005 Against All Gods Mix" (2005)	"Heart-Shaped Glasses (When the Heart Guides the Hand)" (2007)

"The Nobodies: 2005 Against All Gods Mix" was released in Europe as the second single and in Asia as an EP in conjunction with Marilyn Manson's Against All Gods world tour, and to radio in the United States in conjunction with the compilation album, Lest We Forget: The Best Of; only the original album version is present on the compilation.

=== Track listing ===
German CD single and mini CD single
No.	Title	Length
1.	"The Nobodies" (2005 Against All Gods Mix)	3:37
2.	"The Nobodies" (Burn 36 Mix)	5:38

Europe enhanced CD single
No.	Title	Length
1.	"The Nobodies" (2005 Against All Gods Mix)	3:37
2.	"The Nobodies" (Burn 36 Mix)	5:38
3.	"The Nobodies" (Stephane K Rock Dub Mix)	4:45
4.	"The Nobodies" (2005 Against All Gods Mix video)

Korea tour limited edition
No.	Title	Length
1.	"The Nobodies" (2005 Against All Gods Mix)	3:37
2.	"The Nobodies" (Burn 36 Mix) (German Mix)	5:41
3.	"The Nobodies" (Stephane K Rock Dub Mix)	4:45
4.	"Personal Jesus" (Rude Photo Motor Remix)	5:55
5.	"mOBSCENE Replet" (MEA Culpa Mix by Bitteren Ende)	4:41
6.	"New *hit Invective" (= Orbiter Lictum Mix by Bitteren Bnde)	4:29
7.	"This Is the New *hit" (Sergio Galoyan Mix)	4:33
8.	"The Not So Beautiful People" (from Japan bonus disc)	6:15
9.	"The Fight Song" (Slipknot Remix) (from Japan bonus disc)	3:51
10.	"The Tourniquet Prosthetic Dance Mix"	4:10
11.	"Personal Jesus" (enhanced video)
12.	"The Nobodies" (2005 Against All Gods Mix) (enhanced video)
