= Astonishing Panorama of the Endtimes =

"Astonishing Panorama of the End times"

Promotional single by Marilyn Manson

from the album Celebrity Deathmatch
- Released: November 16, 1999
- Recorded: 1998
- Genre: Industrial Rock
- Length: 3:30 (clean edit); 3:59 (original version)
- Label: Nothing; Interscope
- Composers: Twiggy Ramirez; John 5
- Lyricist: Marilyn Manson
- Producer: Marilyn Manson

Audio sample
- file; help

"Astonishing Panorama of the End Times" is a song by American rock band Marilyn Manson. It was the only single on the Celebrity Deathmatch soundtrack. A studio recording of the song was included on the band's live album The Last Tour on Earth. It was nominated for the Best Metal Performance Grammy in 2001 but lost to "Elite" by Deftones.

== Track listing ==
No.	Title	Length
1.	"Astonishing Panorama of the Endtimes" (Clean Edit)	3:30
2.	"Astonishing Panorama of the Endtimes" (Original Version)	3:59

== Song ==
Manson, who had guest starred on Celebrity Deathmatch before, was asked by MTV to write a song about the show. Manson composed a song about people's obsession with violence and how they're influenced by TV which he felt fit the show's satire about society.

Near the end of the song, the lyric "This is what you should fear, you are what you should fear" from Manson's song "Kinderfeld" off their earlier album, Antichrist Superstar is recurred. This song was recorded during the Antichrist Superstar sessions but was not released until several years later.

The song features many stylistic similarities (including vocal delivery and guitar riffs) to the classic Ministry song "Burning Inside", released 10 years earlier and also the song "Drug" by Killing Joke on the album Mortal Kombat: More Kombat.

The backward lyrics at the beginning of the song, when played forward, are a boys chorus singing "and to die with dignity, sing to the...", a sample from the film 1984.

== Music video ==
The video was directed by Pete List and it featured Marilyn Manson as a Celebrity Deathmatch character performing in the Deathmatch arena. The first part of the video was used in the episode Fandemonium II, the second season's finale, right before a fight between Manson and Ricky Martin.

== Personnel ==
- Marilyn Manson – vocals
- John 5 – guitar
- Twiggy Ramirez – bass
- Madonna Wayne Gacy – keyboards
- Ginger Fish – drums
