= Marilyn Manson discography =

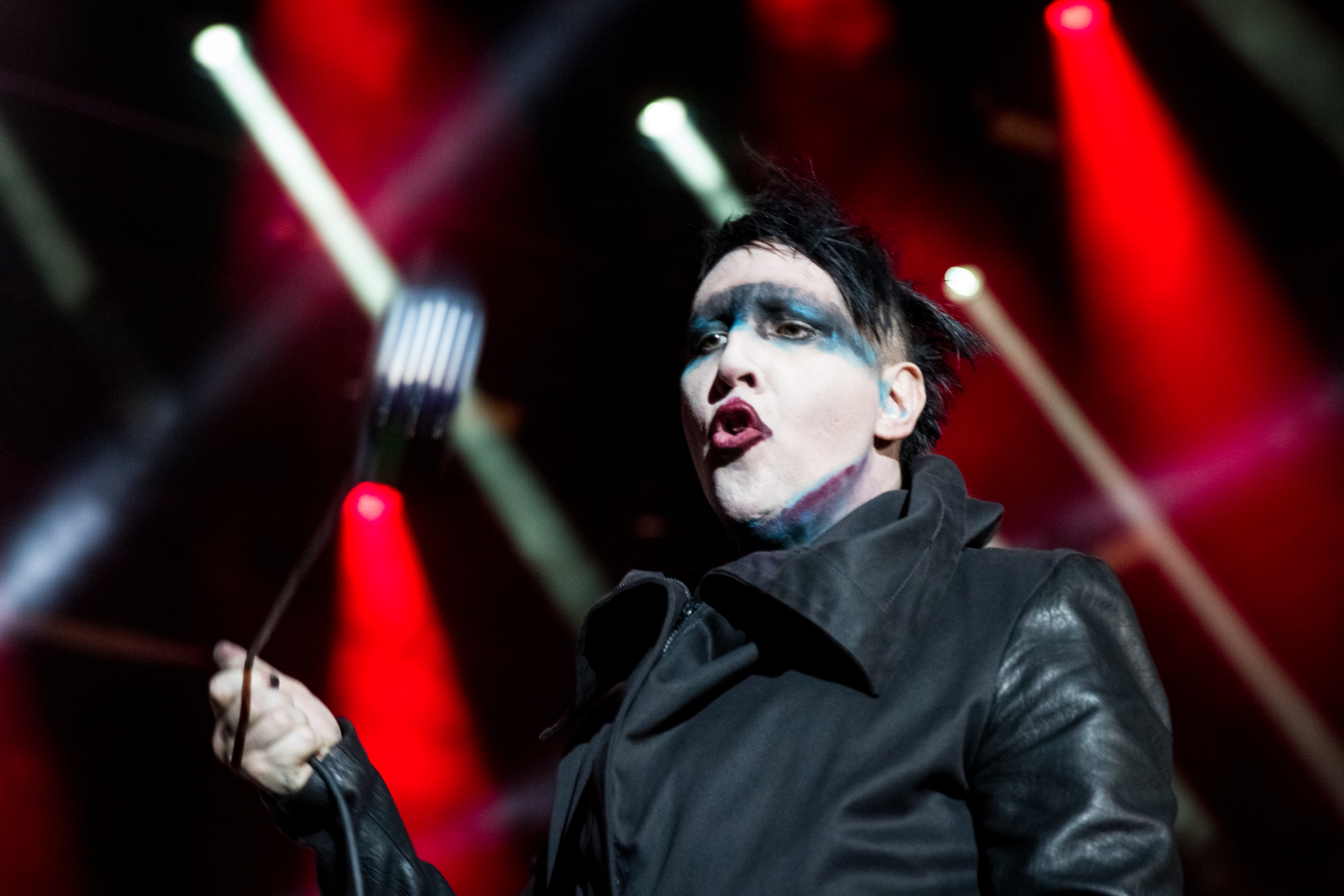
- Marilyn Manson performing at Rock am Ring 2015
- Studio albums: 13
- Extended plays: 2
- Live albums: 1
- Compilation albums: 1
- Singles: 39
- Video albums: 6
- Music videos: 48
- Independent releases: 10

American rock band Marilyn Manson has released thirteen studio albums, one live album, one compilation album, two extended plays, 39 singles, nine promotional singles, six video albums, and 48 music videos.

After forming in 1989 and signing a contract with Nothing Records and Interscope in 1993, the band released their first studio album, Portrait of an American Family (1994). Although initially not a commercial success, the album would eventually be certified gold by the RIAA for shipments in excess of 500,000 copies. Spurred by their version of the Eurythmics's "Sweet Dreams (Are Made of This)", the band's first EP, Smells Like Children (1995), became a commercial success, selling over a million copies in the US alone. In 1996, the band released their second studio album, Antichrist Superstar, which reached number three on the Billboard 200 and has sold over 1.9 million copies in the US. The album went on to sell over seven million copies worldwide, and was supported by the release of 1997's Remix & Repent EP. Their third studio album, Mechanical Animals (1998), was a commercial and critical success, reaching number one on the Billboard 200, and topping the charts in Australia and Canada. Mechanical Animals was later followed by their first live album, The Last Tour on Earth (1999), which included the promotional single "Astonishing Panorama of the Endtimes".

In 2000, the band released Holy Wood (In the Shadow of the Valley of Death), which also had massive worldwide success. Their fifth studio album, The Golden Age of Grotesque (2003), was a modest commercial success in their native US, debuting at number one with sales of 118,000 copies. As of November 2008, the album has sold 526,000 copies in the US. In contrast, the album was, by far, Manson's most successful internationally, peaking within the top five in most of the major European markets. Their sixth album, Eat Me, Drink Me, was released in 2007 and debuted at number eight on the Billboard 200. The High End of Low (2009), reached number four on both the US and Canadian album charts, but was their last album released by Interscope. After signing a deal with Cooking Vinyl, the band released Born Villain in 2012. Their ninth studio album, The Pale Emperor, was released on January 15, 2015, debuting at number eight in the US with their highest first-week sales since Eat Me, Drink Me in 2007. Heaven Upside Down was released on October 6, 2017. They released their eleventh album, We Are Chaos, on September 11, 2020. The band's twelfth studio album, One Assassination Under God – Chapter 1, was released on November 22, 2024; its sequel, One Assassination Under God – Chapter 2, was released August 14, 2026.

== Albums ==
=== Studio albums ===
Title	Details	Peak chart positions										Sales	Certifications
Title	Details	US	AUS	AUT	CAN	FIN	FRA	GER	NZ	SWI	UK	Sales	Certifications
Portrait of an American Family	Released: July 19, 1994; Label: Nothing, Interscope; Formats: CD, cassette	— (Note: Portrait of an American Family did not enter the Billboard 200 chart, but peaked at number 35 on the Top Heatseekers chart.)	—	—	—	—	—	—	—	—	—	US: 645,000	RIAA: Gold; BPI: Silver
Antichrist Superstar	Released: October 8, 1996; Label: Nothing, Interscope; Formats: CD, cassette	3	41	37	2	13	116	100	5	—	73	WW: 7,000,000; US: 1,900,000	RIAA: Platinum; ARIA: Gold; BPI: Gold; MC: 2× Platinum; RIANZ: Platinum
Mechanical Animals	Released: September 15, 1998; Label: Nothing, Interscope; Formats: CD, cassette, vinyl	1	1	6	1	6	14	7	3	44	8	US: 1,409,000	RIAA: Platinum; ARIA: Gold; BPI: Gold; MC: Platinum; RIANZ: Platinum
Holy Wood (In the Shadow of the Valley of Death)	Released: November 11, 2000; Label: Nothing, Interscope; Formats: CD, cassette, vinyl	13	8	6	13	25	12	11	18	20	23	US: 573,000	RIAA: Gold; BPI: Gold; BVMI: Gold; IFPI SWI: Gold; MC: Gold
The Golden Age of Grotesque	Released: May 7, 2003; Label: Nothing, Interscope; Formats: CD, cassette, vinyl	1	5	1	1	8	2	1	16	1	4	US: 526,000	ARIA: Gold; BPI: Gold; BVMI: Gold; IFPI AUT: Gold; IFPI SWI: Gold; SNEP: Gold
Eat Me, Drink Me	Released: June 5, 2007; Label: Interscope; Formats: CD, digital download	8	9	2	8	9	5	4	18	4	8		BPI: Silver
The High End of Low	Released: May 20, 2009; Label: Interscope; Formats: CD, digital download	4	12	6	4	9	9	11	8	6	19	US: 148,000	
Born Villain	Released: April 25, 2012; Label: Hell, etc., Cooking Vinyl; Formats: CD, vinyl, digital download	10	16	4	8	18	8	5	19	2	14	US: 122,000; Europe: 100,000; FRA: 15,000	
The Pale Emperor	Released: January 15, 2015; Label: Hell, etc.; Formats: CD, vinyl, digital download	8	6	4	4	10	5	4	5	1	16	US: 136,000; FRA: 30,000	
Heaven Upside Down	Released: October 6, 2017; Label: Loma Vista, Caroline; Formats: CD, vinyl, digital download	8	4	4	4	8	15	9	6	3	7	US: 52,000	
We Are Chaos	Released: September 11, 2020; Label: Loma Vista, Concord; Formats: CD, digital download, vinyl, cassette	8	1	2	8	8	10	4	32	2	7	US: 69,000	
One Assassination Under God – Chapter 1	Released: November 22, 2024; Label: Nuclear Blast; Formats: CD, cassette, vinyl, digital download	32	44	6	—	23	25	4	35	4	36	US: 20,000	
One Assassination Under God – Chapter 2	Released: August 14, 2026; Label: Nuclear Blast; Formats: CD, cassette, vinyl, digital download	41	13	3	—	14	14	5	30	6	27	US: 18,505; JPN: 896; UK: 3,624	
"—" denotes a title that did not chart, or was not released in that territory.

=== Live albums ===
List of live albums, with selected chart positions, sales figures and certifications
Title	Details	Peak chart positions							Sales	Certifications
Title	Details	US	AUS	FRA	GER	NZ	SWE	UK	Sales	Certifications
The Last Tour on Earth	Released: November 12, 1999; Label: Nothing, Interscope; Formats: CD, cassette	82	50	62	46	38	59	61	US: 305,000	BPI: Silver

=== Compilation albums ===
List of compilation albums, with selected chart positions, sales figures and certifications
Title	Details	Peak chart positions										Sales	Certifications
Title	Details	US	AUS	AUT	CAN	FIN	FRA	GER	NZ	SWI	UK	Sales	Certifications
Lest We Forget: The Best Of	Released: September 28, 2004; Label: Interscope; Formats: CD, cassette, digital download	9	15	3	3	22	2	4	9	5	4	US: 1,000,000	RIAA: Gold; ARIA: Gold; SNEP: Gold; BPI: Platinum; BVMI: Gold

== Extended plays ==
List of extended plays, with selected chart positions, sales figures and certifications
Title	Details	Peak chart positions					Sales	Certifications
Title	Details	US	AUS	CAN	FIN	UK	Sales	Certifications
Smells Like Children	Released: October 24, 1995; Label: Nothing, Interscope; Formats: CD, cassette	31	73	42	—	—	US: 1,309,000	RIAA: Platinum; MC: Platinum; BPI: Gold
Remix & Repent	Released: November 25, 1997; Label: Nothing, Interscope; Formats: CD, cassette	102	49	69	18	163 (Note: "Remix & Repent" originally peaked at number 163 on the UK Singles Chart as an import. When it was officially released as a single, it was deemed ineligible to enter the UK Singles Chart by the Official Charts Company, as it exceeded the maximum track length for a release to be considered a single; it did, however, peak at number one on the UK Budget Albums Chart, and at number one on the UK Rock & Metal Singles Chart.)		
"—" denotes a title that did not chart, or was not released in that territory.

== Singles ==
Key
†	Indicates that a single was not commercially released in a physical format

=== 1990s ===
List of singles, with selected chart positions and certifications
Title	Year	Peak chart positions										Certifications	Album
Title	Year	US Bub.	US Main.	AUS	CAN	FIN	NLD	NZ	SWE	SPA	UK	Certifications	Album
"Get Your Gunn"	1994	—	—	97	11	—	—	—	—	—	— (Note: "Get Your Gunn" did not enter the UK Singles Chart, but peaked at number 5 on the UK Rock & Metal Singles Chart.)		Portrait of an American Family
"Lunchbox"	1995	—	—	81	5	—	—	—	—	—	— (Note: "Lunchbox" did not enter the UK Singles Chart, but peaked at number 5 on the UK Rock & Metal Singles Chart.)		Portrait of an American Family
"Sweet Dreams (Are Made of This)"	1995	—	31	28	— (Note: "Sweet Dreams (Are Made of This)" did not enter the Canadian Singles Chart, but peaked at number 12 on the Canadian Rock/Alternative Chart.)	—	—	50	—	—	135	BPI: Silver; RMNZ: Platinum	Smells Like Children
"The Beautiful People"	1996	—	29	42	61	—	96	29	—	—	18	BPI: Gold; RMNZ: 2× Platinum; IFPI SWE: Gold	Antichrist Superstar
"Long Hard Road Out of Hell"	1997	—	—	—	—	—	—	—	—	—	—		Spawn soundtrack
"Tourniquet"	1997	—	30	52	— (Note: "Tourniquet" did not enter the Canadian Singles Chart, but peaked at number 9 on the Canadian Rock/Alternative Chart.)	16	—	41	—	6	28		Antichrist Superstar
"The Dope Show"	1998	22	12	20	14	— (Note: "The Dope Show" did not enter the Finnish Singles chart, but peaked at number 32 on the Finnish Airplay chart.)	63	28	53	— (Note: "The Dope Show" was not issued as a commercial single in Spain, but the song peaked at number 36 on the Spanish Airplay Chart.)	12	IFPI SWE: Gold	Mechanical Animals
"I Don't Like the Drugs (But the Drugs Like Me)"	1999	—	25	45	59	—	83	35	—	9	—		Mechanical Animals
"Rock Is Dead"	1999	—	28	—	—	—	—	—	—	34	23		Mechanical Animals
"—" denotes singles which were not released in that country or failed to chart.

=== 2000s ===
List of singles, with selected chart positions and certifications
Title	Year	Peak chart positions										Certifications	Album
Title	Year	US Bub.	US Main.	AUS	AUT	GER	ITA	NLD	SWE	SWI	UK	Certifications	Album
"Disposable Teens"	2000	—	22	46	—	64	7	99	52	73	12		Holy Wood (In the Shadow of the Valley of Death)
"The Fight Song"	2001	—	—	—	59	67	33	—	—	—	24		Holy Wood (In the Shadow of the Valley of Death)
"The Nobodies"	2001	—	—	—	56	—	17	—	—	96	34		Holy Wood (In the Shadow of the Valley of Death)
"Tainted Love"	2001	—	30	—	2	3	2	44	11	2	5	IFPI AUT: Gold; BPI: Gold; BVMI: Gold; RMNZ: Gold	Not Another Teen Movie soundtrack
"Mobscene"	2003	—	18	31	15	20	9	84	18	6	13		The Golden Age of Grotesque
"This Is the New Shit"	2003	—	—	31	24	25	41	—	59	44	29	RMNZ: Gold	The Golden Age of Grotesque
"Personal Jesus"	2004	24	20	30	10	11	10	89	39	13	13		Lest We Forget: The Best Of
"The Nobodies 2005"	2005	—	—	—	56	65	—	—	—	42	—		Lest We Forget: The Best Of
"Heart-Shaped Glasses (When the Heart Guides the Hand)"	2007	—	31	—	41	49	29	—	18	—	19		Eat Me, Drink Me
"Putting Holes in Happiness"	2007	—	—	—	—	83	—	—	—	—	—		Eat Me, Drink Me
"We're from America"	2009	—	—	—	—	—	—	—	—	—	—		The High End of Low
"Arma-goddamn-motherfuckin-geddon"	2009	—	37	—	—	67	—	—	48	—	114		The High End of Low
"—" denotes items which were not released in that country or failed to chart.

=== 2010s and 2020s ===
List of singles, with selected chart positions
Title	Year	Peak chart positions										Certifications	Album
Title	Year	US Main.	US Rock	US Hard Rock	US Rock Digital	AUS Digital	CAN Rock	Czech Rock Songs	FRA	GER Alt.	UK Singles Sales	Certifications	Album
"No Reflection"	2012	26	50	—	—	—	—	2	—	—	— (Note: "No Reflection" did not enter the UK Singles Sales Chart, but peaked at number 12 on the UK Rock & Metal Singles Chart.)		Born Villain
"Slo-Mo-Tion"	2012	—	—	—	—	—	43	—	—	—	—		Born Villain
"Third Day of a Seven Day Binge"	2014	—	—	—	—	—	—	4	—	3	—	RMNZ: Gold	The Pale Emperor
"Deep Six"	2014	8	27	—	31	—	29	—	—	1	—		The Pale Emperor
"Cupid Carries a Gun"†	2015	—	—	—	—	—	—	—	—	—	—		The Pale Emperor
"We Know Where You Fucking Live"†	2017	—	41	—	— (Note: "We Know Where You Fucking Live" did not enter the US Rock Digital Songs Chart, but peaked at number 5 on the US Hard Rock Digital Songs Chart.)	—	—	—	—	4	—		Heaven Upside Down
"Kill4Me"†	2017	5	34	—	—	—	40	—	—	—	—		Heaven Upside Down
"Helter Skelter" (with Rob Zombie)†	2018	—	—	—	— (Note: "Helter Skelter" did not enter the US Rock Digital Songs Chart, but peaked at number 9 on the US Hard Rock Digital Songs Chart.)	—	—	—	—	—	—		Non-album singles
"Cry Little Sister"†	2018	—	15	—	5	—	—	—	—	—	88		Non-album singles
"God's Gonna Cut You Down"	2019	—	8	—	1	—	— (Note: "God's Gonna Cut You Down" did not enter the Canadian Rock Chart, but peaked at number 44 on the Canadian Hot Digital Songs Chart.)	—	154	—	— (Note: "God's Gonna Cut You Down" did not enter the UK Singles Sales Chart, but peaked at number 2 on the UK Physical Singles Chart.)		Non-album singles
"The End"†	2019	—	—	—	17	—	—	—	190	—	—		Non-album singles
"We Are Chaos"	2020	8	45	4	4	—	31	5	118	1	—		We Are Chaos
"Don't Chase the Dead"†	2020	29	49	5	13	—	—	—	—	—	—		We Are Chaos
"As Sick as the Secrets Within"†	2024	—	—	6	7	41	—	—	— (Note: "As Sick as the Secrets Within" did not enter the French Singles Chart, but peaked at number 76 on the French Airplay Chart and number 40 on the France Digital Songs Chart.)	—	42		One Assassination Under God – Chapter 1
"Raise the Red Flag"	2024	—	—	8	10	37	—	—	— (Note: "Raise the Red Flag" did not enter the French Singles Chart, but peaked at number 72 on the French Airplay Chart and number 42 on the France Digital Songs Chart.)	—	35		One Assassination Under God – Chapter 1
"Sacrilegious"†	2024	—	—	—	— (Note: "Sacrilegious" did not enter the US Rock Digital Songs Chart, but peaked at number 10 on the US Hard Rock Digital Songs Chart.)	—	—	—	—	—	—		One Assassination Under God – Chapter 1
"In the Air Tonight"	2025	—	—	10	2	24	—	—	—	—	15		Non-album singles
"God Is a Weapon" (with Falling in Reverse)	2025	9	26	2	4	—	—	—	—	—	61		Non-album singles
"Exit Wound"	2026	24	—	21	—	—	—	—	—	—	—		One Assassination Under God – Chapter 2
"Front Toward Enemy"	2026	—	—	—	—	—	—	—	—	—	—		One Assassination Under God – Chapter 2
"Unalive"	2026	—	—	—	—	—	—	—	—	—	—		One Assassination Under God – Chapter 2
"—" denotes items which were not released in that country or failed to chart.

== Promotional singles ==
List of promotional singles, showing year released, selected chart positions and album name
Title	Year	Peak chart positions		Album
Title	Year	US Main	GER Alt.	Album
"Dope Hat"	1995	—	—	Portrait of an American Family
"Antichrist Superstar"	1996	—	—	Antichrist Superstar
"Man That You Fear"	1997	—	—	Antichrist Superstar
"Coma White"	1999	—	—	Mechanical Animals
"Astonishing Panorama of the Endtimes"	1999	—	—	Celebrity Deathmatch soundtrack
"You and Me and the Devil Makes 3"	2007	—	—	Eat Me, Drink Me
"The Mephistopheles of Los Angeles"	2015	—	3	The Pale Emperor
"The Devil Beneath My Feet"	2015	—	—	The Pale Emperor
"Tattooed in Reverse"	2018	35	—	Heaven Upside Down

== Other charted songs ==
List of songs, with selected chart positions, showing year charted and album name
Title	Year	Peak chart positions						Certifications	Album
Title	Year	US Rock	US Rock Digital	US Hard Rock	US Hard Rock Digital	FRA	UK Rock	Certifications	Album
"Doll-Dagga Buzz-Buzz Ziggety-Zag"	2012	—	—	—	—	—	15		The Golden Age of Grotesque
"This Is Halloween"	2014	25	50	—	6	186	26	RIAA: Gold	Nightmare Revisited
"Killing Strangers"	2014	—	—	—	10	—	—		The Pale Emperor
"Red Black and Blue"	2020	—	—	22	—	—	—		We Are Chaos
"—" denotes items which were not released in that country or failed to chart.

== Guest appearances ==
Song	Year	Album
"Apple of Sodom"	1997	Lost Highway soundtrack
"The Suck for Your Solution"	1997	Private Parts soundtrack
"Transylvanian Concubine" (Marilyn Manson Remix)	1997	Transylvanian Regurgitations — Rasputina
"Golden Years"	1998	Dead Man on Campus soundtrack
"The Omen (Damien II)"	1998	Flesh of My Flesh, Blood of My Blood — DMX
"Highway to Hell"	1999	Detroit Rock City soundtrack
"Suicide Is Painless"	2000	Book of Shadows: Blair Witch 2 soundtrack
"The Way I Am" (Danny Lohner & Marilyn Manson Remix)	2000	The Marshall Mathers LP — Eminem
"Break You Down"	2001	2000 Years of Human Error — Godhead
"The Nobodies" (Wormwood Remix)	2001	From Hell soundtrack
"The Beautiful People" (The WWF Remix)	2002	WWF Forceable Entry
"Redeemer"	2002	Queen of the Damned soundtrack
"Buy Myself" (Marilyn Manson Remix)	2002	Reanimation — Linkin Park
"The KKK Took My Baby Away"	2003	We're a Happy Family: A Tribute to Ramones
"The La La Song"	2003	Party Monster soundtrack
"Irresponsible Hate Anthem" (Venus Head Trap Mix)	2005	Saw II soundtrack
"This Is Halloween"	2006	The Nightmare Before Christmas soundtrack
"LoveGame" (Chew Fu GhettoHouse Fix)	2009	"LoveGame"/The Remix — Lady Gaga
"Can't Haunt Me"	2013	Can't Haunt Me — Skylar Grey
"Bad Girl"	2013	Avril Lavigne — Avril Lavigne
"Pussy Wet"	2013	Diary of a Trap God — Gucci Mane
"Solid"	2013	Amicalement EP — Mr. Oizo
"Hypothetical"	2014	Silent So Long — Emigrate
"Cat People (Putting Out Fire)"	2016	Countach (For Giorgio) — Shooter Jennings
"Stigmata"	2017	Atomic Blonde soundtrack
"Marilyn Manson"	2020	Floor Seats II — ASAP Ferg
"Jail, Pt. 2"	2021	Donda — Kanye West
"Pablo"	2025	Donda 2 (2025 rerelease) — Kanye West

== Videography ==
=== Video albums ===
List of video albums with relevant details
Title	Details	Peak chart positions				Certifications
Title	Details	US	FIN	GER	NLD	Certifications
Dead to the World	Released: February 10, 1998; Label: Nothing, Interscope; Formats: VHS	1	—	—	—	CRIA: Gold
God Is in the T.V.	Released: November 2, 1999; Label: Nothing, Interscope; Formats: VHS	3	—	—	—	
Guns, God and Government	Released: October 29, 2002; Label: Eagle Rock; Formats: VHS, DVD, UMD	1	4	75	21	RIAA: Platinum; ARIA: Platinum; CRIA: Platinum; BVMI: Gold; BPI: Gold
Lest We Forget: The Best Of — The Videos	Released: October 9, 2004; Label: Universal Music & Video Distribution; Formats: DVD	1	—	—	—	
Guns, God and Government — Live in L.A.	Released: November 17, 2009; Label: Eagle Rock; Formats: BD	—	—	—	—	
Born Villain	Released: August 28, 2011; Label: Hell, etc.; Formats: DVD	—	—	—	—	
"—" denotes items which were not released in that country or failed to chart.

=== Music videos ===
List of music videos, showing year released and directors
Title	Year	Director(s)	Album
"Get Your Gunn"	1994	Rod Chong	Portrait of an American Family
"Lunchbox"	1994	Richard Kern	Portrait of an American Family
"Dope Hat"	1995	Tom Stern	Portrait of an American Family
"Sweet Dreams (Are Made of This)"	1995	Dean Karr	Smells Like Children
"The Beautiful People"	1996	Floria Sigismondi	Antichrist Superstar
"Tourniquet"	1996	Floria Sigismondi	Antichrist Superstar
"Man That You Fear"	1997	W.I.Z.	Antichrist Superstar
"Cryptorchid"	1997	E. Elias Merhige	Antichrist Superstar
"Antichrist Superstar"	1997	E. Elias Merhige	Antichrist Superstar
"Long Hard Road Out of Hell"	1997	Matthew Rolston	Spawn soundtrack
"Apple of Sodom"	1998	Joseph Cultice	Lost Highway soundtrack
"The Dope Show"	1998	Paul Hunter	Mechanical Animals
"I Don't Like the Drugs (But the Drugs Like Me)"	1998	Paul Hunter	Mechanical Animals
"Rock Is Dead"	1999	Marilyn Manson	Mechanical Animals
"Coma White"	1999	Samuel Bayer	Mechanical Animals
"Astonishing Panorama of the Endtimes"	1999	Pete List	Celebrity Deathmatch soundtrack
"Disposable Teens"	2000	Samuel Bayer	Holy Wood (In the Shadow of the Valley of Death)
"The Fight Song"	2001	W.I.Z. and Marilyn Manson	Holy Wood (In the Shadow of the Valley of Death)
"The Nobodies"	2001	Paul Fedor	Holy Wood (In the Shadow of the Valley of Death)
"Tainted Love"	2002	Philip Atwell	Not Another Teen Movie soundtrack
"Mobscene"	2003	Marilyn Manson and Thomas Kloss	The Golden Age of Grotesque
"This Is the New Shit"	2003	Marilyn Manson and The Cronenweths	The Golden Age of Grotesque
"Saint"	2004	Asia Argento	The Golden Age of Grotesque
"Personal Jesus"	2004	Marilyn Manson and Nathan Cox	Lest We Forget: The Best Of
"Heart-Shaped Glasses (When the Heart Guides the Hand)"	2007	Marilyn Manson	Eat Me, Drink Me
"Putting Holes in Happiness"	2007	Philippe Grandrieux	Eat Me, Drink Me
"Arma-goddamn-motherfuckin-geddon"	2009	Delaney Bishop	The High End of Low
"Running to the Edge of the World"	2009	Nathan Cox and Marilyn Manson	The High End of Low
"WOW"	2010	Marilyn Manson	The High End of Low
"No Reflection"	2012	Lukas Ettlin	Born Villain
"Slo-Mo-Tion"	2012	Marilyn Manson	Born Villain
"Hey, Cruel World..."	2012	Tim Mattia	Born Villain
"Deep Six"	2014	Bart Hess	The Pale Emperor
"The Mephistopheles of Los Angeles"	2015	Francesco Carrozzini	The Pale Emperor
"Third Day of a Seven Day Binge"	2015	Jeremy Danger and Travis Shinn	The Pale Emperor
"Say10" (teaser)	2016	Tyler Shields	Heaven Upside Down
"We Know Where You Fucking Live"	2017	Bill Yukich and Perou	Heaven Upside Down
"Say10"	2017	Bill Yukich	Heaven Upside Down
"Kill4Me"	2017	Bill Yukich	Heaven Upside Down
"Tattooed in Reverse"	2018	Bill Yukich	Heaven Upside Down
"Cry Little Sister"	2018	Bill Yukich	non-album single
"God's Gonna Cut You Down"	2019	Tim Mattia	non-album single
"We Are Chaos"	2020	Matt Mahurin	We Are Chaos
"Don't Chase the Dead"	2020	Travis Shinn	We Are Chaos
"As Sick As the Secrets Within" (teaser)	2024	Bill Yukich	One Assassination Under God – Chapter 1
"As Sick as the Secrets Within"	2024	Bill Yukich	One Assassination Under God – Chapter 1
"Raise the Red Flag"	2024	Bill Yukich	One Assassination Under God – Chapter 1
"Sacrilegious"	2024	Bill Yukich	One Assassination Under God – Chapter 1
"One Assassination Under God"	2024	Bill Yukich	One Assassination Under God – Chapter 1
"Exit Wound"	2026	RIZZ and Gretchen Lanham	One Assassination Under God – Chapter 2
"Front Toward Enemy"	2026	Henri Alexander Levy	One Assassination Under God – Chapter 2
"Unalive"	2026	Anthony Silva	One Assassination Under God – Chapter 2

== Other releases ==
Year	Title	Notes
1999	Marilyn Manson: The Collector's Edition	Box set containing God Is in the T.V. and The Last Tour on Earth, as well as a double-sided poster featuring the covers of both respective releases. It was released in limited numbers in December 1999 by Interscope Records.
2004	Lunch Boxes & Choklit Cows	Collection of remastered early tracks by Marilyn Manson & The Spooky Kids, released by Scott Putesky.
2007	iTunes Essentials: Marilyn Manson	Compilation of the best material of the time by Marilyn Manson, collected for digital download through the iTunes Store. Separated into two parts: "The Basics", which generally contains the band's singles, and "Next Steps", which contains for the most part other songs that are popular with the band's fanbase. The compilation was updated on April 27, 2010, to include tracks from Manson's seventh studio album, The High End of Low.
2008	Lost & Found	Compilation album that contains four songs from first four studio albums and one from their only live album, The Last Tour on Earth.
2009	The Marilyn Manson Collection	Compilation album that contains six studio albums,two EPs,one live album,and 11 bonus tracks
2013	Antichrist Final Songs	Demo cassette, released by Scott Putesky on eBay.
N/A	Lunch Boxes & Choklit Cows Vol. 2	Second collection of remastered early tracks by Marilyn Manson & The Spooky Kids. It was leaked in the Internet, as it remains unreleased.

== Independent releases ==
Year	Title	Additional information
1990	The Raw Boned Psalms	First cassette release as Marilyn Manson & the Spooky Kids. It was never sold, most likely given away to friends of the band. The tape contains the earliest recorded appearances of "My Monkey" and "Dogma" (as "Strange Same Dogma").
1990	The Beaver Meat Cleaver Beat	Second cassette release. Very few copies were ever made and only given away to friends of the band and club owners with the purpose of booking shows.
1990	Big Black Bus	Third cassette release. It was the first cassette to be sold publicly by the band.
1990	Grist-O-Line	Fourth cassette release. Earliest recorded appearance of "Cake and Sodomy".
1991	Lunchbox	Fifth cassette release. Despite it bearing the name of the song "Luchbox", the song is not included in this release. Apparently, it was the cassette with the widest distribution and with most copies made by the band at this time.
1991	After School Special	Sixth cassette release. It's the only cassette release by the band featuring real drums. It contains the earliest recorded appearances of "Lunchbox" and "Cyclops".
1992	Live as Hell	Seventh and last cassette release under the "Marilyn Manson & the Spooky Kids" name. Recorded live on "Radio Clash".
1992	The Family Jams	First cassette release as Marilyn Manson. Earliest recorded appearance of "Dope Hat".
1993	Refrigerator	Second and last cassette release as Marilyn Manson. Limited to 100 copies. Earliest recorded appearance of "Wrapped in Plastic".
1993	The Manson Family Album	Officially unreleased first version of "Portrait of an American Family".
