= List of songs recorded by Marilyn Manson =

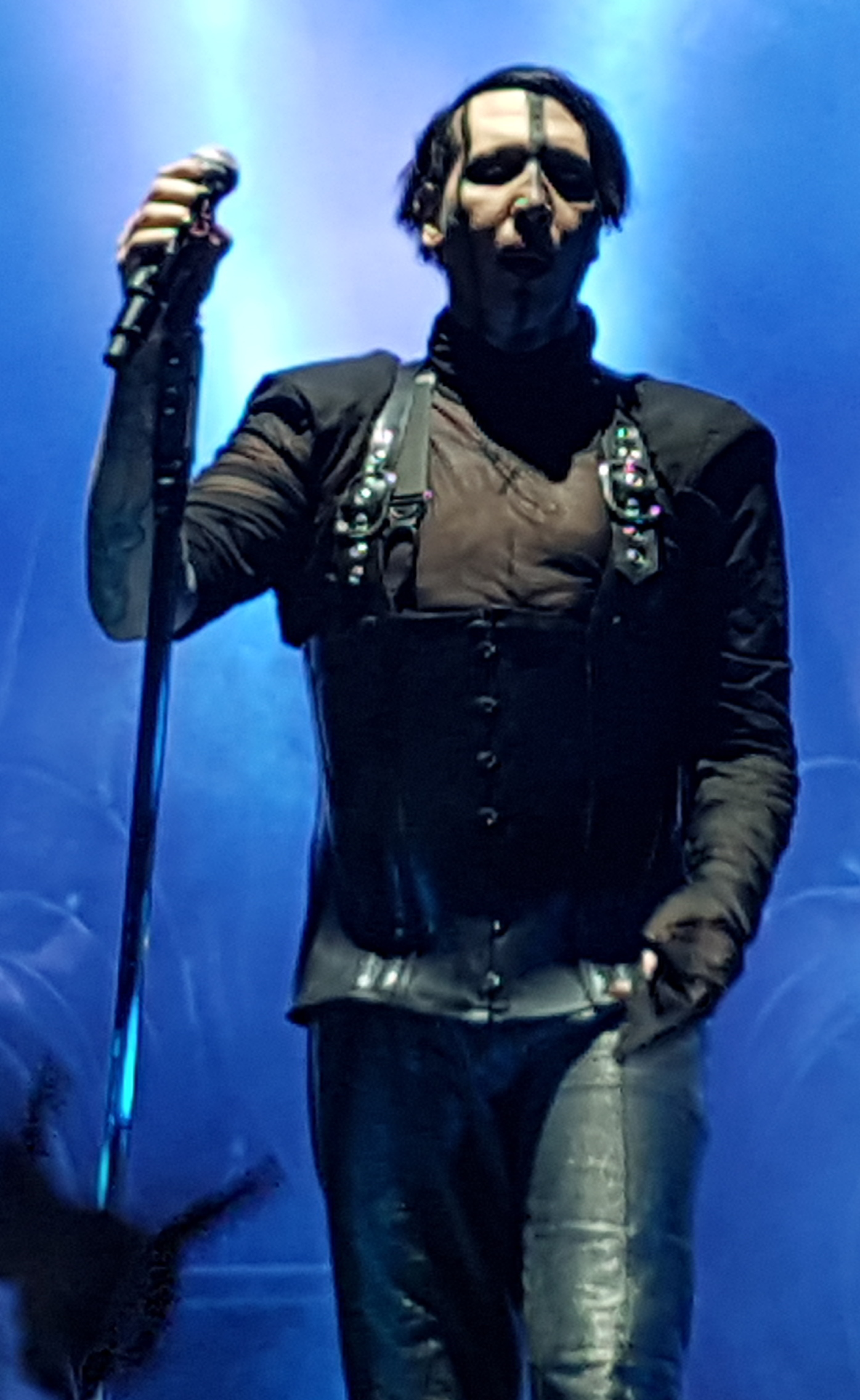
Marilyn Manson performing in 2017

The following is a list of recorded songs by American rock band Marilyn Manson. This list does not include remixes and alternate versions of songs.

Song Title	Year	Album	Length	Notes
"1996"	1996	Antichrist Superstar	4:01	
"Abuse, Part 1 (There Is Pain Involved)"	1995	Smells Like Children (Promo Version)	1:35	
"Abuse, Part 2 (Confessions)"	1995	Smells Like Children (Promo Version)	2:45	
"Angel with the Scabbed Wings"	1996	Antichrist Superstar	3:52	
"Antichrist Superstar"	1996	Antichrist Superstar	5:14	
"Apple of Sodom"	1997	Lost Highway soundtrack	4:26	
"Are You the Rabbit?"	2007	Eat Me, Drink Me	4:14	
"Arma-goddamn-motherfuckin-geddon"	2009	The High End of Low	3:39	
"As Sick as the Secrets Within"	2024	One Assassination Under God – Chapter 1	5:35	
"Astonishing Panorama of the Endtimes"	1999	The Last Tour on Earth	3:59	
"Baboon Rape Party"	2003	The Golden Age of Grotesque (UK & Japanese Editions)	2:41	
"The Beautiful People"	1996	Antichrist Superstar	3:38	
"Better of Two Evils"	2003	The Golden Age of Grotesque	3:48	
"Birds of Hell Awaiting"	2015	The Pale Emperor	5:05	
"Blank and White"	2009	The High End of Low	4:27	
"Blood Honey"	2017	Heaven Upside Down	4:10	
"Born Again"	2000	Holy Wood (In the Shadow of the Valley of Death)	3:20	
"Born Villain"	2012	Born Villain	5:27	
"Breaking the Same Old Ground"	2012	Born Villain	4:27	
"The Bright Young Things"	2003	The Golden Age of Grotesque	4:19	
"Broken Needle"	2020	We Are Chaos	5:23	
"Burning Flag"	2000	Holy Wood (In the Shadow of the Valley of Death)	3:21	
"Cake and Sodomy"	1994	Portrait of an American Family	3:53	
"Children of Cain"	2012	Born Villain	5:17	
"Coma Black"	2000	Holy Wood (In the Shadow of the Valley of Death)	5:59	
"Coma White"	1998	Mechanical Animals	5:38	
"Count to Six and Die (The Vacuum of Infinite Space Encompassing)"	2000	Holy Wood (In the Shadow of the Valley of Death)	3:24	
"Cruci-Fiction in Space"	2000	Holy Wood (In the Shadow of the Valley of Death)	4:56	
"Cry Little Sister"	2018	Non-album single	4:39	Gerard McMahon cover
"Cryptorchid"	1996	Antichrist Superstar	2:44	
"Cupid Carries a Gun"	2015	The Pale Emperor	4:59	
"Cyclops"	1994	Portrait of an American Family	3:32	
"Dancing with the One-Legged..."	1995	Smells Like Children	0:46	
"Death Is Not a Costume"	2024	One Assassination Under God – Chapter 1	4:32	
"The Death Song"	2000	Holy Wood (In the Shadow of the Valley of Death)	3:29	
"Deep Six"	2015	The Pale Emperor	5:02	
"Deformography"	1996	Antichrist Superstar	4:31	
"The Devil Beneath My Feet"	2015	The Pale Emperor	4:16	
"Devour"	2009	The High End of Low	3:46	
"Diamonds & Pollen"	2000	Non-album single B-side to "Disposable Teens"	3:55	
"Disassociative"	1998	Mechanical Animals	4:50	
"Disengaged"	2012	Born Villain	3:25	
"Disposable Teens"	2000	Holy Wood (In the Shadow of the Valley of Death)	3:01	
"Dogma"	1994	Portrait of an American Family	3:26	
"Doll-Dagga Buzz-Buzz Ziggety-Zag"	2003	The Golden Age of Grotesque	4:11	
"Don't Chase the Dead"	2020	We Are Chaos	4:17	
"Dope Hat"	1994	Portrait of an American Family	4:20	
"The Dope Show"	1998	Mechanical Animals	3:46	
"Down in the Park"	1994	Portrait of an American Family (Argentinian Edition)	5:00	Gary Numan cover
"Dried Up, Tied and Dead to the World"	1996	Antichrist Superstar	4:16	
"Eat Me, Drink Me"	2007	Eat Me, Drink Me	5:40	
"Empty Sounds of Hate"	1996	Antichrist Superstar	1:39	
"The End"	2020	Non-album single	8:29	The Doors cover
"Evidence"	2007	Eat Me, Drink Me	5:19	
"The Fall of Adam"	2000	Holy Wood (In the Shadow of the Valley of Death)	2:34	
"The Fight Song"	2000	Holy Wood (In the Shadow of the Valley of Death)	2:55	
"Filth"	1993	The Manson Family Album	4:31	
"Five to One"	2000	B-side to "Disposable Teens"	4:22	The Doors cover
"The Flowers of Evil"	2012	Born Villain	5:19	
"Four Rusted Horses"	2009	The High End of Low	5:00	
"Front Towards Enemy"	2024	Non-album single B-side to "Raise the Red Flag"	4:26	
"Fuck Frankie"	1995	Smells Like Children	1:48	
"Fundamentally Loathsome"	1998	Mechanical Animals	4:49	
"The Gardener"	2012	Born Villain	4:24	
"Get My Rocks Off"	1999	The Last Tour on Earth	3:05	Doctor Hook cover
"Get Your Gunn"	1994	Portrait of an American Family	3:17	
"GodEatGod"	2000	Holy Wood (In the Shadow of the Valley of Death)	2:34	
"God's Gonna Cut You Down"	2019	Non-album single	2:40	Traditional song
"The Golden Age of Grotesque"	2003	The Golden Age of Grotesque	4:05	
"Golden Years"	1998	"Dead Man on Campus soundtrack"	3:49	David Bowie cover
"Great Big White World"	1998	Mechanical Animals	5:01	
"Half-Way & One Step Forward"	2020	We Are Chaos	3:16	
"The Hands of Small Children"	1995	Smells Like Children	1:35	
"Heart-Shaped Glasses (When the Heart Guides the Hand)"	2007	Eat Me, Drink Me	5:05	
"Heaven Upside Down"	2017	Heaven Upside Down	4:49	
"Hey, Cruel World..."	2012	Born Villain	3:44	
"Highway to Hell"	1999	Detroit Rock City soundtrack	3:46	AC/DC cover
"I Don't Like the Drugs (But the Drugs Like Me)"	1998	Mechanical Animals	5:03	
"I Have to Look Up Just to See Hell"	2009	The High End of Low	4:12	
"Infinite Darkness"	2020	We Are Chaos	4:15	
"In the Air Tonight"	2025	Non-album single	5:01	Phil Collins cover
"I Put a Spell on You"	1995	Smells Like Children	3:37	Screamin' Jay Hawkins cover
"I Want to Disappear"	1998	Mechanical Animals	2:56	
"I Want to Kill You Like They Do in the Movies"	2009	The High End of Low	9:02	
"If I Was Your Vampire"	2007	Eat Me, Drink Me	5:56	
"In the Shadow of the Valley of Death"	2000	Holy Wood (In the Shadow of the Valley of Death)	4:09	
"Into the Fire"	2009	The High End of Low	5:15	
"Irresponsible Hate Anthem"	1996	Antichrist Superstar	4:17	
"Jesus Crisis"	2017	Heaven Upside Down	3:59	
"Just a Car Crash Away"	2007	Eat Me, Drink Me	4:55	
"Ka-Boom Ka-Boom"	2003	The Golden Age of Grotesque	4:02	
"Keep My Head Together"	2020	We Are Chaos	3:49	
"Kill4Me"	2017	Heaven Upside Down	3:59	
"Kinderfeld"	1996	Antichrist Superstar	4:51	
"King Kill 33º"	2000	Holy Wood (In the Shadow of the Valley of Death)	2:18	
"Killing Strangers"	2015	The Pale Emperor	5:36	
"The KKK Took My Baby Away"	2003	We're a Happy Family: A Tribute to Ramones	3:43	The Ramones cover
"The La La Song"	2003	Party Monster soundtrack	1:32	
"Lamb of God"	2000	Holy Wood (In the Shadow of the Valley of Death)	4:39	
"The Last Day on Earth"	1998	Mechanical Animals	5:01	
"Lay Down Your Goddamn Arms"	2012	Born Villain	4:13	
"Leave a Scar"	2009	The High End of Low	3:55	
"Little Horn"	1996	Antichrist Superstar	2:43	
"Long Hard Road Out of Hell"	1997	Spawn: The Album	4:21	
"The Love Song"	2000	Holy Wood (In the Shadow of the Valley of Death)	3:16	
"Lunchbox"	1994	Portrait of an American Family	4:34	
"Man That You Fear"	1996	Antichrist Superstar	6:10	
"May Cause Discoloration of the Urine or Feces"	1995	Smells Like Children	3:59	
"Mechanical Animals"	1998	Mechanical Animals	4:33	
"Meet Me in Purgatory"	2024	One Assassination Under God – Chapter 1	4:36	
"The Mephistopheles of Los Angeles"	2015	The Pale Emperor	4:57	
"Mind of a Lunatic"	2003	B-side of This_Is_the_New_Shit	9:47	Geto Boys cover
"Minute of Decay"	1996	Antichrist Superstar	4:44	
"Misery Machine"	1994	Portrait of an American Family	13:09	
"Mister Superstar"	1996	Antichrist Superstar	5:04	
"Mobscene"	2003	The Golden Age of Grotesque	3:25	
"Murderers Are Getting Prettier Every Day"	2012	Born Villain	4:18	
"Mutilation Is the Most Sincere Form of Flattery"	2007	Eat Me, Drink Me	3:52	
"My Monkey"	1994	Portrait of an American Family	4:31	
"New Model No. 15"	1998	Mechanical Animals	3:40	
"No Funeral Without Applause"	2024	One Assassination Under God – Chapter 1	4:06	
"No Reflection"	2012	Born Villain	4:36	
"The Nobodies"	2000	Holy Wood (In the Shadow of the Valley of Death)	3:35	
"Obsequey (The Death of Art)"	2003	The Golden Age of Grotesque	1:34	
"Odds of Even"	2015	The Pale Emperor	6:22	
"One Assassination Under God"	2024	One Assassination Under God – Chapter 1	5:28	
"Organ Grinder"	1994	Portrait of an American Family	4:22	
"Overneath the Path of Misery"	2012	Born Villain	5:18	
"Paint You with My Love"	2020	We Are Chaos	4:29	
"Para-noir"	2003	The Golden Age of Grotesque	6:01	
"Perfume"	2020	We Are Chaos	3:33	
"Personal Jesus"	2004	Lest We Forget: The Best Of	4:06	Depeche Mode cover
"Pistol Whipped"	2012	Born Villain	4:10	
"A Place in the Dirt"	2000	Holy Wood (In the Shadow of the Valley of Death)	3:37	
"Posthuman"	1998	Mechanical Animals	4:17	
"Prelude (The Family Trip)"	1994	Portrait of an American Family	1:22	
""President Dead""	2000	Holy Wood (In the Shadow of the Valley of Death)	4:18	
"Pretty as a Swastika"	2009	The High End of Low	2:45	
"Putting Holes in Happiness"	2007	Eat Me, Drink Me	4:31	
"Raise the Red Flag"	2024	One Assassination Under God – Chapter 1	4:49	
"Red Black and Blue"	2020	We Are Chaos	5:03	
"The Red Carpet Grave"	2007	Eat Me, Drink Me	4:05	
"Redeemer"	2002	Queen of the Damned soundtrack	4:19	
"The Reflecting God"	1996	Antichrist Superstar	5:36	
"Revelation #9"	1994	B-side to "Get Your Gunn"	12:57	
"Revelation #12"	2017	Heaven Upside Down	4:42	
"Rock Is Dead"	1998	Mechanical Animals	3:09	
"Rock N Roll Nigger"	1995	Smells Like Children	3:32	Patti Smith cover
"A Rose and a Baby Ruth"	1999	The Last Tour on Earth	2:17	George Hamilton IV cover
"Running to the Edge of the World"	2009	The High End of Low	6:26	
"Sacrifice of the Mass"	2024	One Assassination Under God – Chapter 1	6:15	
"Sacrilegious"	2024	One Assassination Under God – Chapter 1	3:35	
"(s)AINT"	2003	The Golden Age of Grotesque	3:42	
"Saturnalia"	2017	Heaven Upside Down	7:59	
"Say10"	2017	Heaven Upside Down	4:18	
"Scabs, Guns and Peanut Butter"	1995	Smells Like Children	1:01	
"Shitty Chicken Gang Bang"	1995	Smells Like Children	1:19	
"Sick City"	2000	Released via podcast	2:03	Charles Manson cover
"Slave Only Dreams to Be King"	2015	The Pale Emperor	5:20	
"Slo-Mo-Tion"	2012	Born Villain	4:24	
"Slutgarden"	2003	The Golden Age of Grotesque	4:06	
"Snake Eyes and Sissies"	1994	Portrait of an American Family	4:07	
"♠"	2003	The Golden Age of Grotesque	4:34	
"Solve Coagula"	2020	We Are Chaos	4:22	
"The Speed of Pain"	1998	Mechanical Animals	5:30	
"Stigmata"	2017	Atomic Blonde soundtrack	4:01	
"The Suck for Your Solution"	1997	Private Parts soundtrack	5:36	
"Suicide Is Painless"	2000	Book of Shadows: Blair Witch 2 soundtrack	3:46	The Mash cover
"Sweet Dreams (Are Made of This)"	1995	Smells Like Children	4:53	Eurythmics cover
"Sweet Tooth"	1994	Portrait of an American Family	5:03	
"Sympathy for the Parents"	1995	Smells Like Children	1:01	
"Tainted Love"	2003	The Golden Age of Grotesque	3:24	Gloria Jones cover
"Target Audience (Narcissus Narcosis)"	2000	Holy Wood (In the Shadow of the Valley of Death)	4:18	
"Tattooed in Reverse"	2017	Heaven Upside Down	4:24	
"Thaeter"	2003	The Golden Age of Grotesque	1:14	
"They Said That Hell's Not Hot"	2007	Eat Me, Drink Me	4:17	
"Third Day of a Seven Day Binge"	2015	The Pale Emperor	4:26	
"This Is Halloween"	2006	The Nightmare Before Christmas soundtrack (2006 bonus disc)	3:22	Danny Elfman cover
"This Is the New Shit"	2003	The Golden Age of Grotesque	4:20	
"Threats of Romance"	2017	Heaven Upside Down	4:37	
"Tourniquet"	1996	Antichrist Superstar	4:29	
"Unkillable Monster"	2009	The High End of Low	3:44	
"Untitled"	1998	Mechanical Animals	1:22	
"Use Your Fist and Not Your Mouth"	2003	The Golden Age of Grotesque	3:34	
"User Friendly"	1998	Mechanical Animals	4:17	
"Valentine's Day"	2000	Holy Wood (In the Shadow of the Valley of Death)	3:31	
"Vodevil"	2003	The Golden Age of Grotesque	4:39	
"Warship My Wreck"	2015	The Pale Emperor	5:57	
"We Are Chaos"	2020	We Are Chaos	4:00	
"We Know Where You Fucking Live"	2017	Heaven Upside Down	4:32	
"We're from America"	2009	The High End of Low	5:04	
"Wight Spider"	2009	The High End of Low	5:33	
"Working Class Hero"	2004	Lest We Forget: The Best Of	3:39	John Lennon cover
"Wormboy"	1996	Antichrist Superstar	3:56	
"WOW"	2009	The High End of Low	4:55	
"Wrapped in Plastic"	1994	Portrait of an American Family	5:35	
"You and Me and the Devil Makes 3"	2007	Eat Me, Drink Me	4:24	
"You're So Vain"	2012	Born Villain	4:02	Carly Simon cover; featuring Johnny Depp
"15"	2009	The High End of Low	4:21	
