= The End Times Tour =

2015 concert tour by the Smashing Pumpkins and Marilyn Manson

- Tour by The Smashing Pumpkins and Marilyn Manson
- Promotional poster for The End Times Tour
- Start date: July 7, 2015
- End date: August 9, 2015
- Legs: 1
- No. of shows: 23 in North America
Marilyn Manson tour chronology
- The Hell Not Hallelujah Tour
- (2015–16)
- The End Times Tour
- (2015)
- Heaven Upside Down Tour
- (2017–18)
The Smashing Pumpkins tour chronology
- In Plainsong
- (2015)
- The End Times Tour
- (2015)
- Shiny and Oh So Bright Tour
- (2018)

The End Times Tour was a double bill North American concert tour, co-headlined by American rock bands Marilyn Manson and The Smashing Pumpkins, with Cage opening. It was launched as a supporting 'tour within a tour' for Marilyn Manson's The Hell Not Hallelujah Tour. The End Times Tour supported both Manson's ninth studio album The Pale Emperor (2015) and the Smashing Pumpkins' tenth studio release, Monuments to an Elegy (2014).

The tour began on July 7 in Concord, California and concluded in Cincinnati on August 8. It spanned 23 dates and visited arenas in the United States and Canada. American hip hop recording artist Cage served as the opening act for the entirety of the tour. The tour's name was conceived as an amalgamation of the title of a song by each artist, the Pumpkins' "The End Is the Beginning Is the End" and Manson's "Astonishing Panorama of the Endtimes".

Following its conclusion, Marilyn Manson resumed their The Hell Not Hallelujah Tour, with three dates scheduled in Japan from August 14 onwards, and a European tour in November.

== Background ==
Corgan and Manson's friendship dates back to the late 1990s, with Corgan serving as an unofficial consultant for the band during the early development stages of Manson's 1998 album Mechanical Animals. After playing a few of the early songs for him, Corgan advised the band that "This is definitely the right direction" but to "go all the way with it. Don't just hint at it," referring to the album's glam rock production style. The album, produced by Manson, Sean Beavan and Michael Beinhorn, was released on September 15, 1998, and went on to debut at number one on the Billboard 200, with first week sales of 223,000.

Following the release of Mechanical Animals, the pair's personal and professional relationship soured. A fifteen-year-long feud allegedly stemmed from Corgan writing a "strongly worded" letter to Manson, in which he claimed that actress Rose McGowan – who Manson was engaged to at the time – would "ruin my life and my career if I stayed with her." Manson responded by telling Corgan that "it would be a good marketing idea [to sell] Charlie Brown T-shirts and bald caps at [his] concerts", due to their similarity in appearance.

The pair publicly settled their rift when Manson performed his own "Third Day of a Seven Day Binge" and the Smashing Pumpkin's "Ava Adore" at the Camden Palace Theatre in London on December 5, 2014. They went on to perform the latter track again, when both bands appeared at the Australian music festival Soundwave.

== Set lists ==
Marilyn Manson

1. "Deep Six"
2. "Disposable Teens"
3. "mOBSCENE"
4. "No Reflection"
5. "Third Day of a Seven Day Binge"
6. "Sweet Dreams (Are Made of This)"
7. "Angel With the Scabbed Wings"
8. "The Love Song" or "Personal Jesus"
9. "The Dope Show"
10. "Rock Is Dead"
11. "Lunchbox"
12. "Antichrist Superstar"
13. "The Beautiful People"

Encore

1. "Coma White" or "Tourniquet" or "Man That You Fear"

The Smashing Pumpkins

1. "Cherub Rock"
2. "Bullet with Butterfly Wings"
3. "Tonight, Tonight"
4. "Ava Adore"
5. "Drum + Fife"
6. "One and All (We Are)"
7. "The Everlasting Gaze"
8. "Zero"
9. "The Crying Tree of Mercury"
10. "Mayonaise"
11. "Disarm"
12. "Landslide"
13. "1979"
14. "Run2Me"
15. "Thru the Eyes of Ruby"
16. "Stand Inside Your Love"
17. "United States"

Encore

1. "Today" or "Geek U.S.A." or "Cardinal Rule"

== Shows ==
List of 2015 concerts, showing date, city, country, and venue
Date	City	Country	Venue	Opening Act	Attendance	Revenue
July 7, 2015	Concord	United States	Concord Pavilion	Cage	—N/a	—N/a
July 9, 2015	Irvine	United States	Verizon Wireless Amphitheatre	Cage	—N/a	—N/a
July 10, 2015	Las Vegas	United States	The Joint	Cage	4,136 / 4,136	$313,578
July 11, 2015	Phoenix	United States	Comerica Theatre	Cage	—N/a	—N/a
July 13, 2015	Morrison	United States	Red Rocks Amphitheatre	Cage	—N/a	—N/a
July 15, 2015	Dallas	United States	Gexa Energy Pavilion	Cage	—N/a	—N/a
July 16, 2015	Houston	United States	NRG Arena	Cage	—N/a	—N/a
July 18, 2015	San Antonio	United States	Freeman Coliseum	Cage	—N/a	—N/a
July 19, 2015	Austin	United States	Austin City Limits Live	Cage	—N/a	—N/a
July 20, 2015	New Orleans	United States	Bold Sphere Music	Cage	—N/a	—N/a
July 22, 2015	Miami	United States	Bayfront Park Amphitheatre	Cage	—N/a	—N/a
July 24, 2015	Tampa	United States	MidFlorida Amphitheatre	Cage	—N/a	—N/a
July 25, 2015	Atlanta	United States	Aaron's Amphitheatre	Cage	—N/a	—N/a
July 26, 2015	Raleigh	United States	Red Hat Amphitheater	Cage	—N/a	—N/a
July 28, 2015	Boston	United States	Leader Bank Pavilion	Cage	—N/a	—N/a
July 29, 2015	Holmdel	United States	PNC Bank Arts Center	Cage	—N/a	—N/a
July 31, 2015	Wantagh	United States	Jones Beach Theater	Cage	—N/a	—N/a
August 1, 2015	Mashantucket	United States	Grand Theater	Cage	—N/a	—N/a
August 2, 2015	Camden	United States	Susquehanna Bank Center	Cage	—N/a	—N/a
August 4, 2015	Toronto	Canada	Molson Amphitheatre	Cage	—N/a	—N/a
August 5, 2015	Clarkston	United States	DTE Energy Music Theatre	Cage	10,159 / 15,040	$286,693
August 7, 2015	Chicago	United States	FirstMerit Bank Pavilion	Cage	—N/a	—N/a
August 8, 2015	Cincinnati	United States	Riverbend Music Center	Cage	—N/a	—N/a
August 9, 2015	Nashville	United States	Ascend Amphitheater	Cage	—N/a	—N/a

== Lineup ==
Marilyn Manson

- Marilyn Manson – vocals
- Twiggy – bass guitar
- Paul Wiley – lead guitar
- Gil Sharone – drums
- Daniel Fox – keyboards, percussion

The Smashing Pumpkins

- Billy Corgan – vocals, guitar
- Jeff Schroeder – guitar
- Jack Bates – bass
- Jimmy Chamberlin – drums
