= Hell, etc. =

Hell, etc. may refer to:

- Hell, etc. (label), a vanity label founded by Marilyn Manson
- Hell, etc. (exhibition), an art exhibition by Marilyn Manson held in Athens, Greece
