= Killing Strangers =

Song by Marilyn Manson

from the album The Pale Emperor
- Released: October 21, 2014
- Recorded: 2014; Los Angeles, California (Abattoir Studios; Igloo Studios)
- Genre: Industrial metal
- Length: 5:36
- Label: Hell, etc.; Cooking Vinyl
- Songwriters: Marilyn Manson; Tyler Bates
- Producers: Manson; Bates

"Killing Strangers" is a song by American rock band Marilyn Manson. It is the first track from their ninth studio album, The Pale Emperor (2015). It was written and produced by the eponymous lead singer and Tyler Bates and was first released when it appeared in Keanu Reeves's 2014 film John Wick. The song was inspired by the PTSD experienced by Manson's father after his time spent serving in the US Armed Forces during the Vietnam War. The track peaked within the top ten of the Billboard Hard Rock Digital Songs. The song garnered generally positive reviews from music critics, with several publications favorably comparing the song to several of the band's previous album openers.

== Background and recording ==
The song was one of the final tracks recorded for The Pale Emperor, and its composition was inspired by the PTSD exhibited by Manson's father, Hugh Warner, after his time spent serving in the US military during the Vietnam War. Shortly after the death of his mother in 2014, Manson and his father spent an evening watching Francis Ford Coppola's 1979 film Apocalypse Now and smoking marijuana. Hugh Warner characterized the film as "the most accurate portrayal of the Vietnam War", and spent the evening describing events which Manson had "never heard before, in my whole childhood". Manson had publicly discussed his father's role in spraying Agent Orange over the Vietnamese jungle during the conflict. Hugh Warner would go on to recount how "when people talk about [PTSD], I don't think they understand that when you've killed so many people and then you have to come back to a normal world, it's very difficult to re-adjust to it", with Manson explaining that the lyric 'We're killing strangers so we don't kill the ones that we love' "became so much about my father and my mother".

== Composition and style ==
"Killing Strangers" is a downtempo rock song which runs for a duration of five minutes and 36 seconds. According to Ultimate Guitar, the song has a slow tempo of 60 beats per minute in a time signature of 4/4. It is composed of verses sung over a continuously repeating D minor drone harmony throughout, with choruses following a chord sequence of Dm-F-Bb-Gm. The track has been described as a "slow burner", and "atmospheric", and has been favorably compared to some of the band's previous album openers, including "GodEatGod" from Holy Wood (In the Shadow of the Valley of Death) (2001) and "If I Was Your Vampire" from Eat Me, Drink Me (2007).

== Release and promotion ==
It was first released on October 24, 2014, when it was prominently featured in the movie John Wick, starring Keanu Reeves. The song's cowriter, Tyler Bates, has stated that John Wick directors Chad Stahelski and David Leitch were fans of Manson's work and they "wanted to have something [from] Manson in the movie". An initial meeting with the films' musical supervisor resulted in the supervisor, Reeves and the two directors being invited to Bates' home recording studio, where they were played an unmixed version of the entire album. According to Bates, the four expressed an interest in also featuring The Pale Emperor album track "Warship My Wreck" in the film, but that "via osmosis, there wasn't really an appropriate place for that song". The version of "Killing Strangers" used in the movie is an unmixed demo, lacking some of the guitar overdubs found on the album version.

The album version, on the other hand, is used in S.W.A.T. television series (Season 1, Ep. 13, 0:31).

It is also used in Lovecraft Country, an HBO series (Season 1, Ep. 2). and in the NBC show The Blacklist (Season 7, Ep. 12).It is also used in The Vampire Diaries (season 7, Ep. 12)

== Critical reception ==
Shaun Tandon of Yahoo! News praised the song's lyrics as Manson "once more [belittling] society for a selective condemnation of violence", and complimented the shift in genre which the song represented, explaining that the song "starts with the heavy thump of bass and drums familiar to longtime fans, but is immediately followed by a guitar that owes more to Mississippi Delta bluesmen than to the arena heavy metal that was Manson's most obvious influence". Dave Simpson of Puremzine complimented Manson's vocals as "characteristically demented". Terry Bezer from Classic Rock called the track "a stunning yet understated open to the record", while Chad Childers from Loudwire referred to the song as "one of [the albums] standout tracks". In his review of the album, Dean Brown of The Quietus said that the song's chorus was "brilliant", while Jon Dolan of Rolling Stone called the song's chorus a "zombified blues crawl with a rusty-hinge riff". Jonathan Barkan from Bloody Disgusting said that the song begins the album with "a southern grit-infused industrial groove", and said that the drums "elicit an almost militaristic rhythm, giving weight to the almost genocidal lyrics".

== Credits and personnel ==
Credits adapted from the liner notes of The Pale Emperor.

Credits

- Recorded at Abattoir Studios, Studio City, California
- Drums recorded by Gustavo Borner at Igloo Studios, Burbank, California
- Songs of Golgotha (BMI)/Tyler Bates Music, Inc. (BMI), under exclusive licence to Cooking Vinyl

Personnel

- Marilyn Manson – songwriter, lead vocals, producer
- Tyler Bates – songwriter, guitar, bass guitar, programming, producer
- Gil Sharone – drums
- Robert Carranza – mixing
- Dylan Eiland – additional programming
- Joanne Higginbottom – Pro Tools editing
- Brian Lucey – mastering
- Wolfgang Matthes – additional programming, mixing

== Charts ==
Chart (2015)	Peak position
US Hard Rock Digital Songs (Billboard)	10
