= Cupid Carries a Gun =

Single by Marilyn Manson

from the album The Pale Emperor
- Released: January 7, 2015
- Genre: Blues rock
- Length: 4:59
- Label: Hell, etc.; Loma Vista
- Songwriter(s): Marilyn Manson; Tyler Bates
- Producer(s): Manson; Bates

Marilyn Manson singles chronology
"Deep Six" (2014)	"Cupid Carries a Gun" (2015)	"We Know Where You Fucking Live" (2017)

"Cupid Carries a Gun" is a song by American rock band Marilyn Manson. It was released as the third single from their ninth studio album, The Pale Emperor (2015).

== Background and development ==
The lyrics to "Cupid Carries a Gun" were the first written by Manson for The Pale Emperor, although it was the final track to be recorded for the album. The song was co-written and produced with composer Tyler Bates, who was scheduled to begin scoring music for the US television series Salem shortly after work on The Pale Emperor was completed. "Cupid Carries a Gun" was still in an embryonic, "draft" stage when Bates started work on the score, who said that the track "immediately came to mind" when watching the opening title sequence to the show. After playing the sequence to Manson, the pair then began work on the track, which developed from its "draft" stage to the final album version over the course of a single night. The following day, Bates played the song for one of the show's producers, Brannon Braga, who said that it was the "perfect tone and attitude" for Salem.

== Recording and composition ==
"Cupid Carries a Gun" (2015)
A 30 second sample of "Cupid Carries a Gun", as it appeared on The Pale Emperor.

"Cupid Carries a Gun" is a midtempo blues-inspired rock song, which runs for a duration of four minutes and 59 seconds. The song begins with "ghost-like" electric-guitar, piano and an acoustic blues-guitar line, with Manson referencing "witch drums" on the intro. The song's lyrics go on to incorporate numerous other references to witchcraft, before invoking snakes, spiders and "black crow eyes". The title of the tour promoting The Pale Emperor, The Hell Not Hallelujah Tour, is derived from a lyric found on "Cupid Carries a Gun".

According to Ultimate Guitar, the song is written in common time with a moderately fast tempo of 120 beats per minute. The track follows a basic sequence of Em–D–Cm_{7}–Bsus_{4}–Bsus_{4}/G–Bsus_{4}/F# in the verse, while the chorus has a progression of E–G–D–A–E–G.

== Release and artwork ==
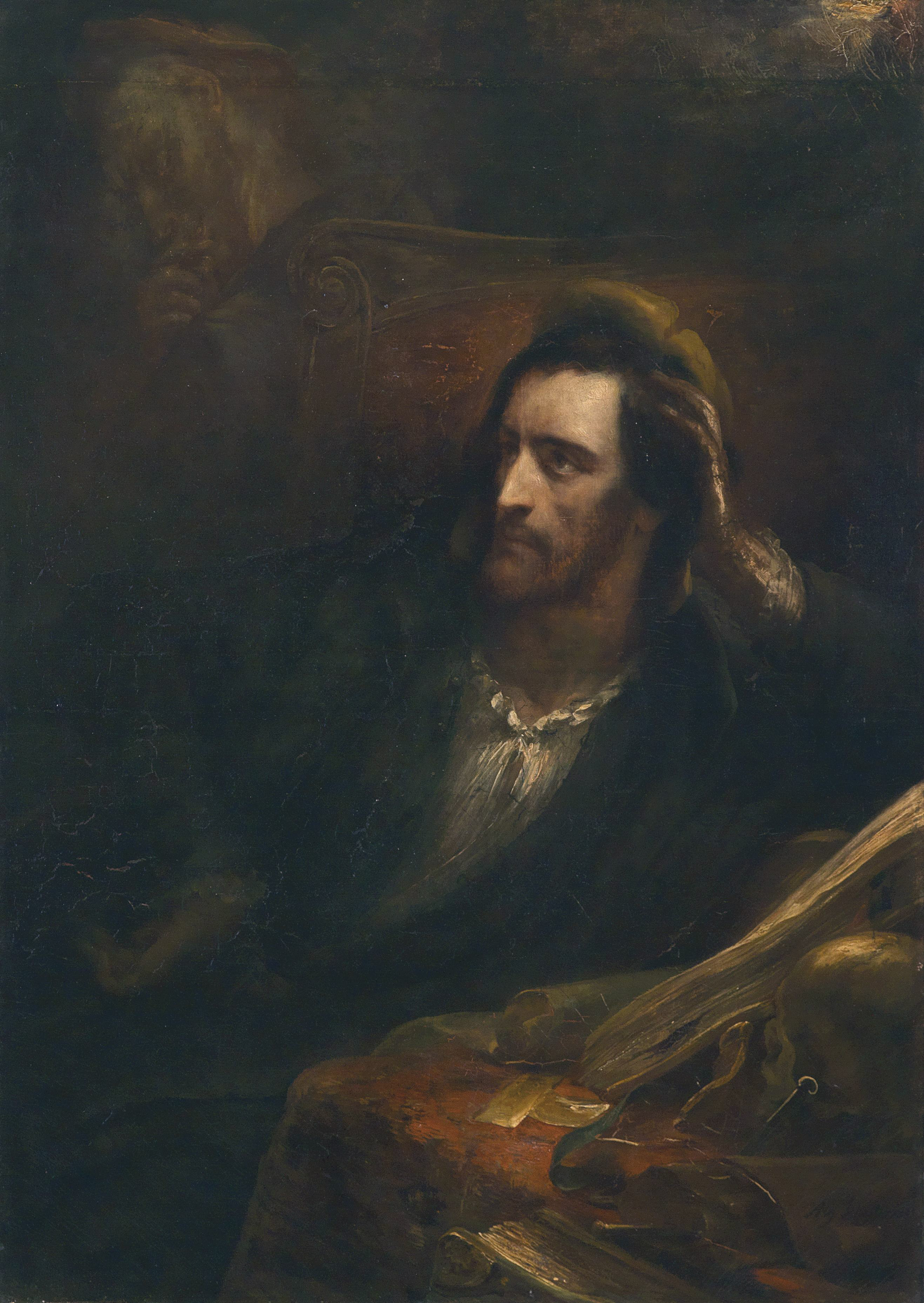
Faust in seiner Studierstube.

A 51-second portion of the track was first heard as the theme to Salem, which premiered on US television on April 27, 2014, with the song marking Manson's debut as a score composer. In promotion for the release of The Pale Emperor, the track was released as the third single from the album on streaming services such as Spotify and Rhapsody, and for download on iTunes and Amazon on January 7, 2015. The same day, a video containing the audio of "Cupid Carries a Gun" was uploaded on to Manson's official Vevo channel, where it has gone on to receive over one million views. The single's artwork was taken by photographer Nicholas Cope, and is inspired by Ary Scheffer's 1831 work Faust in seiner Studierstude.

== Track listing ==
Digital single

1. "Cupid Carries a Gun" - 4:59

== Personnel ==
Credits adapted from the liner notes of The Pale Emperor.

- Recorded at Abattoir Studios, Studio City, California
- Drums recorded by Gustavo Borner at Igloo Studios, Burbank, California
- Songs of Golgotha (BMI)/Tyler Bates Music, Inc. (BMI), under exclusive licence to Loma Vista Recordings and Cooking Vinyl

Musicians

- Marilyn Manson – songwriter, lead vocals, producer
- Tyler Bates – songwriter, acoustic guitar, electric guitar, bass guitar, keyboards, programming, producer
- Gil Sharone – drums
- Robert Carranza – mixing
- Dylan Eiland – additional programming
- Joanne Higginbottom – Pro Tools editing
- Brian Lucey – mastering
- Wolfgang Matthes – additional programming, mixing

== Release history ==
Region	Date	Format	Label	Ref.
Worldwide	January 7, 2015	Streaming	Loma Vista Recordings	
Worldwide	January 7, 2015	Digital download	Loma Vista Recordings	
