= The Devil Beneath My Feet =

- UK edition

Promotional single by Marilyn Manson

from the album The Pale Emperor
- Released: December 6, 2015
- Recorded: 2014; Los Angeles, California (Abattoir Studios; Igloo Studios)
- Genre: Glam rock
- Length: 4:16
- Label: Hell, etc.; Cooking Vinyl
- Songwriters: Marilyn Manson; Tyler Bates
- Producers: Manson; Bates

"The Devil Beneath My Feet" is a song by American rock band Marilyn Manson. It was released as the second promotional single from the band's ninth studio album, The Pale Emperor (2015).

== Release and promotion ==
"The Devil Beneath My Feet" was first released on January 15, 2015 as the seventh track on the band's ninth studio album, The Pale Emperor. Editions of the album sold at Walmart stores in the US feature a heavily censored version of the track. Manson would go on to criticize the store and its gun sales policy, categorizing Walmart in an Australian interview as "that store in America which sells guns to kids but won't sell R-rated lyrics." Manson went on to joke that he might "do a signing at a Walmart store where I just sign guns, and you get a free record with it when you buy a gun."

In October 2015, promotional copies of the song were issued to French radio stations, where the song was to be released as an airplay-only single. Promotion was scheduled to coincide with the band's performance at Le Zénith in Paris on November 16, 2015. However, following the Parisian terrorist attacks on November 13 and authorities subsequently forcing the closure of the venue, the release of the single and all promotional activity were canceled. A planned December 6 release date did proceed as planned in the UK, however, where it was serviced to radio stations as the third single taken from the album.

== Composition and style ==
"The Devil Beneath My Feet"
A 30-second sample of "The Devil Beneath My Feet", as it appeared on The Pale Emperor

"The Devil Beneath My Feet" is an uptempo rock song which runs for a duration of four minutes and 16 seconds. Incorporating elements of glam rock and psychedelia, the track has been compared to some of the material found on the band's 1998 album, Mechanical Animals. The song is relatively sparse, beginning with an unaccompanied drum track on the intro, which is coupled in the verse with a prominently featured bassline. The track is then augmented in the chorus by the inclusion of psychedelic-influenced electric guitar lines. According to Ultimate Guitar, the song is written in common time with a moderately fast tempo of 127 beats per minute. The bassline in the verse is composed of two repetitions of a basic G–D–A–E sequence, while the electric guitar in the chorus has a progression of Em–B–G–D–A–E.

Lyrically, the song was initially inspired by a text message Manson sent to then-girlfriend Lindsay Usich, which read "Don't bring your black heart to bed/ When I wake up, you best be gone or you better be dead." The song would go on to contain numerous metaphors and references to theology and mathematics, specifically Young's inequality, with the lyric "It's better to be blamed for robbing Peter than guilty for paying Paul." Terry Bezer from Classic Rock described the latter as "one of the coolest lyrics in Manson's arsenal."

== Critical reception ==
The song garnered generally positive reviews from music critics. In his review of the album for Rolling Stone, Jon Dolan called it "one of the album's best songs", and said that it sounds "like a beach party on the River Styx." Dave Simpson of Pure M magazine said that the song takes the album in a "different direction", suggesting it was "more mellow" when compared to other tracks found on The Pale Emperor. He praised its "hushed vocals and reticent yet striking guitars." Dean Brown of The Quietus called the song "brilliant in its simplicity", while Terry Bezer from Classic Rock was similarly complimentary, saying that the song has "an oddly Mechanical Animals feel to it, those guitar lines exploding with excess and elegantly wasted gasconade."

== Track listing ==
- French Promo CD
1. "The Devil Beneath My Feet" (Radio Edit) – 3:28
- UK Promo CD (FRYCD737P)
1. "The Devil Beneath My Feet" (Clean Edit) – 3:29
2. "The Devil Beneath My Feet" (Album Version) – 4:16

== Credits and personnel ==
Credits adapted from the liner notes of The Pale Emperor.

- Recorded at Abattoir Studios, Studio City, California
- Drums recorded by Gustavo Borner at Igloo Studios, Burbank, California
- Songs of Golgotha (BMI)/Tyler Bates Music, Inc. (BMI), under exclusive licence to Cooking Vinyl

Personnel

- Marilyn Manson – songwriter, lead vocals, producer
- Tyler Bates – songwriter, guitar, bass guitar, keyboards, programming, producer
- Gil Sharone – drums
- Robert Carranza – mixing
- Dylan Eiland – additional programming
- Joanne Higginbottom – Pro Tools editing
- Brian Lucey – mastering
- Wolfgang Matthes – additional programming, mixing

== Release history ==
Region	Date	Format	Label	Ref.
France	October 2015	Airplay	Cooking Vinyl	
United Kingdom	December 6, 2015	Airplay	Cooking Vinyl	
