= Deep Six (song) =

Single by Marilyn Manson

from the album The Pale Emperor
- Released: December 16, 2014
- Genre: Post-punk; heavy metal; glam rock; gothic rock
- Length: 5:03 (album version); 4:10 (radio edit)
- Label: Hell, etc.; Loma Vista; Cooking Vinyl
- Songwriters: Marilyn Manson; Tyler Bates
- Producers: Manson; Bates

Marilyn Manson singles chronology
"Third Day of a Seven Day Binge" (2014)	"Deep Six" (2014)	"Cupid Carries a Gun" (2015)

Music video
- "Deep Six" (Explicit) on YouTube "Deep Six" (Audio) on YouTube

"Deep Six" is a song by American rock band Marilyn Manson. The song was released to digital outlets on December 16, 2014, as the second single from the band's ninth studio album, The Pale Emperor (2015). A music video directed by Bart Hess was released on YouTube. The song was a hit on American Active Rock radio, peaking at number eight on Billboard's Mainstream Rock, becoming the band's highest-peaking single ever on that chart.

== Composition ==
Tim Noakes of Dazed wrote that the song is about "sin and sex."

== Release ==
The song was released as a one-track single via music download services on December 16, 2014, as the second single taken from the album. A limited edition CD was released exclusively at Best Buy stores in the US a week later on December 23, containing both the album's first single "Third Day of a Seven Day Binge" and "Deep Six" as double A-sides. A limited amount of these CDs came bundled with an exclusive T-shirt. "Deep Six" also appeared on the soundtrack to the video game WWE 2K16.

== Music video ==
A music video directed by textile design artist Bart Hess was released on to YouTube on December 19 to promote the single. Despite often being described as making heavy-use of computer-generated imagery, Hess has said on his Facebook account that the video was made "without the use of any CGI." The video is inspired by the snake-on-a-staircase scene from Beetlejuice, with the "snake" imagery based on textured fabric designs Hess had previously created. The music video features dancer Amy Gilson and Burlesque artist Olivia Bellafontaine.

The video met with positive reception from critics. Graham Hartmann of Loudwire compared the video to some of Manson's previous work, saying that he has "delivered some of the most iconic and visually disturbing music videos ever to be aired on MTV and the like, but "Deep Six" embraces a minimalistic quality with a bit of sci-fi weirdness to boot." Music Times noted that "Marilyn Manson [has always liked] to make you feel uncomfortable with his music and videos. While [Deep Six] is not one of Manson's craziest videos, it still gives you the creeps. In a good way."

=== Synopsis ===
The video begins with footage of Manson standing in front of a white screen, performing the song while wearing a "reverse reverend outfit." As a nude Amy Gilson contorts her body, a rippling growth appears across the screen before breaking apart into several segments. The black cylindrical waveform slowly consumes Gilson's body while pulling it together and breaking it apart from multiple directions. Later in the video, it's revealed that Manson's head is leading the waveform. Another scene in the video makes use of the infinity mirror effect. In a scene which Rolling Stone described as "phallic", the black cylindrical waveform delves into Manson's open mouth, and upon reversing direction, exposes never-ending rows of the black waveform protruding from his own mouth.

== Chart performance ==
The song debuted at No. 33 on Billboard's Mainstream Rock Chart on the issue dated December 23, 2014 as the "greatest gainer" that week, before rising to No. 8 on the chart dated March 14, 2015, making it the band's highest-peaking single ever on the chart. The song also debuted at No. 46 on the US Active Rock chart with 186 spins, and by January 6, the song had risen to No. 22 with 392 spins. Adam Farell, creative director at Loma Vista Recordings, said that the song's chart performance in late December was a "very, very good start" as "this is stations just wanting to play the song based on the reaction the fans had", stating that the song's official add date at radio stations in the US was scheduled for January. The song went on to peak at No. 8 with 1,206 spins on the week ending March 10, 2015.

== Track listing and formats ==
Digital single

1. "Deep Six" – 5:03

Best Buy-exclusive CD single

1. "Third Day of a Seven Day Binge" – 4:27
2. "Deep Six" – 5:03

== Credits and personnel ==
Credits adapted from the liner notes of The Pale Emperor.

- Recorded at Abattoir Studios, Studio City, California
- Drums recorded by Gustavo Borner at Igloo Studios, Burbank, California
- Songs of Golgotha (BMI)/Tyler Bates Music, Inc. (BMI), under exclusive licence to Cooking Vinyl and Loma Vista Recordings

Personnel

- Marilyn Manson – songwriter, lead vocals, producer
- Tyler Bates – songwriter, electric guitar, bass guitar, keyboards, programming, producer
- Gil Sharone – drums
- Robert Carranza – mixing
- Dylan Eiland – additional programming
- Joanne Higginbottom – Pro Tools editing
- Brian Lucey – mastering
- Wolfgang Matthes – additional programming, mixing

== Charts ==
=== Weekly charts ===
Chart (2015)	Peak position
Canada Active Rock (America's Music Charts)	29
Germany Alternative Single Charts (Deutsche Alternative Charts)	1
Mexican English Airplay (Billboard)	46
US Active Rock (America's Music Charts)	7
US Rock Airplay (America's Music Charts)	17
US Hot Rock & Alternative Songs (Billboard)	27
US Hot Single Sales (Billboard)	3
US Mainstream Rock (Billboard)	8
US Rock Digital Songs (Billboard)	31

=== Year-end charts ===
Chart (2015)	Position
US Mainstream Rock Songs (Billboard)	35

== Release history ==
Region	Date	Format	Label	Ref.
Worldwide	December 16, 2014	Digital download	Cooking Vinyl	
United States	December 23, 2014	CD	Loma Vista	
United States	January 2015	Active rock radio	Loma Vista	

== In popular culture ==
- The song was used in the video game WWE 2K16.
