= The Mephistopheles of Los Angeles =

- French edition

Promotional single by Marilyn Manson

from the album The Pale Emperor
- Released: May 11, 2015
- Recorded: 2014; Los Angeles, California (Abattoir Studios; Igloo Studios)
- Genre: Blues metal; glam rock; post-punk
- Length: 4:57 (album version); 3:13 (radio edit)
- Label: Hell, etc.; Loma Vista
- Songwriters: Marilyn Manson; Tyler Bates
- Producers: Manson; Bates

"The Mephistopheles of Los Angeles" is a song by American rock band Marilyn Manson. It was released as the first promotional single from the band's ninth studio album, The Pale Emperor (2015).

== Composition and style ==
"The Mephistopheles of Los Angeles"
A 30 second sample of "The Mephistopheles of Los Angeles", as it appeared on The Pale Emperor

"The Mephistopheles of Los Angeles" is a midtempo blues-inspired rock song, which runs for a duration of four minutes and 57 seconds. Lyrically, the song finds Manson comparing himself with Mephistopheles, a Germanic mythical demon who collects the souls of the damned. The figure gained wider popularity as a character in the Faust legend. "The Mephistopheles of Los Angeles" was the original title track of The Pale Emperor and, according to Manson, "the album's heart". According to Ultimate Guitar, the song is written in common time with a moderately fast tempo of 125 beats per minute. The track follows a basic chord sequence of Am–Cmaj_{7}–F–C–G–Em_{7}–Am–Cm in the verse, while each chorus is composed of four repetitions of an Am–Cmaj_{7}–F–G sequence.

== Music video ==
Directed by Francesco Carrozzini and featuring a cameo from The Wire and Boardwalk Empire actor Michael K. Williams – who began uploading images from the video shoot to their social media accounts in late March – the official music video for the song was released on May 11, 2015 on the band's official YouTube channel.

=== Synopsis ===
The black-and-white video begins with Michael K. Williams emerging from a shadowy alleyway. Acting as a Faustian narrator, he presses his head between two steel bars and says "The first time I met him, I could feel the hounds of hell on my trail". Williams is dressed in attire similar to the kind worn by 1930s blues musician Robert Johnson – who, according to legend, entered into a Faustian pact with the Devil in exchange for his musical prowess. Williams' soliloquy goes on to describe his first encounter with Mephistopheles, the character played by Manson, before a title sequence appears.

Mephistopheles holding aloft his deceased victim.

As the song begins, it is interrupted by loud chants of "Hallelujah", and Mephistopheles is seen in a large open space surrounded by a group of followers made up of gang members and prostitutes. Mephistopheles begins reading and blessing his followers in an exaggerated fashion, reminiscent of the style employed by a televangelist. As several members of the group begin bowing and kissing Mephistopheles' hand, one of them begins screaming and contorts his body, symbolizing demonic possession. All members of the gang then embrace Mephistopheles, and follow him out of the open space.

In a subsequent scene, Mephistopheles is seen wandering down an alleyway, where he enters a room with a trinity of similar looking women. He eventually chooses one of the women by blessing them, and he begins baptizing her in a bathtub full of muddy water. When she loses consciousness, Mephistopheles revives her with the kiss of life, only to forcibly hold her under the water once again. After a prolonged, sinister gaze directly in to the camera, Mephistopheles holds the now-thrashing woman underwater until she appears lifeless. The video ends with Mephistopheles holding her drowned body in the air.

== Track listing ==
French Promo CD

1. "The Mephistopheles of Los Angeles" (Radio Edit) - 3:13
2. "Fated, Faithful, Fatal" (Radio Edit) - 3:09

UK Promo CD

1. "The Mephistopheles of Los Angeles" (Radio Edit) - 3:13
2. "The Mephistopheles Of Los Angeles" (Album Version) - 3:09

== Versions ==
- "The Mephistopheles of Los Angeles" — Appears on The Pale Emperor.
- "Fated, Faithful, Fatal" — Acoustic version, appears on deluxe editions of The Pale Emperor.

== Charts ==
Chart (2015)	Peak position
German Alternative Singles (Deutsche Alternative Charts)	3
