= Third Day of a Seven Day Binge =

Single by Marilyn Manson

from the album The Pale Emperor
- Released: October 26, 2014
- Recorded: 2014
- Studio: Abattoir (Los Angeles, CA); Igloo (Los Angeles, CA)
- Genre: Post-punk; glam rock
- Length: 4:26
- Label: Hell, etc.; Cooking Vinyl; Loma Vista
- Songwriters: Marilyn Manson; Tyler Bates
- Producers: Marilyn Manson; Tyler Bates

Marilyn Manson singles chronology
"Slo-Mo-Tion" (2012)	"Third Day of a Seven Day Binge" (2014)	"Deep Six" (2014)

"Third Day of a Seven Day Binge" is a song by American rock band Marilyn Manson. It was released as the first single from their ninth studio album, The Pale Emperor (2015).

== Release and promotion ==
The song was premiered on BBC Radio 1's Rock Show by Daniel P. Carter on October 26, 2014. Immediately following the broadcast, the song was released for free download on the band's official website, where it was available until November 9. The song was then released as a one-track digital single via music download services on November 10, as the first official single from the album. A limited edition CD was released exclusively at Best Buy stores in the US on December 23, containing both "Third Day of a Seven Day Binge" and the album's other single, "Deep Six", as double A-sides. A limited amount of these CDs came bundled with an exclusive T-Shirt. A 10" vinyl single – containing the acoustic version of the song, "Day 3", on the b-side – was available with pre-orders of the vinyl edition of the album at participating independent record stores.

Manson performed the song with The Smashing Pumpkins at London's KOKO on December 5, 2014. "The real treat comes in the encore," wrote Classic Rock, "when Marilyn Manson saunters onto the stage to perform his new single… before duetting with Corgan on 'Ava Adore' to close the show."

== Music video ==
In an interview with News.com.au on January 22, 2015, Manson confirmed that he completed a music video for the song in early January, but that its release was delayed because he was unhappy with the editing. He also confirmed that he filmed videos for a further two songs from the album. The video for "Third Day of a Seven Day Binge" was released on to the band's YouTube account on July 9, 2015.

== Track listing and formats ==
Digital single

1. "Third Day of a Seven Day Binge" - 4:26

Best Buy-exclusive CD single

1. "Third Day of a Seven Day Binge" - 4:26
2. "Deep Six" - 5:02

10" vinyl single

1. "Third Day of a Seven Day Binge" - 4:26
2. "Day 3" - 4:11

== Credits and personnel ==
Credits

- Recorded at Abattoir Studios, Studio City, California
- Drums recorded by Gustavo Borner at Igloo Studios, Burbank, California
- Songs of Golgotha (BMI)/Tyler Bates Music, Inc. (BMI), under exclusive license to Cooking Vinyl and Loma Vista Recordings

Personnel

- Marilyn Manson – songwriter, lead vocals, producer
- Tyler Bates – songwriter, electric guitar, bass guitar, keyboards, programming, producer
- Gil Sharone – drums
- Robert Carranza – mixing
- Dylan Eiland – additional programming
- Joanne Higginbottom – Pro Tools editing
- Brian Lucey – mastering
- Wolfgang Matthes – additional programming, mixing

Credits adapted from the liner notes of The Pale Emperor.

== Charts and certifications ==
In the US, "Third Day of a Seven Day Binge" was released as a double A-side with concurrent single "Deep Six".

Chart (2015)	Peak position
Czech Rock Singles (ČNS IFPI)	4
German Alternative Singles (Deutsche Alternative Charts)	3
US Hot Singles Sales (Billboard)	3

=== Certifications ===
Region	Certification	Certified units/sales
New Zealand (RMNZ)	Gold	15,000^{‡}
^{‡} Sales+streaming figures based on certification alone.

== Release history ==
Region	Date	Format	Label	Ref.
Worldwide	October 26, 2014	Airplay	—N/a	
Worldwide	October 26, 2014	Free download	—N/a	
Worldwide	November 10, 2015	Digital download	Cooking Vinyl	
United States	December 23, 2014	CD	Loma Vista Recordings	
United States	January 6, 2015	10" vinyl	Loma Vista Recordings	
