= The Pale Emperor =

Studio album by Marilyn Manson
- Released: January 15, 2015
- Recorded: May 2013 – September 2014
- Studios: Abattoir Studios and Igloo Studios; (Los Angeles, California)
- Genres: Alternative rock; blues rock; hard rock
- Length: 52:00
- Label: Hell, etc.
- Producers: Marilyn Manson; Tyler Bates

Marilyn Manson chronology
Born Villain (2012)	The Pale Emperor (2015)	Heaven Upside Down (2017)

Singles from The Pale Emperor
- 1. "Third Day of a Seven Day Binge" Released: October 26, 2014; 2. "Deep Six" Released: December 16, 2014; 3. "Cupid Carries a Gun" Released: January 7, 2015

The Pale Emperor is the ninth studio album by American rock band Marilyn Manson. It was released on January 15, 2015, through lead singer Marilyn Manson's Hell, etc. label, and distributed in the United States by Loma Vista Recordings and internationally by Cooking Vinyl. The album was issued in standard and deluxe editions on CD and double LP vinyl, and as a limited edition box set. The standard version of the album contains ten tracks; the deluxe edition includes three acoustic versions as bonus tracks.

Produced by Manson and newcomer Tyler Bates, who Manson met through their mutual involvement in the TV series Californication, The Pale Emperor eschews the band's usual industrial rock style in favor of a sparser, blues rock-influenced sound. The album features drummer Gil Sharone, formerly of Stolen Babies and The Dillinger Escape Plan. It was the first album since his return to the band in 2008 to not include songwriting or performance contributions from bassist Twiggy Ramirez, who was busy with his own projects. The album is dedicated to Manson's mother, who died of Alzheimer's disease during production.

The album was released to positive reviews from music critics. Several writers referred to it as the band's best album in over a decade, and multiple publications ranked it as one of the best albums of 2015. It was also a commercial success, debuting at number eight on the Billboard 200 with the band's highest opening week sales since Eat Me, Drink Me (2007). It topped Billboard's Hard Rock Albums chart, as well as the national albums chart in Switzerland, and peaked within the top ten in fifteen other countries.

Three official singles were released, "Third Day of a Seven Day Binge", "Cupid Carries a Gun" and "Deep Six"; the latter became the band's highest-peaking single on Billboard's Mainstream Rock Chart; "The Mephistopheles of Los Angeles" and "The Devil Beneath My Feet" have been released as promotional singles. The album was supported by The Hell Not Hallelujah Tour, which was interspersed with two co-headlining tours: The End Times with The Smashing Pumpkins, and a summer 2016 tour with Slipknot.

== Background and recording ==
Marilyn Manson was one of the most controversial metal bands of the late 1990s. In 1999, news media scapegoated the band for influencing the perpetrators of the Columbine High School massacre, which the vocalist has claimed "totally shoved [my career] in the dirt". Subsequent albums were criticized by both critics and fans alike, and the band was dropped by its long-time record label Interscope in 2009. A year later, they signed a joint-venture deal with London-based independent record label Cooking Vinyl. Born Villain was released in 2012, and was heralded as a return to form.

In August 2012, it was announced that Manson would play a fictionalized version of himself in a four-episode arc of the sixth season of TV series Californication. While filming its season finale, Manson met the series' score composer, Tyler Bates, and the two discussed a potential collaboration. In May 2013, Manson confirmed that production had started on new material. They held their first writing session in a small rehearsal space, accompanied by former Slayer drummer Dave Lombardo. This session proved unsuccessful, and the pair failed to write any substantial material. Bates later suggested that they hold further writing sessions at his home studio, which resulted in their composition of "Birds of Hell Awaiting" in "one spontaneous exchange".

"Tyler sat in front of me with his guitar and his amp. We wouldn't talk about what the songs were going to be. I'd say, 'Just play, give me the mic, go.' Of course we'd elaborate on it later, but for the most part, the guitar and the vocal takes are the original, first take. If I fucked something up or if he fucked something up, we'd start from the beginning and do it together."

— Manson on the recording process of The Pale Emperor.

This was quickly followed by "Third Day of a Seven Day Binge". Manson said that the recording of the album "just became a rhythm. This was something I was excited to do." This is in stark contrast to the recording of The High End of Low (2009) and Born Villain, when he was frequently "dragged into the studio" late at night to record vocals. He credited this enthusiasm to the collaborative process between him and Bates, saying that he realized after the first performance of "Birds of Hell Awaiting" that "[I] just sang it. I didn't even know where the music was going to go and I just went with it and it was very organic. And then it opened up a whole different part of my mind."

Bates called the recording process "seamless" because of the unconventional studio environment. Manson, isolated in a vocal booth with no more than three people in the control room at any one time, was free to improvise or develop new lyrics and vocal melodies at a high speed. By using Pro Tools, Bates was able to "manipulate the music in a way that would allow [Manson] to just keep working on it without causing [a delay]. If he had an idea, he could just throw it down without there being a lot to explain." The majority of the album was recorded during a three-month period. The band's manager, Tony Ciulla, only became aware that Manson had been recording new material when he was invited to Bates' home recording studio, where Bates played final cuts of nine of the album's ten tracks; "Cupid Carries a Gun" was the only track not yet completed. With the base tracks recorded, overdubbing took place over the following six months between Manson's acting commitments on Sons of Anarchy and Bates scoring the 2014 television series Salem.

Gil Sharone, of The Dillinger Escape Plan and Stolen Babies, performed live drums on the album. Sharone was first contacted by Bates about the project in January 2014, three days before he was due to begin a tour with Stolen Babies. He developed and recorded his drum work over two days at Igloo Studios in Burbank, California. Long-time bassist – and Manson's chief collaborator – Twiggy did not take part in the writing and recording process, as he was busy recording his own material. It was the first release since his return to the band in 2008 to not feature Twiggy's involvement. His collaborator on the Goon Moon project, Fred Sablan, departed Marilyn Manson on good terms. Manson's Sons of Anarchy co-star Walton Goggins appears as a preacher on album track "Slave Only Dreams to Be King", reciting two verses from James Allen's early 20th-century essay As a Man Thinketh. Manson announced that the band's new album was "prepared for landing" in early September. He dedicated the record to his mother, Barbara Warner, who died on May 13, 2014, eight years after being diagnosed with Alzheimer's disease.

== Composition and style ==
Major influences on The Pale Emperor

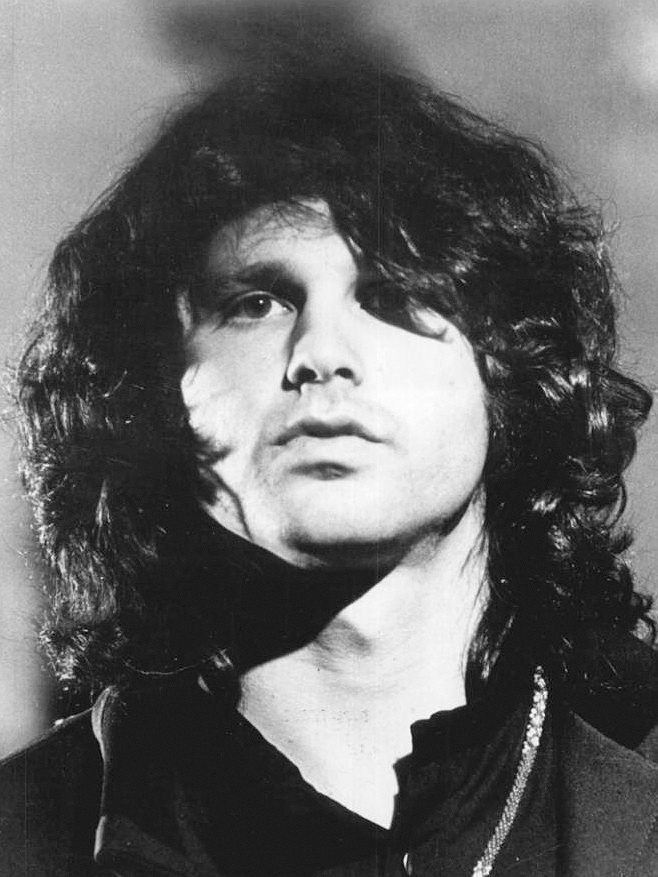
Jim Morrison, frontman of The Doors, influenced the album's vocals and lyrics.

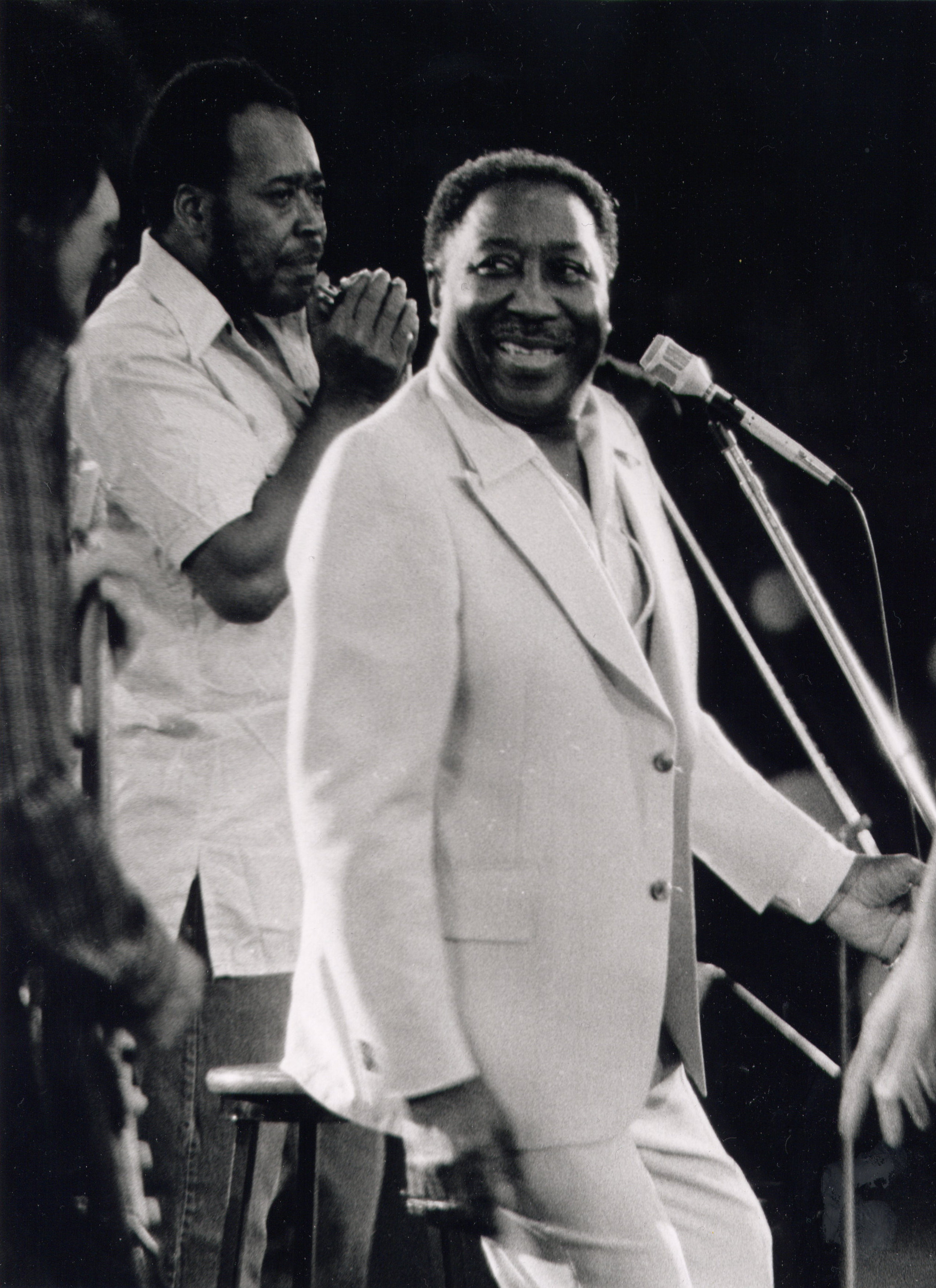
The blues genre, particularly the music of Muddy Waters, inspired the album's style.

In a January 2014 interview with Kerrang! magazine, Manson described the sound of the album as being "very cinematic", saying that the "redneck in me comes out in my voice" owing to the album's inclusion of blues influences, while still retaining the harder elements of previous work. The album has been compared to the music which was used to soundtrack Sons of Anarchy. Manson called himself "a man of few words" [on the record], opting to allow melody to be its primary focus, instead of using characters or extended metaphors to compose lyrics. Lyrics for the album were all derived from a single notebook, with Manson admitting that the content of previous work was too scattered, as they were composed of material taken from up to 20 different notebooks. He has described it as being intentionally sparse lyrically, elaborating that blues music stems from the "guttural, visceral element of music. I [left] holes in these stories so it becomes your story, it becomes more cinematic. For example in the film Rosemary's Baby, you don't see the baby but in your mind you do."

The Pale Emperor is a departure from the band's usual style, leaning away from the industrial production that appeared on much of their previous work and incorporating a sparser sound, which has been described as blues rock, alternative rock, hard rock, and alternative country. Manson cited the music of Muddy Waters, The Rolling Stones, and The Doors as inspirations. Steven Hyden of Grantland identified several parallels between The Pale Emperor and the Doors' 1971 album L.A. Woman, suggesting that in the two albums both bands were re-energized in the latter part of their career. He also compared Manson's vocal style to that of Jim Morrison, and claimed the album's lyrics echo Morrison's "self-destructive self-aggrandizement".

"The Mephistopheles of Los Angeles"
"The Mephistopheles of Los Angeles" was the "album's heart", and its original title track. This audio sample contains a portion of the song's second chorus.

The album's title is a reference to Constantius I – or Constantius the Pale – who was the first Roman emperor to deny the existence of a God. The album was inspired by an Antonin Artaud book given to Manson by actor Johnny Depp about the life of the decadent emperor Heliogabalus. Manson has said its meaning can have several interpretations: "complexion or Goth music or 'beyond the pale' or [...] everything 'pales in comparison' to it". Lyrically, the album deals with mortality, war, violence, slavery and religion, and includes references to Greek mythology and German folklore, specifically the story of Faust and Mephistopheles. "The Mephistopheles of Los Angeles" was the original title track and, according to Manson, the album's heart. The Pale Emperor makes use of an extended metaphor, in which Manson compares his own career to the life of Faust. He told The Philadelphia Inquirer that he "sold [his] soul to become a rock star, and this payment in full—with interest, considering the last few bills I didn't pay," explaining that he considered The High End of Low and Born Villain lacking in focus. He elaborated to Classic Rock magazine:

If we stick to the Faust story – if I had been in that story – and I had sold my soul [to the devil] for fame and fortune, and had the arrogance of [Faust] to not want to pay back the deal, it's taken a few years for me to acknowledge to myself that I was hearing: 'Manson [rapping his knuckles on the table], the hell hounds are on your trail.' And this record is my payment. This is me giving back what I was given, or took. [...] If you believe in some mythology, and you want to live by those rules, then I had to say myself: 'I'm not really doing what I set out to do,' even though I tried to convince myself that I was. I'm not regretting the last few records that I've made, but since Holy Wood (In the Shadow of the Valley of Death), I've not made something with [that] sheer utter fearlessness and anger and force.

Throughout the album, Manson sings in a different key than on any of the band's previous releases. He has claimed that his voice can emit five different tones simultaneously, and that mixing engineer Robert Carranza showed him that a recording of his vocals formed a visual pentagram when imported into a phrasal analyzer. Bates has said that the vocals on the album are stripped down in comparison to previous records, which he considered to be overproduced.

== Release and artwork ==
The band announced the album's title and release date on its official website on November 9, 2014. Its global release schedule started on January 15, 2015. Formats included standard and deluxe edition CDs; a heavyweight 180-gram double LP vinyl album, available in black, white and a grey marble-effect limited edition, the latter of which was exclusive to Hot Topic; and as a digital download, including 24-bit AIFF and WAV format files, which were released exclusively on Qobuz. The LP discs were manufactured at Record Technology, Inc. in Camarillo, California, on high-quality vinyl. A digital download of the album was packaged with all LP editions.

The standard version of the album contains ten tracks and the deluxe edition adds three acoustic versions as bonus tracks. Editions of the album sold at Walmart stores in North America feature a censored version of "The Devil Beneath My Feet". Manson later criticized the store and its gun sales policy, categorizing Walmart in an Australian interview as "that store in America which sells guns to kids but won't sell R-rated lyrics." Manson went on to joke that he might "do a signing at a Walmart store where I just sign guns, and you get a free record with it when you buy a gun." American CD versions of the album were packaged with black polycarbonate discs identical to those used by Sony for the original PlayStation in the early 1990s; the discs were sourced by Brian Schuman of Concord Music from the same plant Sony used. A heat-sensitive thermal texture was added to the CD, so that it appeared black when first opened but revealed a white pattern when exposed to the heat of a CD player.

The album was also released as a limited edition "Definitive Box" set, which was sold exclusively on the bands webstore. Designed by Manson with Willo Perron and Hassan Rahim, the set included the deluxe CD and white vinyl editions of the album and several exclusive items, including a grey cloth-bound individually numbered collectors box, five lithographs designed by artist Nicholas Cope, a fold-out 24-inch poster, album sleeves printed on full-color UV-coated stock and a Pale Emperor T-shirt. A special edition containing a bonus DVD of music videos was later released in Japan.

== Promotion and singles ==
Music from the album was previewed almost nine months before its official release, when "Cupid Carries a Gun" appeared as the opening theme to the television series Salem from April 27, 2014 onward. A large portion of the album track "Killing Strangers" was featured in the film John Wick, which was released in cinemas on October 24. Two days later, "Third Day of a Seven Day Binge" was premiered on BBC Radio 1's Rock Show by Daniel P. Carter. Immediately after the broadcast, the song was released for free download on the band's official website, and then released as a one-track single via music download services on November 10. The band, which consisted of Bates and Paul Wiley on guitars, Twiggy on bass and Sharone on drums, performed several new songs live for the first time in October and early November, when they played a handful of concerts in southern California. On Halloween night, they were joined onstage by actor Johnny Depp and Ninja from Die Antwoord for a performance of Manson's 1996 single "The Beautiful People" at the Roxy Theatre. On December 5, Manson settled a fifteen-year rift with The Smashing Pumpkins frontman Billy Corgan, joining the Pumpkins at their show at the Camden Palace Theatre in London to perform "Third Day of a Seven Day Binge" and Pumpkins song "Ava Adore".

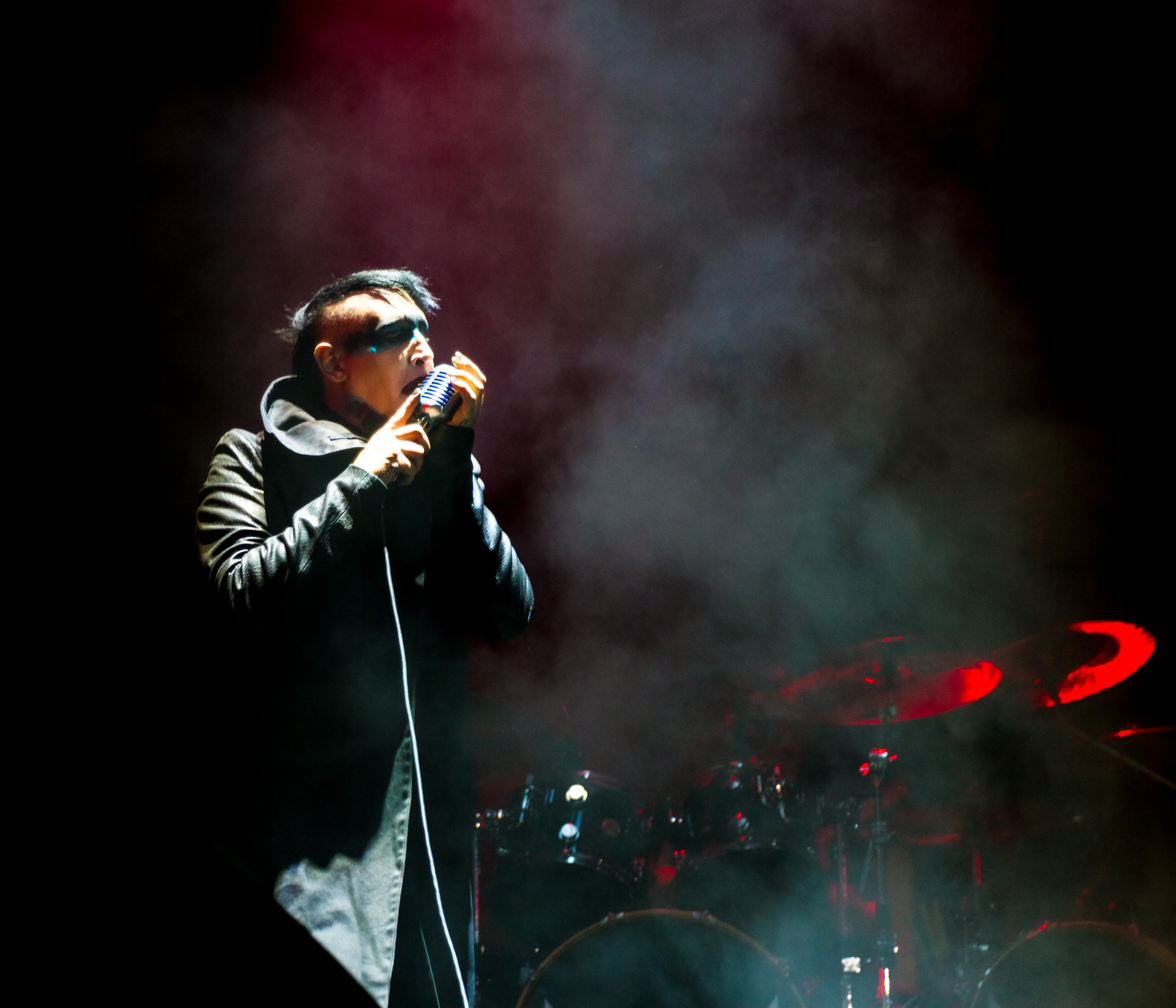
Manson performing at Rock am Ring 2015

"Deep Six" was released as the album's official lead single on December 16. A music video for the song, directed by Bart Hess, was released on YouTube three days later. The song debuted at number 33 on Billboard's Mainstream Rock Chart on the issue dated December 23, 2014, as the "greatest gainer" that week, before rising to number eight on the chart dated March 14, 2015, becoming the band's highest-peaking single on the chart. In response to the album leaking online, it was made available to stream on the site Genius on January 12, eight days ahead of its official US release. "Cupid Carries a Gun" was released as a digital single on January 7, 2015. The band began The Hell Not Hallelujah Tour on January 21, 2015. They performed at several music festivals throughout the year, including Soundwave in Australia, Rock am Ring and Rock im Park in Germany, the Download Festival in the UK and Hellfest in France.

Manson and his father, Hugh Warner, appeared together in the February issue of Paper magazine. The shoot, by photographer Terry Richardson, featured the pair wearing identical make-up and contained an explicit image in which Hugh is shown fondling his own genitalia. On April 12, Bates announced that he had retired from the band's touring line-up under amicable circumstances. Bates said he had prepared the band to function without him, anticipating a departure once obligations in the film and TV industry made his schedule too difficult for touring. Rhythm guitarist Paul Wiley replaced Bates on lead guitar for the duration of the tour. A music video for "The Mephistopheles of Los Angeles", directed by Francesco Carrozzini and featuring a cameo from actor Michael K. Williams, was released on May 11. On June 11, Manson was honored with a Lifetime Achievement Award at the 2015 Kerrang! Awards. Later that month, he appeared as the keynote speaker at the 2015 Cannes Lions International Festival of Creativity.

The End Times, a 23-date co-headlining tour of North America with The Smashing Pumpkins, began in Concord, California on July 7. On July 10, the band released a music video for "Third Day of a Seven Day Binge". In February 2016, Manson contributed vocals to a version of David Bowie's "Cat People (Putting Out Fire)" on Countach (For Giorgio), a tribute album to Giorgio Moroder curated by Shooter Jennings. A 16-bit music video for the song was released in August. The band also announced details of another co-headlining tour, this time with heavy metal band Slipknot. This tour was scheduled to begin on June 9 in Salt Lake City and consist of 34 dates in Amphitheatres throughout North America, with Of Mice & Men supporting. The first twelve dates of the tour were postponed after a physical examination revealed that Corey Taylor had broken two vertebrae in his neck. The tour began on June 28 in Nashville, Tennessee, with the postponed shows rescheduled for August.

== Critical reception ==
Professional ratings
Aggregate scores
Source	Rating
Metacritic	71/100
Review scores
Source	Rating
AllMusic	4/5 stars
The A.V. Club	B
Consequence of Sound	C
Drowned in Sound	8/10
Kerrang!	4/5 Ks
Metal Hammer	3.5/5 stars
NME	6/10
Revolver	5/5 stars
Rolling Stone	3.5/5 stars
Slant Magazine	3/5 stars

The Pale Emperor received generally positive reviews from music critics. At Metacritic, which assigns a weighted mean rating out of 100 to reviews from music critics, the album received an average score of 71, indicating generally favorable reviews, based on 19 publications.

Numerous publications referred to it as being the band's best album in over 15 years. Alec Chillingworth of Stereoboard suggested that it saw Manson "climbing back to the creative summit he fell from following Holy Wood." He praised the record for its musical diversity, saying that "by expanding his palette and finally getting it right, it reinstates Marilyn Manson as a relevant musical force, and an elder statesman of the industrial scene." He awarded the album four out of five stars. Several other writers compared it to Mechanical Animals (1998). A writer for Sonic Abuse said it was grander in scope than any of their albums since the late 90s, and ranked it among the best releases of the band's discography.

The record was lauded for its combination of differing genres, and its concision. J.C. Maçek III of PopMatters praised the scope of musical variety found on the album, with particular acclaim given for its incorporation of alternative country elements. Fred Thomas of AllMusic noted its inclusion of blues influences, and said that this shift in musical direction resulted in the album sounding more sinister than any of the band's previous work. The record was featured in Loudwire as their editors' pick for the month of January 2015, where it was called a "satisfying listening experience from top to bottom". A reviewer for Music Feeds compared The Pale Emperor to Antichrist Superstar (1996), commenting that both albums work best when listened to as a whole. Drowned in Sound critic Dave Hanratty praised Bates' production and the album's consistency, writing "damned if the devil didn't bring his best tunes to this dance."

Critics also praised the quality and maturity of the band's songwriting. Corey Deiterman of the Houston Press called The Pale Emperor a "triumphant return to the songwriting principles that made him famous in the first place." In a positive review for Yahoo! Music, Allan Raible highlighted the album's focus on songcraft instead of shock value. Similarly, Kerrang! said that it "trades shock-tastic thrills for something even darker", calling it "brave, smart and intriguing." Dean Brown of The Quietus said Manson was a revitalized performer, and praised the record for its addictive hooks. Jeff Miers of The Buffalo News, who regarded The Pale Emperor as the band's first excellent post-millennial collection of music, praised its lyrical content, saying that Manson sounds "both inspired and disgusted [throughout], which is usually the tightrope he walks when he's doing his best work." A review for Revolver dubbed it an album of the year contender, and it topped the publication's weekly readers poll.

The album received some mixed reviews, however. Louis Pattison, reviewing for NME, said that the album would not be considered a classic, but complimented the material for a reduced emphasis on shock value. A reviewer for Consequence of Sound wrote that "A lack of 'oomph' prevents the album from landing a gut punch that would cover all of its flaws. Like an aging boxer, Manson lands jabs and the occasional uppercut, but he never topples his opponent." Neil McCormick of The Daily Telegraph compared the record to the early work of English gothic rock band Bauhaus, and said that while it was "undeniably effective [...] in small bursts," he found the whole "wearingly abrasive". Daniel Sylvester of Exclaim!, although he admired the ambition of the album, complained it was "lazy when it can get away with it".

=== Year-end lists ===
Critic/Publication	Accolade	Rank	Ref.
About.com	The Best Rock Albums of 2015	1	
AllMusic	Favorite Metal Albums	—	
Alternative Nation	Top 10 Rock Albums of 2015	2	
Antiquiet	2015's Best Albums	2	
Classic Rock	50 Best Albums of 2015	43	
Drowned in Sound	Albums of the Year: 2015	33	
Gaffa	Foreign Albums of 2015	19	
Guitar World	50 Best Albums of 2015	39	
Kerrang!	Albums of the Year 2015	15	
Hannah Ewens from Kerrang!	Top 10 Albums of the Year	5	
Paul Travers from Kerrang!	Top 10 Albums of the Year	9	
Loudwire	20 Best Rock Albums of 2015 (Staff picks)	2	
Loudwire	Best Rock Album of 2015 (Reader vote)	6	
Metal Hammer	50 Best Albums of 2015	7	
Revolver	Top 20 Albums of 2015	11	
Rolling Stone	50 Best Albums of 2015	34	
Rolling Stone	20 Best Metal Albums of 2015	1	
State	State's Albums of 2015	47	
Lina Lecaro from Yahoo! Music	Best Albums of 2015	7	

=== Decade-end lists ===
Critic/Publication	Accolade	Rank	Ref.
Kerrang!	The 75 Best Albums of the 2010s	51	
Louder Sound	The 50 Best Metal Albums of the 2010s	31	

== Commercial performance ==
Industry forecasters predicted that The Pale Emperor was on course for a top ten debut on the Billboard 200, with estimated first-week sales of around 42,000 units. The album debuted at number eight on the chart with sales of over 51,000 album-equivalent units, of which 49,000 units were "pure" album sales—that is, traditional copies of the album, rather than units calculated as a measure of track sales or streaming. This was the band's highest opening-week figure since Eat Me, Drink Me debuted at the same position with 88,000 copies in 2007, and was their sixth consecutive top ten album. It also debuted at number six on Billboard's Top Albums Sales—the current equivalent of the Billboard 200 before it was reconfigured to accommodate track sales and streaming—as well as number three on Top Rock Albums and number one on the Top Hard Rock Albums charts. On its second week, the album dropped to number 24 on the Top Albums Chart, selling a further 12,275 "pure" copies. As of December 2015, The Pale Emperor has sold more than 136,000 "pure" copies in the US. The album debuted at number four on the Canadian Albums Chart, with sales of over 5,000 copies on its first week according to Nielsen SoundScan.

In Eurasia, the album debuted on the Russian Albums Chart at number ten on the chart dated January 18, 2015, based on three days of sale on the Russian iTunes store. The album rose to number two the following week, on its first full week of release in the country. It debuted at number one on the Swiss Albums Chart, making it the band's second number-one album there following The Golden Age of Grotesque (2003). In the United Kingdom, it debuted at number 16 with sales of 5,984 copies, and was their seventh consecutive album to peak within the top 20. The album peaked at number four on the German Albums Chart, and was their highest-charting album in the territory since Eat Me, Drink Me. The Pale Emperor became Manson's fifth top-ten album in France, where it debuted at number five with sales of over 6,700 copies. It has gone on to sell over 30,000 copies there. In Japan, the album debuted at number 25 on the Oricon Albums Chart, with sales of 3,610 copies. The album debuted at number six on the ARIA Albums Chart as the highest new entry that week. It was the band's fifth top-ten album in Australia, and their highest-peaking since The Golden Age of Grotesque. It debuted at number five in New Zealand, making it their first top five album in the country since Mechanical Animals peaked at number three in 1998.

== Track listing ==
All lyrics are written by Marilyn Manson; all music is composed by Tyler Bates.

No.	Title	Length
1.	"Killing Strangers"	5:36
2.	"Deep Six"	5:02
3.	"Third Day of a Seven Day Binge"	4:26
4.	"The Mephistopheles of Los Angeles"	4:57
5.	"Warship My Wreck"	5:57
6.	"Slave Only Dreams to Be King"	5:20
7.	"The Devil Beneath My Feet"	4:16
8.	"Birds of Hell Awaiting"	5:05
9.	"Cupid Carries a Gun"	4:59
10.	"Odds of Even" ( (Note: Deluxe edition adds 1:30 of silence to the track))	6:22
Total length:		52:00

Deluxe edition bonus tracks
No.	Title	Length
11.	"Day 3" (Acoustic version of "Third Day of a Seven Day Binge")	4:11
12.	"Fated, Faithful, Fatal" (Acoustic version of "The Mephistopheles of Los Angeles")	4:41
13.	"Fall of the House of Death" (Acoustic version of "Odds of Even")	4:30
Total length:		65:22

Japanese Tour edition bonus DVD
No.	Title	Directors	Length
1.	"Deep Six" (music video)	Bart Hess	4:10
2.	"The Mephistopheles of Los Angeles" (music video)	Francesco Carrozzini	5:03
Total length:			9:13

== Personnel ==
Credits adapted from the liner notes of the deluxe edition of The Pale Emperor.

- Recorded at Abattoir Studios, Studio City, California
- Drums recorded by Gustavo Borner at Igloo Studios, Burbank, California
- Mixed by Robert Carranza and Wolfgang Matthes at SPPP, Los Angeles, California
- Mastering by Brian Lucey at Magic Garden Mastering, Los Angeles, California

Marilyn Manson

- Marilyn Manson – vocals, percussion, pill bottle (track 1), keyboards (track 6),
- Tyler Bates – guitars, guitar violin, bass, keyboards, programming
- Gil Sharone – drums

Additional musicians

- Roger Joseph Manning, Jr. – piano (track 6)
- Frank Macchia – baritone and tenor saxophones (track 8)
- Walton Goggins, Jr. – preacher (track 6)

Technical

- Marilyn Manson – production
- Tyler Bates – production
- Emma Banks – executive booking agent
- Tony Ciulla – management
- Nicholas Cope – photography
- Chris Daltson – executive booking agent
- Dylan Eiland – additional programming
- Joanne Higginbottom – Pro Tools editing
- Wolfgang Matthes – additional programming
- Willo Perron – creative direction
- Hassan Rahim – art direction
- Rick Roskin – booking agent
- Laurie Soriano – legal

== Charts ==
=== Weekly charts ===
Chart (2015)	Peak position
Australian Albums (ARIA)	6
Austrian Albums (Ö3 Austria)	4
Belgian Albums (Ultratop Flanders)	20
Belgian Albums (Ultratop Wallonia)	5
Canadian Albums (Billboard)	4
Croatian Albums (HDU)	31
Czech Albums (ČNS IFPI)	7
Danish Albums (Hitlisten)	18
Dutch Albums (MegaCharts)	21
Finnish Albums (Suomen virallinen lista)	10
French Albums (SNÉP)	5
German Albums (Offizielle Top 100)	4
Greek Albums (IFPI)	8
Hungarian Albums (MAHASZ)	8
Irish Albums (IRMA)	21
Irish Independent Albums (IRMA)	5
Italian Albums (FIMI)	26
Japanese Albums (Oricon)	25
Mexican Albums (AMPROFON)	33
New Zealand Albums (RMNZ)	5
Norwegian Albums (VG-lista)	24
Polish Albums (ZPAV)	3
Portuguese Albums (AFP)	10
Russian Albums (2M)	2
Scottish Albums (OCC)	17
Spanish Albums (PROMUSICAE)	15
Swedish Albums (Sverigetopplistan)	20
Swiss Albums (Schweizer Hitparade)	1
UK Albums (OCC)	16
UK Independent Albums (OCC)	6
UK Rock & Metal Albums (OCC)	3
US Billboard 200	8
US Top Rock Albums (Billboard)	3
US Top Alternative Albums (Billboard)	3
US Top Hard Rock Albums (Billboard)	1

=== Year-end charts ===
Chart (2015)	Position
Australian Hard Rock Albums (ARIA)	11
Belgian Albums (Ultratop Wallonia)	154
French Albums (SNEP)	151
US Top Rock Albums (Billboard)	41
US Alternative Albums (Billboard)	27
US Top Hard Rock Albums (Billboard)	11

== Release history ==
Region	Date	Label	Distributor(s)	Format(s)	Catalog #
Belgium	January 15, 2015	Hell, etc.	Cooking Vinyl	standard CD; deluxe CD; 2× LP vinyl; digital download; definitive box set	COOKCD/LP602[X]
Germany	January 16, 2015	Hell, etc.	Cooking Vinyl	standard CD; deluxe CD; 2× LP vinyl; digital download; definitive box set	COOKCD/LP602[X]
Ireland	January 16, 2015	Hell, etc.	Cooking Vinyl	standard CD; deluxe CD; 2× LP vinyl; digital download; definitive box set	COOKCD/LP602[X]
Italy	January 16, 2015	Hell, etc.	Cooking Vinyl	standard CD; deluxe CD; 2× LP vinyl; digital download; definitive box set	COOKCD/LP602[X]
France	January 19, 2015	Hell, etc.	Cooking Vinyl	standard CD; deluxe CD; 2× LP vinyl; digital download; definitive box set	COOKCD/LP602[X]
Netherlands	January 19, 2015	Hell, etc.	Cooking Vinyl	standard CD; deluxe CD; 2× LP vinyl; digital download; definitive box set	COOKCD/LP602[X]
Sweden	January 19, 2015	Hell, etc.	Cooking Vinyl	standard CD; deluxe CD; 2× LP vinyl; digital download; definitive box set	COOKCD/LP602[X]
Norway	January 19, 2015	Hell, etc.	Cooking Vinyl	standard CD; deluxe CD; 2× LP vinyl; digital download; definitive box set	COOKCD/LP602[X]
United Kingdom	January 19, 2015	Hell, etc.	Cooking Vinyl	standard CD; deluxe CD; 2× LP vinyl; digital download; definitive box set	COOKCD/LP602[X]
Canada	January 20, 2015	Hell, etc.	Dine Alone Records	standard CD; deluxe CD; 2× LP vinyl; digital download; definitive box set	DA130
United States	January 20, 2015	Hell, etc.	Loma Vista	standard CD; deluxe CD; 2× LP vinyl; digital download; definitive box set	LVR-36380-02
Japan	January 21, 2015	Hell, etc.	Victor Entertainment	standard CD; deluxe CD; 2× LP vinyl; digital download; definitive box set	VICP-65261
Australia	January 23, 2015	Hell, etc.	Cooking Vinyl	standard CD; deluxe CD; 2× LP vinyl; digital download; definitive box set	COOKCD/LP602[X]
New Zealand	January 23, 2015	Hell, etc.	Cooking Vinyl	standard CD; deluxe CD; 2× LP vinyl; digital download; definitive box set	COOKCD/LP602[X]
Japan	July 29, 2015	Hell, etc.	Victor Entertainment	CD + DVD bundle	VIZP-138

== See also ==
- List of number-one albums of 2015 (Switzerland)
