= Robert Carranza =

American record producer

- Origin: Los Angeles, California, United States
- Occupations: Record producer, Engineer
- Years active: 1990–Present

Robert Carranza is an American audio engineer, mixer and record producer. Carranza was nominated in 2003 and 2005 for a Latin grammy award, which he won in 2005. In 2008, he was elected for the best non-classical engineered album.

== Selected discography ==
- 2026 – Lucro Sucio; Unfinished Business – The Mars Volta
- 2024 – One Assassination Under God - Chapter 1 – Marilyn Manson
- 2017 – Heaven Upside Down – Marilyn Manson
- 2016 – Dont Go She Gone – Mangchi
- 2015 – The Pale Emperor – Marilyn Manson
- 2014 – Convoque Seu Buda – Criolo
- 2010 – Keyboard City – Salvador Santana
- 2009 – Zee Avi – Zee Avi
- 2009 – Jack Johnson En Concert – Jack Johnson
- 2009 – Arte De La Elegancia De – LFC Los Fabulosos Cadillacs
- 2009 – 1 Up! – IllScarlett
- 2008 – SSB – Salvador Santana Band
- 2008 – Sleep Through the Static – Jack Johnson
- 2008 – Sirenas – División Minúscula
- 2008 – One Day as a Lion – One Day as a Lion
- 2008 – Maestro – Taj Mahal
- 2008 – Luz del Ritmo – Los Fabulosos Cadillacs
- 2008 – In the Ever – Mason Jennings
- 2008 – The Secret War – Shadow Jaguar
- 2008 – The Bedlam in Goliath – The Mars Volta
- 2008 – 10,000 Steps – Biomusique
- 2007 – Se Dice Bisonte, No Bùfalo – Omar Rodriguez-Lopez Group
- 2007 – Roses & Clover – Animal Liberation Orchestra
- 2007 – Eternamiente – Molotov
- 2007 – Don't Mess with the Dragon – Ozomatli

== Film credits ==
- Sucker Punch
- Super
- 300
- The Devil's Rejects
- Slither
- Dawn of the Dead
- What's the Worst That Could Happen?
- Rated X
- Trouble Bound
- The Last Time I Committed Suicide
- Fall Time
- Baadasssss!
- Kingdom Come
- Born Bad
- Denial
- Alien Avengers
- The Crow: City of Angels
