= Hell, etc. (label) =

American record label

- Parent company: Cooking Vinyl
- Founded: 2010; 15 years ago
- Founder: Marilyn Manson
- Genre: Rock; industrial metal; industrial rock; alternative metal
- Country of origin: United States

Hell, etc. is an American record label founded by Marilyn Manson in 2010. It is a vanity label operating under the larger parent publisher Cooking Vinyl. Hell, etc. is the second vanity label Manson has operated, the first being Posthuman Records, which functioned within Priority Records between 2000 and 2002.

== Background ==
Hell, etc. was founded by Marilyn Manson, frontman of the eponymous band. Prior to the founding of the label, Marilyn Manson was signed to long-time record label Interscope Records, whom under which the band had been with the label's subsidiary Nothing Records since their debut album Portrait of an American Family, and released two further albums under Interscope following Nothing's dissolution in 2004.

Following the release of The High End of Low, Marilyn Manson's last release under Interscope, he was reportedly dropped by Interscope, however this is disputed by Manson who claims that he was released from his long-term contract with the record company, and left because the label was too constrictive.

Manson began indicating a new album would be released "a lot sooner" not long after his association with Interscope ended. The formation of Hell, etc. was announced on November 7, 2010 as part of a joint venture with Cooking Vinyl Records, which will handle the worldwide distribution, marketing and promotion of Marilyn Manson's future releases. Manson explained, "We will always be our worst audience, until we stop being an audience and start being an artist. Any art is flesh and blood, no matter how you perform, decorate or display it. But we all want the passionate horror of that blood. And blood is what I am here to bring." Marilyn Manson manager Tony Ciulla told ABC News, "The 50-50 joint venture is a 'more attractive financial arrangement and allows for greater (creative) control,' with both parties sharing profits after Cooking Vinyl recoups its costs, which include an advance paid out to Manson and a 'big marketing commitment.'"

Cooking Vinyl founder Martin Goldschmidt has projected an initial global sales target of 500,000 units. "We're delighted to welcome MARILYN MANSON to Cooking Vinyl," said Goldschmidt. "Often our 'relaxed' approach to A&R brings out killer performances and albums from artists. I can't wait to hear what Manson comes up with. This is a landmark signing for us. We shook up folk music in the late '80s/'90s with MICHELLE SHOCKED, COWBOY JUNKIES and BILLY BRAGG, we have shaken up dance in the last couple of years with THE PRODIGY, GROOVE ARMADA and UNDERWORLD, and we are ready for a new adventure with Mr. Manson."

The first release made under Hell, etc. was Marilyn Manson's eighth studio album, Born Villain, which was released worldwide on May 1, 2012. The Pale Emperor, Manson's ninth studio album, was released on January 20, 2015.

== Artists ==
- Marilyn Manson

== See also ==
- List of record labels
