= Hey Cruel World... Tour =

2012–13 tour by Marilyn Manson

Hey Cruel World...Tour
- Tour by Marilyn Manson
- Promotional poster for the Hey Cruel World... Tour
- Location: North America, South America, Europe, Asia, Oceania
- Associated album: Born Villain
- Start date: February 24, 2012
- End date: July 21, 2013
- Legs: 13
- No. of shows: 163 (4 canceled); 36 (w/ Rob Zombie); 19 (w/ Alice Cooper); 106 in North America; 41 in Europe; 8 in Oceania; 3 in South America; 5 in Asia

Marilyn Manson concert chronology
- The High End of Low Tour (2009); Hey Cruel World... Tour (2012–13) Twins of Evil Tour (2012) Masters of Madness Tour (2013); The Hell Not Hallelujah Tour (2013)

The Hey Cruel World...Tour, by American rock band Marilyn Manson, supported their eighth full-length studio LP, 2012's Born Villain. The band's thirteenth tour was their ninth to spread over multiple legs, spanning North America, South America, Europe, Asia and Oceania. The tour was named after the opening song of the album.

Rumors about the tour's itinerary began as early as June 3, 2011, when the Brazilian edition of Portuguese broadsheet newspaper Destak published that agents for the band had finalized negotiations for the group to tour Brazil and other South American countries as part of the SWU Music & Arts Festival in November 2011. Despite this, the band's supposed inclusion in the roster failed to materialize.

The tour's 2012 itinerary was confirmed in October 2011 to include an Australian leg from late February to early March as part of the 5-day 2012 Soundwave music festival. After the Australian leg the tour continued to Asia, North America and Europe, including Manson's first performances in the United States since mid-2009.

"We had to get our fuck on…" Manson told Kerrang! when the tour hit the UK. "That's an American term. We've been playing a lot of Antichrist Superstar – stuff that makes us happiest. In turn, that'll make the audience happier. [Of the newer songs] I love playing 'Pistol Whipped', because I play guitar like a complete asshole."

== Set list ==
Australia Leg
- "Track 99" served as the intro for the tour.
1. "Antichrist Superstar"
2. "Disposable Teens"
3. "The Love Song"
4. "Little Horn"
5. "The Dope Show"
6. "Rock Is Dead"
7. "Personal Jesus"
8. "mOBSCENE"
9. "Sweet Dreams (Are Made of This)"
10. "Irresponsible Hate Anthem"

Encore

11. "The Beautiful People" (with "Baby, You're a Rich Man" intro)
Asia Leg
- "The WASP (Texas Radio and the Big Beat)" served as the intro for the tour.
1. "Antichrist Superstar"
2. "Disposable Teens"
3. "The Love Song"
4. "Little Horn"
5. "The Dope Show"
6. "Rock Is Dead"
7. "Tourniquet"
8. "Personal Jesus"
9. "mOBSCENE"
10. "Sweet Dreams (Are Made of This)"
11. "Irresponsible Hate Anthem"

Encore

12. "Coma White"
13. "1996 (Spoken Verses)"
14. "The Beautiful People" (with "Baby, You're a Rich Man" intro)
North America Leg #1, #2 & Europe Leg #1
- "Suspiria" served as the intro for the tour.
1. "Hey Cruel World"
2. "Disposable Teens"
3. "The Love Song"
4. "No Reflection"
5. "mOBSCENE"
6. "The Dope Show" (with "Diary of a Dope Friend" intro)
7. "Slo-Mo-Tion"
8. "Rock Is Dead"
9. "Personal Jesus"
10. "Pistol Whipped"
11. "Tourniquet"
12. "Coma White" (with "Coma Black" intro)
13. "Irresponsible Hate Anthem"
14. "Sweet Dreams (Are Made of This)

Encore

15. "Antichrist Superstar"
16. "The Beautiful People" (with "Baby You're a Rich Man" intro)
17. "Murderers Are Getting Prettier Every Day (only performed in St. Petersburg)
- "You're So Vain" served as the outro for the tour.
Twins Of Evil Tour (North America & Europe)
- "Suspiria" served as the intro for the tour.
1. "Hey Cruel World"
2. "Disposable Teens"
3. "The Love Song"
4. "No Reflection"
5. "mOBSCENE"
6. "The Dope Show" (with "Happiness Is a Warm Gun" intro)
7. "Slo-Mo-Tion"
8. "Murderers Are Getting Prettier Every Day" (only in selected dates for North America)
9. "Rock Is Dead"
10. "Personal Jesus"
11. "The Reflecting God" (only in selected dates for North America)
12. "Tourniquet" (only in selected dates for North America)
13. "Sweet Dreams (Are Made of This) (with "The Reflecting God" outro)
14. "Coma White/Coma Black"
15. "King Kill 33º"
16. "Antichrist Superstar"

Encore

17. "The Beautiful People"
- "You're So Vain" served as the outro for the tour.
South America
- "Suspiria" served as the intro for the tour.
1. "Hey Cruel World"
2. "Disposable Teens"
3. "The Love Song"
4. "No Reflection"
5. "mOBSCENE"
6. "The Dope Show" (with "Happiness Is a Warm Gun" intro)
7. "Slo-Mo-Tion"
8. "Rock Is Dead"
9. "Personal Jesus"
10. "Sweet Dreams (Are Made of This)
11. "Coma White"
12. "King Kill 33º"
13. "Antichrist Superstar"

Encore

14. "The Beautiful People"
- "You're So Vain" served as the outro for the tour.

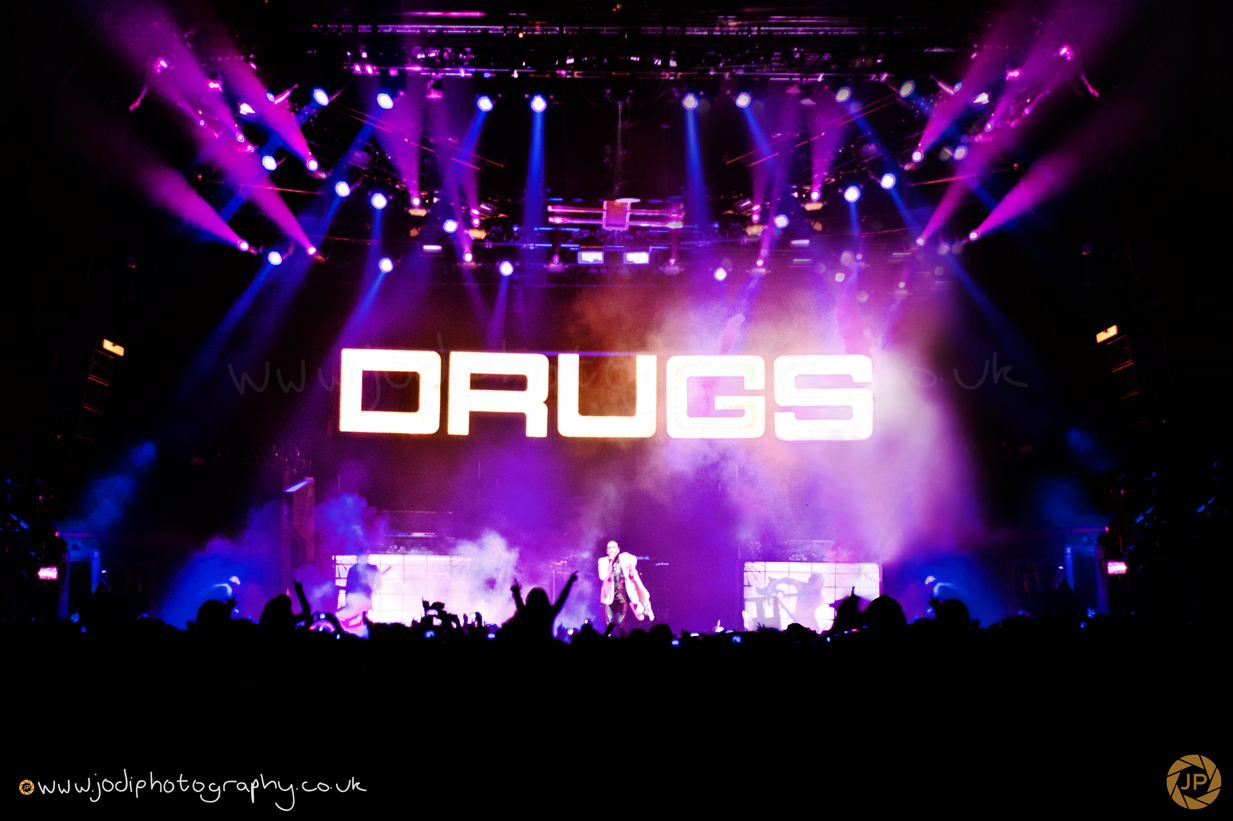
The band performing "I Don't Like the Drugs (But the Drugs Like Me)" during the Hey Cruel World... Tour

Europe, Leg #3
- "Suspiria" served as the intro for the tour.
1. "Hey Cruel World"
2. "Disposable Teens"
3. "The Love Song"
4. "No Reflection"
5. "mOBSCENE"
6. "The Dope Show"
7. "Slo-Mo-Tion"
8. "Rock Is Dead"
9. "Personal Jesus"
10. "The Last Day on Earth" (Only performed in Ukraine & Belarus)
11. "Sweet Dreams (Are Made of This)
12. "Coma White"
13. "King Kill 33º"
14. "Antichrist Superstar"

Encore

15. "The Beautiful People"
16. "Irresponsible Hate Anthem" (Only performed in Moscow, Ukraine & Belarus)
- "You're So Vain" served as the outro for the tour.

== Broadcasts & Recordings ==
Manson's set was recorded at the ROCK AM RING festival in Germany on 1 June 2012, but only three song performances (Hey Cruel World, Personal Jesus and Antichrist Superstar) have emerged online.

A video album has been in the works since 2007, with footage recorded at all tours since that time. It is unknown if the Hey Cruel World... Tour is included in this project or if the project has been cancelled owing to Manson's split from Interscope.

== Twins Of Evil ==
The Hey Cruel World... Tour featured a 'tour within a tour': the Twins of Evil Tour, a double bill coheadlined by Rob Zombie and Manson. Supporting each act's respective albums – 2010's Hellbilly Deluxe 2 and Born Villain – the tour visited arenas from September 28, 2012 through December 12, 2012. It was conceived as a follow-up to Zombie's Hellbilly Deluxe 2 World Tour and consisted of two legs, covering the United States and Europe.

In an interview with Kerrang, Manson shared his desire to record a live album on the Twins of Evil Tour. He noted the enthusiastic audience reaction, his satisfaction with the band lineup and "the way things sound live now."

== Lineup ==
- Marilyn Manson: Vocals, additional guitar
- Twiggy Ramirez: Guitar, bass, backing vocals
- Fred Sablan: Bass, guitar
- Jason Sutter: Drums

== Tour dates ==
List of concerts, showing date, city, country, and venue
Date	City	Country	Venue	Attendance	Revenue
Oceania ("Soundwave Festival")
24 February 2012^{1}	Brisbane	Australia	Eaton Hill Hotel	—	—
25 February 2012	Brisbane	Australia	RNA Showgrounds	—	—
26 February 2012	Sydney	Australia	Olympic Park Showgrounds	—	—
29 February 2012^{1}	Sydney	Australia	Enmore Theatre	—	—
2 March 2012	Melbourne	Australia	Royal Melbourne Showgrounds	—	—
3 March 2012	Adelaide	Australia	Bonython Park	—	—
5 March 2012	Perth	Australia	Claremont Showground	—	—
6 March 2012^{1}	Perth	Australia	Metro City Concert Club	—	—
Asia
9 March 2012	Tokyo	Japan	Studio Coast	—	—
10 March 2012	Tokyo	Japan	Studio Coast	—	—
12 March 2012	Osaka	Japan	Namba Hatch	—	—
13 March 2012	Nagoya	Japan	Zepp Nagoya	—	—
15 March 2012	Taipei	Taiwan	Taipei Show Hall	—	—
North America
27 April 2012	Providence	United States	Lupo's Heartbreak Hotel	—	—
28 April 2012	Hampton Beach	United States	Hampton Beach Casino Ballroom	—	—
29 April 2012	Huntington	United States	Paramount Theatre	—	—
1 May 2012	Silver Spring	United States	The Fillmore Silver Spring	—	—
2 May 2012	Montclair	United States	Wellmont Theatre	—	—
4 May 2012	Atlantic City	United States	House of Blues	2,550 / 2,550	$113,700
5 May 2012	Pittsburgh	United States	Stage AE	3,135 / 5,000	$119,732
6 May 2012	Grand Rapids	United States	The Orbit Room	—	—
8 May 2012	Des Moines	United States	Val Air Ballroom	—	—
9 May 2012	Sioux Falls	United States	KRRO Fest	—	—
11 May 2012	Dallas	United States	Palladium Ballroom	—	—
12 May 2012	San Antonio	United States	Historic Sunken Garden Theater	—	—
13 May 2012	Houston	United States	House of Blues	—	—
15 May 2012	Oklahoma City	United States	Diamond Ballroom	—	—
16 May 2012	Kansas City	United States	Uptown Theater	—	—
18 May 2012	Minneapolis	United States	The Brick	2,253 / 3,000	$111,714
19 May 2012	Milwaukee	United States	The Rave	—	—
20 May 2012	Columbus	United States	Rock on the Range	—	—
Europe
26 May 2012	Moscow	Russia	Arena Moscow	—	—
28 May 2012	Saint Petersburg	Russia	Yubileyny Sports Palace	—	—
31 May 2012	Neuchâtel	Switzerland	Neuchâtel Open Air Festival	—	—
1 June 2012	Nürburg	Germany	Rock am Ring	—	—
3 June 2012	Nuremberg	Germany	Rock im Park	—	—
4 June 2012	Tilburg	Netherlands	013	—	—
5 June 2012	Paris	France	Zénith de Paris	—	—
7 June 2012	Padua	Italy	Gran Teatro Geox	—	—
8 June 2012	Nickelsdorf	Austria	Nova Rock Festival	—	—
9 June 2012	Belgrade	Serbia	IQ Festival	—	—
12 June 2012	Kaunas	Lithuania	Žalgiris Arena	—	—
15 June 2012	Gothenburg	Sweden	Metaltown Festival	—	—
16 June 2012	Copenhagen	Denmark	Copenhell Festival	—	—
5 July 2012	London	England	Brixton Academy	—	—
6 July 2012	Liège	Belgium	Les Ardentes	—	—
7 July 2012	Amnéville	France	Sonisphere Festival	—	—
8 July 2012	Annecy	France	Arcadium	—	—
11 July 2012	Milan	Italy	Arena Civica	—	—
14 July 2012	Warsaw	Poland	Klub Stodola	—	—
15 July 2012	Prague	Czech Republic	Lucerna Hall	—	—
16 July 2012	Feldkirch	Austria	Poolbar Festival	—	—
19 July 2012	Carcassonne	France	Théâtre Jean Deschamps	—	—
21 July 2012	Benicàssim	Spain	Festival Costa De Fuego	—	—
North America, Leg#2
11 August 2012	Toronto	Canada	Heavy T.O.	—	—
12 August 2012	Montreal	Canada	Heavy MTL	—	—
18 August 2012	West Hollywood	United States	Sunset Strip Music Festival	—	—
North America, Leg#3: Twins of Evil Tour (w/ Rob Zombie)
28 September 2012	Phoenix	United States	Ashley Furniture HomeStore Pavilion	—	—
29 September 2012	Las Vegas	United States	Mandalay Bay Events Center	—	—
1 October 2012	West Valley City	United States	USANA Amphitheatre	—	—
2 October 2012	Denver	United States	1stBank Center	—	—
4 October 2012	Topeka	United States	Landon Arena	—	—
5 October 2012	Maryland Heights	United States	Verizon Wireless Amphitheater	—	—
8 October 2012	Lincoln	United States	Pershing Center	—	—
9 October 2012	Mankato	United States	Verizon Wireless Center	—	—
11 October 2012	Rosemont	United States	Allstate Arena	—	—
12 October 2012	Clarkston	United States	DTE Energy Music Theatre	—	—
13 October 2012	Bloomington	United States	U.S. Cellular Coliseum	—	—
15 October 2012	Youngstown	United States	Covelli Centre	—	—
16 October 2012	Rochester	United States	Main Street Armory	—	—
17 October 2012	New York City	United States	Hammerstein Ballroom	—	—
19 October 2012	Camden	United States	Susquehanna Bank Center	—	—
20 October 2012	Uncasville	United States	Mohegan Sun Arena	—	—
21 October 2012	Manchester	United States	Verizon Wireless Arena	—	—
23 October 2012	Glens Falls	United States	Glens Falls Civic Center	—	—
25 October 2012	Atlanta	United States	Aaron's Amphitheatre at Lakewood	—	—
27 October 2012	Tampa	United States	1-800-ASK-GARY Amphitheatre	—	—
29 October 2012	Little Rock	United States	Barton Coliseum	—	—
30 October 2012	Houston	United States	Reliant Arena	—	—
31 October 2012	Grand Prairie	United States	Verizon Theatre at Grand Prairie	—	—
North America, Leg#4 ("Maquinaria Festival")
2 November 2012	Mexico City	Mexico	Mexico City Arena	—	—
3 November 2012	Guadalajara	Mexico	Explanada Lopez Mateos	—	—
South America ("Maquinaria Festival")
8 November 2012	Buenos Aires	Argentina	G.E.B.A.	—	—
10 November 2012	Santiago	Chile	Club de Campo Las Vizcachas	—	—
13 November 2012^{2}	Quito	Ecuador	Coliseo General Rumiñahui	—	—
Europe, Leg#2: Twins of Evil Tour (w/ Rob Zombie)
26 November 2012	London	England	The O2 Arena	—	—
27 November 2012	Manchester	England	MEN Arena	—	—
28 November 2012	Glasgow	Scotland	Scottish Exhibition and Conference Centre	—	—
29 November 2012	Birmingham	England	National Indoor Arena	—	—
1 December 2012	Luxembourg City	Luxembourg	Rockhal	—	—
2 December 2012	Bochum	Germany	RuhrCongress	—	—
3 December 2012	Amsterdam	Netherlands	Heineken Music Hall	—	—
5 December 2012	Stockholm	Sweden	Hovet	—	—
6 December 2012	Copenhagen	Denmark	Valby-Hallen	—	—
8 December 2012	Vienna	Austria	Wiener Stadthalle	—	—
9 December 2012	Munich	Germany	Zenith	—	—
11 December 2012	Basel	Switzerland	St. Jakobshalle	—	—
12 December 2012	Bologna	Italy	Unipol Arena	—	—
Europe, Leg#3
15 December 2012	Yekaterinburg	Russia	Yekaterinburg Sports Palace	—	—
16 December 2012	Yekaterinburg	Russia	Yekaterinburg Sports Palace	—	—
18 December 2012	Moscow	Russia	Olympic Stadium	—	—
20 December 2012	Kyiv	Ukraine	Palace of Sports	—	—
21 December 2012	Minsk	Belarus	Minsk Sports Palace	—	—
North America, Leg#5
18 January 2013	Milwaukee	United States	The Rave	—	—
19 January 2013	Cincinnati	United States	Bogart's	—	—
20 January 2013	Columbus	United States	The LC Pavilion	2,200 / 2,200	$85,842
22 January 2013	Detroit	United States	The Fillmore Detroit	—	—
24 January 2013	Cleveland	United States	House of Blues	—	—
25 January 2013	Wallingford	United States	The Dome	—	—
26 January 2013	Boston	United States	House of Blues	—	—
28 January 2013	Montreal	Canada	Métropolis	2,200 / 2,200	$109,342
29 January 2013	Oshawa	Canada	General Motors Centre	1,916 / 2,596	$102,262
30 January 2013	Hamilton	Canada	Hamilton Place Theatre	—	—
1 February 2013	Greater Sudbury	Canada	Sudbury Arena	—	—
4 February 2013	Winnipeg	Canada	MTS Centre	—	—
5 February 2013	Moose Jaw	Canada	Mosaic Place	—	—
6 February 2013	Saskatoon	Canada	TCU Place	—	—
8 February 2013	Calgary	Canada	Stampede Corral	—	—
9 February 2013	Edmonton	Canada	Shaw Conference Centre	—	—
11 February 2013	Vancouver	Canada	Queen Elizabeth Theatre	—	—
12 February 2013	Seattle	United States	Showbox SoDo	—	—
13 February 2013	Portland	United States	Roseland Theater	—	—
15 February 2013	Modesto	United States	Modesto Center Plaza	—	—
17 February 2013	Reno	United States	Grand Sierra Resort	—	—
19 February 2013	San Francisco	United States	The Warfield	2,384 / 2,384	$107,663
20 February 2013	Anaheim	United States	City National Grove of Anaheim	1,700 / 1,700	$87,750
21 February 2013	Los Angeles	United States	Nokia Theater	2,405 / 2,405	$124,028
23 February 2013	Las Vegas	United States	House of Blues	—	—
North America, Leg#6
29 May 2013	San Diego	United States	House of Blues	—	—
30 May 2013	Tempe	United States	Marquee Theatre	—	—
North America, Leg#7: Masters of Madness: Shock Therapy Tour (w/ Alice Cooper)
1 June 2013	Albuquerque	United States	Isleta Amphitheater	—	—
3 June 2013	Morrison	United States	Red Rocks Amphitheatre	—	—
4 June 2013	West Valley City	United States	Utah First Credit Union Amphitheatre	—	—
6 June 2013	Los Angeles	United States	Gibson Amphitheatre	—	—
7 June 2013	Tucson	United States	AVA Amphitheater	—	—
8 June 2013	El Paso	United States	Don Haskins Center	—	—
10 June 2013	Grand Prairie	United States	Texas Trust CU Theatre	—	—
13 June 2013	Cleveland	United States	Jacobs Pavilion	—	—
14 June 2013	Buffalo	United States	Buffalo Outer Harbor Site	—	—
15 June 2013	Montebello	Canada	Marina Montebello	—	—
17 June 2013	Columbia	United States	Merriweather Post Pavilion	—	—
18 June 2013	Reading	United States	Sovereign Center	—	—
20 June 2013	Gilford	United States	Meadowbrook U.S. Cellular Pavilion	—	—
21 June 2013	Uncasville	United States	Mohegan Sun Arena	—	—
23 June 2013	Pittsburgh	United States	Stage AE	—	—
25 June 2013	St. Charles	United States	Family Arena	—	—
27 June 2013	Bonner Springs	United States	Cricket Wireless Amphitheater	—	—
28 June 2013	Rockford	United States	BMO Harris Bank Center	—	—
29 June 2013	Mount Pleasant	United States	Soaring Eagle Casino & Resort	—	—
North America, Leg#8
2 July 2013	Maplewood	United States	Myth	—	—
3 July 2013	Omaha	United States	Sokol Auditorium	—	—
5 July 2013	Chicago	United States	Riviera Theatre	—	—
6 July 2013	Indianapolis	United States	Old National Centre	—	—
8 July 2013	Fort Wayne	United States	Piere's	—	—
9 July 2013	Nashville	United States	War Memorial Auditorium	—	—
11 July 2013	Richmond	United States	National Theater	—	—
12 July 2013	Norfolk	United States	Norva Theatre	—	—
14 July 2013	North Myrtle Beach	United States	House of Blues	—	—
15 July 2013	Charlotte	United States	The Fillmore	—	—
17 July 2013	Atlanta	United States	The Tabernacle	—	—
18 July 2013	Hollywood	United States	Hard Rock Live	—	—
20 July 2013	St. Petersburg	United States	Jannus Live	—	—
21 July 2013	Miami Beach	United States	The Fillmore	—	—

- ^1 Headline shows, non Soundwave Festival dates.
- ^2 Headline show, non Maquinaria Festival date.

=== Cancelled or rescheduled shows ===
List of cancelled concerts, showing date, city, country, venue and reason for cancellation
Date	City	Country	Venue	Reason
Leg 4: Europe 2012
24 May 2012	Santa Cruz de Tenerife	Spain	Rock Coast Festival	Cancelled
8 July 2012	Knebworth	England	Sonisphere Festival	Cancelled
North America, Leg#3: Twins of Evil Tour (w/ Rob Zombie)
6 October 2012	Little Rock	United States	Barton Coliseum	The show was postponed because of crowd safety.
23 October 2012	Boston	United States	Agganis Arena	The show was cancelled because of Hurricane Sandy.
26 October 2012	Orlando	United States	Tinker Field	The show was cancelled because of Hurricane Sandy.
South America ("Maquinaria Festival")
6 November 2012	Asunción	Paraguay	Hipódromo de Asunción	The show was cancelled for unknown reasons.

== Box office score data ==
=== Headlining shows ===
List of box scores, showing date, city, venue, tickets sold compared to the number of available tickets and amount of gross revenue
Date	City	Venue	Attendance / Capacity	Revenue	Ref.
11 April 2012	Los Angeles	Nokia Theater	2,400 / 2,400	$110,211	

=== Festivals ===
Date	City	Festival	Attendance / Capacity	Revenue	Ref.
May 19–20, 2012	Columbus	Rock on the Range	69,110 / 75,000	$3,583,321	
