= List of Marilyn Manson band members =

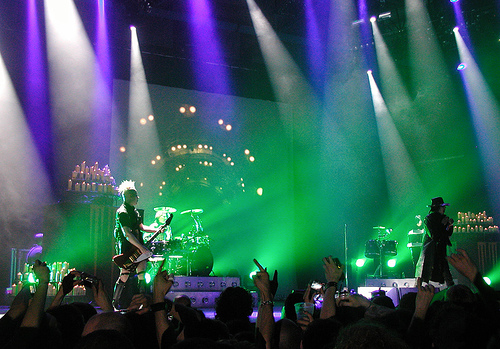
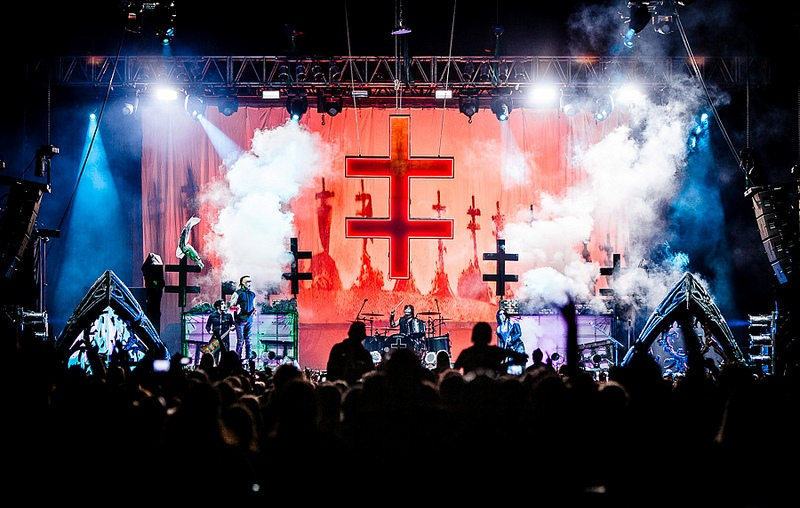
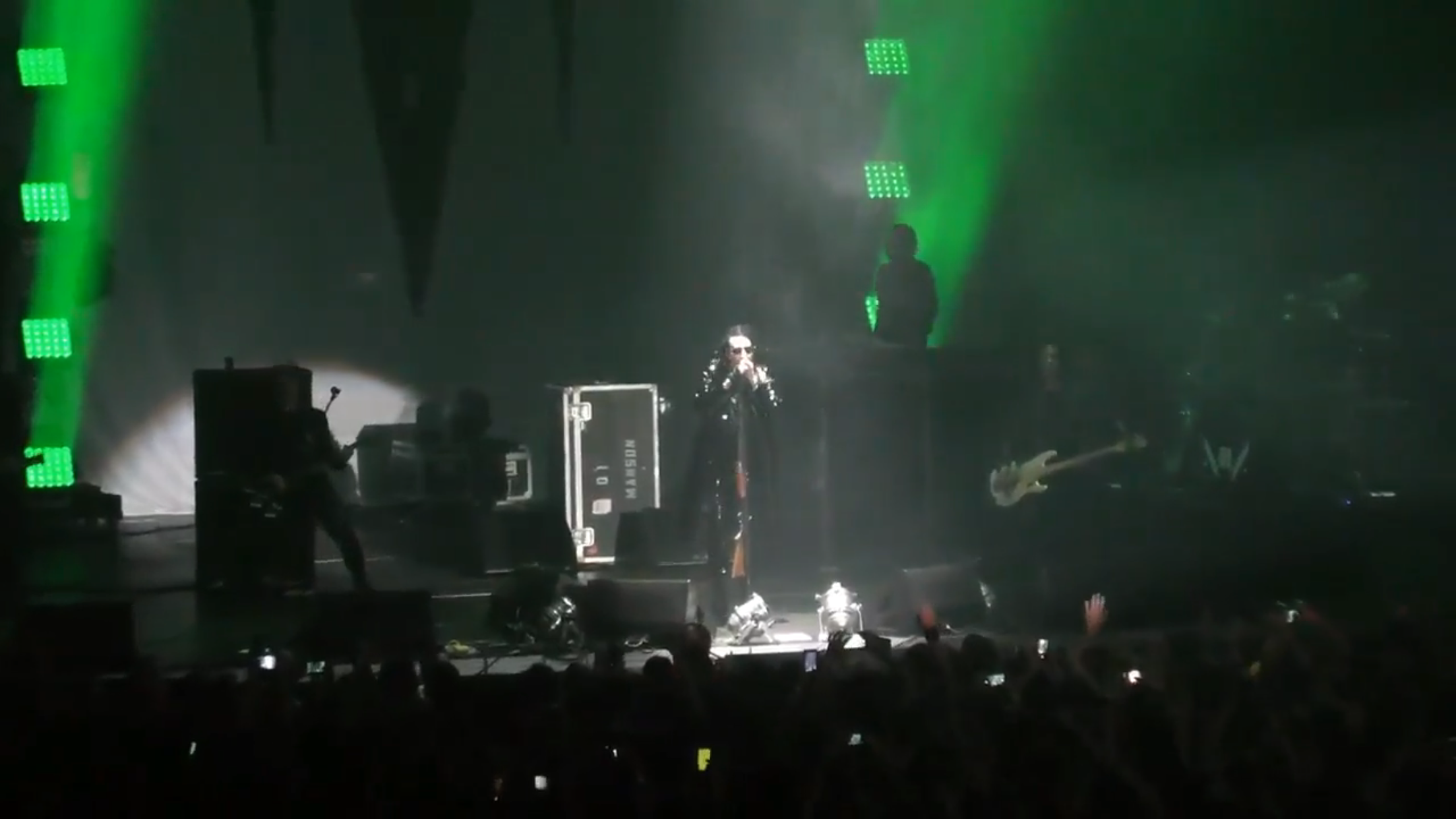
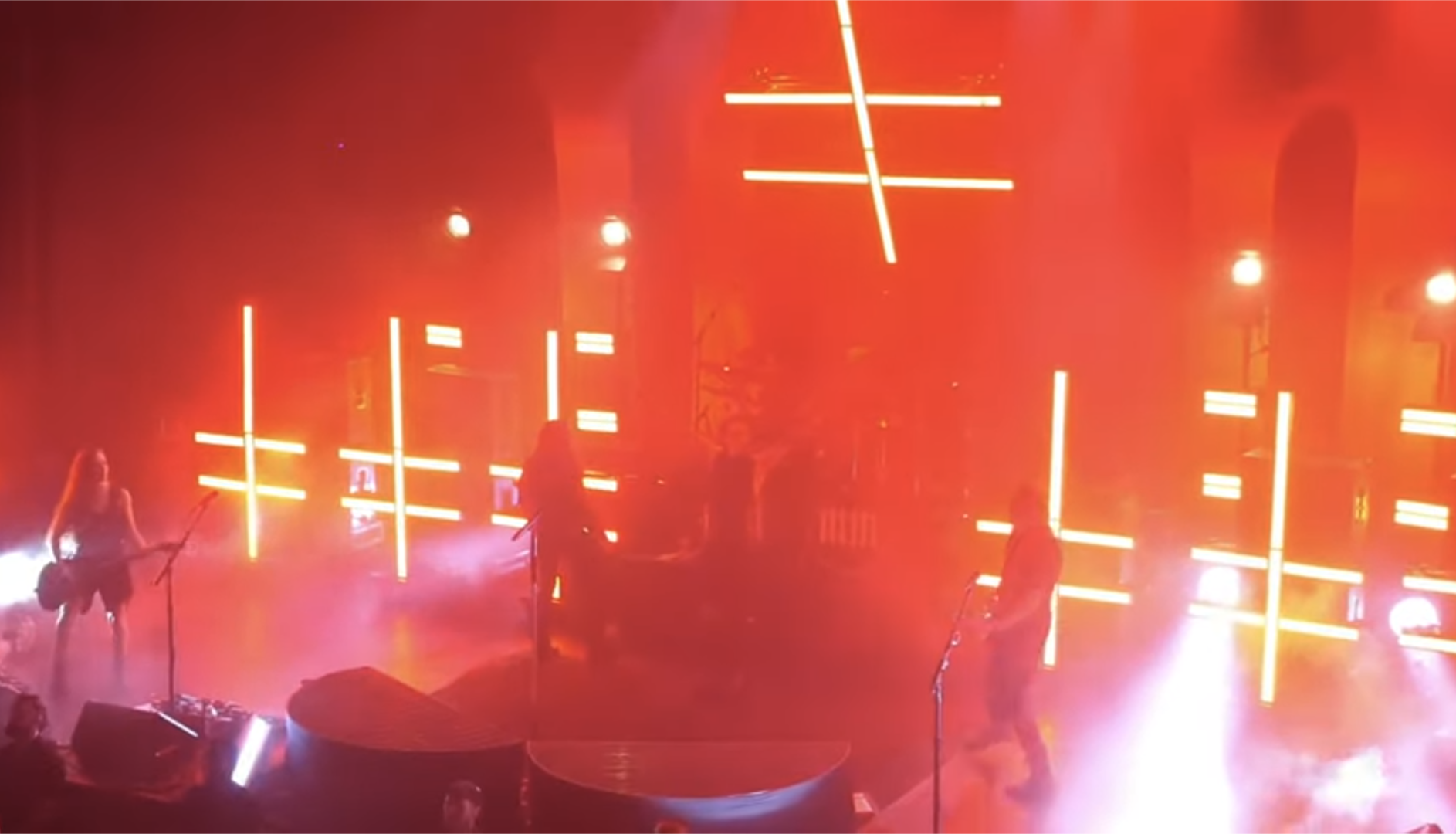
Marilyn Manson performing in 2007, 2012, 2017 and 2024

Marilyn Manson is an American rock band from Fort Lauderdale, Florida. Formed in 1989, the group was originally known as Marilyn Manson & the Spooky Kids and featured eponymous vocalist Marilyn Manson (real name Brian Warner), guitarist Daisy Berkowitz (real name Scott Putesky) and bassist Olivia Newton Bundy (real name Brian Tutunick), who were soon joined by keyboardist Zsa Zsa Speck (real name Perry Pandrea). The current line-up includes Manson, bassist Tim Sköld (who first joined in 2002), drummer Gil Sharone (who first joined in 2014), and guitarists Piggy D. (since 2024) and Nick Annis (since 2026).

== History ==
=== 1989–1996 ===
Marilyn Manson and Daisy Berkowitz formed Marilyn Manson & the Spooky Kids in December 1989, adding Olivia Newton Bundy to complete the band's first line-up. After recording their first demo The Raw Boned Psalms the following month, the trio added keyboardist Zsa Zsa Speck (Perry Pandrea) and performed their first string of live shows, before Bundy and Speck were replaced in June 1990 by Gidget Gein (Brad Stewart) and Madonna Wayne Gacy (Stephen Bier), respectively. In August 1991, the Spooky Kids became a five-piece with the addition of their first drummer Sara Lee Lucas (Fred Streithorst), after previously using a drum machine. The group played its last show under the Spooky Kids moniker on August 1, 1992, before it was dropped on the recommendation of their label Nothing Records.

During the recording of the band's full-length debut album Portrait of an American Family, Gein received a notice while in hospital recovering from a heroin overdose that his services "were no longer needed". His bass parts were retained from earlier sessions for The Manson Family Album, but he was subsequently replaced by Twiggy Ramirez (Jeordie White). In March 1995, during the subsequent touring cycle, Lucas left the group after an incident in which Manson lit his drum kit on fire while he was playing. He was replaced by Ginger Fish (Kenny Wilson) in time for the next run of shows. For 1996's Antichrist Superstar, much of the guitars were performed by Ramirez following Berkowitz's earlier departure, due to Manson and producer Trent Reznor's dismissal of many of his songwriting contributions.

=== 1996–2008 ===
Berkowitz was replaced by Zim Zum (Timothy Linton) in time for the Dead to the World Tour which followed the release of Antichrist Superstar. The new guitarist performed on 1998's Mechanical Animals, but left the band during its mixing stages to pursue a solo career, with John 5 (John Lowery) leaving Two to take his place. The Last Tour on Earth and Holy Wood (In the Shadow of the Valley of Death) followed, after which Ramirez left in May 2002 due to creative differences with Manson, to be replaced by Tim Skold. This lineup recorded The Golden Age of Grotesque, before Lowery was dismissed on March 30, 2004, for unknown reasons. In a 2009 interview, Lowery claimed that "It was completely amicable. He just wanted to write with other members of the band, and I wanted to do other things."

Lowery was replaced on the Against All Gods Tour by Mark Chaussee, which started in October 2004. Chris Vrenna also temporarily substituted for Fish on drums, who had been injured after falling from the stage at an awards show the previous month. During 2006 and 2007, Manson and Skold collaborated on the band's next album Eat Me, Drink Me without Fish, although he remained an official member of the group. For the subsequent Rape of the World Tour, Vrenna returned to take Gacy's place on keyboards, initially temporarily. It was later revealed, however, that Gacy had sued Manson for alleged breach of contract relating to use of the band's earnings, and that he hadn't worked with the band for over a year. Rob Holliday performed bass on the 2007 tour, with Skold switching to guitar.

=== 2008–2017 ===
In January 2008, after the first leg of the Rape of the World Tour, Twiggy Ramirez returned to replace the outgoing Tim Skold and took over bass duties, with Holliday switching to guitar. Former Limp Bizkit guitarist Wes Borland took over on guitar in August, but by the following February had left again to reform his original band. After the release of The High End of Low, which featured only Manson, Ramirez and Vrenna, the band toured with Andy Gerold on bass, as Ramirez took up the role of lead guitarist. In July 2010, Fred Sablan took over as Marilyn Manson's official bassist. Long-term drummer Ginger Fish left the band in February 2011, after temporarily touring with Rob Zombie and subsequently opting to join full-time. Vrenna switched roles until November, when he also departed.

In January 2012, Jason Sutter was announced to be the band's drummer for the upcoming Hey Cruel World... Tour. Spencer Rollins was brought in on keyboards and additional guitar for the Masters of Madness Tour in 2013. In November 2013, drummer Gil Sharone shared a video of an unidentified recording session, which was revealed early the following year to have been for the Marilyn Manson band. The new lineup was officially unveiled at the band's first show of the year in June 2014, featuring Tyler Bates and Paul Wiley on guitars, and Ramirez in place of the departed Sablan on bass. The Pale Emperor, released in 2015, featured only Manson, Bates and Sharone, as Ramirez was busy working on other projects during the recording sessions. Daniel Fox joined on keyboards for 2015 tour dates.

=== 2017–2023 ===
Heaven Upside Down was released in 2017 and once again did not feature Twiggy Ramirez, after he decided that Bates's initial demo bass recordings were of sufficient quality for the album. In October 2017, between legs of the Heaven Upside Down Tour, Ramirez was fired from the band after becoming the subject of a sexual assault allegation from Jack Off Jill singer Jessicka Addams. He was replaced by Juan Alderete. After the conclusion of Twins of Evil: The Second Coming Tour at the end of 2018, Manson and Bates stopped working together. Sharone also left in March 2019 to work on other projects. He was replaced by Brandon Pertzborn in June, prior to the start of the Twins of Evil: Hell Never Dies Tour. In November 2021, former band member Tim Skold announced that he was once again working on material with Marilyn Manson.

=== 2024–present ===
In 2024, Sharone and Bates returned alongside guitarist Reba Meyers (Code Orange) and bassist Piggy D. (Rob Zombie). Bates amicably departed the band in January 2026. Tim Skold returned to the band the following year on bass, with Piggy D. and Nick Annis taking over on guitars from Meyers.

== Members ==
=== Current ===
Image	Name (real name)	Years active	Instruments	Release contributions
	Marilyn Manson (Brian Warner)	1989–present	lead vocals; rhythm guitar; keyboards; programming; percussion; tambourine; saxophone; pan flute; occasional drums	all Marilyn Manson releases
	Gil Sharone	2014–2019; 2024–present	drums	The Pale Emperor (2015); Heaven Upside Down (2017); One Assassination Under God – Chapter 1 (2024); One Assassination Under God – Chapter 2 (2026)
	Piggy D. (Matthew Montgomery)	2024–present	bass (2024–2026); rhythm guitar (2026–present); backing vocals	none to date
	Tim Skold	2002–2008; 2026–present	bass; guitars; keyboards; backing vocals	The Golden Age of Grotesque (2003); Eat Me, Drink Me (2007)
	Nick Annis	2026–present	lead guitar; backing vocals; Novation Launchpad	none to date

=== Former ===
Image	Name (real name)	Years active	Instruments	Release contributions
	Daisy Berkowitz (Scott Putesky)	1989–1996 (died 2017)	lead guitar; programming; percussion; harmonica	all Marilyn Manson releases from The Raw Boned Psalms (1990) to Antichrist Superstar (1996)
	Olivia Newton Bundy (Brian Tutunick)	1989–1990	bass	The Raw Boned Psalms (1990); The Beaver Meat Cleaver Beat (1990)
	Zsa Zsa Speck (Perry Pandrea)	1990	keyboards	The Beaver Meat Cleaver Beat (1990)
	Madonna Wayne Gacy (Stephen Bier)	1990–2007	keyboards; synthesizers; programming; samples; percussion; brass instruments	all Marilyn Manson releases from Big Black Bus (1990) to The Golden Age of Grotesque (2003)
	Gidget Gein (Brad Stewart)	1990–1993 (died 2008)	bass	all Marilyn Manson releases from Big Black Bus (1990) to Portrait of an American Family (1994)
	Sara Lee Lucas (Fred Streithorst)	1991–1995	drums; programming	all Marilyn Manson releases from After School Special (1992) to Portrait of an American Family (1994)
	Twiggy Ramirez (Jeordie White)	1993–2002; 2008–2017 (touring 2014–2017)	bass; guitars; keyboards; backing vocals	all Marilyn Manson releases from Smells Like Children (1995) to Guns, God and Government World Tour (2002); The High End of Low (2009); Born Villain (2012)
	Ginger Fish (Kenny Wilson)	1995–2011 (inactive 2004–2005)	drums; programming; occasional keyboards	all Marilyn Manson releases from Smells Like Children (1995) to The Golden Age of Grotesque (2003); The High End of Low (2009) – guest appearance on one track
	Zim Zum (Timothy Linton)	1996–1998	guitars; keyboards	Dead to the World (1998); Mechanical Animals (1998)
	John 5 (John Lowery)	1998–2004	guitars; keyboards	all Marilyn Manson releases from God Is in the T.V. (1999) to The Golden Age of Grotesque (2003)
	Chris Vrenna	2007–2011 (studio 1996) (touring 2004–2005)	keyboards; synthesizers; programming; samples; drums (1996, 2004–05 and 2011)	Antichrist Superstar (1996); The High End of Low (2009); Born Villain (2012)
	Fred Sablan	2010–2014	bass; rhythm guitar	Born Villain (2012)
	Tyler Bates	2014–2015; 2015–2018; 2024–2026	lead guitar; bass; keyboards; backing vocals	The Pale Emperor (2015); Heaven Upside Down (2017); One Assassination Under God – Chapter 1 (2024); One Assassination Under God – Chapter 2 (2026)
	Paul Wiley	2018–2020 (touring 2014–2018)	rhythm guitar; lead guitar; programming; backing vocals	We Are Chaos (2020)
	Juan Alderete	2018–2020 (touring 2017–2018)	bass; backing vocals	We Are Chaos (2020)
	Brandon Pertzborn	2019–2020	drums	We Are Chaos (2020)

=== Touring ===
Image	Name	Years active	Instruments	Notes
	Mark Chaussee	2004–2005	lead guitar	Chaussee played lead guitar on the Against All Gods Tour, following the departure of John 5 in March 2004.
	Rob Holliday	2007–2008	bass (2007–08); guitars (2008); backing vocals	Holliday played bass on the Rape of the World Tour, then switched to lead guitar upon the return of Twiggy Ramirez.
	Wes Borland	2008–2009	lead guitar	Borland played lead guitar in Marilyn Manson for eight months before rejoining the reformed Limp Bizkit in early 2009.
	Andy Gerold	2009	bass	Gerold played bass on the High End of Low Tour, as Twiggy Ramirez switched from bass to guitar.
	Jason Sutter	2012–2013	drums	Sutter played drums on the Hey Cruel World, Twins of Evil and Masters of Madness Tours from 2012 to 2013.
	Spencer Rollins	2013	keyboards; guitars	Rollins played keyboards on tour dates in late 2013, after the band performed without a keyboardist for a year.
	Daniel Fox	2015–2017	keyboards; percussion	Drum technician Fox played keyboards and percussion for the group at tour dates between 2015 and 2017.
	Reba Meyers	2024–2026	rhythm guitar; lead guitar; backing vocals	

== Line-ups ==
Period	Members	Releases
December 1989 – January 1990 (as Marilyn Manson & the Spooky Kids)	Marilyn Manson – lead vocals, drums, keyboards; Daisy Berkowitz – guitars, programming, percussion; Olivia Newton Bundy – bass	The Raw Boned Psalms (1990)
January – June 1990 (as Marilyn Manson & the Spooky Kids)	Marilyn Manson – lead vocals, drums; Daisy Berkowitz – guitars, programming, percussion; Olivia Newton Bundy – bass; Zsa Zsa Speck – keyboards	The Beaver Meat Cleaver Beat (1990)
June 1990 – August 1991 (as Marilyn Manson & the Spooky Kids)	Marilyn Manson – lead vocals, drums; Daisy Berkowitz – guitars, programming, percussion; Gidget Gein – bass; Madonna Wayne Gacy – keyboards, programming, percussion	Big Black Bus (1990); Grist-o-Line (1990); Lunchbox (1991)
August 1991 – December 1993 (as Marilyn Manson & the Spooky Kids until early 1992, then as Marilyn Manson)	Marilyn Manson – lead vocals; Daisy Berkowitz – guitars, programming, percussion; Gidget Gein – bass; Madonna Wayne Gacy – keyboards, programming, percussion; Sara Lee Lucas – drums, programming	After School Special (1991); Live as Hell (1992); The Family Jams (1992); Refrigerator (1993)
December 1993 – March 1995	Marilyn Manson – lead vocals; Daisy Berkowitz – lead guitar, programming, percussion; Madonna Wayne Gacy – keyboards, programming, percussion; Sara Lee Lucas – drums, programming; Twiggy Ramirez – bass, rhythm guitar, keyboards, backing vocals	Portrait of an American Family (1994)
March 1995 – June 1996	Marilyn Manson – lead vocals; Daisy Berkowitz – lead guitar, programming, percussion; Madonna Wayne Gacy – keyboards, programming, percussion; Twiggy Ramirez – bass, rhythm guitar, keyboards, backing vocals; Ginger Fish – drums, programming	Smells Like Children (1995)
June 1996 – July 1998	Marilyn Manson – lead vocals; Madonna Wayne Gacy – keyboards, programming, percussion; Twiggy Ramirez – bass, rhythm guitar, keyboards, backing vocals; Ginger Fish – drums, programming; Zim Zum – lead guitar, keyboards	Antichrist Superstar (1996); "Long Hard Road Out of Hell" (1997); Remix & Repent; Dead to the World (1998)
July 1998 – May 2002	Marilyn Manson – lead vocals; Madonna Wayne Gacy – keyboards, programming, percussion; Twiggy Ramirez – bass, rhythm guitar, keyboards, backing vocals; Ginger Fish – drums, programming; John 5 – lead guitar, keyboards	Mechanical Animals (1998); God Is in the T.V. (1999); The Last Tour on Earth (1999); "Astonishing Panorama of the Endtimes" (1999); Holy Wood (In the Shadow of the Valley of Death) (2000); "Tainted Love" (2001)
May 2002 – March 2004	Marilyn Manson – lead vocals; Madonna Wayne Gacy – keyboards, programming, percussion; Ginger Fish – drums, programming; John 5 – lead guitar, keyboards; Tim Skold – bass, rhythm guitar, keyboards, backing vocals	Guns, God and Government (2002); The Golden Age of Grotesque (2003)
March – October 2004	Marilyn Manson – lead vocals; Madonna Wayne Gacy – keyboards, programming, percussion; Ginger Fish – drums, programming; Tim Skold – guitars, bass, keyboards, backing vocals	Lest We Forget: The Best Of (2004); Lest We Forget: The Best Of — The Videos (2004)
October 2004 – August 2005	Marilyn Manson – lead vocals; Madonna Wayne Gacy – keyboards, programming, percussion; Tim Skold – bass, rhythm guitar, keyboards, backing vocals; Mark Chaussee – lead guitar (touring); Chris Vrenna – drums (touring)	none – Against All Gods Tour only
August 2005 – May 2007	Marilyn Manson – lead vocals; Madonna Wayne Gacy – keyboards, programming, percussion; Tim Skold – guitars, bass, keyboards, backing vocals; Ginger Fish – drums, programming	Eat Me, Drink Me (2007) (features Manson and Skold only)
May 2007 – January 2008	Marilyn Manson – lead vocals, percussion; Tim Skold – guitars, bass, keyboards, backing vocals; Ginger Fish – drums, programming; Chris Vrenna – keyboards, programming; Rob Holliday – bass, backing vocals (touring)	none – Rape of the World Tour only
January – March 2008	Marilyn Manson – lead vocals, percussion; Ginger Fish – drums, programming; Chris Vrenna – keyboards, programming; Rob Holliday – lead guitar, backing vocals (touring); Twiggy Ramirez – bass, rhythm guitar, keyboards, backing vocals	none – Rape of the World Tour only
March – August 2008	Marilyn Manson – lead vocals, percussion; Ginger Fish – drums, programming; Chris Vrenna – keyboards, programming; Twiggy Ramirez – guitars, bass, keyboards, backing vocals	none – rehearsals and live shows only
August 2008 – February 2009	Marilyn Manson – lead vocals, percussion; Ginger Fish – drums, programming; Chris Vrenna – keyboards, programming; Twiggy Ramirez – bass, rhythm guitar, keyboards, backing vocals; Wes Borland – lead guitar (touring)	none – rehearsals and live shows only
February – June 2009	Marilyn Manson – lead vocals, percussion; Ginger Fish – drums, programming; Chris Vrenna – keyboards, programming; Twiggy Ramirez – guitars, bass, keyboards, backing vocals	The High End of Low (2009) (features Manson, Ramirez and Vrenna only)
June – December 2009	Marilyn Manson – lead vocals, percussion; Ginger Fish – drums, programming; Chris Vrenna – keyboards, programming; Twiggy Ramirez – guitars, bass, keyboards, backing vocals; Andy Gerold – bass (touring)	Guns, God and Government — Live in L.A. (2009)
December 2009 – July 2010	Marilyn Manson – lead vocals, percussion; Ginger Fish – drums, programming; Chris Vrenna – keyboards, programming; Twiggy Ramirez – guitars, bass, keyboards, backing vocals	none – rehearsals and live shows only
July 2010 – February 2011	Marilyn Manson – lead vocals, percussion; Ginger Fish – drums, programming; Chris Vrenna – keyboards, programming; Twiggy Ramirez – lead guitar, bass, keyboards, backing vocals; Fred Sablan – bass, rhythm guitar	none – rehearsals and live shows only
February 2011 – February 2012	Marilyn Manson – lead vocals, percussion; Chris Vrenna – drums, keyboards, programming; Twiggy Ramirez – lead guitar, bass, keyboards, backing vocals; Fred Sablan – bass, rhythm guitar	Born Villain (2011); Born Villain (2012)
February 2012 – June 2013	Marilyn Manson – lead vocals, drums, percussion, programming; Twiggy Ramirez – lead guitar, bass, keyboards, backing vocals; Fred Sablan – bass, rhythm guitar; Jason Sutter – drums (touring)	none – Hey Cruel World... Tour only
June – July 2013	Marilyn Manson – lead vocals, drums, percussion, programming; Twiggy Ramirez – guitars, bass, keyboards, backing vocals; Fred Sablan – bass, guitars; Jason Sutter – drums (touring); Spencer Rollins – keyboards, guitars (touring)	none – Masters of Madness Tour only
July 2013 – June 2014	Marilyn Manson – lead vocals, drums, percussion, programming; Twiggy Ramirez – lead guitar, bass, keyboards, backing vocals; Fred Sablan – bass, rhythm guitar	none – rehearsals only
June 2014 – June 2015	Marilyn Manson – lead vocals, percussion, programming; Twiggy Ramirez – bass, rhythm guitar, keyboards, backing vocals (touring); Gil Sharone – drums; Tyler Bates – lead guitar, keyboards, bass, backing vocals; Paul Wiley – rhythm guitar, programming, backing vocals (touring)	The Pale Emperor (2015) (features Manson, Sharone and Bates only)
June 2015 – July 2017	Marilyn Manson – lead vocals; Twiggy Ramirez – bass, guitars, keyboards, backing vocals (touring); Gil Sharone – drums; Tyler Bates – guitars, keyboards, bass, backing vocals; Paul Wiley – guitars, programming, backing vocals (touring); Daniel Fox – keyboards, percussion (touring)	Heaven Upside Down (2017) (features Manson, Sharone and Bates only)
July – October 2017	Marilyn Manson – lead vocals; Twiggy Ramirez – bass, rhythm guitar, keyboards, backing vocals (touring); Gil Sharone – drums; Tyler Bates – lead guitar, keyboards, bass, backing vocals; Paul Wiley – rhythm guitar, programming, backing vocals (touring)	none – Heaven Upside Down Tour only
October 2017 – December 2018	Marilyn Manson – lead vocals; Gil Sharone – drums; Tyler Bates – lead guitar, keyboards, bass, backing vocals; Paul Wiley – rhythm guitar, programming, backing vocals (touring); Juan Alderete – bass, backing vocals (touring)	"Cry Little Sister" (2018) (features Manson, Sharone and Bates only)
December 2018 – June 2019	Marilyn Manson – lead vocals, rhythm guitar; Gil Sharone – drums; Paul Wiley – lead guitar, programming, backing vocals; Juan Alderete – bass, backing vocals	none – studio rehearsals only
June 2019 – February 2020	Marilyn Manson – lead vocals, rhythm guitar; Paul Wiley – lead guitar, programming, backing vocals; Juan Alderete – bass, backing vocals; Brandon Pertzborn – drums	"God's Gonna Cut You Down" (2019); "The End" (2019); We Are Chaos (2020)
August 2024 – Early 2026	Marilyn Manson – lead vocals; Gil Sharone – drums; Tyler Bates – lead guitar, keyboards, bass, backing vocals; Piggy D. – bass, backing vocals (touring); Reba Meyers – rhythm guitar, backing vocals (touring)	One Assassination Under God – Chapter 1 (2024)
Early 2026 – present	Marilyn Manson – lead vocals; Gil Sharone – drums; Piggy D. – rhythm guitar, backing vocals (touring); Tim Sköld – bass, backing vocals; Nick Annis – lead guitar, backing vocals, Novation Launchpad (touring)	One Assassination Under God – Chapter 2 (2026)
