= The Hell Not Hallelujah Tour =

2015–16 concert tour by Marilyn Manson

- World tour by Marilyn Manson
- Promotional poster for The Hell Not Hallelujah Tour
- Associated album: The Pale Emperor
- Start date: January 21, 2015
- End date: November 6, 2016
- Legs: 11
- No. of shows: 118 in North America; 24 in Europe; 6 in Oceania; 5 in Asia; 3 in South America; 159 total (3 canceled)

Marilyn Manson concert chronology
- Masters of Madness Tour (2013); The Hell Not Hallelujah Tour (2015–16) The End Times Tour (2015); Heaven Upside Down Tour (2017–18)

The Hell Not Hallelujah Tour is the fourteenth concert tour by American rock band Marilyn Manson. It launched in support of their ninth studio album, The Pale Emperor, which was released on January 20, 2015, in the United States. Beginning on January 21, 2015, the tour includes eleven legs spanning North and South America, Australia, Europe and Japan with a total of 156 shows. Hell Not Hallelujah is the group's tenth tour to spread over multiple legs spanning over multiple continents. The live band for this tour includes Marilyn Manson on vocals and Twiggy on bass guitar, and featured newcomers Tyler Bates on lead guitar, Paul Wiley on rhythm guitar, Daniel Fox on percussions and keyboards and Gil Sharone on drums. Bates left the touring lineup after the April 11, 2015 show at the Minot Municipal Auditorium in North Dakota, and was replaced on lead guitar by Paul Wiley.

== Development and concert synopsis ==
Marilyn Manson described the central theme of the show as an evocation of two sides of the American Deep South: the Voodoo of the Louisiana swamp lands and the "Evangelical fervor of some of the region's churches". Manson began shows wearing a charcoal pea coat and a leather bustier vest, which were gradually removed as the show went on. Bobby Olivier from NJ.com complimented Manson's appearance and the aesthetic of the show, comparing it to the concept of The Pale Emperor and saying "his white makeup fades as the show goes on, as if he's slowly returning to his rarely seen, mortal form".

Compared to the band's previous tours, the show was stripped back and contained fewer theatrics. The stage set would typically be decorated to resemble a church, with two large stained glass window panels placed on either side of the stage, while numerous stage props would be emblazoned with the Cross of Lorraine. During performances of "Personal Jesus" or "Antichrist Superstar", a white pulpit would be introduced, from where Manson would burn a book of scripture. For performances of "Killing Strangers", Manson would brandish a knife-shaped microphone, which he would use to repeatedly stab a tambourine. For encores, a falling ash effect was used on stage, similar to the effect used during the Rock Is Dead Tour in 1998. Following the November 2015 terrorist attacks in Paris and the cancellation of the band's subsequent performance at Le Zénith, the stage was illuminated with the French tricolor for the remainder of the tour.

=== Box cutter incident ===
Relations between the vocalist and Bates almost deteriorated when Manson threatened the guitarist on-stage with a box-cutter knife. Bates said the incident stemmed from Manson "breaking beer bottles so he could cut himself, but the shards of glass were hitting our drummer Gil. I got really pissed and told him to stop with the fucking glass. ... so he like, kicked a [bottle] and it hit me on stage and I'd just had enough. I said, 'What the fuck?'. So instead of the bottle, he pulls out a box cutter and says 'You want me to cut you open with this box cutter, Tyler Bates?' I said, 'You fucking come near me and I'll kill you with that box cutter!'" Bates renamed his music publishing company Box Cutter Music in honor of the incident.

On April 14, Tyler Bates announced that he had amicably retired from the band's touring line-up, stating that he helped put the band together with the intention that it could function without him when "pre-existing commitments in the film and television industry would be too demanding to handle responsibly from the road". The tour's original rhythm guitarist, Paul Wiley, took over on lead guitar for the duration of the tour.

== Co-headlining tours ==
The Hell Not Hallelujah Tour featured two co-headlining tours. The End Times Tour was a North American tour co-headlined with American rock band The Smashing Pumpkins. Beginning on July 7 in Concord, California and concluding in Cincinnati on August 8, it spanned 24 dates and visited arenas in the United States and Canada. American hip hop recording artist Cage served as the opening act for the entirety of the tour.

On February 29, 2016, the band announced details of a co-headlining tour with American heavy metal band Slipknot. The tour will see the bands performing throughout North America, and was scheduled to begin at the USANA Amphitheatre in Salt Lake City on June 9, culminating with a show at the Wells Fargo Arena in Slipknot's home town of Des Moines. However, the first twelve dates of the tour were postponed after a physical examination revealed that Slipknot frontman Corey Taylor had broken two vertebrae in his neck. The tour will now begin on June 28 in Nashville, Tennessee, with the postponed shows rescheduled for August. American metalcore band Of Mice & Men will serve as supporting act on the 39-date tour.

== Critical response ==
The first North American leg of the tour received positive reviews from critics, with several reviewers commending Manson's performance. Melina Robinson of The Las Vegas Sun, in a review of the band's concert at the House of Blues on Valentine's Day, said that in comparison to the band's 2012 Las Vegas show, Manson was "a revived performer who was more reminiscent of the '90's Manson. His gestures, stage theatrics and signature guttural growl brought any tenured Manson fan back to day's past". Bree Davis of Westword said that Manson's stage presence "heightened the desired sense of faux-trauma — Manson's ability to produce an effective illusion of control over both his band and his audience is what is perhaps more timeless than the music he creates", and likened Manson's on-stage qualities to that of a politician or cult leader. Nicole Malczan, reviewing for Alternative Nation, complimented Manson's vocals as "raw and still powerful" and praised the show for its stripped-down production, saying that "those who hoped for some shock value may have been disappointed. Just like with his new album, last night [Manson] stripped back several layers to reveal a performer that doesn't need flourishes to still entertain the hell out of a crowd". Other reviews lauded the live band, with Michael Rancic of NOW Toronto calling them Manson's "strongest live band in recent memory", and said that the set list was "visceral and engaging from start to finish". Similarly, Jim Louvau, writing for Phoenix New Times, said that the band has "probably never sounded better". Marc Hirsh of The Boston Globe wrote that several songs on the set list "hit with the impact of a wrecking ball", and said that "no matter how thudding and metallic the songs were, they were almost uniformly tuneful, and the hard shuffle that ran like a thread through the beat gave plenty of them a decadent swing". Allison Cohn of 303 commended Manson's vocal performance and said that she was "blown away by the quality of the music. Each song was loud, aggressive and throbbing with rage and energy".

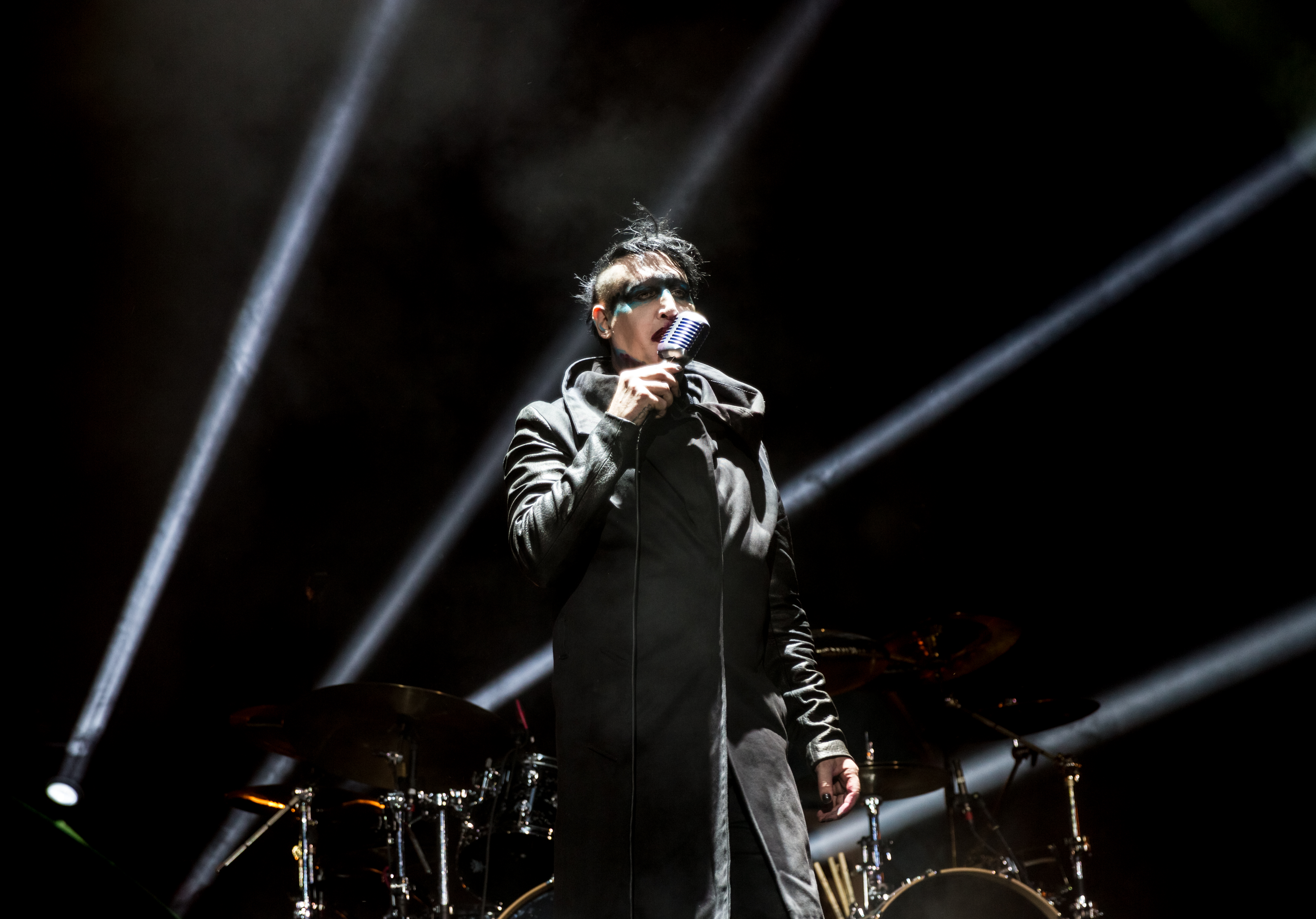
Manson performing at Rock am Ring 2015.

FasterLouder listed Marilyn Manson as one of the acts who "dominated day one of the Melbourne leg of Soundwave 2015", reporting that the band drew "one of the biggest crowds of the day", and said that Manson's "God-like aura on stage cannot be denied." Martin Michea, when reviewing the band's show at the Enmore Theatre in Sydney, commended the stage show as "top drawer stuff" and compared the crowd's reaction to Manson to that received by opening acts Deathstars and Apocalyptica, saying that the audience was "a lot better during the headliner set. [Manson] really deserved that response, because he put on a great show. Especially for the front row. I don't think I have ever seen anyone else interact with the audience as much".

Mike Ross of the Edmonton Sun said that "it was clear from such a no-nonsense, dramatic and sturdy show that Manson has risen to the occasion to do more with less, to do the heavy lifting himself minus the gimmicks" and said that Manson and the band "proved themselves [to be] a real rock band. A tight one". David Rader of Midwest Music Scene commended Manson's show at the Brady Theater as "one of the best of 2015 so far for sure", saying that "you really can't ask for a better rock show than the one Marilyn Manson put on for Tulsa".

Dom Lawson of The Guardian commended the band's headline set at the Download Festival, calling Manson a "rejuvenated performer" before saying that he was "back to his malevolent, haughty best". Joseph Goggins of Manchester Evening News said that Manson sounds "all the better for abandoning the constant instinct to try to shock as much as possible; instead, he's turned to firing through an impressive back catalogue with the confidence – maybe even the arrogance – that it merits", awarding the gig four stars out of five. In his review of the band's concert at London's Hammersmith Apollo, NME's James Bentley was similarly positive, saying "while the older Manson lacks the otherworldly vigour that his younger self did, his hoarse screeches sound better than ever". Reviewing the same gig, Andrew Trendell of Gigwise lauded the band's performance, saying that Manson "still has as much impact now than ever", as well as complimenting "the sheer calibre and range of the ground he's covered [during the band's career]".

== Set list ==
This set list is representative of the performance on January 24, 2015. It does not represent the set list of all concerts for the duration of the tour, which typically ranged in length between 90 minutes and two and a half hours.

1. "Deep Six"
2. "Disposable Teens"
3. "mOBSCENE"
4. "No Reflection"
5. "Killing Strangers"
6. "Sweet Dreams (Are Made of This)"
7. "Cupid Carries a Gun"
8. "Rock Is Dead"
9. "The Dope Show"
10. "Third Day of a Seven Day Binge"
11. "Personal Jesus"
12. "This Is the New Shit"
13. "The Mephistopheles of Los Angeles"
14. "The Beautiful People"
15. "Irresponsible Hate Anthem"
16. "Coma White"

== Tour dates ==
List of concerts, showing date, city, country, and venue
Date	City	Country	Venue	Opening Act(s)	Attendance	Revenue
Leg 1: North America 2015
January 21, 2015	Washington DC	United States	The Fillmore	n/a	—N/a	—N/a
January 23, 2015	Philadelphia	United States	Electric Factory	n/a	—N/a	—N/a
January 24, 2015	Sayreville	United States	Starland Ballroom	n/a	2,003 / 2,003	$109,890
January 28, 2015	Boston	United States	House of Blues	n/a	2,229 / 2,386	$113,450
January 29, 2015 (Note: The January 29, 2015 concert at Terminal 5 was originally scheduled for January 26. It was rescheduled due to Winter Storm Juno.)	New York City	United States	Terminal 5	n/a	3,000 / 3,000	—N/a
January 30, 2015	Pittsburgh	United States	Stage AE	n/a	2,300 / 2,300	$110,400
January 31, 2015	Bethlehem	United States	Sands Bethlehem	n/a	—N/a	—N/a
February 2, 2015	Toronto	Canada	Sound Academy	n/a	—N/a	—N/a
February 3, 2015	Detroit	United States	The Fillmore	n/a	—N/a	—N/a
February 5, 2015	Chicago	United States	Riviera Theatre	n/a	2,265 / 2,500	$122,310
February 6, 2015	Prior Lake	United States	Mystic Lake	n/a	2,100 / 2,100	—N/a
February 7, 2015	Milwaukee	United States	Eagles Ballroom	n/a	—N/a	—N/a
February 9, 2015	St Louis	United States	The Pageant	n/a	2,000 / 2,000	—N/a
February 11, 2015	Denver	United States	The Fillmore	n/a	—N/a	—N/a
February 13, 2015	Tempe	United States	Marquee Theatre	n/a	2,000 / 2,000	—N/a
February 14, 2015	Las Vegas	United States	House of Blues	n/a	2,000 / 2,000	—N/a
Leg 2: Oceania 2015
February 21, 2015 (Note: The February 21, 22, 28 and March 1 concerts in Australia were part of the Soundwave Festival.)	Melbourne	Australia	RAS Melbourne Showgrounds	n/a	—N/a	—N/a
February 22, 2015	Adelaide	Australia	Bonython Park	n/a	—N/a	—N/a
February 25, 2015 (Note: The February 25 and 27 concerts in Australia were joint shows featuring Apocalyptica and Deathstars.)	Sydney	Australia	Enmore Theatre	n/a	—N/a	—N/a
February 27, 2015	Brisbane	Australia	Tivoli Theatre	n/a	—N/a	—N/a
February 28, 2015	Brisbane	Australia	Brisbane Showgrounds	n/a	—N/a	—N/a
March 1, 2015	Sydney	Australia	Olympic Park	n/a	—N/a	—N/a
Leg 3: North America 2015
March 25, 2015	Portland	United States	Roseland Theater	n/a	1,400 / 1,400	—N/a
March 26, 2015	Seattle	United States	The Showbox	n/a	—N/a	—N/a
March 28, 2015	Penticton	Canada	South Okanagan Events Centre	n/a	—N/a	—N/a
March 29, 2015	Vancouver	Canada	Queen Elizabeth Theatre	n/a	—N/a	—N/a
March 31, 2015	Prince George	Canada	CN Centre	n/a	—N/a	—N/a
April 1, 2015	Dawson Creek	Canada	EnCana Events Centre	n/a	—N/a	—N/a
April 2, 2015	Edmonton	Canada	Shaw Conference Centre	n/a	4,000 / 4,000	—N/a
April 4, 2015	Lethbridge	Canada	ENMAX Centre	n/a	—N/a	—N/a
April 6, 2015	Saskatoon	Canada	SaskTel Centre	n/a	—N/a	—N/a
April 7, 2015	Regina	Canada	Brandt Centre	n/a	—N/a	—N/a
April 9, 2015	Winnipeg	Canada	MTS Centre	n/a	3,500 / 3,500	—N/a
April 10, 2015	Fargo	United States	Fargo Civic Center	n/a	—N/a	—N/a
April 11, 2015	Minot	United States	Minot Municipal Auditorium	n/a	—N/a	—N/a
April 24, 2015	Athens	United States	Georgia Theatre	n/a	—N/a	—N/a
April 25, 2015	Jacksonville	United States	Welcome to Rockville Festival	n/a	50,000 / 50,000	$2,994,636
April 26, 2015	Birmingham	United States	Iron City Birmingham	n/a	1,300 / 1,300	$79,950
April 28, 2015	Oklahoma	United States	Bricktown Events Center	n/a	—N/a	—N/a
April 29, 2015	Tulsa	United States	Brady Theater	n/a	4,200 / 4,200	—N/a
April 30, 2015	Memphis	United States	Minglewood Hall	n/a	1,600 / 1,600	$88,000
May 2, 2015	Concord	United States	Carolina Rebellion Festival	n/a	80,000 / 80,000	$3,438,222
May 3, 2015	North Myrtle Beach	United States	House of Blues	n/a	—N/a	—N/a
May 5, 2015	Norfolk	United States	Norva Theatre	n/a	—N/a	—N/a
May 6, 2015	Richmond	United States	The National Theater	n/a	—N/a	—N/a
May 8, 2015	Knoxville	United States	The International	n/a	—N/a	—N/a
May 9, 2015	Chattanooga	United States	Track 29	n/a	—N/a	—N/a
May 11, 2015	Peoria	United States	Limelight Eventplex	n/a	—N/a	—N/a
May 12, 2015	Madison	United States	Orpheum Theatre	n/a	—N/a	—N/a
May 13, 2015	Grand Rapids	United States	The Orbit Room	n/a	1,630 / 1,630	—N/a
May 15, 2015	Columbus	United States	Rock on the Range Festival	n/a	120,000 / 120,000	$4,293,389
May 16, 2015	Indianapolis	United States	Old National Center	n/a	—N/a	—N/a
Leg 4: Europe 2015
June 3, 2015	Nyon	Switzerland	Caribana Festival	n/a	—N/a	—N/a
June 5–7, 2015	Nürburg	Germany	Rock am Ring	n/a	90,000 / 90,000	$15,224,793
June 5–7, 2015	Mendig	Germany	Rock im Ring	n/a	75,000 / 75,000	$12,862,772
June 8, 2015	Copenhagen	Denmark	Vega	n/a	—N/a	—N/a
June 9, 2015	Oslo	Norway	Sentrum Scene	n/a	—N/a	—N/a
June 10, 2015	Stockholm	Sweden	Gröna Lund	n/a	17,000 / 17,000	—N/a
June 13, 2015	Donington Park	England	Download Festival	n/a	—N/a	—N/a
June 15, 2015	Amsterdam	Netherlands	Paradiso	n/a	—N/a	—N/a
June 17, 2015	Milan	Italy	Alcatraz	n/a	—N/a	—N/a
June 19, 2015	Dessel	Belgium	Graspop Festival	n/a	—N/a	—N/a
June 20, 2015	Clisson	France	Hellfest	n/a	—N/a	—N/a
Leg 5: The End Times Tour 2015 (with The Smashing Pumpkins)
July 7, 2015	Concord	United States	Concord Pavilion	Cage	—N/a	—N/a
July 9, 2015	Irvine	United States	Irvine Meadows Amphitheatre	Cage	16,085 / 16,085	—N/a
July 10, 2015	Las Vegas	United States	The Joint	Cage	4,136 / 4,136	$313,578
July 11, 2015	Phoenix	United States	Comerica Theatre	Cage	—N/a	—N/a
July 13, 2015	Morrison	United States	Red Rocks Amphitheatre	Cage	—N/a	—N/a
July 15, 2015	Dallas	United States	Gexa Energy Pavilion	Cage	—N/a	—N/a
July 16, 2015	Houston	United States	NRG Arena	Cage	—N/a	—N/a
July 18, 2015	San Antonio	United States	Freeman Coliseum	Cage	—N/a	—N/a
July 19, 2015	Austin	United States	Austin City Limits Live	Cage	—N/a	—N/a
July 20, 2015	New Orleans	United States	Bold Sphere Music	Cage	—N/a	—N/a
July 22, 2015	Miami	United States	Bayfront Park Amphitheatre	Cage	—N/a	—N/a
July 24, 2015	Tampa	United States	MidFlorida Amphitheatre	Cage	—N/a	—N/a
July 25, 2015	Atlanta	United States	Aaron's Amphitheatre	Cage	—N/a	—N/a
July 26, 2015	Raleigh	United States	Red Hat Amphitheater	Cage	—N/a	—N/a
July 28, 2015	Boston	United States	Leader Bank Pavilion	Cage	—N/a	—N/a
July 29, 2015	Holmdel	United States	PNC Bank Arts Center	Cage	—N/a	—N/a
July 31, 2015	Wantagh	United States	Jones Beach Theater	Cage	—N/a	—N/a
August 1, 2015	Mashantucket	United States	Foxwoods Resort Casino	Cage	—N/a	—N/a
August 2, 2015	Camden	United States	BB&T Pavilion	Cage	—N/a	—N/a
August 4, 2015	Toronto	Canada	Molson Amphitheatre	Cage	—N/a	—N/a
August 5, 2015	Clarkston	United States	DTE Energy Music Theatre	Cage	10,159 / 15,040	$286,693
August 7, 2015	Chicago	United States	FirstMerit Bank Pavilion	Cage	—N/a	—N/a
August 8, 2015	Cincinnati	United States	Riverbend Music Center	Cage	—N/a	—N/a
August 9, 2015	Nashville	United States	Ascend Amphitheater	Cage	—N/a	—N/a
Leg 6: Asia 2015
August 14, 2015	Tokyo	Japan	Sonic Mania Festival	n/a	—N/a	—N/a
August 15, 2015	Tokyo	Japan	Summer Sonic Festival	n/a	235,000 / 235,000	$26,500,000
August 16, 2015	Osaka	Japan	Summer Sonic Festival	n/a	235,000 / 235,000	$26,500,000
Leg 7: North America 2015
October 20, 2015	Santa Ana	United States	The Observatory OC	n/a	—N/a	—N/a
October 21, 2015	Los Angeles	United States	Ace Hotel Theater	n/a	1,526 / 1,526	$108,417
October 23, 2015	Paso Robles	United States	Vina Robles Amphitheatre	n/a	1,931 / 3,018	$76,740
October 24, 2015	Sacramento	United States	Aftershock Festival	n/a	—N/a	—N/a
October 26, 2015	San Diego	United States	House of Blues	n/a	—N/a	—N/a
October 27, 2015	Tucson	United States	Rialto Theatre	n/a	—N/a	—N/a
October 28, 2015	El Paso	United States	Tricky Falls	n/a	—N/a	—N/a
October 31, 2015	Biloxi	United States	Hard Rock Hotel and Casino	n/a	—N/a	—N/a
November 1, 2015	Shreveport	United States	Riverfront Festival Plaza	n/a	2,015 / 3,084	$84,759
Leg 8: Europe 2015
November 5, 2015	Leipzig	Germany	Haus Auensee	n/a	—N/a	—N/a
November 6, 2015	Berlin	Germany	Columbia Halle	n/a	—N/a	—N/a
November 7, 2015	Cologne	Germany	Palladium	n/a	—N/a	—N/a
November 9, 2015	Florence	Italy	Obihall	n/a	—N/a	—N/a
November 11, 2015	Zürich	Switzerland	X-Tra	n/a	—N/a	—N/a
November 12, 2015	Stuttgart	Germany	Porsche Arena	n/a	—N/a	—N/a
November 13, 2015	Vienna	Austria	Gasometer	n/a	—N/a	—N/a
November 15, 2015	Tilburg	Netherlands	013	n/a	—N/a	—N/a
November 18, 2015	Brussels	Belgium	Ancienne Belgique	n/a	—N/a	—N/a
November 19, 2015	London	England	Hammersmith Apollo	n/a	5,085 / 5,098	$251,391
November 21, 2015	Wolverhampton	England	Wolverhampton Civic Hall	n/a	—N/a	—N/a
November 22, 2015	Glasgow	Scotland	O2 Academy	n/a	—N/a	—N/a
November 23, 2015	Manchester	England	O2 Apollo	n/a	—N/a	—N/a
Leg 9: North America 2016 (with Slipknot)
June 28, 2016	Nashville	United States	Bridgestone Arena	n/a	7,443 / 13,995	$319,103
June 29, 2016	Atlanta	United States	Aaron's Amphitheatre	n/a	—N/a	—N/a
July 1, 2016	West Palm Beach	United States	Perfect Vodka Amphitheatre	n/a	—N/a	—N/a
July 2, 2016	Tampa	United States	MidFlorida Amphitheatre	n/a	—N/a	—N/a
July 5, 2016	Mansfield	United States	Xfinity Center	n/a	—N/a	—N/a
July 6, 2016	Wantagh	United States	Jones Beach Theater	n/a	—N/a	—N/a
July 8, 2016	Hartford	United States	Xfinity Theatre	n/a	—N/a	—N/a
July 9, 2016	Holmdel	United States	PNC Bank Arts Center	n/a	—N/a	—N/a
July 10, 2016	Hershey	United States	Giant Center	n/a	—N/a	—N/a
July 12, 2016	Cincinnati	United States	Riverbend Music Center	n/a	—N/a	—N/a
July 13, 2016	Noblesville	United States	Klipsch Music Center	n/a	—N/a	—N/a
July 14, 2016	Cadott	United States	Rock Fest	n/a	—N/a	—N/a
July 16, 2016	Milwaukee	United States	Eagles Ballroom	n/a	—N/a	—N/a
July 17, 2016	Bridgeview	United States	Chicago Open Air Festival	n/a	—N/a	—N/a
July 19, 2016	Toronto	Canada	Air Canada Centre	n/a	—N/a	—N/a
July 20, 2016	Montreal	Canada	Centre Bell	n/a	8,712 / 9,268	$477,419
July 21, 2016	Quebec (Note: It was announced mid-show that the band would not be performing at the venue. The date still went ahead, with Slipknot and opening act Of Mice & Men performing.)	Canada	Centre Vidéotron	n/a	9,335 / 9,826	$508,984
July 23, 2016	Syracuse	United States	Lakeview Amphitheater	n/a	—N/a	—N/a
July 24, 2016	Saratoga Springs	United States	Saratoga Performing Arts Center	n/a	—N/a	—N/a
July 26, 2016	Bristow	United States	Jiffy Lube Live	n/a	—N/a	—N/a
July 27, 2016	Camden	United States	BB&T Pavilion	n/a	—N/a	—N/a
July 29, 2016	Clarkston	United States	DTE Energy Music Theatre	n/a	—N/a	—N/a
July 30, 2016	Burgettstown	United States	First Niagara Pavilion	n/a	—N/a	—N/a
July 31, 2016	Virginia Beach	United States	Veterans United Amphitheater	n/a	—N/a	—N/a
August 2, 2016	Charlotte	United States	PNC Music Pavilion	n/a	—N/a	—N/a
August 4, 2016	Maryland Heights	United States	Hollywood Casino Amphitheatre	n/a	—N/a	—N/a
August 5, 2016	Des Moines	United States	Wells Fargo Arena	n/a	—N/a	—N/a
August 7, 2016	Denver	United States	Pepsi Center	n/a	—N/a	—N/a
August 9, 2016	Salt Lake City	United States	USANA Amphitheatre	n/a	—N/a	—N/a
August 11, 2016	Auburn	United States	White River Amphitheatre	n/a	—N/a	—N/a
August 13, 2016	Concord	United States	Concord Pavilion	n/a	—N/a	—N/a
August 14, 2016	Inglewood	United States	The Forum	n/a	12,642 / 12,642	$567,082
August 17, 2016	Chula Vista	United States	Sleep Train Amphitheatre	n/a	—N/a	—N/a
August 19, 2016	Albuquerque	United States	Isleta Amphitheater	n/a	—N/a	—N/a
August 20, 2016	Phoenix	United States	Ak-Chin Pavilion	n/a	—N/a	—N/a
August 21, 2016	Las Vegas	United States	T-Mobile Arena	n/a	—N/a	—N/a
August 25, 2016	Dallas	United States	Gexa Energy Pavilion	n/a	—N/a	—N/a
August 26, 2016	The Woodlands	United States	Cynthia Woods Mitchell Pavilion	n/a	—N/a	—N/a
August 27, 2016	Austin	United States	Austin360 Amphitheater	n/a	—N/a	—N/a
Leg 10: South America/Mexico 2016
South America
September 7, 2016	São Paulo	Brazil	Maximus Festival	n/a	20,558 / 30,000	$1,723,660
September 10, 2016	Buenos Aires	Argentina	Maximus Festival	n/a	26,222 / 30,000	$2,135,470
North America
October 15, 2016	Mexico City	Mexico	Knotfest	n/a	—N/a	—N/a
Leg 11: Asia 2016
November 4, 2016	Seoul	South Korea	Yes24 Live Hall	n/a	—N/a	—N/a
November 6, 2016	Tokyo	Japan	Knotfest	n/a	—N/a	—N/a

=== Cancelled or rescheduled shows ===
List of cancelled concerts, showing date, city, country, venue and reason for cancellation
Date	City	Country	Venue	Reason
Leg 1: North America 2015
January 27, 2015	Long Island	United States	Paramount Theatre	Winter Storm Juno
Leg 8: Europe 2015
November 16, 2015	Paris	France	Le Zénith	November 2015 Paris attacks
Leg 9: North America 2016 (with Slipknot)
July 21, 2016	Quebec	Canada	Centre Vidéotron	Undisclosed illness

== Lineup ==
- Marilyn Manson – vocals, guitar on "Mister Superstar", tambourine on "Killing Strangers"
- Tyler Bates – lead guitar (From the beginning of the tour, until April 11, 2015)
- Twiggy – bass guitar
- Paul Wiley – rhythm guitar; lead guitar (From April 24, 2015 onwards)
- Gil Sharone – drums
- Daniel Fox – percussion and keyboards (End Times tour and co-headlining tour with Of Mice and Men & Slipknot)

== Opening acts ==
North America – Winter leg

- Sadist
- Unlocking the Truth
- Hide
- Deap Vally
- Die Mannequin
- OURS

North America – Spring leg

- Knee High Fox
- Deap Vally
- Die Mannequin

North America – Autumn leg

- September Mourning
- Head Wound City

Europe – Winter leg

- New Years Day (EU mainland dates)
- Krokodil (UK dates only)
