= Twins of Evil Tour =

2012 concert tour by Rob Zombie and Marilyn Manson

Twins of Evil
- World tour by Rob Zombie and Marilyn Manson
- Promotional poster for the October 1 performance of the Twins of Evil Tour
- Location: United States; Europe
- Associated album: Hellbilly Deluxe 2 and Born Villain
- Start date: September 28, 2012
- End date: December 12, 2012
- Legs: 2
- No. of shows: 39 (planned); 36 (completed)

Rob Zombie and Marilyn Manson concert chronology
- Twins of Evil Tour
  (2012)
- Twins of Evil: The Second Coming Tour
  (2018)
Marilyn Manson tour chronology
- The High End of Low Tour
- (2009)
- Hey Cruel World... Tour
- (2012–13)
- Twins of Evil Tour
- (2012)
- Masters of Madness Tour
- (2013)

The Twins of Evil Tour was the first double-bill concert tour co-headlined by American rock bands Rob Zombie and Marilyn Manson. Launched in support of each band's respective full-length studio LPs, 2010's Hellbilly Deluxe 2 and 2012's Born Villain, the tour visited a mixture of amphitheaters, indoor arenas and outdoor stadiums from September 28, 2012, through December 12, 2012. There were also shows given at smaller, more intimate venues, such as New York City’s Hammerstein Ballroom. It was conceived as a follow-up tour for Zombie's Hellbilly Deluxe 2 World Tour. At the time, Marilyn Manson was engaged in their worldwide Hey Cruel World... Tour, thus Twins of Evil became a 'tour within a tour' for the band. It consisted of two legs, with dates in the United States and Europe.

The tour made headlines within the rock community due to a highly publicized altercation between the bands' respective lead vocalists. Despite this, both frontmen privately made amends, and Twins of Evil became a critically and commercially successful double bill touring franchise, spawning two sequel tours, 2018's "Twins of Evil: The Second Coming Tour" with special guest Deadly Apples and 2019's "Twins of Evil: Hell Never Dies Tour".

== Background and development ==
Following the conclusion of Rob Zombie's Hellbilly Deluxe 2 World Tour on May 26, 2012, Manson and Zombie underwent negotiations to launch a double bill tour to cover North America and Europe for the remainder of 2012. At the time, Manson was engaged in the worldwide Hey Cruel World... Tour in support of their 8th full-length studio LP, Born Villain, however, Manson was interested with the idea of touring with Zombie. Hence, the tour was conceived as a 'tour within a tour' for Hey Cruel World... Tour.

The tour began on September 28, 2012, in Phoenix, Arizona, at the first annual Desert Uprising Festival at Ashley Furniture Homestore Pavilion. The last show of the North American leg of the tour was on October 31, 2012, near Dallas. Marilyn Manson played in Latin America as part of his own Hey Cruel World... tour until the Twins of Evil tour moved to Europe on November 26, 2012. The tour concluded on December 12, 2012, in Bologna, Italy.

== Incidents ==
A feud began between Manson and Zombie early into the tour. The day after the October 11, 2012 performance at the Allstate Arena in Chicago, Manson took to the social networking service Twitter and posted, "Sorry to Chicago for not getting to play 'Beautiful People.' You can sing it in between Zombie songs, his band has already played it."

The row then escalated the next evening during the tour's engagement at the DTE Energy Music Theatre in Detroit, Michigan. Manson came to believe that Zombie had deliberately cut into his set time and launched into a tirade saying, "I'm sorry if you came to see Rob Zombie, and he can't come on, because I'm going to beat his ass ... twice ... three fucking times." Zombie responded during their set by yelling several obscenities directed at Manson. His band then performed their rendition of the song "School's Out" by Alice Cooper and dedicated it to "the only real shock rocker there ever was, Alice Cooper, not some punk-ass bitch."

Zombie also addressed the issue in the social networking service Facebook where he wrote:

"I don't get it. Christ, I've known some of his crew for 20 fucking years and some of his crew used work for me. It's all good. No one would fuck with someone's show. It is ridiculous ... Well, of course, I felt the need to respond to the 'kick my ass remark.' Who wouldn't? Although I wish I had kept it backstage and kept the fans out of it. It is all 4th grade fight after school nonsense of which I have never dealt with on tour before. Co-headlining tours always go smooth because everything is cut 50/50 and I mean everything. No one fucks with anyone's show. It is even fucking Steven. I've done co-headlining tours many times before and have had no troubles."

== Return to Hey Cruel World... Tour ==
Marilyn Manson continued on their Hey Cruel World... tour at the conclusion of the Twins of Evil tour, playing in Yekaterinburg, Russia, on December 15, 2012, and December 16, 2012. This tour concluded in Los Angeles, on February 21, 2013.

== Line-up ==
Marilyn Manson

- Marilyn Manson: lead vocals, rhythm guitar
- Twiggy Ramirez: lead guitar, backing vocals
- Fred Sablan: bass
- Jason Sutter: drums

Rob Zombie

- Rob Zombie: lead vocals
- John 5: guitars, backing vocals
- Piggy D.: bass, backing vocals
- Ginger Fish: drums

== Tour dates ==
List of concerts, showing date, city, country, and venue
Date	City	Country	Venue	Opening Act(s)	Attendance	Revenue
North America
28 September 2012	Phoenix	United States	Ashley Furniture HomeStore Pavilion	~~JDevil~~; DJ Starscream	—N/a	—N/a
29 September 2012	Las Vegas	United States	Mandalay Bay Events Center	~~JDevil~~; DJ Starscream	—N/a	—N/a
1 October 2012	West Valley City	United States	USANA Amphitheatre	~~JDevil~~; DJ Starscream	—N/a	—N/a
2 October 2012	Denver	United States	1stBank Center	~~JDevil~~; DJ Starscream	—N/a	—N/a
4 October 2012	Topeka	United States	Landon Arena	~~JDevil~~; DJ Starscream	—N/a	—N/a
5 October 2012	Maryland Heights	United States	Verizon Wireless Amphitheater	~~JDevil~~; DJ Starscream	—N/a	—N/a
8 October 2012	Lincoln	United States	Pershing Center	~~JDevil~~; DJ Starscream	—N/a	—N/a
9 October 2012	Mankato	United States	Verizon Wireless Center	~~JDevil~~; DJ Starscream	—N/a	—N/a
11 October 2012	Rosemont	United States	Allstate Arena	~~JDevil~~; DJ Starscream	—N/a	—N/a
12 October 2012	Clarkston	United States	DTE Energy Music Theatre	~~JDevil~~; DJ Starscream	—N/a	—N/a
13 October 2012	Bloomington	United States	U.S. Cellular Coliseum	~~JDevil~~; DJ Starscream	—N/a	—N/a
15 October 2012	Youngstown	United States	Covelli Centre	~~JDevil~~; DJ Starscream	—N/a	—N/a
16 October 2012	Rochester	United States	Main Street Armory	~~JDevil~~; DJ Starscream	—N/a	—N/a
17 October 2012	New York City	United States	Hammerstein Ballroom	~~JDevil~~; DJ Starscream	—N/a	—N/a
19 October 2012	Camden	United States	Susquehanna Bank Center	~~JDevil~~; DJ Starscream	—N/a	—N/a
20 October 2012	Uncasville	United States	Mohegan Sun Arena	~~JDevil~~; DJ Starscream	4,867 / 4,867	$192,247
21 October 2012	Manchester	United States	Verizon Wireless Arena	~~JDevil~~; DJ Starscream	—N/a	—N/a
23 October 2012	Glens Falls	United States	Glens Falls Civic Center	~~JDevil~~; DJ Starscream	—N/a	—N/a
25 October 2012	Atlanta	United States	Aaron's Amphitheatre at Lakewood	~~JDevil~~; DJ Starscream	—N/a	—N/a
27 October 2012	Tampa	United States	1-800-ASK-GARY Amphitheatre	~~JDevil~~; DJ Starscream	—N/a	—N/a
29 October 2012	Little Rock	United States	Barton Coliseum	~~JDevil~~; DJ Starscream	—N/a	—N/a
30 October 2012	Houston	United States	Reliant Arena	~~JDevil~~; DJ Starscream	—N/a	—N/a
31 October 2012	Grand Prairie	United States	Verizon Theatre at Grand Prairie	~~JDevil~~; DJ Starscream	—N/a	—N/a
Europe
26 November 2012	London	England	The O2 Arena	~~JDevil~~; DJ Starscream	9,592 / 11,816	$556,803
27 November 2012	Manchester	England	MEN Arena	~~JDevil~~; DJ Starscream	6,869 / 8,336	$384,970
28 November 2012	Glasgow	Scotland	Scottish Exhibition and Conference Centre	~~JDevil~~; DJ Starscream	—N/a	—N/a
29 November 2012	Birmingham	England	National Indoor Arena	~~JDevil~~; DJ Starscream	—N/a	—N/a
1 December 2012	Esch-sur-Alzette	Luxembourg	Rockhal	~~JDevil~~; DJ Starscream	—N/a	—N/a
2 December 2012	Bochum	Germany	RuhrCongress	~~JDevil~~; DJ Starscream	—N/a	—N/a
3 December 2012	Amsterdam	Netherlands	Heineken Music Hall	~~JDevil~~; DJ Starscream	—N/a	—N/a
5 December 2012	Stockholm	Sweden	Hovet	~~JDevil~~; DJ Starscream	—N/a	—N/a
6 December 2012	Copenhagen	Denmark	Valby-Hallen	~~JDevil~~; DJ Starscream	—N/a	—N/a
8 December 2012	Vienna	Austria	Wiener Stadthalle	~~JDevil~~; DJ Starscream	—N/a	—N/a
9 December 2012	Munich	Germany	Zenith	~~JDevil~~; DJ Starscream	—N/a	—N/a
11 December 2012	Basel	Switzerland	St. Jakobshalle	~~JDevil~~; DJ Starscream	—N/a	—N/a
12 December 2012	Bologna	Italy	Unipol Arena	~~JDevil~~; DJ Starscream	—N/a	—N/a

=== Cancelled or rescheduled shows ===
List of cancelled concerts, showing date, city, country, venue and reason for cancellation
Date	City	Country	Venue	Reason
Leg 1: North America 2012
6 October 2012	Little Rock	United States	Barton Coliseum	Cancelled
23 October 2012	Boston	United States	Agganis Arena	Cancelled
26 October 2012	Orlando	United States	Tinker Field	Cancelled
