= Masters of Madness Tour =

2013 concert tour by Alice Cooper and Marilyn Manson

Masters of Madness
- North American tour by Alice Cooper and Marilyn Manson
- Promotional poster for the Masters of Madness Tour
- Location: United States and Canada
- Associated album: Welcome 2 My Nightmare and Born Villain
- Start date: June 1, 2013
- End date: July 28, 2013
- Legs: 1
- No. of shows: 18 in North America
Marilyn Manson tour chronology
- Twins of Evil Tour
- (2012)
- Masters of Madness Tour
- (2013)
- The Hell Not Hallelujah Tour
- (2015–16)

The Masters of Madness Tour (also known as the Shock Therapy Tour) was the double bill North American concert tour co-headlined by American rock bands Alice Cooper and Marilyn Manson. Launched in support of Cooper's 26th full-length studio LP, 2011's Welcome 2 My Nightmare and Manson's 8th full-length studio LP, 2012's Born Villain, the tour visited stadiums from June 1, 2013 through July 7, 2013.

== Tour ==
Prior to the commencement of the tour, Manson performed two warm up shows as part of the tour without the company of Cooper, the first was in San Diego, and the second was in Tempe, on May 29, 2013, and May 30, 2013, respectively. Manson and Cooper kicked off their co-headlined tour on June 1, 2013, at the Isleta Amphitheater in Albuquerque. The opening act for this tour was a Hollywood, CA band, Picture Me Broken. Its lead singer, Layla 'Brooklyn' Allman is the daughter of Gregg Allman. The band's drummer (Shaun Foist) went on to become the drummer for alternative rock band, Breaking Benjamin.

== Line-up ==
Line-up
Role	Artist
Co-headlining	Alice Cooper
Co-headlining	Marilyn Manson
Opening act	Picture Me Broken

== Set List ==
- Alice Cooper:
1. "Hello Hooray"
2. "House of Fire"
3. "No More Mr. Nice Guy"
4. "Billion Dollar Babies"
5. "I'll Bite Your Face Off"
6. "Is It My Body"
7. "Under My Wheels"
8. "Hey Stoopid"
9. "Poison"
10. "Dirty Diamonds"
11. "Welcome to My Nightmare"
12. "Go to Hell"
13. "Feed My Frankenstein"
14. "Ballad of Dwight Fry"
15. "I Love the Dead"
16. "School's Out"

Encore:

1. "I'm Eighteen"
- Marilyn Manson:
1. "Angel With the Scabbed Wings"
2. "Disposable Teens"
3. "No Reflection"
4. "The Dope Show"
5. "Rock is Dead"
6. "Great Big White World"
7. "Personal Jesus"
8. "mOBSCENE"
9. "Sweet Dreams (Are Made of This)"
10. "This is the New Shit"
11. "Antichrist Superstar"
12. "The Beautiful People"

== Tour dates ==
List of concerts, showing date, city, country, and venue
Date	City	Country	Venue	Opening Act(s)	Attendance	Revenue
North America
June 1, 2013	Albuquerque	United States	Isleta Amphitheater	Picture Me Broken	—N/a	—N/a
June 3, 2013	Morrison	United States	Red Rocks Amphitheatre	Picture Me Broken	—N/a	—N/a
June 4, 2013	West Valley City	United States	USANA Amphitheatre	Picture Me Broken	—N/a	—N/a
June 6, 2013	Los Angeles	United States	Gibson Amphitheatre	Picture Me Broken	—N/a	—N/a
June 7, 2013	Tucson	United States	AVA Amphitheater	Picture Me Broken	—N/a	—N/a
June 8, 2013	El Paso	United States	Don Haskins Center	Picture Me Broken	—N/a	—N/a
June 10, 2013	Grand Prairie	United States	Verizon Theatre at Grand Prairie	Picture Me Broken	2,990 / 4,010	$136,372
June 13, 2013	Cleveland	United States	Jacobs Pavilion	Picture Me Broken	—N/a	—N/a
June 14, 2013	Buffalo	United States	Buffalo Outer Harbor Site	Picture Me Broken	—N/a	—N/a
June 15, 2013	Montebello	Canada	Marina Montebello	Picture Me Broken	—N/a	—N/a
June 17, 2013	Columbia	United States	Merriweather Post Pavilion	Picture Me Broken	—N/a	—N/a
June 18, 2013	Reading	United States	Sovereign Center	Picture Me Broken	3,184 / 4,666	$144,559
June 20, 2013	Gilford	United States	Meadowbrook U.S. Cellular Pavilion	Picture Me Broken	2,053 / 5,930	$85,903
June 21, 2013	Uncasville	United States	Mohegan Sun Arena	Picture Me Broken	3,007 / 3,735	$92,120
June 23, 2013	Pittsburgh	United States	Stage AE	Picture Me Broken	—N/a	—N/a
June 25, 2013	St. Charles	United States	Family Arena	Picture Me Broken	—N/a	—N/a
June 27, 2013	Bonner Springs	United States	Cricket Wireless Amphitheater	Picture Me Broken	—N/a	—N/a
June 28, 2013	Rockford	United States	BMO Harris Bank Center	Picture Me Broken	—N/a	—N/a
