= Slo-Mo-Tion =

Single by Marilyn Manson

from the album Born Villain
- Released: August 13, 2012
- Genre: Glam rock; industrial rock
- Length: 4:24
- Label: Cooking Vinyl; Hell, etc.
- Songwriters: Marilyn Manson; Twiggy Ramirez; Fred Sablan; Chris Vrenna
- Producers: Marilyn Manson; Chris Vrenna

Marilyn Manson singles chronology
"No Reflection" (2012)	"Slo-Mo-Tion" (2012)	"Third Day of a Seven Day Binge" (2014)

"Slo-Mo-Tion" is a song by American rock band Marilyn Manson. The song serves as the second single and is also the fifth track from their eighth full-length studio album Born Villain. The title of the song was revealed when Marilyn Manson appeared on That Metal Show in December 2011. The song was first released on May 1, 2012 along with the Born Villain album, and was officially released as the album's second single worldwide August 13, 2012. An EP of remixes was released in Canada via Dine Alone Records on November 6, 2012.

== Music video ==
On June 27, 2012, Manson announced via his Facebook page that a music video for the song was in the making. The status was uploaded via mobile, reading, "Shooting Slo-Mo-tion. --MM". On August 10, 2012, Manson updated his Facebook and Twitter with four new images, one which included the caption, "Just finished the slo-mo-tion moving picture show.", suggesting that the music video was now complete.

The music video was released online August 21, 2012, and was directed by Marilyn Manson himself. The video features Manson and Twiggy Ramirez, and a cameo from Eastbound & Down's Steve Little. The video showcases Manson singing into the camera while wearing different outfits, wearing face paint, surrounded by various people in some scenes which includes Steve Little in prosthetic breasts, and topless women. Also, staying true with the title, the music video is filled with slow motion effects. The video cuts out near the end as Manson sings "this is my beautiful show and everything is shot..." to a scene with Manson on a rooftop holding a gun, as he prepares to fire it into an intersection at a cyclist below.

A review on UltimateGuitar.com described the music video as "visually dynamic", stating "Manson is captured in slow motion doing a variety of things, from shooting a gun to spitting a neon colored substance out of his mouth." The review concludes stating, "Despite the song's title, the video is quite a lot to take in, at five and a half minutes long." Kory Grow of Spin magazine wrote "it's as creepy as you'd expect it to be: putrid neon paint, Manson spittling, prosthetic breasts and, of course, Manson saying the words "slow motion" really slowly. But those aren't the really shocking parts. There's a scene where he's holding a machine gun in front of a window with red lettering on it that spells out "rape." And the video ends with him wearing a long leather coat and a partial gasmask, as he sits atop a building pointing his gun at someone riding by on a bicycle."

== Track listings ==
Digital download

1. "Slo-Mo-Tion" (Album Version) – 4:24
2. "Slo-Mo-Tion" (Dirtyphonics Remix) – 5:24

Promo single

1. "Slo-Mo-Tion" (Radio Edit) – 3:30
2. "Slo-Mo-Tion" (Dirtyphonics Remix) – 5:25
3. "Slo-Mo-Tion" (Album Version) – 4:21
4. "Slo-Mo-Tion" (Instrumental Version) – 4:13

Remix EP

1. "Slo-Mo-Tion" (Proxy Remix) – 3:46
2. "Slo-Mo-Tion" (Sandwell District Remix) – 6:41
3. "Slo-Mo-Tion" (Dirtyphonics Remix) – 5:24
4. "Slo-Mo-Tion" (Proxy Dub Remix) – 3:46
5. "Slo-Mo-Tion" (Sandwell District Dub Remix) – 6:43
6. "Slo-Mo-Tion" (Album Version) – 4:24

Sandwell District Remixes

1. "Slo-Mo-Tion (Sandwell District Remix)- 6:41
2. "Slo-Mo-Tion (Samdwell District Dub Remix)- 6:43

== Appearances ==
The song was used on the American version of the television dance competition, So You Think You Can Dance.

== Charts ==
Chart (2013)	Peak position
Canadian Rock Chart	43
