= RockOut Fest =

RockOut Fest (2014–present) Maquinaria Festival (2010–2012)
- Begins: October 9, 2010
- Locations: Santiago, Chile 2010, 2011, 2012, 2014, 2016, 2017; São Paulo, Brazil 2008, 2009; Buenos Aires, Argentina 2012, 2016; Mexico City, Mexico 2012; Guadalajara, Mexico 2012
- Years active: 7
- Inaugurated: October 9, 2010; 16 years ago
- Most recent: September 3 (Santiago)

RockOut Fest (formerly called Maquinaria Festival) is a music festival of different styles but mainly rock, born in São Paulo in 2008. After two versions there, the Chilean producer Transistor bought and exported the brand to Chile to do it October 9, 2010, at the Club Hípico in Santiago de Chile, with bands like Queens of the Stone Age, Incubus, Linkin Park and Pixies as headliners, as well as sideshows with Rage Against the Machine, The Mars Volta and Suicidal Tendencies. After the first successful release, a second version was released in 2011 with Faith No More, Megadeth, Alice In Chains, Down, Chris Cornell, Stone Temple Pilots, Snoop Dogg, Sonic Youth, Primus and Damian Marley This time as headliners on 12 and 13 November.

After two versions, the Transistor producer decided to change the venue for 2012, to Club de Campo Las Vizcachas with camping including and signs alliances with producers in Argentina and Mexico to make local versions, with similar line-up, between 1 and November 11, 2012. In Mexico City (1, 2 and 3), Guadalajara (3 and 4), Buenos Aires (8 and 9) to finish in Santiago de Chile on November 10–11. Marilyn Manson, Slayer, The Prodigy, and Calle 13 are headliners in all countries along with names like Deftones (except Buenos Aires), Gogol Bordello, Apollo, Mastodon, Stone Sour, Cavalera Conspiracy, Slash (Chile only) and Kiss (Exclusive to Chile).

In August 2014, the Transistor company changed the name of Maquinaria Festival to RockOut Fest, making its first edition only in Santiago de Chile. It has been confirmed to the second edition for September 2016 and the third for November 2017.

== Venues ==
Maquinaria Festival
Date	Venue	Attendance
9 de octubre, 2010	Club Hípico	
11 de octubre, 2010*	Bicentenario de La Florida Stadium	
12 y 13 de noviembre, 2011	Club Hípico	100.000
10 y 11 de noviembre, 2012	Club de Campo Las Vizcachas	70.000

* This version was made as Sideshow because the artists initially performed at the festival but in the end played two days later

RockOut Fest
Fecha	Lugar	Asistencia
6 de diciembre, 2014	Espacio Broadway	
3 de septiembre, 2016	Santa Laura Stadium	30.000
11 de noviembre, 2017	Estadio Nacional Velodrome	

=== Maquinaria Festival Chile 2010 ===
Saturday, October 9
Green Stage	Red Stage	Blue Stage
Linkin Park	Incubus	Cansei de Ser Sexy
Queens of the Stone Age	Pixies	Aeroplane
Cavalera Conspiracy	Yo la Tengo	Erol Alkan
Alain Johannes	El Otro Yo	Reactable Live
Pedro Piedra	Hoppo!	DJ Bitman
	Beto Cuevas	Rahzel
		Movimiento Original
		Como Asesinar a Felipes
		Mátenlo

SideShow
Tuesday, October 11
Rage Against the Machine
Suicidal Tendencies
The Mars Volta

=== Maquinaria Festival Chile 2011 ===
Saturday, November 12
Claro-Sony Ericsson Stage	Transistor Stage	Lenovo Stage
Faith No More	Megadeth	Matias Aguayo
Alice in Chains	Chris Cornell	Bag Raiders
Black Rebel Motorcycle Club	Down	Matanza
Pepper	Loaded	Vicarious Bliss
		The Magician
		Members of Morphine and Jeremy Lyons
		Alain Johannes
		The Black Angels
		Perrosky
		The Ganjas

Sunday, November 13
Claro-Sony Ericsson Stage	Transistor Stage	Lenovo Stage
Snoop Dogg	Stone Temple Pilots	Tiga
Damian Marley	Primus	Crystal Castles
Violadores del Verso	Sonic Youth	Gui Boratto
Movimiento Original	Miyavi	James Murphy
		Ellen Allien
		Soja
		Inspiral Carpets
		Francisca Valenzuela
		Gepe
		Luis Flores

=== Maquinaria Festival Chile 2012 ===
Saturday, 10 November 10
Hp/Windows Stage	Maquinaria Stage	Pepsi Stage	Transistor Stage
Slayer	Kiss	Marky Ramone	Mixhell
Stone Sour	Marilyn Manson	Criminal	Chino Moreno (Dj Set)
Hielo Negro	Mastodon	Cavalera Conspiracy	Los Peores de Chile
		Yajaira	Como Asesinar a Felipes
		República	Project 46

Sunday, November 11
Hp/Windows Stage	Maquinaria Stage	Pepsi Stage	Transistor Stage
The Prodigy		Aguaturbia	Knife Party
Deftones	Calle 13	Jorge Gonzales	Nero (Dj Set)
Gogol Bordello	Slash	Los Tres	Raff vs Bitman
Kita	Pánico	Camila Moreno	Prefiero Fernandez
		Villa Cariño	The Suicide Bitches

=== RockOut Fest Chile 2014 ===
Saturday, December 6
Monster Stage	Transistor Stage	Escudo Stage
Primus	Extremoduro	Dos Minutos
Fantômas	Devo	Los Peores de Chile
Melvins	Blind Melon	Hielo Negro
Helmet	Thurston Moore Band	Los Morton
	Como Asesinar Felipes	Rama
		Machuca

=== RockOut Fest Chile 2016 ===
Saturday, September 3
Monster Stage	Transistor Stage
The Offspring	Rammstein
Dead Kennedys	Meshuggah
Anti-Flag	Hellyeah
Valium	All Tomorrows

=== RockOut Fest Chile 2017 ===
Saturday, November 11
Opeth
Bad Religion
Divididos
Attaque 77
Zakk Sabbath
Eterna Inocencia
Kuervos del Sur
Tenemos Explosivos
