= Born Villain =

Studio album by Marilyn Manson
- Released: April 25, 2012
- Recorded: January 2010 – November 2011
- Studio: Zane-A-Due: (California)
- Genres: Industrial rock; alternative metal
- Length: 63:25
- Labels: Cooking Vinyl; Hell, etc.
- Producers: Marilyn Manson; Chris Vrenna

Marilyn Manson chronology
The High End of Low (2009)	Born Villain (2012)	The Pale Emperor (2015)

Singles from Born Villain
- 1. "No Reflection" Released: March 13, 2012; 2. "Slo-Mo-Tion" Released: August 13, 2012

Born Villain is the eighth studio album by American rock band Marilyn Manson. It was released on April 25, 2012, by Cooking Vinyl and Marilyn Manson's independent record label Hell, etc. It was the band's first release since the departure of Ginger Fish, who had been their drummer since 1995, and was their only album to feature Fred Sablan. The record was co-produced by the band's eponymous vocalist alongside former Nine Inch Nails member Chris Vrenna, who left shortly after its completion to focus on other production work.

Manson was more involved in the album's composition than he was on preceding releases. Primarily an industrial rock and alternative metal record, it contains some of the heaviest material the band had ever recorded. A cover version of Carly Simon's "You're So Vain" featuring Johnny Depp was included as a bonus track on all editions of the record. The album received mixed reviews from music critics, with several publications considering it to be a comeback for the band, while others were critical of its heaviness and violent lyrical content. It became the band's seventh top ten studio album on the Billboard 200, and also topped Billboard's Independent Albums and Top Hard Rock Albums charts.

The first single, "No Reflection", earned the band their fourth Grammy Award nomination, and went on to become their best-performing single on the US Mainstream Rock Chart since their cover of "Personal Jesus" in 2004. "Slo-Mo-Tion" was issued as its second and final single, although a music video was later released for "Hey, Cruel World...". The album was preceded by a surrealist short film, also titled Born Villain. They toured extensively to support the record; the "Hey Cruel World... Tour" was interspersed by co-headlining tours with Rob Zombie ("Twins of Evil") and Alice Cooper ("Masters of Madness").

== Background and recording ==
On December 3, 2009, it was announced that Marilyn Manson had parted ways with their long-time record label Interscope. That same day, the band confirmed that they had been composing new material while touring in support of their previous studio album, The High End of Low (2009). The band's eponymous vocalist also suggested that a series of special one-off concerts were in development for the near future. These performances would see each album from Manson's triptych of albums (Holy Wood, Mechanical Animals and Antichrist Superstar) being played in its entirety over three different nights in the one venue which never materialized. On January 12, 2010, Chris Vrenna said that the band were "talking and coming up with concepts" for an upcoming studio album. Two weeks later, Manson confirmed on the band's Myspace profile that "the new album is officially in motion".

Manson confirmed during his appearance at the 2010 Revolver Golden Gods Awards in April that the band had recorded 13 songs, and also expressed an interest in releasing the record in a different way from previous ones. Fred Sablan – guitarist for Twiggy's side-project Goon Moon – joined the band in July, and in October Twiggy described the upcoming album as being "almost done", saying: "It's our best record yet. I mean, everyone always says that, but I think this is our best work so far. It's kind of like a little more of a punk rock Mechanical Animals, without sounding too pretentious." Manson attested that its lyrical content would be "more romantic" yet "self-abusive", and described its sonic elements as being "suicide death metal".

In November, it was announced that the band had signed a joint-venture deal with London-based indie label Cooking Vinyl. As part of the deal, the band would retain creative control over its artistic direction, with the band and label sharing profits equally after the label recouped costs associated with marketing, promotion and distribution. Ginger Fish, the band's drummer since 1995, quit in February 2011, explaining that he "decided to step down as a member of Marilyn Manson and see where my life, and the knowledge of my availability cares to take me. I can't stand by to watch opportunities pass me by simply because the knowledge of my availability wasn't clearly expressed by me." By the end of the year, Vrenna had also departed the group, to focus on other production work, whilst indicating that the band's eighth studio album was "largely completed".

== Composition and style ==
Manson has referred to Born Villain as the band's "grandest concept record". He has said its title was inspired by the controversy which surrounded the band after the 1999 Columbine High School massacre, when elements of the mainstream media falsely accused the band of influencing its perpetrators. The title also references the nature versus nurture argument, with Manson elaborating to CNN: "In any story, the villain is the catalyst. The hero's not a person who will bend the rules or show the cracks in his armor. He's one-dimensional intentionally, but the villain is the person who owns up to what he is and stands by it. He'll do things that are sometimes morally questionable, but he does it because it's his nature to do it, and it never fluctuates."

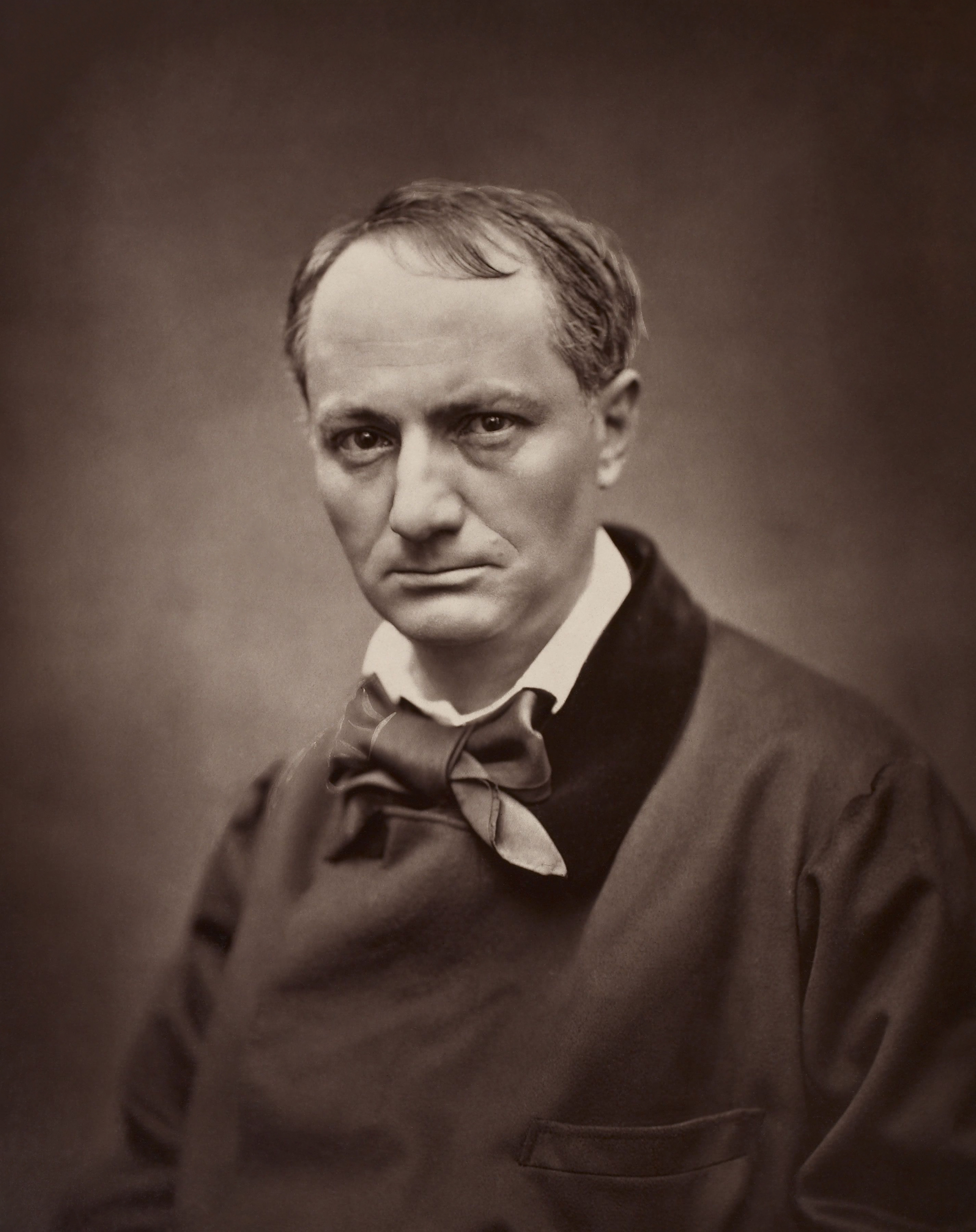
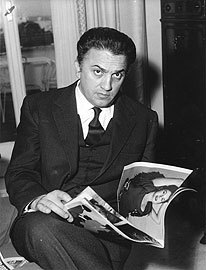
Born Villain references the work of Charles Baudelaire (left) and Federico Fellini (right).

"Overneath the Path of Misery"
"Overneath the Path of Misery", as it appeared on the album. This audio sample contains a portion of the song's final chorus.

When writing its lyrics, the vocalist found recurring themes of guns and flowers emerging throughout his work. He indicated that this stems from his father serving in the US Armed Forces during the Vietnam War, as well as the flower power movement. "Pistol Whipped" uses wordplay to liken phytotomy with sexual violence, while the title of "The Flowers of Evil" was inspired by Charles Baudelaire's poetry collection Les Fleurs du mal. Numerous other works are also referenced, including Federico Fellini's 1968 film Spirits of the Dead (itself based on the short story "Never Bet the Devil Your Head" by Edgar Allan Poe) and Greek mythology. "Overneath the Path of Misery" begins with the vocalist reciting part of the "Tomorrow and tomorrow and tomorrow" soliloquy from William Shakespeare's Macbeth. Manson indicated that he reinterpreted the soliloquy's intent to being a statement of empowerment, as opposed to one of desolation. Its lyrics go on to allude to various aspects found in Roman Polanski's 1971 film version of the play.

The frontman was more involved in the composition of Born Villain than he was for preceding records. Manson has said that this is a result of him beginning the project with a different mindset from that of his chief collaborator, Twiggy. He said he developed a "clear idea" of the album's direction early in its writing stages, which he was reluctant to share with other members of the band. He worked on the album in a minimally decorated apartment located above a liquor store in Downtown Los Angeles, which was once owned by actor Billy Zane and was the site where Manson created his first painting in 1996. The album contains seven songs which feature the vocalist as a composer, including three where he is listed as the sole writer. At the time of the album's release, Manson distanced himself from the approach he took when creating previous albums, explaining: "On the last two records I made, I was trying to make people feel what I was feeling—which wasn't a good idea, because I was feeling like shit. Check mark number one: don't make records that make people feel bad."

The album is primarily an industrial rock and alternative metal record, and features some of the heaviest material the band has ever recorded. It also contains songs which have been ascribed to various sub-genres, such as punk rock, gothic rock, EBM, industrial, glam rock and blues. Manson has said that the album is a departure from the band's previous records, and that it was inspired by the work of acts he listened to before forming Marilyn Manson: namely Killing Joke, Joy Division, Revolting Cocks, Bauhaus and The Birthday Party. He also revealed that the band employed the hypersonic effect during recording, whereby they altered the frequencies of sound effects to beyond the threshold of conscious human hearing. He explained that this was done to "meddle with people's reactions" to the album—and hoped it would make listeners feel nauseous.

== Release and artwork ==
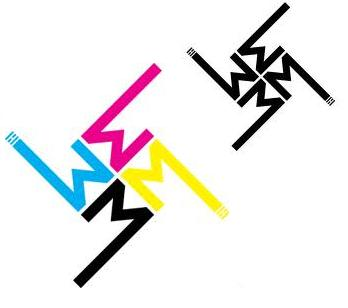
The band logo for Born Villain

In May 2010, the band's website underwent a complete overhaul, incorporating a new logo along with a clip of a previously unreleased song. The CMYK coloring was also notable with regard to an acrostic which appeared in a journal entry accompanying the site changes, spelling out the words "Christianity Manufactures Yesterday's Killers". The album's title was revealed in September 2011. That same month, Manson and Twiggy attended the opening of artist Nick Kushner's exhibition at the Studio Servitu Gallery in LA, where the upcoming album was played in its entirety. LA Weekly attended the event and confirmed the upcoming album would be released in 2012.

Born Villain was released worldwide from April 30, with a cover of Carly Simon's "You're So Vain" included on all editions as a bonus track. This cover was recorded after the album had been completed, and features Johnny Depp performing guitar. The pair were introduced when Manson appeared as an extra on 21 Jump Street when he was 19, although "You're So Vain" is their first musical collaboration. The cover originated from a jam session, with Manson explaining that they "started playing old blues songs and I said, 'My record's done, but we should really do a song to add to the end of it, as if it were a movie.'" He described the cover's placement on the album as: "It's like the movie's over, and this is playing at the end title credits." It was later included on the soundtrack to the documentary West of Memphis. Dean Karr, who served as the photographer on Manson's cover shoot for the March 2012 issue of Revolver, was commissioned to create the album's cover art. He had previously worked on the artwork accompanying Antichrist Superstar. However, the cover image would later be revealed to be the work of photographer Lindsay Usich, with Karr's photography being used for the album's first single, "No Reflection".

== Promotion and singles ==
Born Villain received its inaugural screening at the Silent Theater in Los Angeles on August 28, 2011. Contrary to media reports that the project would be a "making-of" video documenting the album's recording, it was a surrealist short film directed by Shia LaBeouf, and was inspired by Alejandro Jodorowsky's The Holy Mountain and Salvador Dalí and Luis Buñuel's 1929 silent film Un Chien Andalou. The pair met at a Kills concert, after which LaBeouf screened Maniac – his directorial collaboration with rappers Kid Cudi and Cage – and then offered to direct the band's next music video. A coffee table book of photographs, entitled Campaign, was released concomitantly with the film. The book, which was bundled with a DVD of the film, was created by LaBeouf and photographer Karolyn Pho, and consists of images of various locations in LA graffiti-tagged with handbills of the film's artwork. It was released exclusively through the Hollywood outlet of Hennessey & Ingalls, where Manson and LaBeouf hosted a private screening and book signing on September 1.

The album was preceded by "No Reflection", which was leaked by Manson to KROQ-FM on March 7, 2012. Cooking Vinyl CEO Martin Goldschmidt called the leak a "masterstroke", saying "we had all these exclusives lined up around the world, and then Manson blew them all. [...] We're already getting more radio play than the whole of the last record." The song spent fourteen weeks on the Billboard Mainstream Rock Chart, peaking at number twenty-six, making it the band's best-performing single there since "Personal Jesus" in 2004. Its music video, which was directed by Lukas Ettlin and starred Roxane Mesquida of Rubber, premiered on April 4 on VEVO. On Record Store Day, a limited edition 7" white vinyl for the song was released exclusively in Europe.

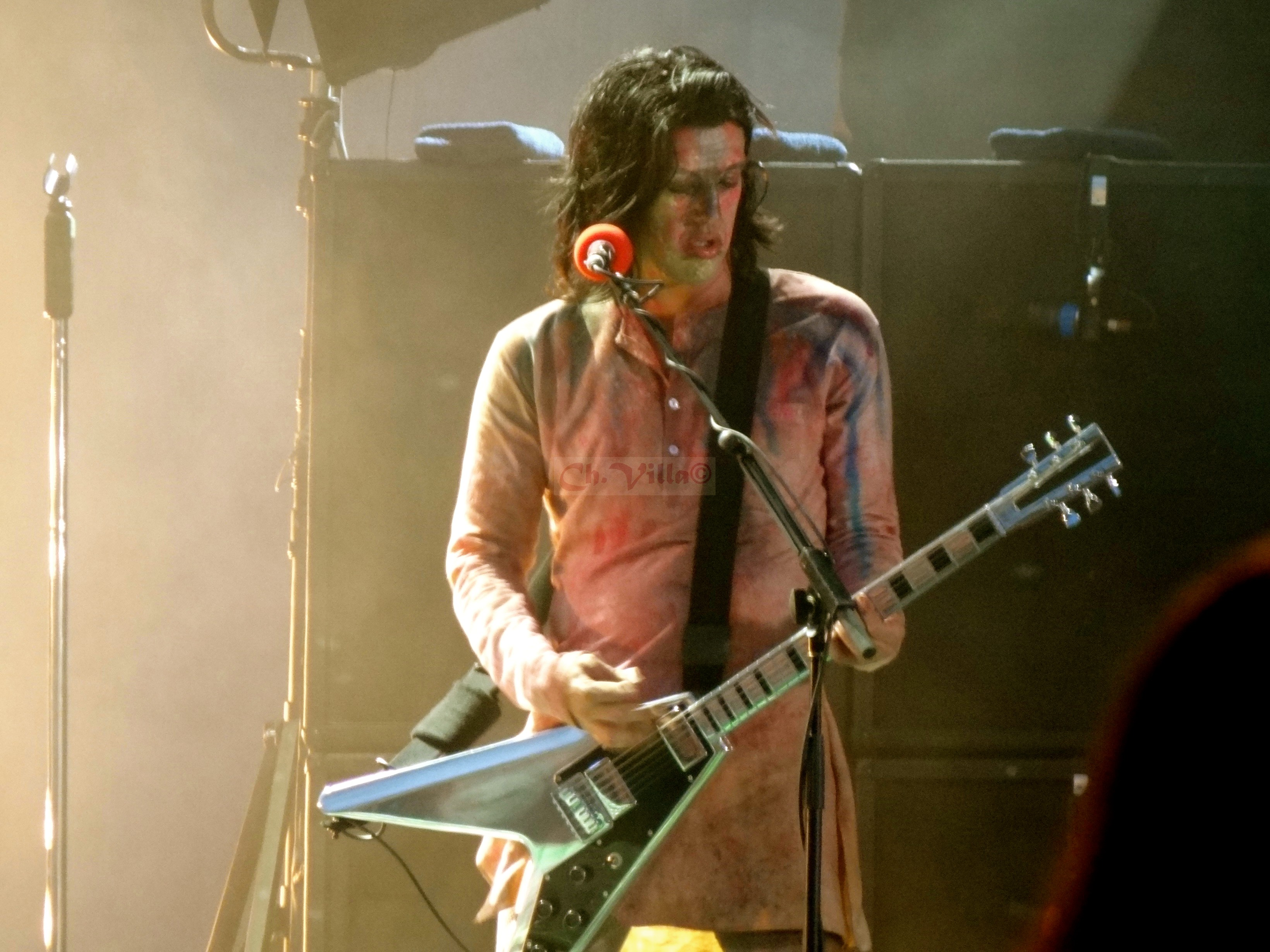
Twiggy performing during the "Hey Cruel World... Tour"

The band performed at the 2012 Revolver Golden Gods Awards, where they were joined on-stage by Depp and The Pretty Reckless singer Taylor Momsen for "Sweet Dreams (Are Made of This)" and "The Beautiful People". A video for "Slo-Mo-Tion" was released on August 21. It was directed by Manson and featured a cameo appearance from Eastbound & Down actor Steve Little. This was followed on September 28 with a video for "Hey, Cruel World...". Directed by Tim Mattia for AmpRockTV, it contains backstage and live performance footage from concerts in Milan, Brixton and Los Angeles. A remix EP for "Slo-Mo-Tion" was released on November 5.

The "Hey Cruel World... Tour" began at the end of April, which was interspersed with two co-headlining tours: "Twins of Evil" with Rob Zombie and "Masters of Madness" with Alice Cooper. The former tour received significant media attention when a feud developed between Manson and Zombie, culminating in a series of on-stage insults. It began after Manson apologized to the audience at Chicago's Allstate Arena on Twitter for not performing "The Beautiful People", and instructed the audience to "sing it in between Zombie songs, his band has already played it"—a reference to Zombie's band containing two former members of Marilyn Manson: John 5 and Ginger Fish. The row escalated in Clarkston when Manson accused Zombie of deliberately cutting into his set time. Zombie responded during his set by yelling obscenities at Manson.

== Critical reception ==
Professional ratings
Aggregate scores
Source	Rating
Metacritic	59/100
Review scores
Source	Rating
AllMusic	2.5/5 stars
Billboard	78/100
Classic Rock	8/10
Drowned in Sound	4/10
The Independent	1/5 stars
Kerrang!	3/5 stars
Loudwire	4.5/5 stars
NME	6/10
PopMatters	4/10
Spin	5/10

Upon its release, the album was met with mixed reviews. At Metacritic, which assigns a normalized rating out of 100 to reviews from mainstream critics, the album received an average score 59, based on 10 reviews, which indicates "generally mixed or average reviews". It also holds an aggregate score of 5.0 out of 10 at AnyDecentMusic?, based on 11 reviews.

Several reviews considered Born Villain to be a comeback for the band. Matthew Horton of Virgin Media described it as "a new step forward, bristling with a vitality that Manson has no right to still have in his locker this far down the line." Similarly, Kill Hipsters called it "one hell of a comeback for a guy everyone–including myself–thought was well and truly dead and gone." Loudwire's Graham Hartmann praised the album as a whole, as did Rick Florino of Artistdirect, who said: "From top to bottom, it's Manson's most vicious and vibrant effort since Antichrist Superstar. Make no mistake about it: this is Manson at his best." Bloody Disgusting ranked it among the band's best work.

The band received acclaim for the quality of their songwriting. Fred Thomas of AllMusic complimented them for disposing of the introspective material which appeared on prior albums and choosing to "accentuate all the throbbing rhythms, metallic guitars and bilious disgust that defined the band's best work." He went on to suggest that Born Villain could pave the way for future releases. Reviewing for Classic Rock, Mick Farren – who was cynical of the hype the album was receiving – said "to my delight as a closet fan, Born Villain turns out to be little short of excellent", praising its emphasis on "bone-crunching rhythm". A review for Blabbermouth said that several tracks were likely to be considered classics among the band's discography. The Ottawa Sun complimented the album's lyrical themes, saying that it saw Manson "[rising] like the slasher-flick antihero he deserves to be." Mayer Nissim of Digital Spy praised the album for being more fun than previous work, while Gary Graff from Billboard applauded it for containing a wide variety of moods and styles.

The record also received some mixed reviews. The Arts Desk disliked the heavier material on the album, although they praised its glam rock-influenced songs. Stephen Dalton of The National complimented its more aggressive and humorous tracks, but said the album was "not quite the knockout blow needed to regain his title as the world heavyweight champion of shock rock." British magazine Rock Sound complained that the record contained too many long introductions, which they said disrupted its fluidity. Writing for NME, Hamish MacBain defined the album as being better than average, saying there was "just a lack of magic, a lack of something special going on. It's not bad. It's not good." Tom Bryant from Kerrang! was also unimpressed, although he praised "Breaking the Same Old Ground" as an emotional climax for the record, writing: "For a man who's spent so long appearing not to be human, the deliverance of naked soul makes for a nice twist. Perhaps this should be where his future lies?"

Andy Gill of The Independent awarded Born Villain their lowest rating of one star out of five. He criticized Manson's lyrics as being hate-filled and suggested: "If he tried to find something he liked, he might actually make something worth listening to." Conversely, a review by Simon Price for that publication's sister edition, The Independent on Sunday, gave the album their top score of five stars, saying that it "features some of his finest lyrics yet and, musically, it often approaches the heyday of Holy Wood and Mechanical Animals. It is, then, something approaching the 'stunning return to form' of rock-crit cliché."

=== Accolades ===
"No Reflection" earned the band their fourth Grammy Award nomination, for Best Hard Rock/Metal Performance. The song's music video won the award for 'Rock Video of the Year' at the 2012 Loudwire Music Awards, while the song itself placed third in their poll for 'Rock Song'. Born Villain also won the award for 'Rock Album of the Year', and was nominated for 'Album of the Year' at the 2013 Revolver Golden Gods Awards. It also appeared on multiple 'best albums of 2012' lists, including ones for Kerrang! and Loudwire.

== Commercial performance ==
Born Villain became the band's seventh top ten studio album on the Billboard 200, after it debuted at number ten with first week sales of over 39,000 copies. The album also peaked at number three on Top Rock Albums, number two on Top Alternative Albums, and at number one on both the Top Hard Rock Albums and Independent Albums charts. As of November 2014, it has sold over 122,000 copies in the US.

Internationally, the album peaked within the top twenty of numerous territories. It debuted at number two in Switzerland, where it was held off the top spot by Norah Jones' Little Broken Hearts. In France, the record peaked at number eight, and has sold over 15,000 copies there as of November 2014. Born Villain became the band's fourth top ten studio album in Germany, when it debuted at number five. In the United Kingdom, it debuted at number fourteen – five places higher than The High End of Low – selling almost 7,000 copies on its first week. The album spent two weeks at number one on the UK Rock Albums Chart. In Japan, it sold 5,825 copies to debut at number eighteen.

== Track listing ==
All lyrics are written by Marilyn Manson, except "You're So Vain" by Carly Simon.

Born Villain – Standard edition
No.	Title	Music	Length
1.	"Hey, Cruel World..."	Twiggy; Chris Vrenna	3:44
2.	"No Reflection"	Manson; Twiggy; Vrenna	4:36
3.	"Pistol Whipped"	Manson	4:10
4.	"Overneath the Path of Misery"	Manson; Twiggy; Vrenna	5:18
5.	"Slo-Mo-Tion"	Manson; Fred Sablan; Twiggy; Vrenna	4:24
6.	"The Gardener"	Twiggy; Vrenna	4:39
7.	"The Flowers of Evil"	Twiggy; Vrenna	5:19
8.	"Children of Cain"	Manson	5:17
9.	"Disengaged"	Manson	3:25
10.	"Lay Down Your Goddamn Arms"	Twiggy; Vrenna	4:13
11.	"Murderers Are Getting Prettier Every Day"	Twiggy; Vrenna	4:18
12.	"Born Villain"	Manson; Twiggy; Vrenna	5:26
13.	"Breaking the Same Old Ground"	Twiggy; Vrenna	4:27
Total length:			59:23

Born Villain – International bonus track
No.	Title	Length
14.	"You're So Vain" (Carly Simon cover; featuring Johnny Depp)	4:02
Total length:		63:25

Born Villain – Japanese bonus track
No.	Title	Length
15.	"No Reflection" (Radio Edit)	3:31
Total length:		66:56

Born Villain – iTunes edition
No.	Title	Length
15.	"No Reflection" (Music Video)	3:29
Total length:		66:54

== Personnel ==
Credits adapted from the liner notes of Born Villain.

Marilyn Manson

- Marilyn Manson – vocals, rhythm guitar, keyboards
- Twiggy Ramirez – lead guitar, bass, keyboards
- Fred Sablan – rhythm guitar, bass
- Chris Vrenna – drums, programming, percussion, keyboards, synthesizers

Additional musicians

- Johnny Depp – guitar, drums ("You're So Vain")
- Jason Sutter – drums ("You're So Vain")
- Bruce Witkin – guitars, bass, keyboards ("You're So Vain")

Technical

- Marilyn Manson – lyricist, composer, production, art direction and design
- Chris Vrenna – production
- Johnny Depp – production ("You're So Vain")
- Bruce Witkin – recording, production ("You're So Vain")
- Agata Alexander – logo art
- Tom Baker – mastering
- Emma Banks – booking agent for Creative Artists Agency
- Sean Beavan – mixing
- Tony Ciulla – management
- Steve Cox – art direction and design
- Chris Dalston – booking agent for CAA
- Michelle Jubelirer – legal
- Mike Riley – engineer
- Rick Roskin – booking agent for CAA
- Lindsay Usich – photography
- Keenan Wyatt – recording ("You're So Vain")

== Charts ==
=== Weekly charts ===
Chart (2012)	Peak position
Australian Albums (ARIA)	16
Austrian Albums (Ö3 Austria)	4
Belgian Albums (Ultratop Flanders)	32
Belgian Albums (Ultratop Wallonia)	15
Canadian Albums (Billboard)	8
Croatian Albums (HDU)	30
Czech Albums (ČNS IFPI)	30
Danish Albums (Hitlisten)	23
Dutch Albums (MegaCharts)	27
Finnish Albums (Suomen virallinen lista)	18
French Albums (SNÉP)	8
German Albums (Offizielle Top 100)	5
Irish Albums (IRMA)	38
Irish Independent Albums (IRMA)	7
Italian Albums (FIMI)	11
Japanese Albums (Oricon)	18
Mexican Albums (AMPROFON)	33
New Zealand Albums (RMNZ)	19
Norwegian Albums (VG-lista)	24
Polish Albums (ZPAV)	18
Portuguese Albums (AFP)	29
Russian Albums (2M)	13
Scottish Albums (OCC)	17
Spanish Albums (PROMUSICAE)	28
Swedish Albums (Sverigetopplistan)	21
Swiss Albums (Schweizer Hitparade)	2
UK Albums (OCC)	14
UK Rock Albums (OCC)	1
US Billboard 200	10
US Top Rock Albums (Billboard)	3
US Top Alternative Albums (Billboard)	2
US Independent Albums (Billboard)	1
US Top Hard Rock Albums (Billboard)	1

=== Year-end charts ===
Chart (2012)	Position
French Albums (SNEP)	139
Russian Albums (2M)	42
US Alternative Albums (Billboard)	50
US Independent Albums (Billboard)	37
US Top Hard Rock Albums (Billboard)	21

== Certifications ==
Region	Certification	Certified units/sales
Europe	—	75,000

== Release history ==
Region	Date	Format	Label	Catalog #	Ref.
Japan	April 25, 2012	CD; LP; DI	Victor Entertainment	VICP-65058	
Germany	April 27, 2012	CD; LP; DI	Vertigo Berlin	B007JPE14K	
Scandinavia	April 27, 2012	CD; LP; DI	Cooking Vinyl	COOKCD/LP554	
Ireland	April 29, 2012	CD; LP; DI	Cooking Vinyl	COOKCD/LP554	
United Kingdom	April 30, 2012	CD; LP; DI	Cooking Vinyl	COOKCD/LP554	
Canada	May 1, 2012	CD; LP; DI	Dine Alone Records	DA059	
Netherlands	May 1, 2012	CD; LP; DI	V2 Records	0711297495416	
United States	May 1, 2012	CD; LP; DI	Cooking Vinyl	COOKCD/LP554	
Australia	May 4, 2012	CD; LP; DI	Cooking Vinyl	COOKCD/LP554	
