= No Reflection =

Single by Marilyn Manson

from the album Born Villain
- Released: March 13, 2012
- Genre: Industrial rock
- Length: 4:36 (album version); 3:31 (radio edit)
- Label: Cooking Vinyl; Hell, etc.
- Songwriters: Marilyn Manson; Twiggy Ramirez; Chris Vrenna
- Producer: Marilyn Manson

Marilyn Manson singles chronology
| "Arma-goddamn-motherfuckin-geddon" (2009) | "No Reflection" (2012) | "Slo-Mo-Tion" (2012) |

Audio sample
- "No Reflection": file; help

"No Reflection" is a song by American rock band Marilyn Manson. The track serves as the lead single from the band's eighth studio album, Born Villain. It was released in digital format on March 13, 2012 through Cooking Vinyl and Hell, etc., over a month ahead of the album. The single was released in physical format on April 21, 2012 as a limited-edition white vinyl, available only in the UK and Europe in celebration of Record Store Day. A music video directed by Lukas Ettlin was released to promote the single and it also features Roxane Mesquida. The music video premiered on April 4, 2012 on Marilyn Manson's VEVO channel. The song plays during the end credits of Chernobyl Diaries.

== Background and release ==
While describing Born Villain, Manson said: "the new record has the ambition and determination of how I started making music in the first place. It sounds like the first record in that it's not afraid to do anything. I had to remove myself from my lifestyle and start fresh", citing the reason of his "new sound/style" in making music. Grade Music World described "No Reflection" as a "dark and brooding song that has Marilyn Manson stamped all over it, from the dissonant industrial scraping and head-nodding riff, to his announcement of "something violent coming." The menace in the singer's voice is a sure sign that perhaps he's back to his best." The single was released online on March 13, 2012, while a limited-edition white vinyl piece will be issued in celebration of Record Store Day. The single was released as white 7" vinyl in the UK and Europe on April 21, and will be strictly limited to 1,500 copies, featuring the album version as the a-side and the single edit on the b-side.

== Reception ==
=== Critical reception ===
The song received a positive review from Loudwire who gave it a 4/5 star rating. They said of the single "We could call 'No Reflection' a "comeback" single, since it’s reminiscent of some of the Antichrist Superstar’s best work." Loudwire also posted a "readers poll" where fans could rate the song. The song maintained strong popularity with the majority of fans voting favorably for the song and also adding dozens of positive comments. As of March 10 only 4.35% of fans voted unfavorably for the song. Kyle Anderson from Entertainment Weekly said: "But is "No Reflection" the way back for Manson, both the band and the man? The guitars are still loud, the beat still propulsive, and the chorus pretty melodic. It doesn’t quite hit the highs of big hits like "The Beautiful People" or "The Dope Show" but this is as tight as Manson has sounded in years." Michal Roffman from Consequence Of Sound gave the song a positive review and said: "its chugging, Faint-friendly distortion offers plenty of sonic waves for Manson to glide over. Industrial enthusiasts still pining for Nine Inch Nails or glory-era Ministry will find solace here." Brett Warner said that "the song is a pretty enjoyable bit of goth-tinged hard rock business."

The music video for the song won Loudwire's Rock Video of the Year 2012. The song was also nominated for the Loudwire Rock Song of the Year, the award for which went to Three Days Grace for the song "Chalk Outline". The song received a nomination for Best Hard Rock/Metal Performance at the 55th Grammy Awards.

== Music video ==
=== Background and reception ===
A music video directed by Lukas Ettlin was released to promote the single. Manson stated in an interview with NOVA while touring Australia in early 2012 that the video would contain segments shot with "never before used technology" stating that he has a friend that "works for National Geographic". The music video also features Roxane Mesquida who featured in Quentin Dupieux's 2010 film "Rubber" which Manson stated was his favourite film to come out that year. On 19 February 2012, Mesquida posted a picture of a roasted bird on a platter with the caption "Shooting Marilyn Manson new music video :)".

The video met with positive reception from critics. Perez Hilton commented: "It's everything we've come to expect from a Manson video: harsh cuts, lots of goth-y make-up, and disturbing images galore!" Sara Gates from Huffington Post said: "Marilyn Manson has never been one to disappoint when it comes to making horrifically dark and gory music videos." Brett Warner from Ology said: "It's more than a little telling that Manson is creepier nowadays with the makeup off, don't you think? NME has politely opted to describe this as "controversial", but you know Manson has truly fallen from grace when poisoning a dinner table's worth of seemingly borderline-underage girls comes across as "tame". Taken on its own merits, the song is a pretty enjoyable bit of goth-tinged hard rock business—it's why the little flashes of performance footage almost manage to outshine the panty flashing and bloody vomiting."

=== Synopsis ===
Marilyn Manson in the main scene of music video for "No Reflection".

The video begins with the camera focusing on a pedestal. Then some kind of liquid is shown that begins to fall on the walls. When the scene changes, Manson is playing guitar in a place full of water. In the next shot, Manson is sitting behind his alleged wife, making a kind of "selection" between different women. For a few seconds between scenes it can be seen that these women are seated and that the strange liquid which was falling from the walls reaches their feet in the room which seems to be a dining room. Manson starts handling them and sits on the tip with his "wife", opens a book and one of the girls that he selected begins serving some kind of liquid in the glasses very similar to the liquid that fell from the walls at the beginning, simulating a dinner. Then there are scenes of Manson singing in front of the camera and band playing in the background. Manson, his wife and the other women cheer and drink the "water". While the singer starts reading the book that he had opened earlier, the women start to get strange behaviors. Manson stands up, boards up the door, and in a few seconds, the band is seen performing the song in a place full of water and, to change the scene, the camera refocuses the room and they all hold hands. Those selected by Manson are scared because the liquid arrives at his feet and constantly falls over the walls at the same time they begin to "vibrate". The interpreter tries to calm them down. He reads a portion of the page of the book and the table begins to levitate. While the girls vomit what they ate before, suffering, the kitchen gets on fire and the girls begin to destroy everything that is in the room. Manson is still sitting with his "wife" and in the next scene she can be seen drinking the remainder of the rare drink. The singer tries to save her in vain. He hugs and kisses her and drowns her in the toilet. While being drowned, she begins to vomit as the other women and dies. The video ends with Manson returning to the dining room where all other women lie dead, adjusting his suit. As the camera cuts away, Manson has disappeared from the room with the bodies still on the floor. His escape seems impossible however, as the door is still boarded up.

== Formats and track listings ==
=== iTunes digital single ===
1. "No Reflection" (album version) – 4:36

=== UK and Europe 7" vinyl single ===
1. "No Reflection" (album version) – 4:36
2. "No Reflection" (radio edit) – 3:31 — The version premiered by KROQ on March 7, 2012.

== Credits and personnel ==
- Marilyn Manson – vocals, guitar, lyrics, composer
- Twiggy Ramirez – guitar, composer
- Fred Sablan – bass guitar
- Chris Vrenna – drums, keyboards, programming

== Charts ==
| Chart (2012) | Peak position |
|---|---|
| Czech Rock Songs (ČNS IFPI) | 2 |
| Swedish Digital Songs (Sverigetopplistan) | 40 |
| UK Rock & Metal (Official Charts) | 12 |
| US Hot Rock & Alternative Songs (Billboard) | 50 |
| US Mainstream Rock (Billboard) | 26 |
| US Rock & Alternative Airplay (Billboard) | 50 |
