= Utah First Credit Union Amphitheatre =

Outdoor performance venue in West Valley City, Utah, United States

Coordinates: 40°39′28″N 112°02′08″W

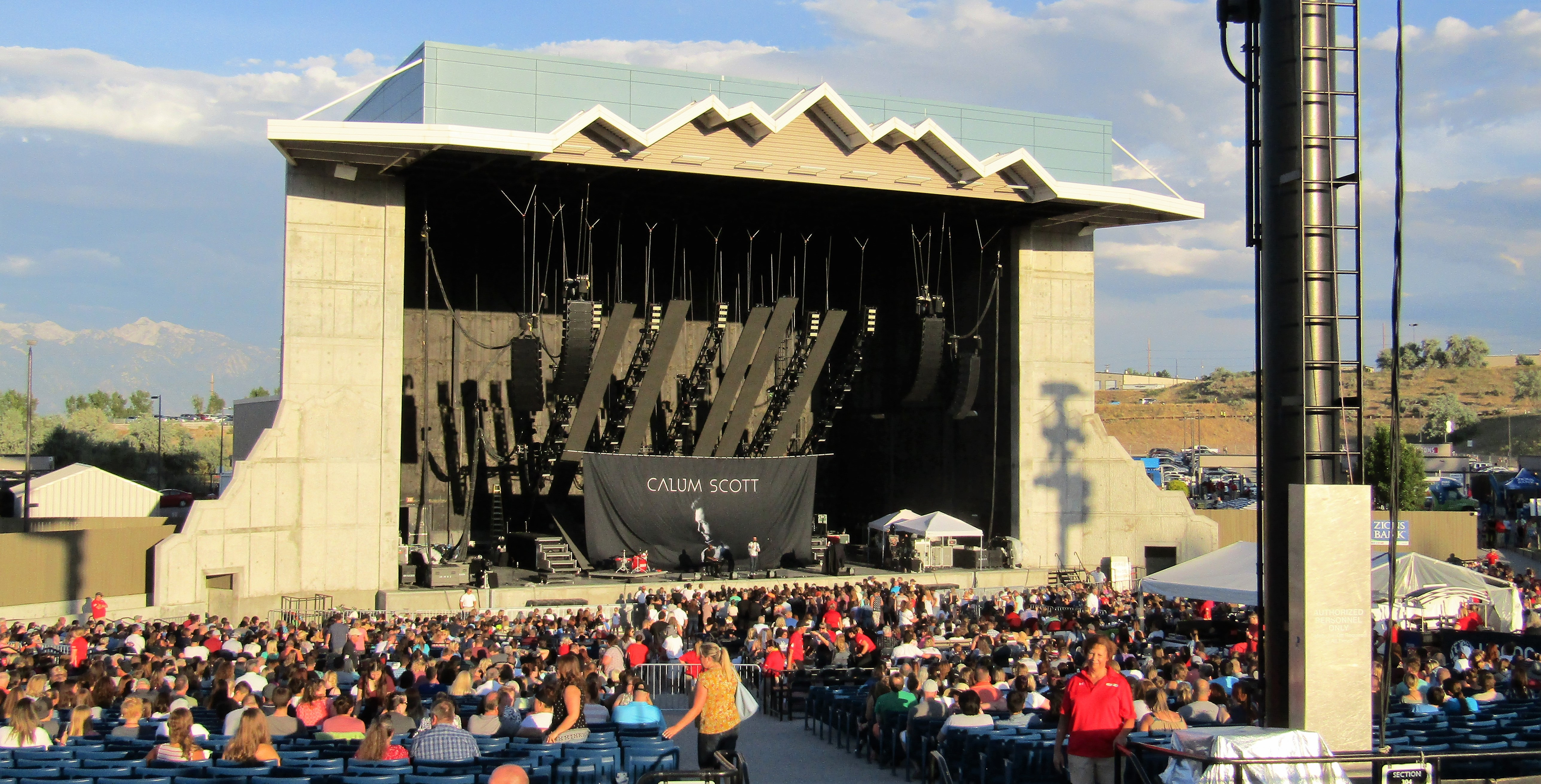
- Venue before a Calum Scott concert, July 12, 2018
- Full name: Utah First Credit Union Amphitheatre
- Former names: USANA Amphitheatre (2003–2024)
- Address: 5150 S 6055 West; West Valley City, UT 84118-6726
- Location: Salt Lake City metropolitan area
- Owner: United Concerts
- Operator: Live Nation
- Capacity: 25,000 (7,000 fixed seat; 18,000 lawn seating)
- Type: Outdoor amphitheatre

Construction
- Groundbreaking: September 2002
- Opened: July 3, 2003
- Cost: $9.4 million ($16.9 million in 2025 dollars)
- Architect: GBD Architects
- General contractor: Hoffman Construction

Website
- Utah First Amphitheater

The Utah First Credit Union Amphitheatre (or simply Utah First Amphitheatre) is an outdoor amphitheater, located in West Valley City, Utah. From 2003 to 2024, the Amphitheater was named after USANA Health Sciences, a manufacturer of nutritional supplements. A new naming rights agreement with Utah First Credit Union was announced on January 23, 2024. It offers a view of the Wasatch Mountains. The venue opened July 2003, with a capacity of 25,000 people.

Concerts are generally held at the Utah First Amphitheatre from May or June through October. The amphitheater was fitted with two large-scale LED video displays prior to the 2019 concert season.

The amphitheater features concerts from a wide variety of artists, including sold-out shows from Kiss in 2014, Morgan Wallen in 2022, and the Foo Fighters in 2023. The venue has also played host to music festivals, including the X96 Big Ass Show, Curiosa, Crüe Fest, Crüe Fest 2 and the Uproar Festival. It also hosted bands and performers like Prince, Earth, Wind & Fire, Janet Jackson, Ghost, Marilyn Manson, the Red Hot Chili Peppers, Limp Bizkit, and Post Malone. Phish performed and recorded their show, on July 15, 2003, which was later released as a live album, entitled Live Phish 07.15.03.

== See also ==
- List of contemporary amphitheatres
- Live Nation
