= Dracula 2000 (soundtrack) =

Dracula 2000: Music from the Dimension Motion Picture

Soundtrack album by various artists
- Released: December 12, 2000
- Recorded: 1999–2000
- Genres: Nu metal; alternative metal
- Length: 56:16
- Labels: Columbia, TriStar
- Producers: Josh Abraham, Diamond Darrell, Ed Gerrard, Don Gilmore, Andy Gould, Denise Luiso, Danny Saber, Vinnie Paul, Wayne Static, Paul Trust, Andy Wallace, Ulrich Wild, Sterling Winfield, Dave Wyndorf, Spider One

Singles from Dracula 2000
- 1. "One Step Closer" Released: September 28, 2000; 2. "Ultra Mega" Released: 2000; 3. "Your Disease" Released: 2000; 4. "Bloodline" Released: 2000

Professional ratings
Review scores
Source	Rating
AllMusic	2.5/5 stars
Kerrang!	2/5 stars

Dracula 2000: Music from the Dimension Motion Picture is a soundtrack compilation album based on the film Dracula 2000. It was released on 12 December 2000. The soundtrack contains 15 tracks from metal artists such as Pantera, Disturbed, Godhead, Marilyn Manson, System of a Down, Linkin Park, Taproot, Hed PE, and Saliva.

== Track listing ==
No.	Title	Writer(s)	Producer(s)	Length
1.	"Ultra Mega" (performed by Powerman 5000)	Spider One (lyrics); Powerman 5000 (music)	Josh Abraham; Powerman 5000	3:30
2.	"A Welcome Burden" (performed by Disturbed)	Disturbed	Johnny K	3:31
3.	"Bloodline" (performed by Slayer)	Tom Araya; Jeff Hanneman; Kerry King	Matt Hyde	3:21
4.	"The Metro" (performed by System of a Down)	John Crawford	D. Sardy	2:59
5.	"Heads Explode" (performed by Monster Magnet)	Dave Wyndorf	Wyndorf; Hyde	3:49
6.	"Break You Down" (performed by Godhead featuring Marilyn Manson)	Jason Miller; The Method; Mike Miller; James O'Connor	Danny Saber	3:17
7.	"One Step Closer" (performed by Linkin Park)	Linkin Park	Don Gilmore	2:37
8.	"Avoid the Light" (performed by Pantera)	Pantera	Vinnie Paul; Dimebag Darrell; Sterling Winfield (co.)	6:27
9.	"Otsego Undead" (performed by Static-X)	Static-X	Wayne Static	3:52
10.	"Swan Dive" (performed by Hed PE)	Jahred Shaine; Wesley Geer; Chad Benekos; Ben Vaught; Doug Boyce; Mark Young	Machine	3:36
11.	"Day by Day" (performed by Taproot)	Taproot	Ulrich Wild	3:20
12.	"Malice" (performed by Endo)	Gil Bitton (lyrics); Endo (music)	Paul Trust	3:43
13.	"Blind World" (performed by Flybanger)	Flybanger	Matt Wallace	4:06
14.	"Sober" (performed by Halfcocked)	Halfcocked	Wild	4:07
15.	"Your Disease" (performed by Saliva)	Josey Scott (lyrics & music); Chris D'Abaldo (music); Wayne Swinny (music); Saliva (music)	Bob Marlette	3:58
