= Book of Shadows: Blair Witch 2 (soundtrack) =

Soundtrack album by Various artists
- Released: October 17, 2000
- Genres: Alternative rock; industrial; heavy metal
- Length: 1:01:53
- Labels: Posthuman; Priority
- Producers: Daniel Myrick (exec.); Eduardo Sanchez (exec.); Marilyn Manson (also exec.); Bob Marlette; Bruce Gilbert; Colin Newman; Dale Penner; Danny Saber; Elastica; Garth Richardson; Gary Smith; Graham Lewis; Howard Benson; Josh Homme; Nickelback; Richard Fearless; Rick Parashar; Rick Rubin; Rob Zombie; Robert Gotobed; Ross Robinson; Scott Humphrey; System of a Down; Thom Panunzio; Tim Holmes; U.P.O.

Book of Shadows: Blair Witch 2 is a 2000 soundtrack album for the feature film of the same name, released by Posthuman and Priority Records.

== Release ==
The soundtrack was released on compact disc on October 17, 2000 by Marilyn Manson's label Posthuman Records and Priority Records.

== Track listing ==
No.	Title	Writer(s)	Producer(s)	Length
1.	"The Reckoning" (performed by Godhead)	Jason C. Miller; Michael Miller; Ullrich Hepperlin; James O'Connor	Danny Saber	4:04
2.	"Lie Down" (performed by P.O.D.)	Paul Sandoval; Marcos Curiel; Mark Daniels; Noah Bernardo	Howard Benson	5:09
3.	"Goodbye Lament" (performed by Tony Iommi and Dave Grohl)	Tony Iommi; Dave Grohl; Bob Marlette	Bob Marlette	4:49
4.	"Dragula" (performed by Rob Zombie)	Robert Cummings; Scott Humphrey	Rob Zombie; Scott Humphrey	3:44
5.	"Mind" (performed by System of a Down)	Serj Tankian; Daron Malakian; Shavarsh Odadjian; John Dolmayan	Rick Rubin; System of a Down	6:18
6.	"Stick It Up" (performed by Slaves on Dope)	Jason Rockman; Kevin Jardine; Frank Salvaggio; Robert Urbani	Thom Panunzio	3:02
7.	"Suicide Is Painless" (performed by Marilyn Manson)	John Mandel; Michael Altman	Marilyn Manson	3:46
8.	"Soul Auctioneer" (performed by Death in Vegas)	Richard Maguire; Tim Holmes; Bobby Gillespie	Richard Fearless; Tim Holmes	6:01
9.	"PS" (performed by Project 86)	Andrew Schwab; Randy Torres; Steven Dail; Alex Albert	Garth Richardson	5:56
10.	"Old Enough" (performed by Nickelback)	Chad Kroeger; Mike Kroeger; Ryan Peake	Dale Penner; Nickelback	2:46
11.	"Feel Alive" (performed by U.P.O.)	Shawn Albro; Chris Weber	Rick Parashar; U.P.O.	4:00
12.	"Tommy (Don't Die)" (performed by Steaknife)	Robert Campbell; Gary Smith	Gary Smith	3:18
13.	"Arcarsenal" (performed by At the Drive-In)	Cedric Bixler-Zavala; James Ward; Omar Rodríguez-López; Paul Hinojos; Tony Hajjar	Ross Robinson	2:55
14.	"Human" (performed by Elastica)	Donna Matthews; Colin Newman; Graham Lewis; Bruce Gilbert; Robert Grey	Elastica; Colin Newman; Graham Lewis; Bruce Gilbert; Robert Gotobed	3:23
15.	"Feel Good Hit of the Summer" (performed by Queens of the Stone Age)	Josh Homme; Nick Oliveri	Josh Homme	2:43
Total length:				1:01:53
