= Non Stop Ride =

Compilation album by Godhead
- Released: March 9, 2004
- Length: 60:29
- Label: Cleopatra Records

Godhead chronology
Evolver (2003)	Non Stop Ride (2004)	The Shadow Line (2006)

Professional ratings
Review scores
Source	Rating
AllMusic	2.5/5 stars

Non Stop Ride is a continuously-mixed compilation album compiled by Jason Miller of American Industrial rock band Godhead with Julian Beeston. It includes covers of The Prodigy's Smack My Bitch Up (covered by Haujobb) and Narayan (covered by Funker Vogt), KMFDM's Virus (covered by Sigue Sigue Sputnik) and Blur's Girls and Boys (covered by Fear Cult). At the end of the album, it includes three covers by Godhead, of Bauhaus's Bela Lugosi's Dead, The Cure's Fascination Street, and The Sisters of Mercy's This Corrosion.

== Track listing ==
1. Funker Vogt - Narayan (The Prodigy song)
2. Zeromancer - Doctor Online
3. Haujobb - Smack My Bitch Up
4. Slick Idiot - It Won't Do
5. X Marks the Pedwalk - I See You
6. VNV Nation - DSMO
7. PIG - Rope
8. Pigface - Blow U Away (G.T.F.A.F.M.)
9. ohGr - Borderline
10. The Damned - Shadow to Fall (Leaether Strip Mix)
11. Spahn Ranch - Vortex
12. Sigue Sigue Sputnik - Virus
13. Fear Cult - Girls & Boys
14. Razed In Black - Visions
15. Die Krupps - Eggshell
16. Pigface - The Horse U Rode In On
17. Godhead - Bela Lugosi's Dead
18. Godhead - Fascination Street
19. Godhead - This Corrosion
