= Jason Charles Miller =

American musician and voice actor

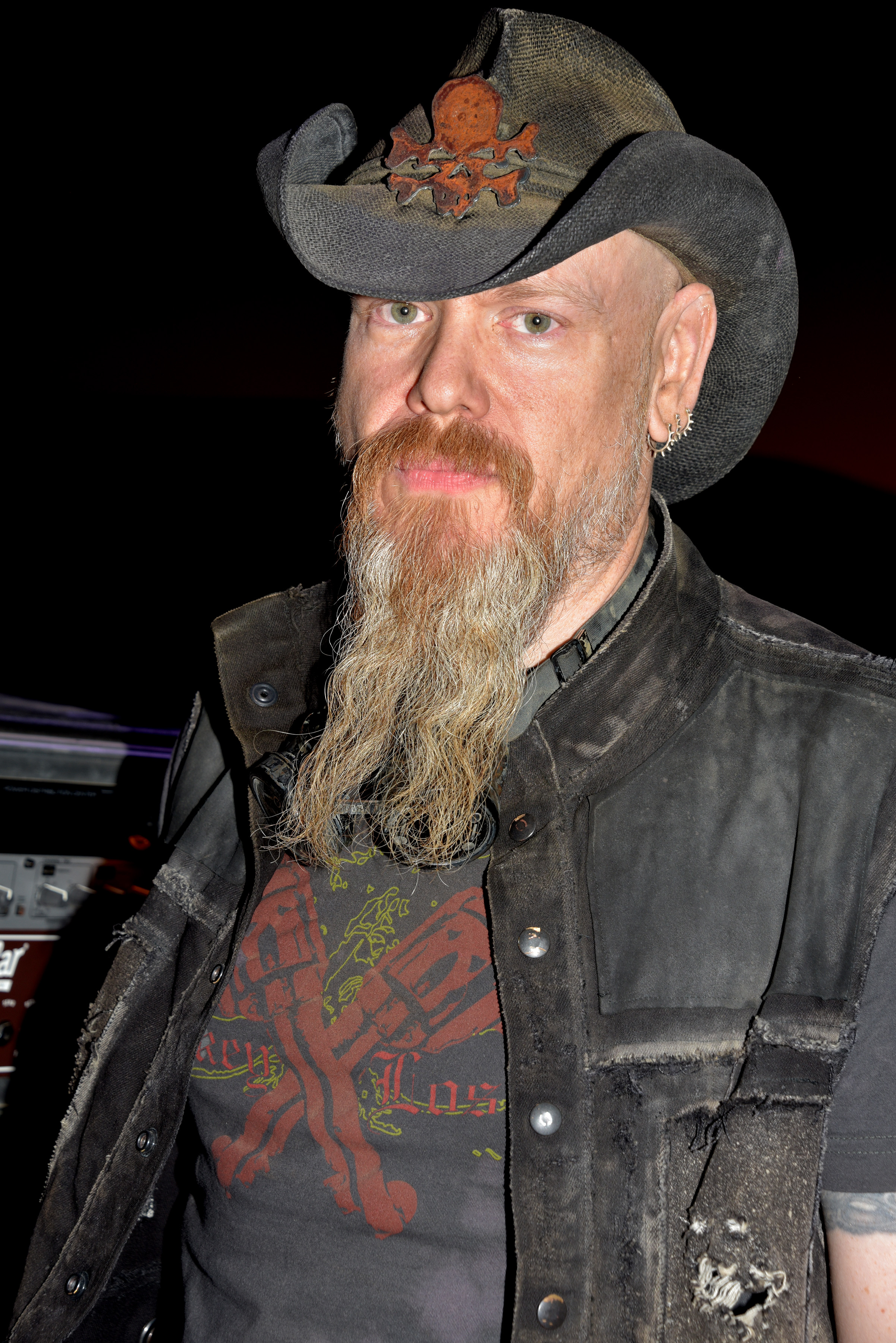
- Miller in 2017

Background information
- Born: Jason Charles Miller
- Genres: Country rock; southern rock; rock; americana; industrial; electronic; alternative metal; nu metal
- Occupations: Musician; singer; songwriter; voice actor
- Instruments: Vocals; guitar
- Website: jasoncharlesmiller.com

Jason Charles Miller is an American musician, singer, and songwriter known for his solo career as well as being the lead vocalist and guitarist of the industrial rock band Godhead. He is a voice actor, appearing in various animation and video games. He is also part of the duo The Deadly Grind, and the duo RezoDrone; which has risen to fame for being featured in the acclaimed videogame Cyberpunk 2077. He has released solo albums in the country rock and southern rock genres.

== Early life ==
In 1977, at the age of 5, Miller moved with his family to Clifton, Virginia where he would spend the remainder of his youth. Miller began singing opera music and playing the guitar while young, and began performing when he was six. He has three stepbrothers and one stepsister.

== Career ==
Miller is the frontman and founder of the industrial rock band Godhead which was the only band signed to Marilyn Manson's Posthuman Records. Under Posthuman Records, Godhead released their fourth studio album 2000 Years of Human Error, which has sold over 100,000 copies in the United States. While a member of Godhead, Miller toured the world alongside acts like Marilyn Manson, Ozzy Osbourne, Black Sabbath, Disturbed, Gwar, Slipknot, Rammstein, Linkin Park, and Jonathan Davis of Korn. In 2002, Godhead's song "Penetrate" was re-released as a part of the Queen of the Damned soundtrack under Warner Music Group. The song earned Miller a Gold record. The band has sold over 250,000 albums worldwide.

In 2004, Miller collaborated with Ben Moody and Jason Jones of Drowning Pool for the song "The End Has Come", which appeared on the soundtrack of the film The Punisher. Miller has also appeared on multiple Cleopatra Records tribute albums along with Julian Beeston, formerly of Nitzer Ebb. Miller's music was featured in the pilot episode of Hung. He was asked by Bret Michaels to remix the Rock of Love theme song for the Poison frontman's Custom Built solo album.

After more than a decade as frontman of Godhead, Miller also began releasing music as a solo artist. On October 27, 2009, Miller released his first solo EP, Last to Go Home, under Count Mecha Music. The EP has been his first official venturing into the country music genre. On October 10, 2011, Miller released his first solo album, entitled Uncountry. Heavier than the previous EP, and featuring a full band, this album cemented his current status as southern rock artist. On July 3, 2012, a second full-length studio album followed, this time titled Natural Born Killer, under Count Mecha Music. In May 2012, Miller released the single "Up to Me". At that time, Miller's songwriting could also be heard on the WWE Smackdown theme song, "Hangman", which was recorded by (and co-written with) the rock band Rev Theory. In 2018, a third studio full-length came out, called In the Wasteland, published via Sony / Red Music and featuring guest appearances by Charlie Starr of Blackberry Smoke and Rickey Medlocke of Lynyrd Skynyrd. The album was then followed in 2021 with the double release From the Wreckage, collecting a series of previously unreleased tracks.

Throughout his career, Miller has been featured in magazines such as Rolling Stone, Billboard, Guitar World, and Inside Kung Fu. He has appeared on MTV, MTV2, Fuse TV, and VH1.

Miller relocated to Los Angeles in 2001, where he owns a recording studio and works as a recording artist, writer and producer, voice-over artist and actor. Splitting time between Los Angeles and Nashville, his love for country and blues music has intensified, as has the influence of those that have defined his musical roots: Johnny Cash, Neil Young, Kris Kristofferson, Merle Haggard, Fleetwood Mac, Bad Company. His first single, "You Get What You Pay For", was featured in the HBO hit series True Blood, and included appearances from Felicia Day and Greg Grunberg in its music video. The Uncountry music video features guests such as Robert Picardo and Grant Imahara.

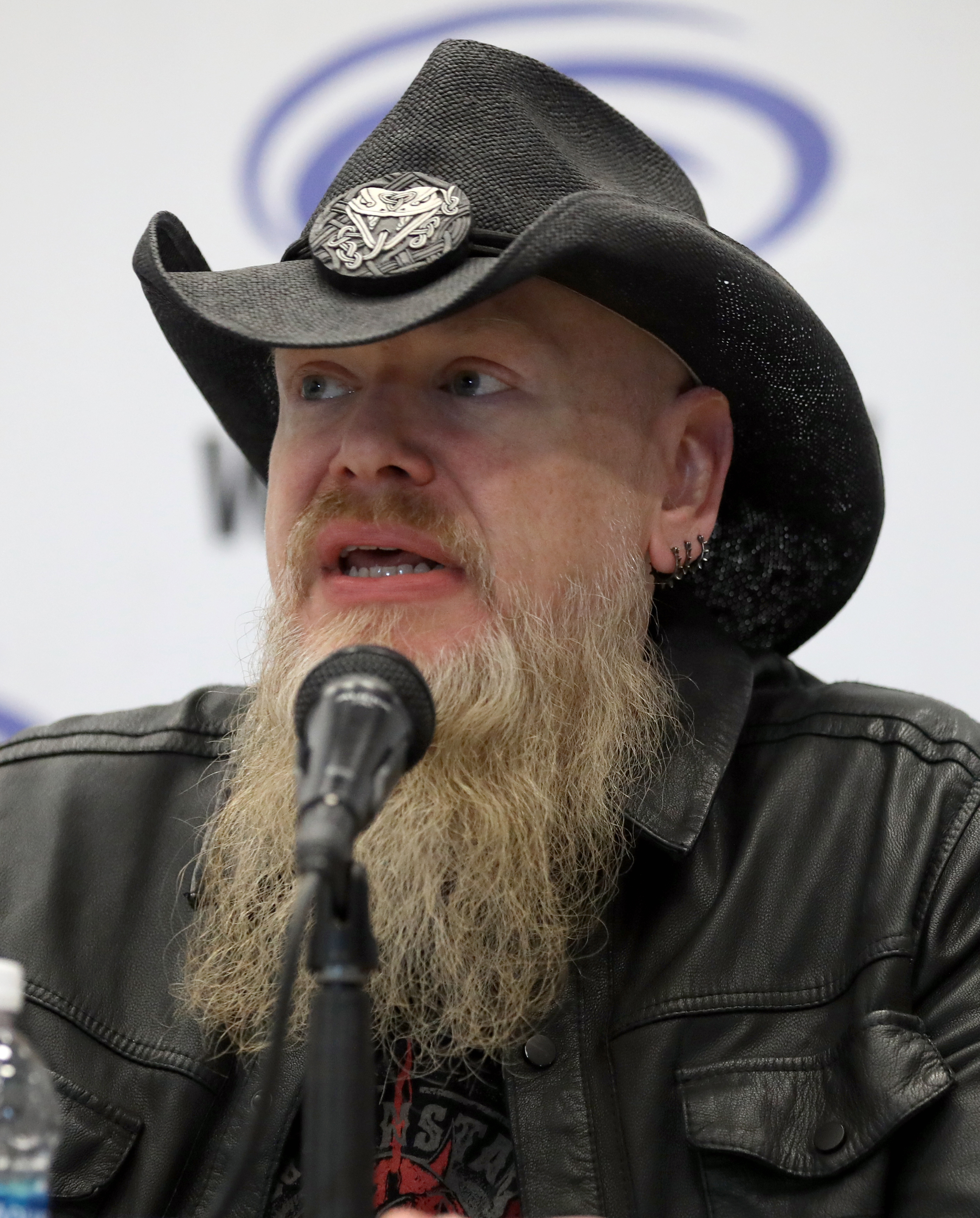
Miller at the 2024 WonderCon

As a voice actor, Miller has appeared in over 100 animated productions and video games. Some of his credits include work on World of Warcraft, Wonder Woman, Ghost in the Shell: Stand Alone Complex, Hellsing, Read or Die and the Nickelodeon Nicktoon Avatar: The Last Airbender. His film credits include Danny Roane: First Time Director, the 2008 remake of Day of the Dead and the Sci Fi Channel's Battle Planet. He worked on a cover album from the fighting game series Guilty Gear, titled Guilty Gear XX in N.Y. Vocal Edition, where he supplied vocals over the instrumentals to create a full vocal album. In 2011, he lent his vocals to another cover album, this time for BlazBlue, the successive fighting game series to Guilty Gear, titles BlazBlue in L.A. Vocal Edition. He provided the voice of Robert Kendo in Capcom's video game Resident Evil: The Darkside Chronicles for the Wii. In 2011, he appeared in an episode of the web series The Guild. His voice can be heard in the digital collectible card game by Blizzard Entertainment, Hearthstone. Since 2017, he is part of the duo The Deadly Grind.

In 2019, Miller was the co-lead singer for the song "Shadowbringers", the theme song for Final Fantasy XIV's third expansion of the same name; and then in 2020, he provided vocals for the game's song "To The Edge". In 2021, Miller contributed vocals to Final Fantasy XIV's Endwalker expansion soundtrack for the track "Close in the Distance". In December of 2022, Miller was invited to Tokyo by Square Enix composer Masayoshi Soken, to perform in a series of Final Fantasy themed concerts with the Eorzean Symphony Orchestra. Other events have been scheduled for Las Vegas and London throughout 2023. In 2025, Miller provided vocals for a new entrance theme composed by Soken for professional wrestler Kenny Omega. He also provided vocals for the song "Unleashed" in the Dawntrail expansion.

In 2021, Miller, along with Dylan Wilks, composed 8 original songs released in the video game album Idle Champions of the Forgotten Realms: Bardic Inspiration Vol. 1. Miller, an avid supporter of tabletop roleplaying games (TTRPGs) such as Dungeons & Dragons, also appeared on several live-play streaming shows such as Critical Role and Sirens of the Realms, as well as the Amazon Prime series Starter Kit.

In 2025, Miller expanded his involvement in tabletop role‑playing games by joining the cast of Legacy of the Ancients, an actual‑play podcast produced by the Glass Cannon Network, based on Paizo’s Rise of the Runelords adventure path. Shortly thereafter, Miller was commissioned by the Glass Cannon Podcast to compose and perform the theme for its flagship series set in the Shadowdark role‑playing game system, which he titled "In the Shadowdark".

== Discography ==
=== Godhead ===
- America Now (1995 compilation)
- Godhead (1996)
- Nothingness (1997)
- Powertool Stigmata (1998)
- 2000 Years of Human Error (2001)
- Evolver (2003)
- Non-Stop Ride (2004 remix compilation)
- The Shadow Line (2006)
- Unplugged (2007 EP)
- At the Edge of the World (2008)
- The Shadow Re-Aligned (2014)

=== Solo ===
- Last to Go Home (2009)
- Uncountry (2011)
- Natural Born Killer (2012)
- In the Wasteland (2018)
- UnDeadwood: Chapter I soundtrack (2019)
- From the Wreckage - Part I (2021)
- From the Wreckage - Part II (2021)
- Cards on the Table (2023)
- Knives In The Dark (2024)

=== Metal Gear Rising: Revengeance Soundtrack ===
- Rules of Nature (2013)
- Red Sun (2013)

=== The Deadly Grind ===
- Songs from Foreververse (2017)

=== RezoDrone ===
==== Cyberpunk 2077 Radio ====
- Resist and Disorder (2020)
- Kill the Messenger (2020)
- Reaktion (2021)

==== Singles ====
- beLIEver (2023)

=== with Felicia Day ===
- Gamer Girl, Country Boy (2012)

=== Appears on ===
- Shadowbringers, To the Edge and Close in the Distance from Eorzean Symphony: FINAL FANTASY XIV Orchestral Album Vol.3 (2023)
- Close in the Distance from ENDWALKER: FINAL FANTASY XIV Original Soundtrack (2022)
- To the Edge from DEATH UNTO DAWN: FINAL FANTASY XIV Original Soundtrack (2021)
- Shadowbringers and Insatiable from SHADOWBRINGERS: FINAL FANTASY XIV Original Soundtrack (2019) and SCIONS & SINNERS: FINAL FANTASY XIV ~ Arrangement Album (2021)

== Roles ==
=== Animation ===
Animation
Year	Title	Role	Notes	Source
1999	Attack the Gas Station	Paint		
2000	Boys Be	Yuuki Okizaki		
2001	Read or Die	Obnoxious Pilot		
2001	Hellsing	Soldier X, various monsters		
2002	Bakuto Sengen Daigunder	Linian		
2002	Ghost in the Shell: S.A.C. 2nd Gig	Mihashi		
2002	Daigunder	Linian, Reporter		
2003	Texnolyze	Shinji		
2003	Read or Die	Eliot, Stephen		
2003	Mermaid Forest	Sakagami Pirate		
2003	Samurai Resurrection	Senpachi		
2004	DearS	Hironobu Nonaka		
2004	Dead Leaves	777		
2004	Naoki Urasawa's Monster	Max Steindorf		
2004	Paranoia Agent	Security Guard, Maromi fan		
2004	Girls Bravo	Young Gangster		
2006	Otogi Zoshi	Keibiishi		
2006	Patlabor: The Movie	Hiromi Yamazaki, Yamadera		
2006	Patlabor 2: The Movie	Hiromi Yamazaki		
2006	Hellsing Ultimate	Policeman Simon (Ep. 1), Round Table Member 4 (Ep. 2), Wild Geese (Ep. 3)		
2007	Higurashi When They Cry	Yoshiro Sonozaki		
2007	Gun Sword	Kujyo, Zakota		
2007	Ikki Tousen	Hannoh		
2007	Rozen Maiden	Yamamoto, Enju		
2008	Code Geass: Lelouch of the Rebellion	Kousetsu Urabe		
2008	Moribito: Guardian of the Spirit	Jin		
2008	Avatar: The Last Airbender	Scary Prisoner, Thug, Head Guard, Dai Li Agent	6 episodes	
2009	Wonder Woman	Thrax	Direct-to-video	
2009	Ghost Slayers Ayashi	OVA – Teizan Mizawa		
2009	Monster	Max Steindorf		
2010	Batman: The Brave and the Bold	Doll Man, Black Condor	Episode: "Cry Freedom Fighters!"	
2011	Yu Gi Oh! Zexal	Clockwork Shinigami, Iron Ai Ai		
2012	Puella Magi Madoka Magica	Nakazawa, additional voices		
2012	Aquarion Evol	Altair Pilot		
2013	Lagrange: The Flower of Rin-ne	Sota Serizawa		
2013	Nura: Rise of the Yokai Clan: Demon Capital	Itaku		
2013	One Piece	Berry Good		
2013	Wolf Children	Radio News Announcer, additional voices		
2013	Batman: The Dark Knight Returns, Part 2	Fireman, Liquor Store Owner		
2014	Attack on Titan	Gelgar		
2014	The Legend of Korra	The Sheriff	Episode: "Rebirth"	
2015	Mobile Suit Gundam: Iron-Blooded Orphans	Aston / Gatt		
2015	Aldnoah.Zero	Mars Knight		
2016	Mobile Suit Gundam: Iron-Blooded Orphans	Aston / Gatt		
2017	Eureka Seven: Hi-Evolution 1	Additional voices		
2017	Attack on Titan	Gelgar		
2018	Eureka Seven Hi-Evolution: Anemone	Ramon / Additional voices		
2018	Pop Team Epic	Shogo		
2019	The Disastrous Life of Saiki K.: Reawakened	Riki Nendo		
2020	DC Super Hero Girls	Ra's al Ghul (singing voice)	Episode: "#LeagueOfShadows"	
2021	Edens Zero	Seth Anderson, Kenta		
2024	The Grimm Variations	Mr. S	Episode 4: "The Elves and the Shoemaker"	

=== Video games ===
Video games
Year	Title	Role	Notes	Source
2008	World of Warcraft: Wrath of the Lich King	Prince Valanar/Commander Stoutbeard/Thalorien Dawnseeker		
2008	The Last Remnant	Various characters		
2009	Resident Evil: The Darkside Chronicles	Robert Kendo		
2010	StarCraft II: Wings of Liberty	Officer #2		
2010	Sengoku Basara: Samurai Heroes	Additional voices (warriors)		
2010	World of Warcraft: Cataclysm	Hagrim Hopebreaker/Terrath the Steady		
2010	Star Trek Online	Kal Dano		
2010–14	Street Fighter series	Guy	English Dub; Credited as J.C. Miller	
2011	Diablo III	Radek the Fence/Bennoc		
2011	Shinobido 2: Revenge of Zen	Kazama Samurai A, Kenobi Ninja	Credited as J.C. Miller	
2012	Guild Wars 2	Ben Tenstrikes, Stefan Baruch, Seneschal Elam, Big Nose Ted		
2013	Final Fantasy XIV: A Realm Reborn	Raubahn Aldynn, Corguevias	Credited as J.C. Miller	
2014	Hearthstone	Loot Hoarder, Bloodmage Thalnos, Acolyte of Pain, Druid of the Claw, Blood Knight		
2015	Mobius Final Fantasy	Additional voices		
2015	Final Fantasy Type-0 HD	Additional voices		
2015	Neverwinter: Underdark	Drizzt Do'Urden		
2016	Mafia III	Additional Voices		
2016	World of Warcraft: Legion	High Commander Goodchilde / Thaedris Feathersong / Blacksmith Kyrie		
2018	The Andersen Accounts: Chapter One Collector's Edition	Bartender Mike / Van Driver		
2018	Onmyoji	Jikikaeru / Hangan		
2019	Shenmue III	Su Zixiong / Han Yajie - Ring Announcer / Additional Cast		
2019	Dreadful Tales: The Fire Within Collector's Edition	Barry		
2019	The Andersen Accounts: A Voice of Reason	Frederic		
2019	Citizens of Space	Captain / Chef / Banker		
2019	Days Gone	Additional voices		
2019	The Andersen Accounts: The Price of a Life Collector's Edition	Reynard / Policeman		
2019	Kingdom Hearts III	Additional voices		
2020	Final Fantasy VII Remake	Additional voices		
2020	Max Gentlemen Sexy Business!	Sinterklaas		
2020	Phantasy Star Online 2	Pietro, Sir Adam Sacrid, Lutz Cero Rey Cuento, Schreger Weyland		
2021	Fire Emblem Heroes	Múspell		
2021	Halo Infinite	Lucas Browning, Spartan Voiceprint DF09		
2022	Tactics Ogre: Reborn	Barbas Dahd Geuse		
2022	Fire Emblem Warriors: Three Hopes	Additional voices		

=== Television and web series ===
Television and web series
Year	Film/Series	Role
2002	The Osbournes	Himself (uncredited)
2005	The Curse of El Charro	Dancing Albino
2006	Danny Roane: First Time Director	Charles Brown
2006	Hollywood Kills	Bartender
2006	Backlash	Assassin
2007	Everyday Joe	Joe
2008	Day of the Dead	Zombie (uncredited)
2011	The Jeff Lewis 5 Minute Comedy Hour	Travis
2011	The Guild	Jason Miller
2012	My Gimpy Life	Teale's Friend
2013	LearningTown	Bartender
2015	House Hunting	Guitar Man
2015	Muzzled the Musical	Tree
2015	Good Morning	Tattooed man
2016	Emil: Wait	Bartender
2016	Future Girl	Biff
2016	Critical Role	Garthok
2017	Thrashtopia	Bunker Bot
2017	Shield of Tomorrow	K'Dok
2017	Mothership	Guest
2018	Tempting Fate	Cont Dalca
2018	L.A. by Night	Strikes a Chord
2019	Hell, California	Abel
2026	Bloodbath '77	Thorne
