= Upcountry =

Upcountry may refer to:

- Upcountry (South Carolina), a historical name for the Upstate region in South Carolina in the United States
  - Upcountry History Museum, Greenville, South Carolina
- Upcountry Maui, a rural region of Maui located on the western side of Haleakalā
- Upcountry (North America), a historical name for the Upland South of the United States
- Upcountry (Sri Lanka), areas of Sri Lanka away from the coast
  - Malaya Rata, the mountainous region of central Sri Lanka.
  - Upcountry Tamil, Indian Tamils of Sri Lankas (vis-à-vis Sri Lankan Tamils)
    - Upcountry National Front, a Sri Lankan political party
    - Up-Country People's Front, a Sri Lankan political party

== See also ==
- Up Country (disambiguation)
- Uncountry
