= The Shadow Line =

The Shadow Line or Shadowline may refer to:

- The Shadow-Line, a 1917 novel by Joseph Conrad
- The Shadow Line (album), an album by Godhead
- The Shadow Line (TV series), a UK TV series
- Smuga cienia or The Shadow Line, a 1976 film by Andrzej Wajda
- Shadowline, a comic books publisher
- Shadowline (Epic Comics), a comic books imprint

== See also ==
- The Shadow Lines, a 1988 novel by Amitav Ghosh
