= 2000 Years of Human Error =

Studio album by Godhead
- Released: January 23, 2001
- Recorded: 2000
- Studio: Dr. Kevorkian's Lab (Los Angeles, California)
- Genres: Industrial metal; nu metal
- Length: 43:29
- Labels: Posthuman; Priority
- Producers: Marilyn Manson (exec.); Danny Saber

Godhead chronology
Power Tool Stigmata (1998)	2000 Years of Human Error (2001)	Evolver (2003)

Singles from 2000 Years of Human Error
- 1. "The Reckoning" Released: 2000; 2. "Break You Down" Released: 2000; 3. "Eleanor Rigby" Released: 2001

Professional ratings
Aggregate scores
Source	Rating
Metacritic	58/100
Review scores
Source	Rating
AllMusic	3/5 stars
NME	2.5/5 stars

2000 Years of Human Error is the fourth studio album by the American rock band Godhead. It was released on January 23, 2001, by Posthuman Records, making this one of Posthuman's only releases. The album contains select songs that have been re-recorded by the band, which previously appeared on 1998's Power Tool Stigmata. "Sinking" has since been re-recorded for the subsequent release Unplugged. The version of "Penetrate" featured on this album was also featured on the soundtrack to the 2002 movie Queen of the Damned. "Break You Down" appeared on the soundtrack to the film Dracula 2000.

2000 Years of Human Error spawned two singles, "The Reckoning" and the Beatles cover "Eleanor Rigby". It also had a music video largely consisting of vocalist Jason C. Miller singing and walking down a street in slow motion as other band members are seen sitting or standing along the sidewalk in a depressed manner.

The album, considered Godhead's breakthrough, has sold over 100,000 copies to date in the United States. Its success earned them recognition by Ozzy Osbourne and landed them a spot on the second stage of Ozzfest 2001. 2000 Years of Human Error features additional contributions by Marilyn Manson bassist Twiggy Ramirez, Scott Putesky (original guitarist for Marilyn Manson, formerly known as Daisy Berkowitz), as well as Manson himself.

== Track listing ==
No.	Title	Writer(s)	Length
1.	"The Reckoning"	Jason Miller; Mike Miller; Ullrich Hepperlin; James O'Connor	4:01
2.	"I Sell Society"	J. Miller; Scott Putesky	4:45
3.	"Inside You"	J. Miller; M. Miller; Hepperlin	3:32
4.	"Sinking"	J. Miller; M. Miller; Hepperlin; O'Connor	3:34
5.	"Tired Old Man"	J. Miller; M. Miller; Hepperlin; O'Connor	4:59
6.	"Break You Down" (featuring Marilyn Manson)	J. Miller; M. Miller; Hepperlin; O'Connor	3:19
7.	"Penetrate"	J. Miller; Hepperlin	4:19
8.	"Backstander"	J. Miller; M. Miller; Hepperlin; O'Connor	3:10
9.	"Eleanor Rigby" (The Beatles cover)	John Lennon; Paul McCartney	4:02
10.	"2000 Years of Human Error"	J. Miller; Jeordie White; Danny Saber; Marilyn Manson	3:06
11.	"I Hate Today"	J. Miller; M. Miller; Hepperlin; O'Connor	4:51
Total length:			43:29

== Personnel ==
- Jason C. Miller – vocals, rhythm guitar, mixing
- Mike Miller – lead guitar, backing vocals
- Ullrich "Method" Hepperlin – bass, programming
- James O'Connor – drums
- Marilyn Manson – vocals (track 6), producer
- Twiggy Ramirez – bass, guitar (tracks 2, 6, 10)
- Reeves Gabrels – guitar, synthesizer (track 5)
- Danny Saber – guitar (track 10), harmonica (track 6), producer, programming, engineering, keyboards
- Stacy Plunk – additional vocals (tracks 1, 9)
- Paul Muniz – vocoder (track 10)
- Doug Milton – editing
- Jeffrey Lesser – mixing, engineering
- John X Volaitis – producer (track 5), mixing
- Eddy Schreyer – mastering
- Jesse Gorman – engineering
- P.R. Brown – cover art, artwork
- Glen Laferman – photography
- Ciulla Management, Inc. – management

== In video games ==
The song "Inside You" was used in the PlayStation 2 game, Shaun Palmer's Pro Snowboarder.

== Chart performance ==
Chart (2001)	Peak position
US Billboard 200	153
US Heatseekers Albums	4
