= The Shadow Realigned =

Remix album by Godhead
- Released: April 29, 2014
- Genre: Industrial rock, alternative metal
- Length: 62:27
- Label: Warrior Records

Godhead chronology
At the Edge of the World (2008)	The Shadow Realigned (2014)

Professional ratings
Review scores
Source	Rating
Exclaim!	6/10 stars
PunkNews	3/5 stars
Under the Gun Review	6/10 stars

The Shadow Realigned remix album by the industrial rock band Godhead, was released on April 29, 2014. The Shadow Realigned was released to co-exist with their 2006 studio release The Shadow Line. The album features songs from The Shadow Line, remixed by producers the band has become friends with over their career. The last three songs are previously unreleased tracks, including a Depeche Mode cover and a Kiss cover, and an original track.

The album was heavily reviewed, with a widespread agreement that the album was of mixed quality. The remixing was viewed as mostly overly aggressive, making too much use of auto-tune, though "Trapped In Your Lies (Neon Genesis Remix)" was specifically indicated as a high quality exception. The covers were considered to be "interesting musically, but disappointing vocally". The sole new song "To Heal" was good viewed as a good call back to the band's earlier music.

== Track listing ==
No.	Title	Length
1.	"The Gift (Robotic Beehive Remix)"	5:04
2.	"Through the Cracks (Sweet Kill Remix)"	3:11
3.	"Unrequited (Ben Moody Remix)"	3:54
4.	"Hey You (Ginormous Remix)"	4:15
5.	"Trapped in Your Lies (Neongenesis Remix)"	4:12
6.	"Inside Your World (Dark Moon Remix)"	4:04
7.	"Goodbye (Khursor Remix)"	4:31
8.	"Another Day (Shok's Other Way Remix)"	5:24
9.	"Once Before (Arritmic Remix)"	3:38
10.	"Push (Creature Remix)"	3:49
11.	"Your End of Days (Jamison Boaz Remix)"	3:57
12.	"Fall Down (Joe Bishara Remix)"	5:07
13.	"Unrequited (Team Cybergeist Remix)"	3:57
14.	"Trapped in Your Lies (Psyclon Nine)"	3:40
15.	"To Heal"	5:00
16.	"God of Thunder" (Kiss Cover)	4:04
17.	"Never Let Me Down Again" (Depeche Mode Cover)	4:40
