= Up Country (disambiguation) =

Up Country is a 2002 novel by Nelson DeMille.

Up Country may also refer to:

- Up Country, a 1972 poetry collection by Maxine Kumin
- Up Country Lions, a defunct Sri Lankan rugby union team
- Up Country Lions SC, a Sri Lankan football club

== See also ==
- Pays d'en Haut (lit. Upper Country), a territory of New France
- Up the Country, an 1892 poem by Henry Lawson
- Up the Country (novel), a 1928 novel by Miles Franklin
- Upcountry (disambiguation)
