= Natural Born Killer =

Studio album by Jason C. Miller
- Released: July 3, 2012
- Recorded: 2012
- Label: Count Mecha Music

Jason C. Miller chronology
Uncountry (2011)	Natural Born Killer (2012)	In The Wasteland (2018)

Natural Born Killer is the second solo album of American singer-songwriter Jason C. Miller. The album was released on July 3, 2012, by Count Mecha Music. Like his previous album Uncountry, this solo album features the single "You Get What You Pay For". The album contains eleven studio tracks, most of which have coauthors except for "I Saw the Light" written by Hank Williams.

== Track listing ==
No.	Title	Writer(s)	Producer(s)	Length
1.	"Devil's Whiskey"	Kris Bergsnes; Jason Charles Miller		3:03
2.	"You Get What You Pay For"	Jason Charles Miller; Jon Nite; Dave Rivers		3:38
3.	"Love Ain't Leavin' You"	Matthew Hager; Jason Charles Miller		3:44
4.	"Here to Kill the Pain"	Rick Ferrell; Jason Charles Miller		3:37
5.	"Natural Born Killer"	Jason Charles Miller; Drew Smith; Driver Williams		3:59
6.	"The Way You Still Want Me"	Steve Freeman; Jason Charles Miller; Jon Nite		3:08
7.	"Up to Me"	Joe Doyle; Jason Charles Miller		3:29
8.	"Long Long Gone"	Jason Charles Miller; Andrew Rollins		3:49
9.	"Raise a Little Hell with an Angel"	Jonathan Clark; Jason Charles Miller		3:29
10.	"As Good Love Goes"	Blue Foley; Jason Charles Miller; Tony Stampley		3:23
11.	"I Saw the Light"	Hank Williams		3:31
