= Evolver (Godhead album) =

Studio album by Godhead
- Released: July 15, 2003
- Studio: Silvercloud Studios (Burbank, California)
- Genre: Industrial rock; industrial metal; nu metal; gothic rock
- Label: Reality Entertainment
- Producer: Wayne Croyle; Joe Floyd; Method; Jason C. Miller

Godhead chronology
2000 Years of Human Error (2001)	Evolver (2003)	The Shadow Line (2006)

Professional ratings
Review scores
Source	Rating
Alternative Vision	4/5 stars
Rock Hard	7.5/10 stars
Melodic	3.5/5 stars

Evolver is the fifth studio album by American industrial metal band Godhead, released by Reality Entertainment on July 15, 2003.

The album has sold over 100,000 copies in the United States to date.

"The Hate in Me" and "Far Too Long" were released as singles.

== Track listing ==
All lyrics are written by Jason C. Miller

No.	Title	Length
1.	"The Hate in Me"	3:41
2.	"Just Like You"	4:08
3.	"The Giveaway"	3:36
4.	"Keep Me Down"	3:28
5.	"Far Too Long"	3:44
6.	"Deconstruct"	3:40
7.	"Fade Away"	4:33
8.	"Dream"	5:15
9.	"Ghost of your Memory"	4:37
10.	"Anybody Else"	3:17
11.	"Rotten"	4:42
12.	"Without" (includes the hidden track "Departure")	10:40

== Musicians ==
- Jason C. Miller: vocals, guitar
- Mike Miller: guitar, backing vocals
- Method: programming, bass
- Tom Z: drums

== Guest musicians ==
- Wayne Static (of Static-X): vocals, "The Giveaway"
- Reeves Gabrels: guitar, "The Hate in Me," "Deconstruct," and "Rotten"
