= D'Hask =

Bruneian rock band

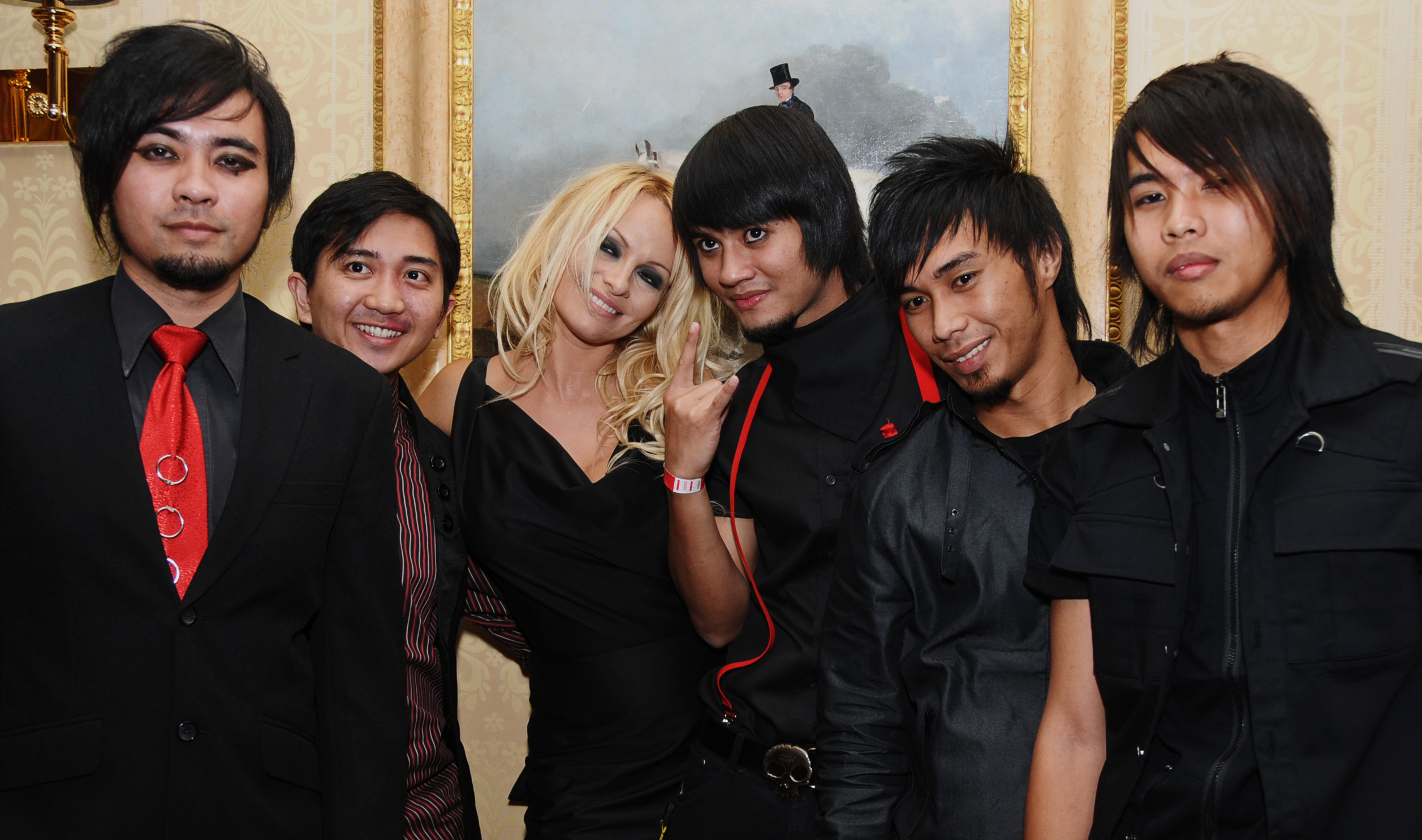
- D'Hask with Pamela Anderson in 2009.

Background information
- Origin: Brunei
- Genres: Alternative rock, hard rock, alternative metal
- Years active: 1999-present
- Label: Madre Records
- Members: K-Roll; Daus; Reme; Syarif; Luffy
- Website: D'hask & Attune

D'Hask is a Bruneian rock band. Formed in 1999, the band consists of main vocalist/rhythm guitarist K-Roll, lead guitarist Daus, bassist Reme, vocalist/keyboardist Syarif and drummer Luffy.

Over the years, D'Hask has released several EP albums and singles. Their single 'Usang 12' topped the local Pelangi FM charts for 14 consecutive weeks. Other hits include 'Kamu, Adalah Mimpi Burukku', 'Hanya Sedikit', 'Seberapa Detik Menyentuhmu' and 'Tempat Ku'.

== Formation ==
D'Hask was officially formed in February 1999 with K-Roll, Syarif, Hanif and Saiful under the name 'The Hask'. The Hask performed on three occasions, with the Malaysian band Spring in 1999, with the Malaysian comedy group Senario in 2000 and lastly, another concert in 2001. After that, the band decided to go on a short hiatus.

In 2004, The Hask, then already called D'Hask, resurfaced in the Brunei music scene with a slight change in their line-up. Reme has replaced Saiful as the bassist in 2002 and Luffy replaced Hanif as their drummer in 2003. In 2007, Daus joined the band as their lead guitarist. The band line-up has since remained unchanged.

== Early Success ==
D'Hask early success stemmed from their active role in Brunei music scene, especially with their participation in competitions held in Brunei. In 2004, the band was the first runner-up in the Rhythm Fiesta, a musical talent competition showcasing talents from all over Brunei. They also participated in the 2004 Battle of the Bands. In the next year, D'Hask attained fourth place in the Rhythm Fiesta.

D'Hask continued to contribute to the local music scene by appearing in video clips such as The Orange Room and CRB for Regalblue Production, Music '05 by Megabone and DSS by Radio Television Brunei.

D'Hask participated in the 2007 Brunei Most Famous Band Challenge as the band 'Three Act Tragedy' which featured the vocalist from another band, Trisera. Three Act Tragedy battled it out with 10 other bands to become the champion of the competition.

== Breakthrough Success ==
Since 2004, D'Hask has been releasing their songs to be played on the local radio stations. Their most played song is 'Usang 12', spending 14 weeks in Pelangi FM's chart. Other songs include 'Hanya Sedikit', 'Kamu, Adalah Mimpi Burukku', 'Hanya Sedikit', 'Seberapa Detik Menyentuhmu' and 'Tempat Ku'. Their presence in the local music scene were recognised when were named Pelangi FM's 'Artist of The Month' in January 2009.

In 2009, D'Hask participated in the Global Battle of the Bands (GBOB) organised by Elevate Malaysia. Although D'Hask did not make it to the finals, the competition has given the band a chance to perform at the prestigious Istana Budaya KL along with other contestants as a guest band for an entertainment programme. In the same year, D'Hask also released the band's EP album called 'Breaking the Error' featuring tracks such as 'Kamu Adalah Mimpi Buruk Ku', 'Seberapa Detik Menyentuhmu' and a new version of the popular 'Usang 12'.

D'Hask made a mark in South East Asia's Music scene when they were nominated in the 2010 Voice Independent Music Awards (VIMA) under the 'Most Electrifying-Exciting-Exhilirating Live Act' category. 30% of the voting scores in VIMA were derived from a microsite and 70% were based on scores given by selected Malaysian and international judges. Their nominations in the VIMA 2010 managed to catapult the band into a wider audience.

With the release of their new English demo 'What's Killing Me' in early 2010, the band gained exposure from a wider audience.

In 2010, the band flew to London for the filming of their first music video, 'Kamu, Adalah Mimpi Buruk Ku'. The big-budget music video made a big impression in the regional music scene as it featured a walk-by appearance by Pamela Anderson. In 2011, D'Hask released a music video for 'Tempat Ku' featuring Marilyn Manson, Bai Ling and JoJo. Both music videos were produced by Sensible Music Productions.

In April 2011, it was revealed in a press conference that D'Hask has become the first band to be signed under the London-based Madre Records, owned by composer and music director, Datuk Ramli MS. The band's future releases will be produced by Malaysian composers to enable their participation in the Malaysian music awards such as Anugerah Juara Lagu (AJL) and Anugerah Industri Musik (AIM).

D'Hask was one of the nominees in the Choice Vocal Duo/Group category in the 2010/2011 Pelangi Awards. Their song 'Cinta Teragung' was also nominated in the Choice Song category.

== Discography ==
=== EPs ===
- Breaking The Error
- Cinta Teragung

== Band members ==
Current members

- Md. Khairul Anwar (K-Roll) – lead vocals, rhythm guitar (1999–present)
- Ak. Md. Syarif (Syarif) – keyboard, backing vocals (1999–present)
- Ak. Hairul Azmi (Reme) – bass (2002–present)
- Ak. Ahmad Lutfy (Luffy) – drums (2003–present)
- Md. Firdaus (Daus) - lead guitar (2007–present)

Former members

- Saiful – bass (1999–2002)
- Hanif – drums (1999–2003)
