= Uncountry =

Studio album by Jason C. Miller
- Released: October 10, 2011
- Genres: Country rock; southern rock; alternative country
- Label: Count Mecha Music

Jason C. Miller chronology
Last to Go Home (2009)	Uncountry (2011)	Natural Born Killer (2012)

Uncountry is the debut solo studio album of Jason C. Miller. The album was released on October 10, 2011, by Count Mecha Music.

The title track was released as a single on September 2, 2011. The song "You Get What You Pay For" can be heard in Episode 7 of the third season of HBO's True Blood.

== Track listing ==
No.	Title	Writer(s)	Producer(s)	Length
1.	"Uncountry"	Miller; Randall Clay	Miller	3:32
2.	"The Dotted Line"	Miller	Miller	3:25
3.	"The River"	Miller; Bart Allmand	Miller	3:38
4.	"You Must Have Loved Me A Lot"	Miller; Chuck Goff	Miller	3:15
5.	"You Get What You Pay For	Miller; Jon Nite; David Rivers	Miller; Dan Hodges	3:36
6.	"Learn To Live With It" (feat. Tina Guo)	Miller	Miller	4:16
7.	"Into Temptation"	Miller; Phil Barton; Kris Bergsnes	Miller	3:35
8.	"Still Doing Time"	Miller; Eric Berdon	Miller	3:04
9.	"The Devil"	Miller	Jay Ruston; Darren Leader	3:36
10.	"Drag Me Down"	Miller	Jay Ruston; Leader	2:55

== Credits and Personnel ==
- Jason Charles Miller – Vocals, Acoustic guitar, Electric Guitar, producer, Writing
- Russell Ali – Guitar
- David D. Diaz – Drums
- Paul Cartwright – Fiddle
- Ben Peeler – Lap Steel, Dobro
- Jonah Mclean – Keyboard
- Adam Hall – Banjo
- Dave Mattera – Bass Guitar
- Brett Boyett – Slide guitar
- Jon Walls – Drums, Mixing, Engineering
- James Mitchell – Electric Guitar
- Steve Hinson – Pedal Steel
- Mike Wolofsky – Bass Guitar
- Dennis Wage – Keyboard
- Wayne Killius – Drums
- Pat McGrath – Acoustic guitar
- Biff Watson – Acoustic guitar
- Adam Shoenfeld – Electric Guitar
- Nick Buda – Drums
- Aubrey Richmond – Fiddle
- Mike Brignardello – Bass Guitar
- "Cowboy" Eddie Long – Pedal Steel
- Jim "Moose" Brown – Keyboard
- Michael "Fish" Herring – Electric Guitar Solo
- Jamison "Metal" Boaz – Acoustic guitar Solo, Backing Vocals
- Caroline Clark – Backing Vocals
- Tina Guo – Cello
- Eric Berdon – Acoustic guitar
- Ben Carey – Electric Guitar
- Jeff Friedel – Drums
- Marty O’Brien – Bass Guitar
- George Balulis – Electric Guitar
- Ted Russell Kamp – Slide guitar
- Jay Ruston – Mixing, Engineering, producer
- Stewart Cararas – Mastering
- Darren Leader – Producer
- Phil Barton – Writing
- Kris Bergsnes – Writing
- Geoff Bisente – Mixing, Engineering, Gang Vocals
- Dan Hodges – Producer
- Dan Certa – Mixing, Engineering
- Derek Jones – Mixing, Engineering
- Jordan Greene – Engineering
- Jon Nite – Writing
- David Rivers – Writing
- Chuck Goff – Writing
- Bart Allmand – Writing
