= Posthuman Records =

American record label

Posthuman
- Parent company: Priority
- Founded: 2000
- Founder: Marilyn Manson
- Defunct: 2002
- Status: Defunct
- Genre: Industrial rock, electronic
- Country of origin: United States

Posthuman Records was an American record label specializing in industrial rock and electronic music, founded by Marilyn Manson in 2000. It was a vanity label operating under the parent company Priority Records. The label was Marilyn Manson's first vanity label. Posthuman Records is now defunct.

== Background ==
Posthuman Records was founded in 2000 by Marilyn Manson, frontman of the controversial band of the same name. Posthuman was created as a vanity label under the much larger Priority Records parent company, the American record label that launched the career of N.W.A. Even though Posthuman was his own label, Marilyn Manson remained signed to Nothing Records, the subsidiary of Interscope Records.

The Posthuman record label is most famous for its one and only signing, Godhead. On January 23, 2001, Posthuman released Godhead's 2000 Years of Human Error album.

In addition to Godhead, Posthuman delivered the soundtrack to the film Blair Witch Project 2: Book of Shadows as the first official Posthuman release. Danny Chaotic of American industrial rock band Chaotica also worked with the label, remixing Godhead's cover of the Beatles' popular "Eleanor Rigby". Chaotica was never physically signed to Posthuman however. In April 2002, it was announced that the record label had come to an end. This left Godhead seeking a new label to sign under as well.

== Posthuman Studios ==
Although there was never a physical Posthuman Studios, there were a number of studios involved in the productions the label released. Godhead's 2000 Years of Human Error album was recorded at Dr. Kevorkian's Lab in Los Angeles, California, which may or may not actually be Marilyn Manson's own studio, the Doppelherz Blood Treatment Facility. It is also possible that Marilyn Manson's cover of "Suicide Is Painless" featured on the soundtrack to the film Blair Witch Project 2: Book of Shadows was recorded at The Mansion in Death Valley, California, during the recording of the Marilyn Manson's 2000 album Holy Wood (In the Shadow of the Valley of Death). Godhead's 2000 Years of Human Error album was also mixed at Westlake Studios in Los Angeles.

== Aftermath ==
In a July interview with Outburn in 2003, Manson spoke about Posthuman Records, saying, "Yeah [Posthuman Records is gone now], but that was something that was never really Marilyn Manson orientated, because I'm signed to Interscope. . . . Yeah, I found it unsatisfying, because I don't like to try and manipulate somebody else's work into something that is marketable. For me, by nature, I create things that I think people will like, but it's part of my motivation and it's not money driven. Success of reaching people is what drives it. It made me feel like the people I don't like in a lot of ways. It was an interesting experience to try, but I don't feel like it's something that I want to do."

In 2010, Marilyn Manson created a second vanity label called Hell, etc., under the parent company Cooking Vinyl. On May 1, 2012, Marilyn Manson's eighth studio album Born Villain was released worldwide as the first release of the new vanity label.

== Trivia ==
The label was named after the seventh track on the band's 1998 album Mechanical Animals, "Posthuman".

== Artists ==
- Godhead

== See also ==
- List of record labels
- Hell, etc.
