= Godhead (band) =

American rock band

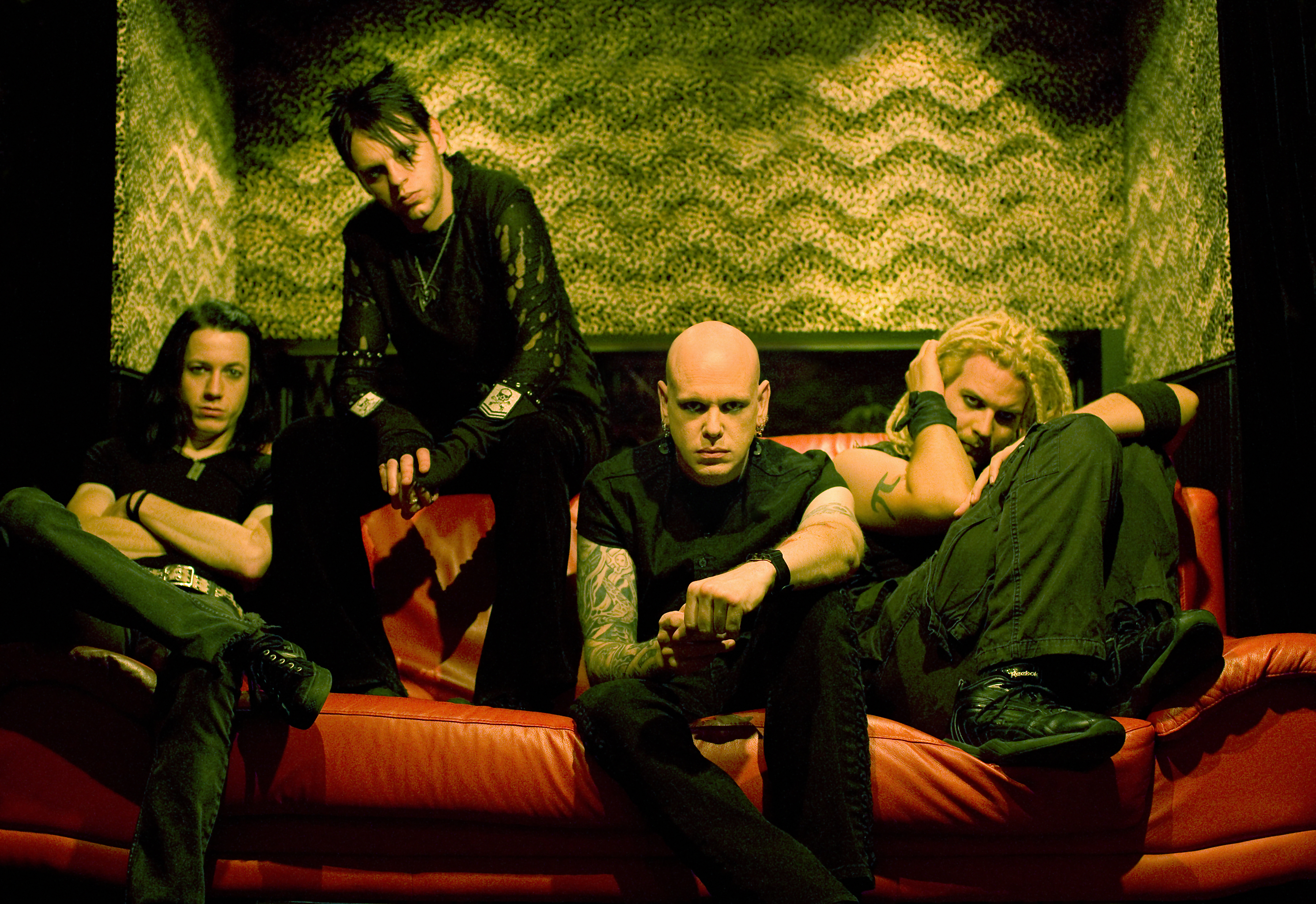
- Godhead in 2008

Background information
- Origin: Washington, D.C., U.S.
- Genres: Industrial rock; industrial metal; alternative rock; gothic rock; alternative metal; nu metal
- Years active: 1994–present
- Labels: Driven; Cement Shoes; Posthuman; Warrior Records
- Members: Jason C. Miller; Mike Miller; Ullrich "Method" Hepperlin; Ty Smith
- Past members: Bruce Brandstatter; John Pettitt; James O'Connor; Tom Z Ken Jay; Glendon Crain
- Website: godhead.com

Godhead (occasionally typeset as gODHEAD) is an American rock band from Washington, D.C. They were the only band signed to musician Marilyn Manson's short-lived vanity label, Posthuman Records.

== History ==
The band was formed in 1994 under the early moniker Blind, but made their first performance as Godhead shortly after in Fairfax, Virginia that April. After fairly remaining in obscurity for a number of years, the band was noticed by Marilyn Manson and in 2000 signed a record contract with Manson, making them the first act of Posthuman Records. This deal culminated with the release of their breakthrough studio album in January 2001 entitled, 2000 Years of Human Error, which earned Godhead recognition by Ozzy Osbourne and landed them a spot on Ozzfest where the band headlined the second stage that same year. The album featured additional contributions by Marilyn Manson bassist Twiggy Ramirez, Scott Putesky (original guitarist for Marilyn Manson, formerly known as Daisy Berkowitz), as well as Manson himself. Despite being briefly hindered by the dissolution of Posthuman, the band has steadily developed a following since their breakthrough. In the early years the band was managed by Scott Cohen.

Drummer James O'Connor left the band prior to the recording of their fifth studio album, Evolver. He was replaced by Tom Z, who remained with the band for a very short time before being replaced by former Static-X drummer Ken Jay. Both Static-X's Wayne Static and Reeves Gabrels, best known for his long partnership with British musician David Bowie, contributed to the album, which was released in 2003. In 2005, frontman Jason C. Miller invited O'Connor to return as the band's drummer to which he accepted, though he departed from Godhead for a second time in 2006, following the completion of The Shadow Line. He was replaced this time by Glendon Crain.

On March 24, 2008, the band revealed that Ty Smith of Bullets and Octane would be replacing Crain as drummer. Shortly after, the band announced their plans to release a DVD featuring a special acoustic performance held in Los Angeles earlier in the year, and as well announced their seventh studio album as in production. This album, later confirmed to be titled At the Edge of the World, featured studio material, as well as five remixes, and contained artwork by the English artist Sam Shearon.

Throughout their career, Godhead has toured on their own, as well as with Ozzfest, Marilyn Manson, Disturbed, Rammstein, Mudvayne, Orgy, Static-X, Ra, Ill Niño, The Dreaming, Gravity Kills, SOiL and American Head Charge. In late October–December 2007, they toured in support of Jonathan Davis and the SFA.

Jason C. Miller is owner of Central Command Studios. In October 2009, Jason C. Miller released his first solo album, Last to Go Home.

== Musical style and influences ==
Godhead has been variously described as industrial rock, gothic rock and nu metal. On their official MySpace profile, the band credits David Bowie, The Cure, Depeche Mode, Pink Floyd, Ozzy Osbourne, and Nine Inch Nails as their influences.

In a guest spot on Geek & Sundry's "GM Tips" YouTube series, Jason Charles Miller revealed that the original inspiration for the band's name originated from a setting in a pen-and-paper role-playing game scenario printed in the Feb/Mar 1984 issue of Fantasy Gamer magazine, where the setting was named "The Haven of the Godhead".

== Band members ==
Current

- Jason C. Miller – vocals, rhythm guitar (1992–present)
- Mike Miller – lead guitar (1997–present)
- Ullrich "Method" Hepperlin – bass, programming (1998–present)
- Ty Smith – drums (2008–present)

=== Former members ===
- Dwayne Reid – drums (1992–1994)
- John Pettit – drums (1993–1997)
- Bruce Brandstatter – bass (1992–1997)
- Tom Z – drums (2002-2003)
- Ken Jay – drums (2003–2004)
- James O'Connor – drums (1997–2002, 2004–2006)
- Glendon Crain – drums (2006–2008)

== Discography ==
- America Now (1994)
- Godhead (1995)
- Nothingness (1997)
- Power Tool Stigmata (1998)
- 2000 Years of Human Error (2001)
- Evolver (2003)
- The Shadow Line (2006)
- Unplugged (EP, 2007)
- At the Edge of the World (2008)
- The Shadow Realigned (2014)
