= The Shadow Line (album) =

Studio album by Godhead
- Released: August 29, 2006
- Genre: Alternative rock; post-grunge; industrial rock
- Length: 49:01
- Label: Cement Shoes
- Producer: Godhead, Ben Moody and Julian Beeston

Godhead chronology
Evolver (2003)	The Shadow Line (2006)	Unplugged (2007)

Professional ratings
Review scores
Source	Rating
AllMusic	3.5/5 stars
Melodic	3.5/5 stars
Metal Storm	Unfavorable

The Shadow Line is the sixth studio album by the industrial rock band Godhead, released on August 29, 2006. The album marks the band's stylistic departure from their traditional industrial gothic rock sound towards alternative rock and post-grunge, although some electronic elements are still present.

== Background ==
In 2005, frontman Jason C. Miller invited James O'Connor to return as the band's drummer, which he accepted. Following the completion of The Shadow Line, however, O'Connor left the group for a second time.

"Trapped In Your Lies" was the album's lead single. It was followed by "Push" and "Hey You".

== Track listing ==
1. "Trapped in Your Lies" - 3:30
2. "Hey You" - 4:12
3. "The Gift" - 4:33
4. "Fall Down" - 4:24
5. "Push" - 3:37
6. "Another Day" - 4:50
7. "Once Before" - 3:49
8. "Unrequitted" - 3:53
9. "Through the Cracks" - 4:20
10. "Goodbye" - 3:38
11. "Your End Of Days" - 4:26
12. "Inside Your World" - 3:49
