= Method (Godhead) =

Programmer, bassist and keyboard player for rock band Godhead

Ullrich Gerd Hepperlin, known as Method, or the Method, is an American musician. He is the programmer, bassist and keyboard player for rock band Godhead. He is also a prominent solo songwriter, remixer and producer, as well as a graphic designer and web designer.

Hepperlin lives in Los Angeles and is currently employed as an environmental graphics designer and signage project manager for the H Toji Companies in Long Beach, California.
