= Macbeth on screen =

Film versions of the play Macbeth

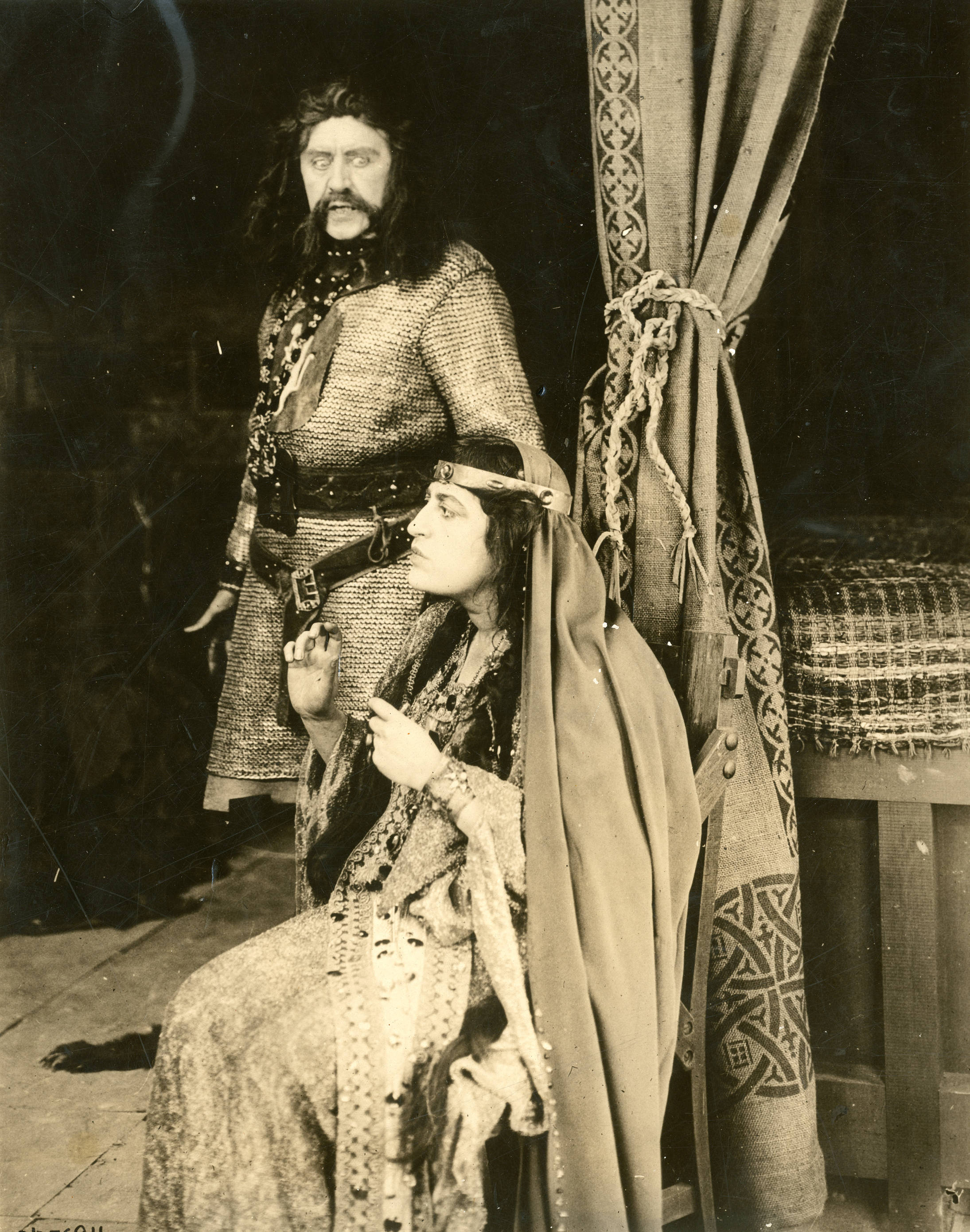
Herbert Beerbohm Tree and Constance Collier in Macbeth (1916)

William Shakespeare's Macbeth has been screened numerous times, featuring many of the biggest names from stage, film, and television.

== Film history and significant releases ==
The earliest known film Macbeth was 1905's American short Death Scene From Macbeth, and short versions were produced in Italy in 1909 and France in 1910. Two notable early versions are lost: Ludwig Landmann produced a 47-minute version in Germany in 1913, and D. W. Griffith produced a 1916 version in America featuring the noted stage actor Herbert Beerbohm Tree. Tree is said to have had great difficulties adapting to the new medium, and especially in confining himself to the small number of lines in the (silent) screenplay, until an ingenious cameraman allowed him to play his entire part to an empty camera, after which a real camera shot the film.

=== Twentieth century ===
In 1947, David Bradley produced an independent film of Macbeth, intended for distribution to schools, most notable for the designer of its eighty-three costumes: the soon-to-be-famous Charlton Heston.

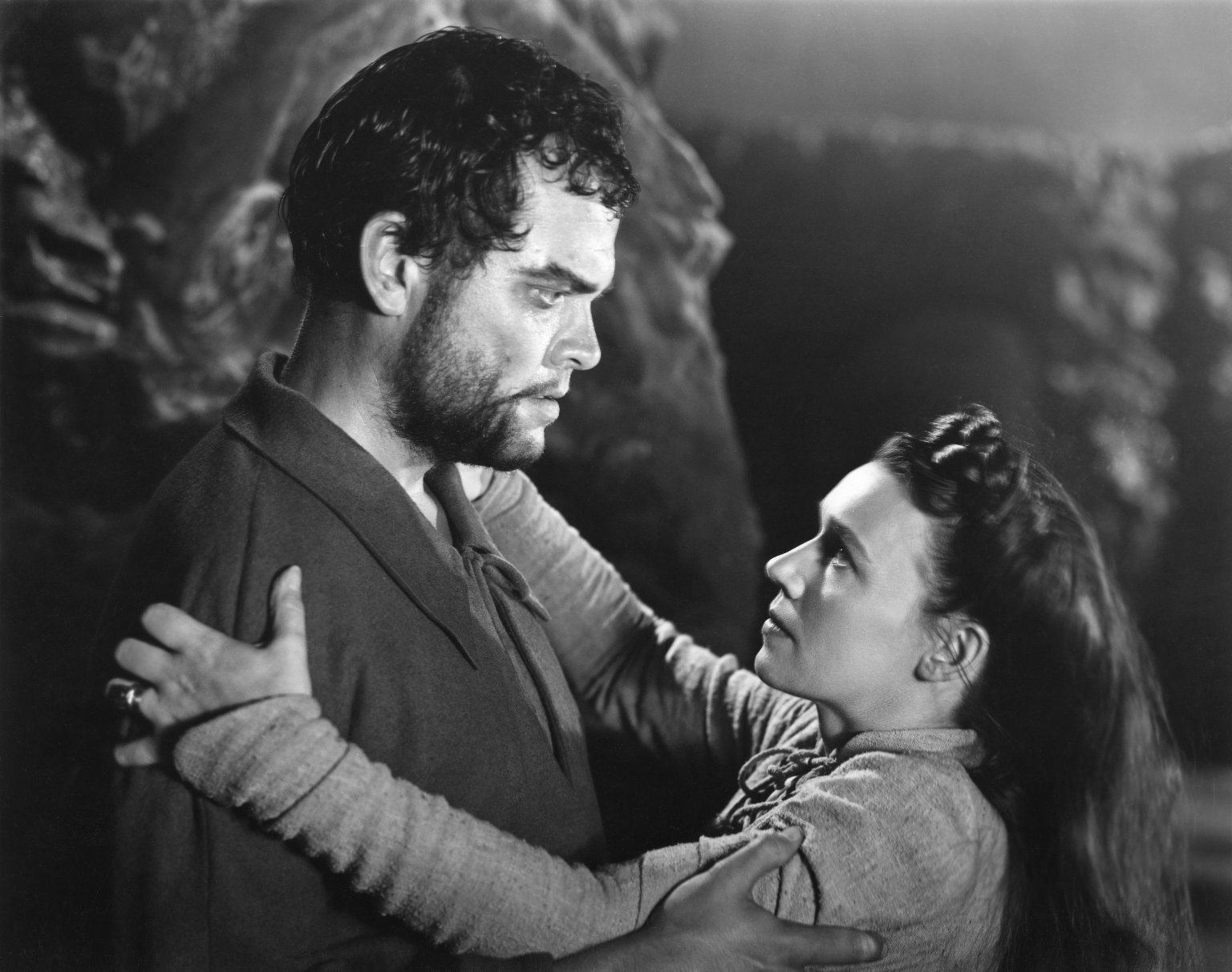
Orson Welles and Jeanette Nolan as Macbeth and Lady Macbeth in Welles' 1948 film adaptation of the play.

Orson Welles' 1948 Macbeth, in the director's words a "violently sketched charcoal drawing of a great play", was filmed in only 23 days and on a budget of just $700,000. These filming conditions allowed only a single abstract set, and eclectic costumes. Dialogue was pre-recorded, enabling the actors to perform very long individual takes, including one of over ten minutes surrounding the death of Duncan. Welles himself played the central character, who dominates the film, measured both by his time on screen, and by physical presence: high-angle and low-angle shots and deep-focus close-ups are used to distort his size in comparison to other characters. Welles retained from his own 1936 stage production the image of a Voodoo doll controlling the fate of the central character: and at the end it is the doll we see beheaded. The film's allegorical aspect is heightened by Welles' introduction of a non-Shakespearean character, the Holy Father (played by Alan Napier), in opposition to the witches, speaking lines taken from Shakespeare's Ross, Angus and the Old Man. Contemporary reviews were largely negative, particularly criticising Welles' unsympathetic portrayal of the central character. Newsweek commented: "His Macbeth is a static, two-dimensional creature as capable of evil in the first scene as in the final hours of his bloody reign." However, contemporary reviews have been far more positive.

George Schaefer directed Maurice Evans and Judith Anderson in a 1960 made-for-TV film which later had a limited European theatrical release. (The three had also worked together on the earlier Hallmark Hall of Fame 1954 TV version of the play.) Neither of the central couple was able to adapt their stage acting style to the screen successfully, leading to their roles being described by critics as "recited" rather than "acted".

Roman Polanski's 1971 Macbeth was the director's first film after the brutal murder of his wife, Sharon Tate, and reflected his determination to "show [Macbeth's] violence the way it is ... [because] if you don't show it realistically then that's immoral and harmful." His film showed deaths only reported in the play, including the execution of Cawdor, and Macbeth stabbing Duncan, and its violence was "intense and incessant". Made in the aftermath of Zeffirelli's youthful Romeo and Juliet, and financed by Playboy mogul Hugh Hefner, Polanski's film featured a young sexy lead couple, played by Jon Finch (28) and by Francesca Annis (25), who controversially performed the sleepwalking scene nude. The unsettling film score, provided by the Third Ear Band, invoked "discord and dissonance". While using Shakespeare's words, Polanski alters aspects of Shakespeare's story, turning the minor character Ross into a ruthless Machiavellian, and adding an epilogue to the play in which Donalbain (younger son of Duncan) arrives at the witches' lair, indicating that the cycle of violence will begin again.

In 1973, the Virginia Museum Theater (VMT, now the Leslie Cheek Theater), presented Macbeth, starring E.G. Marshall. Dubbed by the New York Times as the "'Fowler' Macbeth" after director Keith Fowler, it was described by Clive Barnes as "splendidly vigorous, forcefully immediate... probably the goriest Shakespearean production I have seen since Peter Brook's 'Titus Andronicus'."

Trevor Nunn's RSC Other Place stage performance starring Ian McKellen and Judi Dench as the leading couple was adapted for TV and broadcast by Thames Television (see Macbeth (1978 film)).

In 1992 S4C produced a cel-animated Macbeth for the series Shakespeare: The Animated Tales, and in 1997 Jeremy Freeston directed Jason Connery and Helen Baxendale in a low budget, fairly full-text, version.

In Shakespeare's script, the actor playing Banquo must enter the stage as a ghost. The major film versions have usually taken the opportunity to provide a double perspective: Banquo visible to the audience from Macbeth's perspective, but invisible from the perspective of other characters. Television versions, however, have often taken the third approach of leaving Banquo invisible to viewers, thereby portraying Banquo's ghost as merely Macbeth's delusion. This approach is taken in the 1978 Thames TV production, Jack Gold's 1983 version for BBC Television Shakespeare, and in Penny Woolcock's 1997 Macbeth on the Estate. Macbeth on the Estate largely dispensed with the supernatural in favour of the drug-crime driven realism of characters living on a Birmingham housing estate: except for the three "weird" (in the modern sense of the word) children who prophesy Macbeth's fate. This production used Shakespeare's language, but encouraged the actors – many of whom were locals, not professionals – to speak it naturalistically.

=== Twenty-first century ===
Twenty-first-century cinema has re-interpreted Macbeth, relocating "Scotland" elsewhere: Maqbool to Mumbai, Scotland, PA to Pennsylvania, Geoffrey Wright's Macbeth to Melbourne, and Allison L. LiCalsi's 2001 Macbeth: The Comedy to a location only differentiated from the reality of New Jersey, where it was filmed, through signifiers such as tartan, Scottish flags and bagpipes. Alexander Abela's 2001 Makibefo was set among, and starred, residents of Faux Cap, a remote fishing community in Madagascar. Leonardo Henriquez' 2000 Sangrador (in English: Bleeder) set the story among Venezuelan bandits and presented a shockingly visualised horror version.

In 2004 an "eccentric" Swedish/Norwegian film, based on Alex Scherpf's Ice Globe Theatre production of Macbeth, was said by critic Daniel Rosenthal to owe "more to co-director Bo Landin's background in natural history documentaries than to Shakespeare." More conventional adaptations of 21st-century stage productions to television include Greg Doran's RSC production filmed in 2001 with Antony Sher and Harriet Walter in the central roles, and Rupert Goold's Chichester Festival Theatre Macbeth televised in 2010 with Patrick Stewart and Kate Fleetwood as the tragic couple. The cast of the latter felt that the history of their stage performance (moving from a small space at Chichester to a large proscenium arch stage in London to a huge auditorium in Brooklyn) made it easier for them to "re-scale", yet again, their performances for the cameras.

In 2006, Geoffrey Wright directed a Shakespearean-language, extremely violent Macbeth set in the Melbourne underworld. Sam Worthington played Macbeth. Victoria Hill played Lady Macbeth and shared the screenplay credits with Wright. The director considered her portrayal of Lady Macbeth to be the most sympathetic he had ever seen. In spite of the high level of violence and nudity (Macbeth has sex with the three naked schoolgirl witches as they prophesy his fate), intended to appeal to the young audiences that had flocked to Romeo + Juliet, the film flopped at the box office.

Justin Kurzel's feature-length adaptation Macbeth, starring Michael Fassbender and Marion Cotillard, was released in October 2015.

Also in 2015, Brazilian film A Floresta que se Move (The Moving Forest) premiered at the Montreal World Film Festival. Directed by Vinícius Coimbra and starred by Gabriel Braga Nunes and Ana Paula Arósio, the film uses a modern-day setting, replacing the throne of Scotland with the presidency of a high-ranked bank.

Denzel Washington was nominated to an Academy Award for his performance in the title role of Joel Coen's The Tragedy of Macbeth (2021).

== Adaptations ==
Joe MacBeth (Ken Hughes, 1955) established the tradition of resetting the Macbeth story among 20th-century gangsters. Others to do so include Men of Respect (William Reilly, 1991), Maqbool (Vishal Bhardwaj, 2003) and Geoffrey Wright's Australian 2006 Macbeth.

In 1957, Akira Kurosawa used the Macbeth story as the basis for the "universally acclaimed" Kumunosu-jo (in English known as Throne of Blood or (the literal translation of its title) Spiderweb Castle). The film is a Japanese period-piece (jidai-geki), drawing upon elements of Noh theatre, especially in its depiction of the evil spirit who takes the part of Shakespeare's witches, and of Asaji, the Lady Macbeth character, played by Isuzu Yamada, and upon Kabuki Theatre in its depiction of Washizu, the Macbeth character, played by Toshiro Mifune. In a twist on Shakespeare's ending, the tyrant (having witnessed Spiderweb Forest come to Spiderweb Castle) is killed by volleys of arrows from his own archers after they come to the realization he also lied about the identity of their former master's murderer. In 1964, Hussein Haniff for Singaporean studio Keris Film Production made a Malay language remake of this movie called Istana Berdarah (lit. 'Bloody Palace') released in 1964.

William Reilly's 1991 Men of Respect, another film to set the Macbeth story among gangsters, has been praised for its accuracy in depicting Mafia rituals, said to be more authentic than those in The Godfather or GoodFellas. However the film failed to please audiences or critics: Leonard Maltin found it "pretentious" and "unintentionally comic" and Daniel Rosenthal describes it as "providing the most risible chunks of modernised Shakespeare in screen history."

Billy Morrissette's Scotland, PA reframes the Macbeth story as a comedy-thriller set in a 1975 fast-food restaurant, and features James LeGros in the Macbeth role and Maura Tierney as Pat, the Lady Macbeth character: "We're not bad people, Mac. We're just under-achievers who have to make up for lost time." Christopher Walken plays vegetarian detective Ernie McDuff who (in the words of Daniel Rosenthal) "[applies] his uniquely offbeat menacing delivery to innocuous lines." Scotland, PA's conceit of resetting the Macbeth story at a restaurant was followed in BBC Television's 2005 ShakespeaRe-Told adaptation.

Vishal Bhardwaj's 2003 Maqbool, filmed in Hindi and Urdu and set in the Mumbai underworld, was produced in the Bollywood tradition, but heavily influenced by Macbeth, by Francis Ford Coppola's 1972 The Godfather and by Luc Besson's 1994 Léon. It deviates from the Macbeth story in making the Macbeth character (Miyan Maqbool, played by Irfan Khan) a single man, lusting after the mistress (Nimmi, played by Tabbu) of the Duncan character (Jahangir Khan, known as Abbaji, played by Pankaj Kapoor). Another deviation is the comparative delay in the murder: Shakespeare's protagonists murder Duncan early in the play, but more than half of the film has passed by the time Nimmi and Miyan kill Abbaji.

The 2011 short film Born Villain, directed by Shia LaBeouf and starring Marilyn Manson, was inspired by Macbeth and features multiple scenes where characters quote from it.

In 2014, Classic Alice wove a 10 episode arc placing its characters in the world of Macbeth. The adaptation uses students and a modern-day setting to loosely parallel Shakespeare's play. It starred Kate Hackett, Chris O'Brien, Elise Cantu and Tony Noto and embarked on an LGBTQ plotline.

The 2015 American black and white film, Thane of East County, features actors in a production of Macbeth who mimic the characters they portray.

The 2021 Malayalam-language film Joji directed by Dileesh Pothan is a loose adaptation of Shakespeare's Macbeth.

The 2021 Bengali web-series Mandaar on Hoichoi, directed by Anirban Bhattacharya and starring Debasish Mondal and Sohini Sarkar, is a loose adaptation of Shakespeare's Macbeth.

== List of screen performances ==
=== Silent Era ===
Title	Format Country Year	Director	Macbeth	Lady Macbeth
Duel Scene from Macbeth	Silent United States 1905	Billy Bitzer (cinematographer)		
Macbeth	Silent United States 1908	J. Stuart Blackton	William V. Ranous	Louise Carver
Macbeth	Silent Italy 1909	Mario Caserini	Dante Cappelli	Maria Caserini
Macbeth	Silent France 1909	André Calmettes	Paul Mounet	Jeanne Delvair
Macbeth	Silent United Kingdom 1911	Will Barker	Frank Benson	Constance Benson
Macbeth	Silent Germany 1913	Arthur Bourchier	Arthur Bourchier	Violet Vanbrugh
Macbeth	Silent France 1915		Séverin-Mars	Georgette Leblanc
Macbeth	Silent United States 1916	John Emerson	Herbert Beerbohm Tree	Constance Collier
Macbeth	Silent United Kingdom 1922	H. B. Parkinson	Russell Thorndike	Sybil Thorndike

=== Sound films ===
Title	Format Country Year	Director	Macbeth	Lady Macbeth
Macbeth	Germany 1922	Heinz Schall		
Macbeth	United Kingdom 1945	Henry Cass	Wilfrid Lawson	Cathleen Nesbitt
Macbeth	United States 1948	Orson Welles	Orson Welles	Jeanette Nolan
Macbeth	United States 1951	Katherine Stenholm	Bob Jones Jr.	Barbara Hudson Sowers
Hallmark Hall of Fame Macbeth	TV United States 1954	Hudson Faucett, George Schaefer	Maurice Evans	Judith Anderson
Macbeth	France 1956	Thomas A. Blair	David Bradley	Jain Wilimovsky
Macbeth	Feature United States 1959	Claude Barma	Daniel Sorano	María Casares
Hallmark Hall of Fame Macbeth – Emmy Award–winning remake	filmed on location in England and Scotland 1960	George Schaefer	Maurice Evans	Judith Anderson
Macbeth	TV Australia 1960	William Sterling	Kenneth Goodlet	Dinah Shearing
Macbeth	TV Canada 1961	Paul Almond	Sean Connery	Sharon Acker
Macbeth	TV Australia 1965	Alan Burke	Wynn Roberts	Terri Aldred
Play of the Month: Macbeth	TV United Kingdom 1970; TV United States 1975	John Gorrie	Eric Porter	Janet Suzman
Macbeth - a 5-part adaption released for ITV School's Drama series	TV United Kingdom 1970	Charles Warren	Michael Jayston	Barbara Leigh-Hunt
Macbeth	Feature United States and United Kingdom 1971	Roman Polanski	Jon Finch	Francesca Annis
Macbeth – film of the Royal Shakespeare Company's Other Place production	TV United Kingdom 1979	Philip Casson, Trevor Nunn (writer)	Ian McKellen	Judi Dench
Macbeth	United Kingdom 1981	Joan Ashworth		
Macbeth	United Kingdom 1981	Arthur Allan Seidelman	Jeremy Brett	Piper Laurie
Macbeth	TV Hungary 1982	Béla Tarr	György Cserhalmi	Erzsébet Kútvölgyi
BBC Television Shakespeare Macbeth – released in the United States as part of the Complete Dramatic Works of William Shakespeare series.	TV United Kingdom 1983	Jack Gold	Nicol Williamson	Jane Lapotaire
Shakespeare: The Animated Tales Macbeth	TV Russia and United Kingdom 1992	Nicolai Serebryakov	Brian Cox	Zoë Wanamaker
Macbeth	Australia 1996	Thomas R. Gough (producer)	Julia Reece	Julienne Horsman
Macbeth	United Kingdom 1997	Jeremy Freeston, Brian Blessed	Jason Connery	Helen Baxendale
Macbeth	Belarus 1997	Mikhail Ptashuk	Oleg Garbuz	Tatjana Zhdanova
Macbeth Horror Suite di Carmelo Bene Da William Shakespeare	TV Italy 1997	Carmelo Bene	Carmelo Bene	Silvia Pasella
Macbeth	TV United Kingdom 1998	Michael Bogdanov	Sean Pertwee	Greta Scacchi
Macbeth	United States 1998	Paul Winarski	Stephen J. Lewis	Dawn Winarski
Macbeth – film of the Royal Shakespeare Company's Swan production	Video United Kingdom 2001	Gregory Doran	Antony Sher	Harriet Walter
Macbeth	United States 2003	Bryan Enk	Peter J. Brown	Moira Stone
Macbeth	Sweden 2004	Alex Scherpf, Bo Landin		
Macbeth – television adaptation of Royal Shakespeare Company's stage production	TV United Kingdom 2010	Rupert Goold	Patrick Stewart	Kate Fleetwood
Wee Willie Macbeth	Canada 2011	Paul Lenart		
Macbeth	Paraguay 2011	Horacio Ojeda Lacognata	Horacio Ojeda Lacognata	Alicia Ávalos
The Soliloquy	United States 2012	Josh Murray	Josh Murray	Kate Foster
Macbeth - Shakespeare's Globe - The Globe on Screen's stage production	United Kingdom 2013	Eve Best	Joseph Milson	Samantha Spiro
Macbeth	United Kingdom 2015	Justin Kurzel	Michael Fassbender	Marion Cotillard
Macbeth	United Kingdom 2018	Kit Monkman	Mark Rowley	Akiya Henry
Macbeth	Russia 2020	Sergei Tsimbalenko	Sergei Tsimbalenko	
The Tragedy of Macbeth	United States 2021	Joel Coen (writer, producer, and director)	Denzel Washington	Frances McDormand
Macbeth	United States 2022	Christopher Carter Sanderson	Sean Kenin	Meaghan Bloom Fluitt

=== Unfinished ===
Title	Format Country Year	Director	Macbeth	Lady Macbeth
Macbeth	United Kingdom 1956-59	Laurence Olivier	Laurence Olivier	Vivien Leigh

== Adaptations ==
- When Macbeth Came To Snakeville (United States, 1914, silent)
  - Roy Clements, director
  - Harry Todd, as Macbeth
  - Evelyn Selbie, as Lady Macbeth
- The Real Thing at Last (United Kingdom, 1916, silent)
  - L.C. MacBean, director
  - Edmund Gwenn as Rupert K. Thunder (Macbeth)
  - Nelson Keys as Lady Macbeth
- Jwala (India, 1938)
  - Vinayek, director
  - Chandramohan, Angar (Macbeth)
  - Ratnaprabha, Mangala (Lady Macbeth)
- Marmayogi (India, 1951)
  - K. Ramnoth, director
- Crimson Curtain (France, 1952)
  - André Barsacq, director
  - Pierre Brasseur as Ludovic Arn (Macbeth)
  - Monelle Valentin as Aurélia Nobli (Lady Macbeth)
- Marmayogi (India, 1964)
  - B. A. Subba Rao, director
- Joe MacBeth (United Kingdom, 1955) is a film noir resetting of the story as a gang war in Chicago
  - Ken Hughes, director
  - Paul Douglas as Joe MacBeth
  - Ruth Roman as Lily Macbeth
- Throne of Blood (a.k.a. Cobweb Castle or Kumonosu-jo) (Japan, 1957) is an adaptation of the Macbeth story to a Japanese setting.
  - Akira Kurosawa, director
  - Toshirō Mifune as Washizu Taketoki
  - Isuzu Yamada as Washizu Asaji
- Teenage Gang Debs (United States, 1966), setting the theme around a teenage girl who joins a street gang.
  - Sande N. Johnsen, director
  - Diane Conti as Terry (the Lady Macbeth character)
- The first series of The Black Adder (TV, United Kingdom, 1983), written by Richard Curtis and Rowan Atkinson, is a parody of Shakespeare's plays, particularly Macbeth, Richard III and Henry V.
- Men of Respect (United States, 1991) is a retelling of the Macbeth story as a Mafia power struggle in New York City, in modern English, but closely tracking the original plot.
  - William Reilly, director
  - John Turturro as Mike Battaglia
  - Katherine Borowitz as Ruthie Battaglia
- Scenes from Macbeth (Canada, 1992)
  - Chris Philpott, director
- In The Flesh (Hungary and United States, 1997) - Pornographic adaption of the play.
  - Antonio Passolini and Stuart Canterbury, directors
  - Mike Horner as Lord Macbeth
  - Kylie Ireland as Lady Macbeth
- Star Wars: Macbeth (United States, 1997)
  - Bien Conception and Donald Fitz-Roy, directors
- Macbeth On The Estate (United Kingdom, 1997)
  - Penny Woolcock, director
  - James Frain as Macbeth
  - Susan Vidler as Lady Macbeth
- The Scottish Tale (United States, 1997), romantic-comedy adaption of the play.
  - Mack Polhelmus, director
  - Josiah Polhemus as Mack
  - Ann Boehkle as Beth
- Naked Frailties (Canada, 1998)
  - Larry Reese, director
- Macbeth in Manhattan (United States, 1999)
  - Greg Lombardo. director
  - Nick Gregory as William (Macbeth)
  - Gloria Reuben as Claudia (Lady Macbeth)
- Borough of Kings (United States, 2000)
  - Elyse Lewin, director
- Rave Macbeth (Canada and Germany, 2001)
  - Klaus Knoesel. director
  - Michael Rosenbaum as Marcus (Macbeth)
  - Nicki Aycox as Lidia (Lady Macbeth)
- Macbeth: The Comedy (United States, 2001)
  - Allison L. LiCalsi, director
  - Erika Burke as Macbeth
  - Juliet Furness as Lady Macbeth
- Scotland, PA (United States, 2001) is set in and around a fast food restaurant in the 1970s.
  - William Morrissette, writer/director
  - Maura Tierney as Pat McBeth
  - James LeGros as Joe "Mac" McBeth
  - Christopher Walken as Lieutenant McDuff
  - Kevin Corrigan as Anthony "Banko" Banconi
  - Andy Dick, Timothy "Speed" Levitch, and Amy Smart as the three Bohemians
- Makibefo (Madagascar, 2001)
  - Alexander Abela, director
  - Martin Zia as Makibefo (based on Macbeth)
  - Neoliny Dety as Valy Makibefo (Lady Macbeth)
- Mad Dawg: Running Wild In The Streets (United States, 2001)
  - Greg Salman, director
  - Lamic Blake as Mac
  - Lunden De'Leon as Lady Mac
- Yellamma (India, 2001)
  - Mohan Koda, director
- Sangrador (Venezuela, 2003) is an adaptation set in the 1900s Andean Venezuelan mountains
  - Leonardo Henríquez, director
  - Daniel Alvarado, as Max (the Macbeth character)
  - Karina Gómez, as Mileidi (the Lady Macbeth character)
- Maqbool (India, 2004) is a Macbeth adaptation set in the Mumbai underworld.
  - Vishal Bhardwaj, director
  - Irfan Khan as Mian Maqbool (the Macbeth character)
  - Tabu as Nimmi (the Lady Macbeth character)
- ShakespeaRe-Told Macbeth (United Kingdom, TV, 2005) is a modern adaptation by Peter Moffat, set in a Glasgow restaurant.
  - James McAvoy as Joe Macbeth
  - Keeley Hawes as Ella (the Lady Macbeth character)
  - Richard Armitage as Peter Macduff
- Macbeth 3000: This Time, It's Personal (Canada, 2005)
  - Geoff Warren Meech, director
  - Bill Stepee as Macbeth
  - Kate Hortop as Lady Macbeth
- Macbeth (Australia, 2006) – film set against the backdrop of a violent gang war in Melbourne, Australia.
  - Geoffrey Wright, director
  - Sam Worthington as Macbeth
  - Victoria Hill as Lady Macbeth
- Macbeth (United States, 2006)
  - Michael T. Starks. director
  - Clyde Sacks as Macbeth
  - Karilyn T. Starks as Lady Macbeth
- Mickey B (United Kingdom, 2006)
- The Banquet (China, 2006), Chinese adaption (that also borrows elements of Hamlet) set during the Five Dynasties and Ten Kingdoms period.
  - Feng Xiaogang, director
- Max & Beth (United Kingdom, 2008)
- Macbeth's Disciple (United Kingdom, 2008)
  - Jasmin Tempest, director
  - Roger Barclay as Macbeth
- Macbeth (United States, 2009), apocalyptic adaption.
  - Brandon Arnold, director
  - Hans Totterer as Macbeth
  - Chrissy Ellison as Lady Macbeth
- Macbeth No More (United Kingdom, 2010)
  - Suri Krishnamma, director
- Bill Shakespeare in Hollywood (United States, 2011)
  - Jocelyn Ranne, director and as Lady Macbeth
- Shakespeare Must Die (Thailand, 2012)
  - Ing Kanjanavanit, director
- Macbett (The Caribbean Macbeth) (United States, 2012)
  - Aleta Chappelle, director
  - Terrence Howard as Macbett (Macbeth)
  - Sanaa Lathan as Lady Macbett (Lady Macbeth)
- The Tragedy of Macbeth (United States, 2012), CGI adaption of Macbeth with a sci-fi setting.
  - Don Gallagher, director
- Macbeth Unhinged (United States, 2016). A revised version of the film was released in 2022, titled Curse of the Macbeths.
  - Angus MacFadyen, director and as Macbeth
  - Taylor Roberts as Lady Macbeth
- Veeram (India, 2016) is a Malayalam language adaptation set in 13th century India.
- Il maledetto (Italy, 2017), Italian gangster adaption of Macbeth.
  - Giulio Base, director
  - Nicola Nocella as Michele (Macbeth)
  - Ileana D'Ambra as Leda (Lady Macbeth)
- Joji (India, 2021) is a Malayalam language crime drama based on Macbeth.
- Mandaar (India, 2021) is an Indian Bengali language crime thriller adaptation set in a fishing village in West Bengal, released as a web series and is available on Hoichoi.
- Mayaa (India, 2023)
  - Raajhorshee De, director

== Theatrical performances within films ==
Another way in which filmmakers use Shakespearean texts is to feature characters who are actors performing those texts, within a wider non-Shakespearean story. In Opera, the 1987 Italian giallo horror film written and directed by Dario Argento and starring Cristina Marsillach, Urbano Barberini, and Ian Charleson; young opera singer Betty (Marsillach) is reluctantly thrust into the lead role in Verdi's Macbeth. During her first performance, a murder takes place in one of the opera boxes. Mysterious murders continue throughout the film as Betty is stalked and those around her meet their unfortunate end. During the final performance of the opera, the killer is revealed, and Betty must confront her past in a terrifying climax.

In Thane of East County, a 2015 American black and white film, actors in a production of Macbeth mirror the actions of the characters they portray.

== See also ==
- Shakespeare on screen
- Cultural references to Macbeth
- The Scottish Play
