= Souli (film) =

2004 Malagasy drama film by Alexander Abela

- French promotional release poster
- Directed by: Alexander Abela
- Written by: Alexander Abela; William Shakespeare (based on Othello)
- Cinematography: Joseph Areddy
- Edited by: Christel Dewynter; Anthony Sloman
- Music by: Deborah Mollison
- Release date: 6 November 2004 (Amiens International Film Festival)
- Running time: 94 minutes
- Countries: France; Madagascar; United Kingdom
- Languages: French, Malagasy

Souli is a 2004 Malagasy drama film written and directed by Alexander Abela and based on William Shakespeare's Othello. It follows Abela's 1999 film Makibefo, an adaptation of Macbeth.

== Plot ==
Carlos (based on Shakespeare's Cassio) is a young Spanish student searching for the renowned Senegalese poet Souli, who may be the last griot to possess the "Thiossan tale". Souli, based on Othello, is working as a fisherman and living with a young French woman Mona (based on Desdemona). Abela's version of the villainous Iago is French trader Yann, who, helped by his girlfriend Abi, plots to destroy the lives of Souli and Mona.

== Cast ==
- Eduardo Noriega as Carlos
- Aurélien Recoing as Yann
- Makena Diop as Souli
- Fatou N'Diaye as Abi
- Jeanne Antebi as Mona

== Distribution and reception ==
Souli played at festivals including the 2004 Montreal World Film Festival and the 2005 Rio de Janeiro International Film Festival. In 2005, it was nominated for the Grand Prix at the Paris Film Festival.
