= Men of Respect =

1990 film

- Directed by: William C. Reilly
- Written by: William C. Reilly; William Shakespeare
- Produced by: Ephraim Horowitz
- Starring: John Turturro; Katherine Borowitz; Dennis Farina; Peter Boyle; Stanley Tucci; Steven Wright; Rod Steiger
- Cinematography: Bobby Bukowski
- Edited by: Elizabeth Kling
- Music by: Misha Segal
- Distributed by: Columbia Pictures
- Release dates: May 1990 (France); January 18, 1991 (U.S.)
- Running time: 113 minutes
- Country: United States
- Languages: English; Spanish
- Box office: $139,155

Men of Respect is a 1990 crime drama film, an adaptation of William Shakespeare's play Macbeth. It stars John Turturro as Mike Battaglia, a Mafia hitman who climbs his way to the top by killing his boss.

The film also stars Rod Steiger, Stanley Tucci, Dennis Farina and Peter Boyle and is directed by William C. Reilly. It is not the first film to transplant Macbeth to the American mob culture; this was done in the 1955 film Joe MacBeth.

== Plot ==
Mike Battaglia, a powerful lieutenant in the D'Amico crime family, executes a large-scale hit on the family's enemies, earning a promotion to a caporegime and the undying respect of his boss, Don Charlie D'Amico. Despite the Don's generosity, however, Battaglia secretly resents D'Amico for passing him over as his successor.

At the instigation of Ruthie, his wife, Battaglia murders D'Amico and has his sons shipped off to Florida, clearing the way for him to assume control of the D'Amico family. He becomes an underworld despot, deciding to kill anyone he suspects as a threat to his power, including former ally Bankie Como and his unconnected son, Philly, who survives an assassination attempt.

At his coronation as boss, a drunken Battaglia alienates two more of the mob's powerful soldiers. Afraid that Battaglia's reign will spell the end of the D'Amico family, several of Battaglia's underlings desert him and ally themselves with D'Amico's eldest son, Mal.

Battaglia puts a hit out on his chief rival, Matt Duffy, but the assassins cannot find him, instead murdering his wife and son. Ruthie commits suicide out of guilt, which devastates Battaglia. Determined to get revenge for the death of his family, Duffy comes to kill Battaglia, who arrogantly proclaims that "no man of woman born" can harm him. Duffy responds that he was delivered via caesarian section, and therefore was not technically born of a woman. Disposing of Battaglia, he clears the way for Mal to assume control of the family.

== Reception ==
The film has been praised for its accuracy in depicting Mafia rituals, which are said to be more authentic than those in The Godfather or GoodFellas. However the film failed to please audiences or critics: Leonard Maltin found it "pretentious" and "unintentionally comic" and Daniel Rosenthal describes it as "providing the most risible chunks of modernised Shakespeare in screen history."

== Cast ==
| Actor | Role | Macbeth equivalency |
|---|---|---|
| John Turturro | Mike Battaglia | Macbeth |
| Katherine Borowitz | Ruthie Battaglia | Lady Macbeth |
| Dennis Farina | "Bankie" Como | Banquo |
| Peter Boyle | Matt Duffy | Macduff |
| Rod Steiger | Charlie D'Amico | King Duncan |
| Steven Wright | Sterling | Porter |
| Stanley Tucci | Mal D'Amico | Malcolm |
| Carl Capotorto | Don D'Amico | Donalbain |
| Michael Badalucco | Sal | Seyton |
| Robert Modica | Carmello Rossi | Ross |
| David Thornton | Philly Como | Fleance |
| Dan Grimaldi | Carmine | Caithness |
| Joseph Carberry | Leonetti | Lennox |
| Richard Petrocelli | Artie | Angus |
| Edward Gallardo | Manuel | Menteith |
| Joseph Ragno | Padrino Ricci | Siward |

== See also ==
- Macbeth on screen
- Cultural references to Macbeth
- Shakespeare on screen
