= Sangrador =

2003 film

- Theatrical release poster
- Directed by: Leonardo Henríquez
- Written by: Leonardo Henríquez
- Cinematography: Cesary Jaworski
- Release date: 7 May 2003
- Running time: 90 minutes
- Country: Venezuela
- Language: Spanish

Sangrador, also known as Macbeth, Sangrador, is a 2003 Venezuelan drama film written and directed by Leonardo Henríquez. Set in 1900s Andean Venezuelan gangland, it retells the story of Shakespeare's Macbeth.

The film had a poor critical reception and low box office turnout. It was selected as the Venezuelan entry for the Best Foreign Language Film at the 76th Academy Awards, but was not accepted as a nominee.

== Synopsis ==
The story of Macbeth, King of Scotland is reimagined in early-twentieth-century Venezuela; the king is represented as Maximiliano (Max), a gang member. The gang, who hide in the mountains and subsist by stealing furniture and artwork from transport vans, is first led by a man called Durán; Max is one of the youngest members but also a favorite of Durán's. At one point, Max sees witches in the mountains, who tell him that he will become the boss; shortly after this his wife, Mileidi (or Milady), convinces him to kill Durán. Scared of the power and position he now holds, Max's mental state deteriorates.

In the book Shakespeares After Shakespeare: An Encyclopedia of the Bard in Mass Media and Popular Culture, the film is described as a "predominantly faithful version" of the story; in the book Shakespeare on screen: Macbeth, the film is referred to as a "loose adaptation".

== Cast ==
The cast of the film is from the Rajatabla theatre company, "the most Shakespearean company in Venezuela"; the main characters are played by Daniel Alvarado (as Max) and Karina Gómez (as Mileidi/Milady; pronounced m'lady). Durán is played by Alfonso Rivas. Other principal cast members are Leonardo Villalobos and Gerardo Luongo.

== Production ==
Leonardo Henríquez wrote the screenplay for Sangrador based on the Shakespeare play Macbeth. The film, which he also directed, is his third feature. He has said that he was experimenting with the story of Macbeth and the language of Shakespeare, saying that "although one of the reasons for making this film was to get into the aesthetic aspects of Macbeth", he also wanted to "[learn] from its perfect dramaturgy" and "see how far a playwright [Shakespeare] so alien, so embedded in his time, can cross the border of language and historical complexities." Henríquez also said at the time of the film's release that he thought the story of "a desperate madman [clumsy] for power" would be accessible in Latin America.

The film was made in 2000 for less than $300,000, filming primarily in the southwestern Andes region of Venezuela, and was intended for release in 2002; its release date was pushed back many times and it was screened at many international film festivals before being shown in its own country. Ultimately, only two films were released in Venezuela in 2002; Sangrador was the only release in 2003. It is in black-and-white, with cinematography by Cesary Jaworski, art direction by Diego Rísquez, and sound direction by Stefano Gramito. It was filmed on 35 mm movie film.

== Reception ==
=== Public and critical response ===
The film saw a year-end box office attendance of 31, earning Bs.120,800; by 2016 its total box office attendance was 142 people, and it had made Bs.432,550 during public release. However, it was submitted in 2003 as the Venezuelan entry for the Academy Award for Best Foreign Language Film, not being nominated, and was nominated as the Best Spanish Language Film at the 2004 Goya Awards.

A review in Republica said that it was both a bad adaptation, referring to it as a "disgusting and appalling version of a great work", and a bad film. The review mainly sees the attempt at adaptation as bad for the film, saying that it is worse off for this; it does not stay close to the original; is "pretentious"; and will be scrutinized more for tackling such a famous work, thus exposing more failings. The review also criticizes the choice to make the film aesthetically black-and-white, suggesting this conflicts with the title (which means "bleeder") and noting that it makes the audience expect more depth than is present. Though accepting there were budget restrictions that caused extras to play living trees, the review criticizes the creative team for being too ambitious within their limits. The review generally criticizes the performances. In addition, it writes that some of Alvarado's speeches are good, but are responded to with such poor delivery that it becomes humorous; Gómez is praised for her acting skills and capturing the character of Lady Macbeth, but the reviewer equally notes that having one good actor among a poor cast makes the performances noticeably clash. Relating to the technological side, the reviewer notes the cinematography is good but also clashes with poorer aspects, and heavily criticizes the sound. Though the review repeatedly commends the effort and dedication of the production, it concludes that the film is bad.

=== Academic analysis ===
In academic literature, Diana Medina Meléndez wrote that the film began a wave of early-21st-century adaptations made in the country. Inmaculada Gordillo Álvarez notes that it is among the film adaptations that have taken the story of Macbeth and used it to frame a localized narrative.

Hatchuel, Vienne-Guerrin, and Bladen write that the three witches are shown as naked, young and attractive, and that they have animal tattoos. This is imagery used in a later adaptation of Macbeth, which the authors see as "beyond a simple coincidence". The film is included in their analysis of modern adaptations choosing to make the witches attractive, suggested as fulfilling modern genre expectations. Mark Thornton Burnett finds that the film makes use of the Venezuelan landscape to reflect both the main character's internal struggle, through cloud forests, and the landscape of the original play, through nearby plains; he also writes that the "glimpses of fortifications" of the film show the real threat to the gang is from the landscape rather than outside people.

In their book, Levenson and Ormsby write that the portrayal of Max veers into folk-heroism, bringing to mind national figures like Simón Bolívar and Hugo Chávez. They add that the play being a "political tragedy" has been used in the film "at a number of registers [...] to reflect on militaristic authoritarianism in an explicitly Venezuelan guise", also using imagery of the Archangel Michael commanding a heavenly army. Further from this, the authors note that the film is characterized by extensive Catholic imagery.

== See also ==
- List of submissions to the 76th Academy Awards for Best Foreign Language Film
- List of Venezuelan submissions for the Academy Award for Best Foreign Language Film
- Cultural references to Macbeth
- Macbeth on screen
