= Campaign (book) =

Book

- Illustrator: Shia LaBeouf (photographer); Karolyn Pho (photographer)
- Publisher: Grassy Slope Entertainment, Inc.
- Publication date: 2011
- Media type: Hardcover
- Pages: 64
- ISBN: 978-0-615-52986-8

Campaign is a coffee table book by Shia LaBeouf and Karolyn Pho which is attached to the project that accompanies Marilyn Manson's eighth album, Born Villain. It was released on August 28, 2011, by LaBeouf's Grassy Slope Entertainment production company through various retailers.

The book, accompanied by a short film DVD, is a visual accompaniment to Marilyn Manson and LaBeouf's Born Villain joint project. It is a collection of photographs taken by LaBeouf and his girlfriend, Karolyn Pho, of posters they put up to promote Born Villain, retracing the steps of a night LaBeouf spent traversing Los Angeles with Manson.

The book was made available for pre-order on August 28, 2011, preceding the screening of the Born Villain short film at L.A. Silent Theatre. By ordering the book, purchasers gained entry to a book signing event followed by private screening of Born Villain at 10pm of September 1, 2011, at Hennessey + Ingalls outlet in Hollywood.

== Promotion ==
Born Villain Campaign was launched on the streets of LA by way of illegally pasted handbills and via the website the CampaignBook.com by Karolyn Pho and Shia La Beouf. The website dedicated to the promotional campaign was discovered via a poster on August 27, 2011.

== See also ==
- Born Villain, the eighth studio album by Marilyn Manson.
- Born Villain, the short film by Shia LaBeouf in collaboration with Marilyn Manson.
