= Born Villain (film) =

2011 film by Shia LaBeouf

- Directed by: Shia LaBeouf
- Written by: Shia LaBeouf: Marilyn Manson
- Produced by: Shia LaBeouf
- Starring: Marilyn Manson; Miss Crash; Fred Sablan; Ashley Adair; Miss Crash
- Release date: August 28, 2011
- Running time: 6 minutes
- Country: United States
- Language: English

Born Villain is an American horror short film directed by actor Shia LaBeouf in collaboration with singer Marilyn Manson. The film features a series of vignettes involving Manson's character cutting women's hair, a doctor inserting an eyeball into a woman's vagina, and characters reciting passages from William Shakespeare's Macbeth. Born Villain is sound-tracked by the Marilyn Manson song "Overneath the Path of Misery".

A promotional trailer for the album of the same name (2012), Born Villain was conceived of after Manson and LaBeouf became friends at a concert by The Kills. In crafting the film, the duo drew inspiration from theology, Macbeth, and the films Un Chien Andalou (1929) and The Holy Mountain (1973). The short premiered at the L.A. Silent Theater on August 28, 2011; the screening could only be attended by people who had purchased copies of Campaign, a limited edition book by Manson, LaBeouf and Karolyn Pho. Upon release, the short received mixed reviews from critics. Some praised its power to disturb, while others found it dull. Born Villain has been made available for purchase on DVD.

== Background and development ==
The idea for the film originated after Marilyn Manson and Shia LaBeouf struck up a friendship at a concert by The Kills. The actor said that he found the singer "frightening" as a teenager, and that he had "always been intrigued" by his band's work. LaBeouf offered to direct Manson's next music video; in order to convince him he was a competent director, LaBeouf screened for Manson his directorial collaboration with American rappers Kid Cudi and Cage, Maniac (2011). Impressed, Manson then commissioned LaBeouf to create a video for the band. LaBeouf further expanded upon the project's genesis in an interview on Live with Regis and Kelly, saying that he went to see Manson at his home in West Hollywood, California, which LaBeouf described as a large movie theater where Manson spends much of his time viewing films. LaBeouf said that he and Manson watched several films together there, and discussed the "really eccentric ideas" they had for their video collaboration.

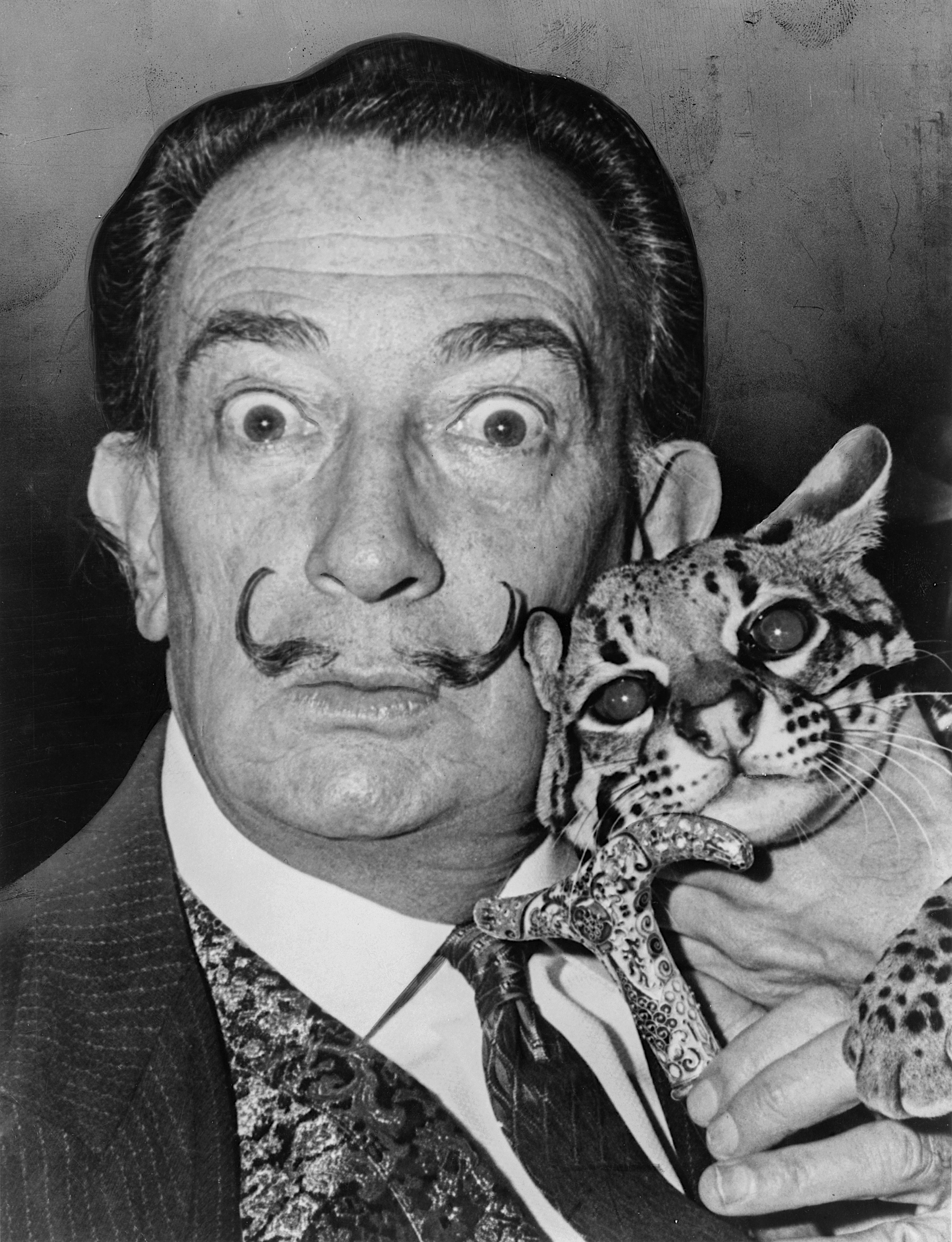
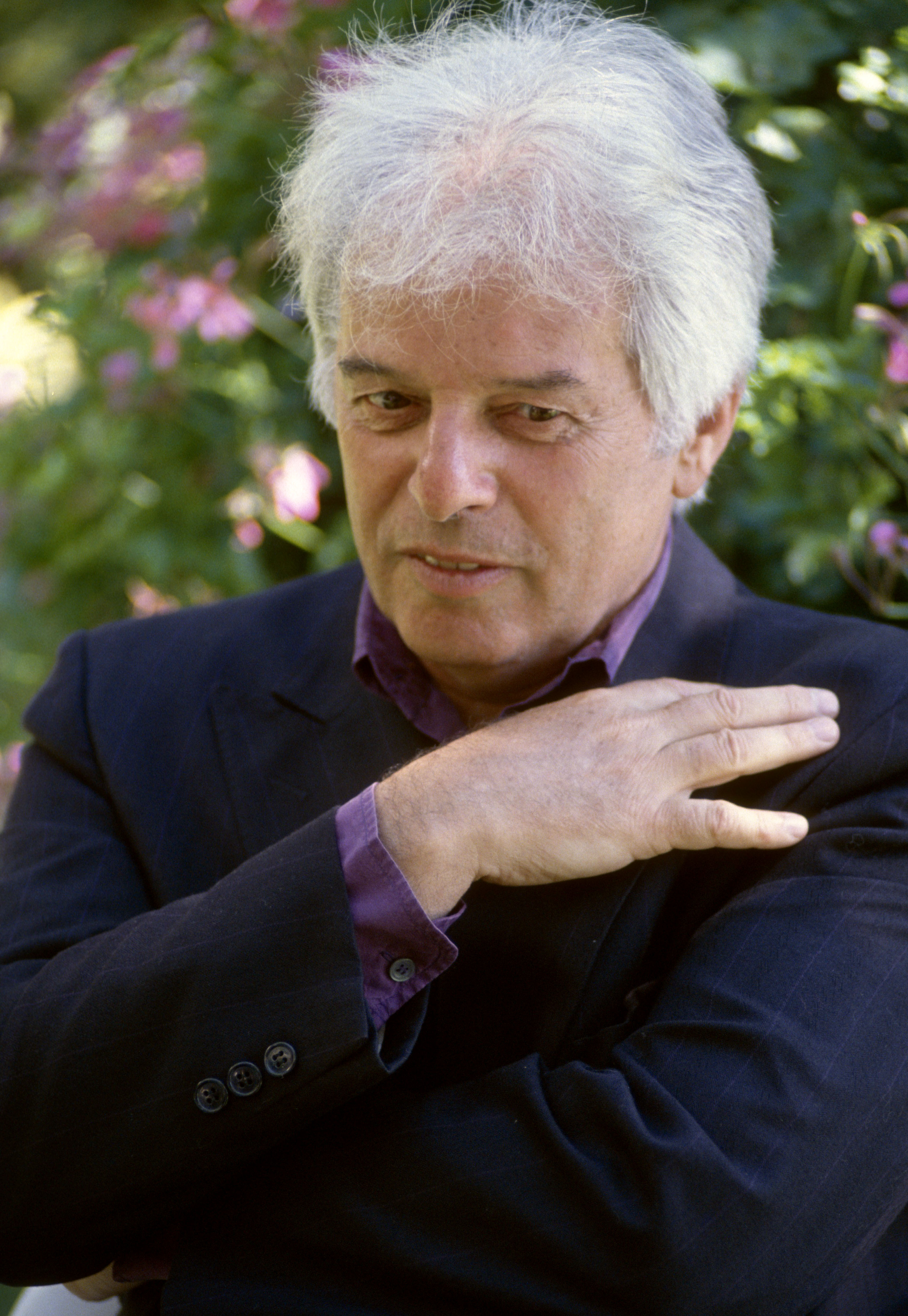
Films by Salvador Dalí (left) and Alejandro Jodorowsky (right) inspired Born Villain.

LaBeouf financed the film himself. It was inspired by William Shakespeare's Macbeth, Salvador Dalí's and Luis Buñuel's surrealist short film Un Chien Andalou (1929), Alejandro Jodorowsky's The Holy Mountain (1973), and what LaBeouf described as "heavy theology." Laney Chantal, the wife of Marilyn Manson member Twiggy Ramirez, served as the makeup artist for the short. Manson thought of the title Born Villain after telling someone "Gentlemen prefer blondes...but I'm a villain." The short's title was also inspired by the fact that all of Manson's favorite characters from literature and cinema are villains.

In an interview with Revolver, Manson said that his use of a Macbeth quote within Born Villain – "Life's but a walking shadow, a poor player that struts and frets his hour upon the stage and then is heard no more. It is a tale told by an idiot, full of sound and fury, signifying nothing" – could be understood as a mockery of LaBeouf, though this was unintentional. He added that he was unsure if LaBeouf was aware that the film could be seen as insulting him. In the same interview, Manson said that part of the reason he made Born Villain was because he viewed traditional music videos as "pointless", due to the decline of MTV.

On August 17, 2011, Fred Sablan, who appears in the film and also performs bass guitar on the parent album, leaked the film's official website on his Twitter blog; the website additionally announced the project's release date. Marilyn Manson drummer Chris Vrenna said that Born Villain contains short clips from the parent album, as well as its own score. The song "Overneath the Path of Misery" from the album was used in the film. Via MarilynManson.com, the band's frontman explained his intentions in creating the short:

"While looking to experiment in unlikely collaborations, I met Shia, and we spent a long night at my studio. After seeing Maniac, his short film, which is somewhat inspired by Man Bites Dog, I was astonished by his directing ability. So I shared quite a few of my favorite inspirations in art, literature, and obviously film. I was impressed with how Shia digested my world, and made what Id [sic] like to think, is both an homage [to] and a mockery of the history of cinema. We ended up writing a short film. The score is from my new album, and is, in the words of Macbeth, 'Full of sound and fury.'"

LaBeouf told MTV News that he enjoyed making the film, and that he would be unfazed if people who became fans of his through his role in Holes (2003) did not appreciate Born Villain, explaining: "I don't think my audience is the only thing I should exercise my artistic muscle for. I don't necessarily always do things for the audience; this is one of those." Mallika Rao of HuffPost said that Born Villain served as a trailer for the album of the same name.

== Synopsis ==
The film repeatedly quotes Macbeth by William Shakespeare.

Born Villain begins with a man (played by Marilyn Manson) cutting a pair of nude women's hair until they are bald. The movie then depicts an underage boy in white face makeup sitting next to an elderly man on a couch, who starts caressing the child's thigh. The man and boy begin physically fighting, after which Manson's character recites part of the "Tomorrow and tomorrow and tomorrow" soliloquy from Macbeth, as the two women with shaved heads stand behind him. A group of masked people, two of them wearing Nazi uniforms, applaud his recitation.

Manson's character then watches a blindfolded man and woman have anal sex in a glass cage, followed by a scene in which a woman fails in an attempt to shoot an apple off a man's head; she instead shoots him in the eye. The dismembered eyeball, which is still fully intact, is handed to the woman. Another woman recites Lady Macbeth's plea of "Come, you spirits, that tend on mortal thoughts, unsex me here". She is then seen kissing a man with no legs, and is applauded by a pair of topless blindfolded women.

Manson's character is shown piercing a long, thin needle through a woman's cheek, before he combusts as he blows out a candle. Apparently unharmed, he reappears as a doctor dressed in medical garb, and removes an eyeball from his mouth and inserts it into a woman's vagina. He then says "The wages of sin is death", before forcing a gun attached to a crucifix into the mouth of the man who molested the boy in white face makeup. As the man screams, the boy smiles, and Manson's character pulls the trigger. Facing the corpse, Manson's character quotes Macbeth: "Nothing in his life. Became him like the leaving it." He sits on a chair next to the legless man and a lion, before the film fades to black.

== Release ==
Campaign is a limited edition book by Shia LaBeouf (photographer), Karolyn Pho (photographer) and Marilyn Manson, which serves as a visual accompaniment to the film. Campaign was released in August 2011 by LaBeouf's Grassy Slope Entertainment, Inc., alongside DVD copies of the film. MTV reported that Manson and LaBeouf would appear at Los Angeles's Hennessey + Ingalls bookstore to sign copies of the book and screen the short. Attendance of the event was limited to 150 people over the age of eighteen, who were required to buy a copy of the book. Copies of Campaign were sold for $75 and featured of photographs of graffiti and cut-outs of LaBeouf and Pho placed around Los Angeles. The film had its premiered at the L.A. Silent Theater on August 28, 2011; the premiere was attended by actors Jon Hamm and Billy Zane. The short was later screened at Space 15 Twenty in Los Angeles, with entry guaranteed exclusively to those who purchased the book. Born Villain was also screened at the Studio Servitu in Los Angeles, a club co-owned by Miss Crash, a fetish model who appears in the film. The short was screened there as part of an art show where Manson debuted songs from the album Born Villain, Ramirez performed a DJ set, and artist Nick Kushner displayed some of his paintings, including a portrait of Manson painted in the artist's blood.

== Critical reception and analysis ==
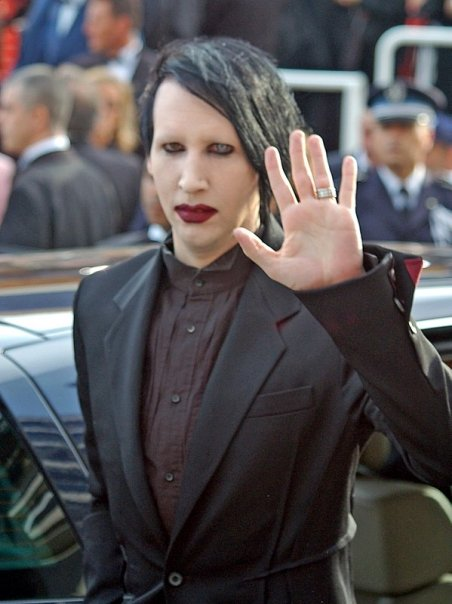
Critics praised Manson's continued ability to disturb audiences.

Upon its release, several critics praised its power to disturb. Loudwire's Joe Robinson called the short "the most interesting, challenging and envelope-pushing video Manson has made in a decade. It also may be his most disturbing, so watch at you own risk." Writing in Spin, Kevin O'Donnell said that Born Villain "proves the shock-rocker has not lost his ability to freak fans out" and is "sicker than ever," adding that the scene "where Manson pokes a needle into a woman’s cheek, might be the sickest thing ever captured in a music video. And the execution at the end is just plain terrifying." Lina Lecaro of LA Weekly felt that through the "arty, dramatic, salacious, [and] depraved" film Manson "reaffirms his 'shock rocker' status," though she was unsure of its meaning. For Billboard, RJ Cubarrubia reacted to the video by saying "Good news: Marilyn Manson is still terrifying".

Some critics praised LaBeouf's abilities as a director. Amos Barshad of Grantland praised LaBeouf for his "directorial chops" and for crafting a "effectively, overwhelmingly gross" film. Barshad felt that Born Villain's use of the Macbeth quote "[It] is a tale told by an idiot full of sound and fury. It signifies [sic] nothing" meant that the short was meaningless. The Chicago Reader's Miles Raymer said that "Born Villain is pretentious garbage, and it's fantastic....I think LeBeouf [sic] just might have what it takes to be a great B-movie filmmaker. This thing is so big and overwrought and blind to its own ridiculousness that it does what all great exploitation movies do, which is to go past being so bad that it's good to become something so bad that it's art." Raymer also liked Born Villain better than Maniac.

Other critics were less impressed. In Consequence of Sound, Chris Coplan found Born Villain's visuals too similar to the singer's previous work. MetalSucks' Axl Rosenberg criticized the film's appropriation of pre-existing sources, feeling that Macbeth is unrelated to Un Chien Andalou, a film which he considered far superior to Born Villain. Rosenberg further asserted that Manson did not understand the "Tomorrow and tomorrow and tomorrow" soliloquy. Max Feldman of PopMatters wrote that by collaborating with LaBeouf for the short and Johnny Depp for his band's cover of Carly Simon's "You're So Vain" (1972), Manson is feeding the consumerism and celebrity culture he used to criticize. IndieWire's Kevin Jagernauth and Metal Injection's Robert Pasbani dismissed the video as boring, with the former criticizing its music and the latter jokingly telling LaBeouf and Manson to commit suicide due to the short's poor quality.

== See also ==
- Macbeth in popular culture
