= Joe MacBeth =

1955 film by Ken Hughes

- Theatrical release poster
- Directed by: Ken Hughes
- Screenplay by: Philip Yordan; Ken Hughes
- Based on: Macbeth (1606 play) by William Shakespeare
- Produced by: M.J. Frankovich
- Starring: Paul Douglas; Ruth Roman; Bonar Colleano; Grégoire Aslan; Sid James
- Cinematography: Basil Emmott
- Edited by: Peter Rolfe Johnson
- Music by: Trevor Duncan
- Production companies: Film Locations, Ltd.
- Distributed by: Columbia Pictures
- Release date: 18 October 1955 (UK)
- Running time: 90 minutes
- Country: United Kingdom
- Language: English

Joe MacBeth is a 1955 British gangster film directed by Ken Hughes and starring Paul Douglas, Ruth Roman, Bonar Colleano, Grégoire Aslan and Sid James. It was written by Hughes and Philip Yordan, and is a modern retelling of Shakespeare's Macbeth, set in a 1930s American criminal underworld. The film's plot closely follows that of Shakespeare's original play.

The film was released by Columbia Pictures on 18 October 1955. It has been called "the first really stand out movie" of Hughes' career.

== Plot ==
Mob trigger man Joe "Mac" MacBeth assassinates Tommy, second-in-command to crime boss "Duke" Duca, on Duke's orders and then proceeds to his own wedding, where his bride Lily scolds him for being two hours late. As they celebrate their marriage that night at Duke's nightclub, fortune teller Rosie declares that Joe's destiny is to become the kingpin of the mob. The ruthlessly ambitious Lily is convinced of the fortune's inevitability, but Joe brushes it off. Almost immediately after Rosie leaves, however, Duke arrives and rewards Joe with a promotion to Tommy's old position and his prized lakeside mansion.

Duke's mob soon goes to war with a rival outfit run by the gluttonous Big Dutch. After Big Dutch's men turn the tables and make inroads on Duke's territory, Joe pays the rival boss a personal visit at a restaurant and secretly poisons a dish. Once Joe departs, Big Dutch devours the tainted food, then dies on the spot.

During an overnight party at the lakeside mansion to celebrate Big Dutch's demise, Lily continues to goad Joe into going after Duke, but Joe hesitates. The festivities end with Duke inviting Lily to go for a swim. Once in the water, Joe stabs his boss in the back and holds him under until he is dead, but he is shaken by the act and fails to remove the knife, forcing Lily to dive in and recover the murder weapon. In the morning, when Duke's bodyguards come to pick him up and he cannot be found, Lily claims to have discovered Duke's robe by the lake and suggests he drowned while swimming. Joe is immediately elevated to kingpin and he promotes his friend Banky to his right-hand man.

Banky's son Lennie resents Joe's rapid rise, asserting that his father served Duke long before Joe came along. He also openly casts suspicion on Duke's death. The loyal Banky beats Lennie for the insubordination, but urges Joe to set his son up with a small business so that his family can leave the criminal life. Later, Joe and Banky come across Rosie again, and she claims Joe is being overshadowed by his friend. The men laugh off Rosie's words, but shortly after, Joe hires a pair of hitmen from out of town to eliminate Banky and Lennie; Banky dies, but Lennie escapes, and Lily berates Joe for not doing the job himself.

At a banquet where Lennie unexpectedly shows up, Joe begins to be haunted by nightmares and visions of the men he betrayed. Lennie entertains plans of usurping Joe as the latter's erratic behavior disturbs the rank-and-file members. Meanwhile, Joe sends the hitmen to kidnap Lennie's wife, Ruth, and their daughter to rein the upstart in, but they botch the job. Lily discovers the bodies when she visits Ruth's house and is traumatized. The brutal act also alienates Marty, Joe's last ally in the mob.

That night, Marty warns Joe that Lennie is coming for him. Joe orders the hitmen to guard the mansion while he tends to Lily, but the mercenaries decide to make a run for it and are gunned down by Lennie. Panicked and paranoid, Joe closes himself in a dark room with a machine gun and starts shooting wildly at the slightest movements. When the doors to the room open, he fires at them and kills Lily. As Joe rushes to his wife's side, Lennie then personally executes Joe. Angus, the mansion's longtime butler, suggests that Lennie is the new master of the mansion and therefore the mob, but Lennie disagrees and tells Angus to look for a new job.

== Cast ==
- Paul Douglas as Joe MacBeth (Macbeth)
- Ruth Roman as Lily MacBeth (Lady Macbeth)
- Bonar Colleano as Lennie (Macduff/Fleance)
- Grégoire Aslan as Duca "The Duke" (King Duncan)
- Sid James as Banky (Banquo)
- Harry Green as Big Dutch
- Walter Crisham as Angus
- Kay Callard as Ruth (Lady Macduff)
- Robert Arden as Ross
- Alfred Mulock as 1st assassin
- George Margo as 2nd assassin
- Minerva Pious as Rosie (Three Witches)
- Philip Vickers as Tommy
- Mark Baker as Benny
- Bill Nagy as Marty (Seyton)
- Nicholas Stuart as Duffy
- Teresa Thorne as Ruth
- Shirley Douglas as Patsy

== Production ==
Philip Yordan's script was originally purchased by Eugene Frenke, who intended to produce the film for United Artists. Shooting was set to take place in Chicago in late 1947, with Robert Cummings attached to star. Later, Lew Ayres and Shelley Winters were floated as potential leads, with William Bacher producing. Ultimately, M. J. Frankovich produced the film for Columbia, having been made head of the studio's British branch in 1955.

Filming began 1 May 1955 at Shepperton Studios. Ken Hughes later said he "enjoyed" making the film: "I was terribly young, only 22. The cheek I had to be directing old timers like Paul Douglas and Richard Conte. Still, I think they liked that and I tried never to be arrogant. And it was one of the few scripts I picked up in my life that didn't require a great deal of work."

== Reception ==
The Monthly Film Bulletin wrote: "The idea of a gangster Macbeth is not in itself an unworkable one. The arbitrary transference of some characters and incidents from the story to a contemporary setting, in a version which disregards moral considerations and presents Macbeth himself as a slow-witted thug dominated by a greedy wife, amounts, though, to a wilful vulgarisation of the material. ... There is little else to be salvaged from this unattractive production; and Ken Hughes' direction, combining a 'B' picture slickness with a taste for portentous close-ups and artily angled shots, does little to make the film more tolerable."

The Daily Film Renter wrote: "Originality of conception is this American located, though British produced, subject's strongest and most striking attribute, taking Shakespeare's immortal tragedy of Macbeth for its basis, it translates it into free and fresh terms of modern American gangsterdom. Its situations spring from the Bard while its dialogue comes from the Bronx. Thus it aims at the best of both possible worlds, a popularly conceived subject for the millions and a delectable and chucklesome 'in the know' treat for the intelligentsia."

Kine Weekly wrote: "Grisly, yet fascinating and gripping racketeer melodrama. ... It was made in England, but its Hollywood co-stars and resourceful director leave nothing to chance and see that it compares more than favourably with the best American thick ear. Red meat done to a turn, it's certain to whet the appetite of the ninepennies. Excellent British thriller."

Picturegoer wrote: "James Cagney's gangsters had nothing on Shakespeare's. And it's a clever team of film-makers that hit upon this fact. ... It's amazing how well the blood and thunder tale fits modern times. ... It's a dark, sombre sort of film that takes its Shakespearian ancestry pretty seriously. But there's plenty of excitement. Paul Douglas's portrait of a man gradually disintegrating is superb. As the crook who is out to revenge himself on Macbeth, Bonar Colleano gives another of his vivid, loaded performances. But Ruth Roman, icily feline, doesn't quite measure up to her part."

Picture Show wrote: "Well acted and directed."

Variety wrote: "Joe Macbeth is far removed from the famous Shakespearean character, but there is an analogy between this modern gangster story and the Bard’s classic play. Although made in Britain, the film has an American setting. It is expensively mounted, expertly staged and directed with a keen sense of tension."

Geoff Mayer wrote in Historical Dictionary of Crime Films: "Although this bizarre gangster film was an attempt to update William Shakespeare’s play to contemporary America, it was filmed entirely in England. The innovative script by prolific Hollywood scriptwriter Philip Yordan contains many less-than-subtle alterations to the play... Joe MacBeth is a triumph of style over content."

== See also ==
- Men of Respect (1990), also a mob-themed adaptation of Macbeth.
