= Scotland, PA =

2001 bleak comedy crime film by William Morrissette

- DVD cover for the film
- Directed by: Billy Morrissette
- Screenplay by: Billy Morrissette
- Based on: Macbeth by William Shakespeare
- Produced by: Richard Shepard; Jonathan Stern
- Starring: Maura Tierney; James LeGros; Christopher Walken
- Cinematography: Wally Pfister
- Edited by: Adam Lichtenstein
- Music by: Anton Sanko
- Distributed by: Lot 47 Films
- Release date: January 22, 2001 (Sundance)
- Running time: 104 minutes
- Country: United States
- Language: English

Scotland, PA is a 2001 American black comedy crime film written and directed by Billy Morrissette as a modernized retelling of Macbeth. The film stars James LeGros, Maura Tierney, and Christopher Walken. The Shakespearean tragedy, originally set in Dunsinane Castle in 11th-century Scotland, is reworked into a dark comedy set in 1975, centered on "Duncan's Cafe", a fast-food restaurant in the small town of Scotland, Pennsylvania. The film was shot in Halifax, Nova Scotia.

== Plot ==
In 1975, Duncan's, a fast-food restaurant owned by Norm Duncan in the tiny hamlet of Scotland, Pennsylvania, hosts a variety of workers. Joe “Mac” McBeth is passed over for a promotion to manager by Douglas McKenna, who has been embezzling the restaurant's money. Three stoned hippies, one a fortune teller, inform Mac that they see a bank drive-thru style restaurant in his future as management. Mac and his wife Pat then play informants on McKenna, and Duncan recognizes the value of Mac's efforts on behalf of the restaurant. Duncan shares with the McBeths his plans to turn his failing burger joint into a drive-thru, and Mac realizes how profitable the drive-thru could be, after which Duncan is hit in the head with a refrigerator door and passes out briefly. Pat then decides to murder Duncan in a staged robbery. Mac and Pat attack Duncan to acquire the combination to the restaurant's safe, and Mac assaults Duncan, but is distracted by a vision of the three hippies, allowing Duncan to fall head first into a deep fryer that splatters and burns Pat's hand. Investigator McDuff arrests a local homeless man, to whom Pat has given Duncan's jewelry, and the restaurant is willed to Duncan's eldest son, Malcolm. Malcolm sells the restaurant to the McBeths who immediately realize Mac's ideas, and the restaurant's business takes off.

Investigator McDuff returns to Scotland, where the homeless man is cleared, and the McBeths focus their attention on Malcolm. Banko, Mac's friend, questions why Mac had never mentioned the drive-thru concept. Mac grows withdrawn and paranoid and on a hunting trip contemplates killing off Banko, but a vision of the three hippies dressed as deer distracts him. Pat becomes obsessed with her burn injury and accuses people of staring at her repulsive-looking hand, though no scar is visible. Mac then kills Banko with the homeless man's gun, and the body is discovered while new celebrity Mac gives a press conference. Mac calls on an hallucination of Banko to ask a question at the press conference and loses his sanity as the town watches on TV. He then returns to the woods to look for the hippies while Pat becomes deluded into thinking her hand is falling off. Mac then completely loses his sanity, answering and talking on the phone when no one is on the other end. In one conversation, the hippies suggest he kill McDuff's family. Mac grabs the sheriff's gun and orders the officer to call McDuff to the restaurant, where he then shoots McDuff, but the gun proves to be empty. They then wrestle for the inspector's gun on the roof of the restaurant and both fall off. Mac is impaled on the horns of his car. Pat self-medicates with alcohol, but then cuts her hand off and bleeds to death. McDuff takes over the restaurant, fulfilling his dream of working with food.

== Cast ==
- James Le Gros as Joe 'Mac' McBeth
- Maura Tierney as Pat McBeth
- Christopher Walken as Lieutenant McDuff
- Kevin Corrigan as Anthony 'Banko' Banconi
- James Rebhorn as Norm Duncan
- Tom Guiry as Malcolm Duncan
- Amy Smart as Stacy (Hippie #1)
- Timothy Levitch as Hector (Hippie #2)
- Andy Dick as Jesse (Hippie #3)
- Geoff Dunsworth as Donald Duncan
- Billy Morrissette as man walking his dog in front of the diner at the start of the film

== Production ==
In South Windsor, Connecticut, his hometown, "I (Morrissette) was 16 and worked at Dairy Queen, and I hated my boss. I had read 'Macbeth' that same year and started telling people that this play would be hysterical if it took place in a fast food restaurant and everyone in the restaurant is named Mac". Morrissette completed the script in 1998.

=== Press kit ===
The press kit for the movie was printed in the form of a CliffsNotes booklet, written by Professor David Linton of Marymount Manhattan College, which is what Morrissette was reading when he was studying Shakespeare.

=== Music ===
The soundtrack is made up of Bad Company songs because, in Morrissette's words, "the band's catalogue was surprisingly inexpensive".

== Reception ==
The film holds a score of 59% on Rotten Tomatoes based on 73 reviews, as of May 2025. The consensus reads: "Though it's not as good as it could have been, Scotland, PA shows cleverness at utilizing its premise."

Orlando Weekly called it "high-spirited", with "era-hopping giddiness"and "a rib-poking gambol".

The New York Observer called it "a trailer-trash version of Macbeth that should be avoided like an Elizabethan pox" and "grubby low-budget sendup of 70s pop culture".

Movieguide called it "a hilarious, modern re-telling of William Shakespeare's great tragic play" and a "morality tale".

Salon called it "a one-note movie — the note being a smart-aleck adolescent's idea of a Shakespeare parody".

SPLICEDwire called it "deliriously funny, fast and loose, accessible to the uninitiated, and full of surprises".

== Awards ==
The film was nominated for the Grand Jury Prize at the Sundance Film Festival in 2001.

== Adaptation ==
In 2019 it was announced that a musical adaptation would premiere Off-Broadway at the Laura Pels Theatre by Roundabout Theatre Company. The musical, directed by Lonny Price, features book by Michael Mitnick, music and lyrics by Adam Gwon, and choreography by Josh Rhodes. It starred Ryan McCartan, Taylor Iman Jones, Megan Lawrence, Jay Armstrong Johnson, Jeb Brown, Lacretta, Will Meyers, Alysha Umphress, Kaleb Wells, and David Rossmer.

== Sources ==
- Burt, Richard (2003). "Shakespeare, 'Glo-cali-zation,' Race, and the Small Screens of Post-Popular Culture". In Burt, Richard; Boose, Lynda E. (eds.). Shakespeare, the Movie II: Popularizing the Plays on Film, TV, Video, and DVD. London and New York: Routledge. pp. 14–36. ISBN 0-415-28299-3.
- Ebert, Roger (February 15, 2002). "Scotland, PA". RogerEbert.com.
- Fedderson, Kim; Richardson, J. Michael (2008). "Macbeth: Recent Migrations of the Cinematic Brand". In Moschovakis, Nick (ed.). Macbeth: New Critical Essays. Shakespeare Criticism. Vol. 32. New York: Routledge. pp. 300–317. ISBN 978-0-203-93070-0.
- Lehmann, Courtney (2003). "Out Damned Scot: Dislocating Macbeth in transnational film and media culture". In Burt, Richard; Boose, Lynda E. (eds.). Shakespeare, the Movie II: Popularizing the Plays on Film, TV, Video, and DVD. London and New York: Routledge. pp. 231–251. ISBN 0-415-28299-3.
