= Alexander Abela =

British-French filmmaker and producer

- Born: Alexander Abela; 30 November 1964 (age 61); Coventry, England
- Occupations: Director, producer, Editor, Cinematographer, writer
- Years active: 1997–present

Alexander Abela (born 30 November 1964), is a British-French filmmaker, producer and writer. He is best known for directing the live action films Makibefo, Souli and the animation film Zarafa.

== Personal life ==
He was born on 30 November 1964 in Coventry, England.

== Career ==
He studied physics and oceanography extensive with an ambition to be an oceanographer. He is a seasoned freediver and trained as a commercial diver (HSE Part I) as well. But in 1997, he began a film career instead of that.

In 2001, he directed his maiden film Makibefo, where he was also the producer and writer. The film has been shot in Madagascar in October 1998. The film casts with an English-speaking narrator, where all the roles are played by indigenous Antandroy people. After the success of the film, he made his second film Souli in 2004, which also received the critics acclaim and screened many film festivals. The film also revolved around a remote fishing village on the southwestern coast of Madagascar. In 2005, the film was nominated for the Grand Prix Award at the Paris Film Festival. In 2009, he co-wrote the animation film Zarafa with Rémi Bezançon, and released theaters in 2011. In 2012, he produced two more films: Ojo De Agua, and Ventilator Blues.

== Filmography ==
Year	Film	Role	Genre	Ref.
2001	Makibefo	Director, writer, producer	Film	
2004	Souli	Director, writer	Film	
2011	La dernière frontière	Director, writer, Cinematographer, Editor	TV movie documentary	
2012	Zarafa	Writer	Film	
