= Makibefo =

2001 film by Alexander Abela

- Directed by: Alexander Abela
- Written by: Alexander Abela
- Produced by: Alexander Abela
- Starring: Martin Zia; Neoliny Dety
- Cinematography: Alexander Abela
- Edited by: Doug Bryson
- Music by: Bien Rasoanan Tenaina
- Distributed by: Epicentre Films
- Release date: 17 October 2001
- Running time: 73 minutes
- Country: Madagascar
- Languages: Malagasy, English

Makibefo is a 2001 Malagasy black-and-white drama film written and directed by Alexander Abela. The director filmed the movie near the town of Faux Cap, Madagascar, with a single technical assistant. With the exception of an English-speaking narrator, all the roles are played by indigenous Antandroy people (few of whom had ever seen a movie before) who performed a largely improvised story based on William Shakespeare's Macbeth set in a remote fishing village.

== Plot ==
Two Antandroy men, Makibefo and Bakoua, encounter a witch doctor as they escort a prisoner back to their village across the desert. The witch doctor, using sikidy, prophesizes a series of future events, including Makibefo's role as the destined king of his people. On their return to the village, Makibefo sees the witch doctor's prophecies begin to come true. He shares the prophecies with his wife, and she goads him into killing their king, Danikany. Makibefo becomes the new king, but ambition and fear drive him to kill others in the village that might threaten his position. He eventually faces a revolt by the families and friends of his victims.

== Cast ==
- Martin Zia as Makibefo (based on Macbeth)
- Neoliny Dety as Valy Makibefo (Lady Macbeth)
- Jean-Félix as Danikany (Duncan)
- Bien Rasoanan Tenaina as Malikomy (Malcolm)
- Jean-Noël as Makidofy (Macduff)
- Randina Arthur as Bakoua (Banquo)
- Boniface as Kidoure (Thane of Cawdor)
- Victor Raobelina as the witch doctor
- Gilbert Laumord as the storyteller

== Reception ==
Variety reviewed Makibefo positively, calling it "an entirely fresh response to Shakespeare that should attract both fans of the Bard and B&W cinema."
