= The High End of Low Tour =

2009 concert tour by Marilyn Manson

The High End of Low
- Tour by Marilyn Manson
- Associated album: The High End of Low
- Start date: June 3, 2009
- End date: December 21, 2009
- No. of shows: 112 (planned); 108 (completed)

Marilyn Manson concert chronology
- Rape of the World (2007–2008); The High End of Low Tour (2009); Hey Cruel World... Tour (2012–2013)

The High End of Low Tour was a worldwide arena tour by American rock band Marilyn Manson. It was the twelfth tour the band embarked upon and the eighth to span multiple legs. The tour ran from June 3, 2009, until December 21, 2009. The only known tour date of the tour's seventh leg in 2010 was cancelled. During the last show in France, Manson announced that there would be no further tour dates in 2010.

In the vein of the album themes and imagery revolving around Manson's conception of life as a movie, the live counterpart of The High End of Low reflects this theatricality by simulating each song in the live tour as a different act. Replete with cinema-derived stage lighting illuminating Manson, the separation between "backstage"/"onstage" has been lifted to portray this cinematic effect; Manson reapplies his makeup front-and-center onstage, stagehands assist with wardrobe changes in full view of the audience, and the final illustration of this concept is that prior to each song's commencement afterwards, a stagehand emerges and signifies that each new act has begun by use of a clapperboard in front of Manson, as if to convey the filmic mantra of "lights, camera, action" and the song begins.

A new theatric stage was revealed in the first European leg of "The High End Of Low Tour". During "Great Big White World" Manson performed in an oversized white lightbox. The song was entirely sung behind the semi-transparent sheet, removed from the audience. "If I Was Your Vampire", which also deals with a similar lovelorn isolation, was alternately performed with this theatrical device on early dates of the tour. Marilyn Manson would also wear an all white hooded coat a stark contrast to his usual black attire for the show.

Marilyn Manson joined Slayer as headliners for the Rockstar Energy Mayhem Festival tour in 2009. The press release for the tour stated that "Manson is currently in the studio working on his seventh studio album scheduled for release May 18th on Interscope Records." On February 2, Rolling Stone confirmed the album had been officially titled The High End of Low.

After much fan speculation and no official announcement, Andy Gerold joined Marilyn Manson in the capacity of live bassist after former bassist Twiggy Ramirez switched to lead guitar duties. Gerold played his first show with the band on June 3, 2009, in Brno, Czech Republic. As of 2011, Gerold is still the youngest musician to play in the band, preceding former drummer Sara Lee Lucas by nearly seven years. During the summer of 2009, the band co-headlined the 2009 Mayhem Festival with Slayer. Later in October 2009, the band headlined the internationally advertised V-Rock Festival '09.

== Performance and show themes ==
Last Marilyn Manson presentation Of Eat Me, Drink Me, before the release of "The High End of Low", with the light up signage flashing the word D-R-U-G-S used on the Mechanical Animals Tour, Beautiful Monsters Tour and Rock Is Dead Tour.

For most of the tour, Manson wore the same sleeveless black shirt with a razor blade image on the front, as well as his signature black skin tight leather trousers. For most performances of "Devour" or "Great Big White World", Manson wore a white coat. For some performances of "Great Big White World", Manson would rip his way out of a box sealed in a plastic wrap. For performances of "Dried Up, Tied and Dead to the World", Manson would play guitar. For performances of "If I Was Your Vampire", "Arma-goddamn-motherfuckin-geddon" " Running to the Edge of the World" "Leave a Scar", Manson used a microphone in the shape of a knife, as he previously used during the Rape of the World Tour. For performances of "Four Rusted Horses (Opening Titles Version)", Manson burnt a Bible, as he has notably done during past performances of "Antichrist Superstar".

For most performances of "Pretty as a Swastika" and "Arma-goddamn-motherfuckin-geddon", banners baring the dollar sign logo were on stage. For performances of "Irresponsible Hate Anthem", Manson wore a Nazi helmet and held the flag of whichever country he was performing in. Also for performances of "Pretty as a Swastika", Manson wore the hat of a Nazi officer. During the European leg, for performances of "Devour" and "Coma White"/"Coma Black", a large promotional photo of his room was used as a backdrop. During European leg, for performances of "Cruci-Fiction in Space", Manson wore gloves with lasers attached to the fingers. For performances of "The Dope Show", Manson wore a top hat. For performances of "The Dope Show", dialogue from the film, Walk Hard: The Dewey Cox Story, would play before the song was performed. The dialogue features talk and usage of cocaine. Also for performances of "The Dope Show" and "Leave a Scar", Manson made use of film projectors. During the performance of "Running to the Edge of the World" on Barcelona, Spain, Manson sang to Evan Rachel Wood, with the knife microphone, as she pretended to bleed to death, lying on a bed that had been set up center stage.

- For performances of "Irresponsible Hate Anthem", Manson wore a Nazi helmet and held the flag of whichever country he was performing in.
- Also for performances of "Pretty as a Swastika", Manson wore the hat of a Nazi officer.
- During The High End of Low European leg, for performances of "Devour" and "Coma White"/"Coma Black", a large promotional photo of his room was used as a backdrop.
- During The High End of Low European leg, for performances of "Cruci-Fiction in Space", Manson wore gloves with lasers attached to the fingers.
- For performances of "The Dope Show", Manson wore a top hat.
- For performances of "The Dope Show", dialogue from the film, Walk Hard: The Dewey Cox Story, would play before the song was performed. The dialogue features talk and usage of cocaine.
- Also for performances of "The Dope Show" and "Leave a Scar", Manson made use of film projectors.
- During the performance of "Running to the Edge of the World" in Barcelona, Spain, Manson sang to Evan Rachel Wood, with the knife microphone, as she pretended to bleed to death, lying on a bed that had been set up center stage.
- During the show on December 14, 2009, in Manchester, England, former Marilyn Manson live bassist Rob Holliday joined the band to play "Little Horn".
- During the show on August 25, 2009, in Pomona, California, Kerry King of the band Slayer joined Manson to play "Little Horn" and "Irresponsible Hate Anthem".

== Set list ==
The most commonly played songs, in the order they were most generally performed, were:

1. "Intro"
2. "Cruci-Fiction in Space"
3. "Disposable Teens"
4. "Pretty as a Swastika"
5. "Little Horn"
6. "The Love Song"
7. "Irresponsible Hate Anthem"
8. "Four Rusted Horses (Opening Titles Version)"
9. "Arma-Goddamn-Motherfuckin-Geddon"
10. "Devour"
11. "Track 99"
12. "Dried Up, Tied and Dead to the World"
13. "Blank and White"
14. "Coma White" / "Coma Black (a) Eden Eye"
15. "Running to the Edge of the World"
16. "I Want to Kill You Like They Do in the Movies"
17. "We're from America"
18. "Leave a Scar" (contains intro from "Abuse, Part 1 (There Is Pain Involved)")
19. "The Dope Show" (contains intro from "Dewey Cox Cocaine")
20. "Wight Spider"
21. "Rock Is Dead" (contains intro from "Dancing with the One-Legged...")
22. "WOW"
23. "Great Big White World" (With "Fuck Frankie" intro)
24. "Sweet Dreams (Are Made of This)"
25. "Whole Wide World"
26. "Rock N Roll Nigger"
27. "If I Was Your Vampire"
28. "Tourniquet"
29. "The Beautiful People" (contains intro from "Baby, You're a Rich Man")

== Broadcasts & Recordings ==
It Is known that Multiple concerts were captured during this tour, though all the material has been archived.

== Tour dates ==
List of concerts, showing date, city, country, and venue
Date	City	Country	Venue	Opening Act(s)	Attendance	Revenue
European Festival Tour
June 3, 2009	Brno	Czech Republic	Velodrom	n/a	—	—
June 5, 2009	Nürburgring	Germany	Rock Am Ring	n/a	—	—
June 6, 2009	Nuremberg	Germany	Rock Im Park	n/a	—	—
June 8, 2009	Innsbruck	Austria	Olympiahalle	n/a	—	—
June 9, 2009	Bratislava	Slovakia	Incheba Expo	n/a	—	—
June 11, 2009	Dresden	Germany	Junge Garden	n/a	—	—
June 13, 2009	Derby	England	Download Festival	n/a	—	—
June 17, 2009	Porto	Portugal	Porto Portugal Coliseum	n/a	—	—
June 19, 2009	Bilbao	Spain	Kobetasonik Festival	n/a	—	—
June 20, 2009	Clisson	France	HELLFEST	n/a	—	—
June 22, 2009	Vienne	France	Theatre Antique	n/a	—	—
June 23, 2009	Geneva	Switzerland	SEG Geneva Arena	n/a	—	—
June 24, 2009	Linz	Austria	Intersport Arena	n/a	—	—
June 27, 2009	Gothenburg	Sweden	Metaltown Festival	n/a	—	—
June 28, 2009	Dessel	Belgium	Graspop Metal Meeting	n/a	—	—
July 1, 2009	Kristiansand	Norway	The Quart Festival	n/a	—	—
July 4, 2009	Sopron	Hungary	Volt Festival	n/a	—	—
Rockstar Mayhem Festival
July 10, 2009	Wheatland	United States	Sleep Train Amphitheatre	n/a	—	—
July 11, 2009	Mountain View	United States	Shoreline Amphitheatre	n/a	—	—
July 12, 2009	San Bernardino	United States	Glen Helen Pavilion	n/a	—	—
July 14, 2009	Auburn	United States	White River Amphitheatre	n/a	—	—
July 17, 2009	Phoenix	United States	Cricket Pavilion	n/a	—	—
July 18, 2009	Albuquerque	United States	Journal Pavilion	n/a	—	—
July 19, 2009	Greenwood Village	United States	Coors Amphitheatre	n/a	—	—
July 21, 2009	Bonner Springs	United States	Sandstone Amphitheater	n/a	—	—
July 22, 2009	Maryland Heights	United States	Verizon Wireless Amphitheater	n/a	—	—
July 24, 2009	Atlanta	United States	Lakewood Amphitheater	n/a	—	—
July 25, 2009	Noblesville	United States	Verizon Wireless Music Center	n/a	—	—
July 26, 2009	Tinley Park	United States	First Midwest Bank Amphitheatre	n/a	—	—
July 28, 2009	Toronto	Canada	Molson Amphitheater	n/a	—	—
July 29, 2009	Scranton	United States	Toyota Pavilion	n/a	—	—
July 31, 2009	Cuyahoga Falls	United States	Blossom Music Center	n/a	—	—
August 1, 2009	Pittsburgh	United States	Post-Gazette Pavilion	n/a	—	—
August 2, 2009	Clarkston	United States	DTE Energy Music Theatre	n/a	—	—
August 4, 2009	Mansfield	United States	Tweeter Center for the Performing Arts	n/a	—	—
August 6, 2009	Virginia Beach	United States	Virginia Beach Amphitheater	n/a	—	—
August 7, 2009	Camden	United States	Tweeter Center at the Waterfront	n/a	—	—
August 8, 2009	Hartford	United States	New England Dodge Music Center	n/a	—	—
August 9, 2009	Bristow	United States	Nissan Pavilion	n/a	—	—
August 11, 2009	Tampa	United States	Ford Amphitheatre	n/a	—	—
August 12, 2009	West Palm Beach	United States	Sound Advice Amphitheater	n/a	—	—
August 14, 2009	San Antonio	United States	AT&T Center	n/a	—	—
August 15, 2009	Dallas	United States	Superpages.com Center	n/a	—	—
August 16, 2009	Oklahoma City	United States	Zoo Amphitheater	n/a	—	—
North America
August 21, 2009	Paradise	United States	The Joint at the Hard Rock Hotel and Casino	n/a	—	—
August 22, 2009	San Diego	United States	House of Blues	n/a	—	—
August 24, 2009	Anaheim	United States	Grove of Anaheim	n/a	—	—
August 25, 2009	Pomona	United States	Fox Theater Pomona	n/a	—	—
August 26, 2009	Ventura	United States	Majestic Ventura Theatre (Cancelled)	n/a	—	—
August 28, 2009	San Francisco	United States	The Warfield	n/a	—	—
August 29, 2009	Reno	United States	Grand Sierra Resort	n/a	—	—
August 31, 2009	Spokane	United States	Knitting Factory	n/a	—	—
September 1, 2009	Missoula	United States	Wilma Theatre	n/a	—	—
September 3, 2009	Spokane	United States	Knitting Factory	n/a	—	—
September 4, 2009	Boise	United States	Knitting Factory	n/a	—	—
September 5, 2009	Magna	United States	The Great Saltair	n/a	—	—
September 7, 2009	Portland	United States	Roseland Theater	n/a	—	—
September 8, 2009	Victoria	Canada	Save-On-Foods Memorial Centre	n/a	—	—
September 10, 2009	Calgary	Canada	Southern Alberta Jubilee Auditorium	n/a	—	—
September 11, 2009	Edmonton	Canada	Shaw Conference Centre	n/a	—	—
September 13, 2009	Winnipeg	Canada	MTS Centre	n/a	—	—
September 14, 2009	Maplewood	United States	Minneapolis Theater	n/a	—	—
September 15, 2009	Milwaukee	United States	The Rave/ Eagles Ballroom	n/a	—	—
September 17, 2009	Toronto	Canada	Air Canada Centre	n/a	—	—
September 19, 2009	London	Canada	John Labatt Centre	n/a	—	—
September 20, 2009	Ottawa	Canada	Scotiabank Place	n/a	—	—
September 22, 2009	Montreal	Canada	Bell Centre	n/a	—	—
September 23, 2009	Quebec City	Canada	Pavillon de la Jeunesse	n/a	—	—
September 25, 2009	Halifax	Canada	Halifax Metro Centre	n/a	—	—
September 26, 2009	Moncton	Canada	Moncton Coliseum	n/a	—	—
Australia
October 5, 2009	Perth	Australia	Challenge Stadium	n/a	—	—
October 7, 2009	Adelaide	Australia	Thebarton Theatre	n/a	—	—
October 8, 2009	Adelaide	Australia	Thebarton Theatre	n/a	—	—
October 10, 2009	Melbourne	Australia	Festival Hall	n/a	—	—
October 11, 2009	Melbourne	Australia	Festival Hall	n/a	—	—
October 13, 2009	Sydney	Australia	Enmore Theatre	n/a	—	—
October 14, 2009	Sydney	Australia	Hordern Pavilion	n/a	—	—
October 17, 2009	Brisbane	Australia	Brisbane Entertainment Centre	n/a	—	—
Asia
October 20, 2009	Osaka	Japan	Zepp	n/a	—	—
October 21, 2009	Nagoya	Japan	Zepp	n/a	—	—
October 22, 2009	Tokyo	Japan	Zepp	n/a	—	—
October 24, 2009	Mihama	Japan	V-Rock Festival	n/a	—	—
Europe
November 6, 2009	Malmö	Sweden	Malmö Arena (Cancelled)	n/a	—	—
November 8, 2009	Oslo	Norway	Oslo Spektrum (Cancelled)	n/a	—	—
November 9, 2009	Stockholm	Sweden	Ericsson Globe (Cancelled)	n/a	—	—
November 11, 2009	Helsinki	Finland	Hartwall Arena	n/a	—	—
November 12, 2009	Saint Petersburg	Russia	New Arena	n/a	—	—
November 13, 2009	Moscow	Russia	B1 Maximum Club	n/a	—	—
November 15, 2009	Riga	Latvia	Arena Riga	n/a	—	—
November 17, 2009	Warsaw	Poland	Stodola	n/a	—	—
November 18, 2009	Berlin	Germany	Tempodrome	n/a	—	—
November 19, 2009	Cologne	Germany	Palladium	n/a	—	—
November 21, 2009	Hamburg	Germany	Alsterdorfer Sporthalle	n/a	—	—
November 23, 2009	Frankfurt	Germany	Jahrhunderthalle	n/a	—	—
November 24, 2009	Munich	Germany	Zenith Halle	n/a	—	—
November 26, 2009	Treviso	Italy	Palaverde	n/a	—	—
November 27, 2009	Milan	Italy	PalaSharp	n/a	—	—
November 29, 2009	Toulouse	France	Le Zénith	n/a	—	—
December 1, 2009	Lisbon	Portugal	Campo Pequeno bullring	n/a	—	—
December 3, 2009	Madrid	Spain	Palacio de los Deportes	n/a	—	—
December 4, 2009	Barcelona	Spain	Estadi Olímpic Lluís Companys	n/a	—	—
December 6, 2009	Lille	France	Zénith de Lille	n/a	—	—
December 7, 2009	Amsterdam	Netherlands	Heineken Music Hall	n/a	—	—
December 9, 2009	London	England	O2 Academy Brixton	n/a	—	—
December 10, 2009	London	England	O2 Academy Brixton	n/a	—	—
December 13, 2009	Birmingham	England	O2 Academy Birmingham	n/a	—	—
December 14, 2009	Manchester	England	Manchester Academy	n/a	—	—
December 15, 2009	Glasgow	Scotland	O2 Academy Glasgow	n/a	—	—
December 17, 2009	Nottingham	England	Trent FM Arena	n/a	—	—
December 18, 2009	Antwerp	Belgium	Lotto Arena	n/a	—	—
December 20, 2009	Luxembourg	Luxembourg	Rockhal	n/a	—	—
December 21, 2009	Paris	France	Le Zénith	n/a	—	—
