= WOW (Marilyn Manson song) =

Song by Marilyn Manson

from the album The High End of Low
- Released: May 20, 2009
- Recorded: March 2008 – January 2009
- Length: 4:55
- Label: Interscope
- Songwriter(s): Marilyn Manson; Twiggy Ramirez; Chris Vrenna
- Producer(s): Marilyn Manson; Chris Vrenna; Twiggy; Sean Beavan

"WOW" is song by American rock band Marilyn Manson. It is the ninth track from their seventh studio album The High End of Low (2009). Its title was revealed on April 7, 2009, in a blog which described both itself and another song from the album, "Arma-goddamn-motherfuckin-geddon".

== Music details ==
"WOW"
This song is an industrial-influenced song. A music video was produced for the song, however, it was not released as a single.

A blog by Metal Hammer describes "WOW" as "a grinding, NIN-tinged sex anthem. Genuinely filthy and intensely sexy, The Wow sees Manson riding a dirty Twiggy Ramirez bassline in an almost spoken-word style. Quirky keyboards interject all the way through the track while sexual female groans (occasionally spoken in German) swarm behind the crunching industrial backing track. The Wow doesn't have anything in the way of memorable hooks but it is the sort of track that would sound amazing in a goth stripclub...if one existed."

Reviewing for Thrash Hits, Hugh Platt stated that "for every killer track there's one like 'WOW', a gutful of sickly electro honky-tonk with Manson at his lyrically most self-absorbed." John Robb of The Quietus deems that the song "is very Iggy [Pop]; Iggy when he swerved and went industrial on The Idiot." In an interview with BBC Radio's 6 Music, Manson acknowledged this influence, and also explained the song has literary references to the 1868 Fyodor Dostoevsky novel The Idiot (which the aforementioned Iggy Pop record lifts its name from).

== Music video ==
On May 11, 2010, a music video for "WOW" was released to Manson's Myspace account. It was directed by Marilyn Manson and consists of nothing more than a two-second clip being looped for about six minutes. The clip shows Evan Rachel Wood, in make-up reminiscent of the Black Dahlia, playing with the strap of her dress. According to the video's description it was filmed in 2008, about a year before the album's release, and was a "torture production technique [Manson] used to write the song with the boys." Presumably this means the video existed before the song itself. Oddly the video continues for over a minute longer than the song.

== Trivia ==
- Manson had the word "WOW" tattooed on his right wrist in April 2009.
- The hollow whistling noise at the beginning of the song is thought to be Manson "snorting something — whatever it might have been" as a percussive instrument. The substance was presumably, cocaine.

== See also ==
- Marilyn Manson discography
