= The High End of Low =

Studio album by Marilyn Manson
- Released: May 20, 2009
- Recorded: March 2008 – January 2009
- Studios: Sage & Sound Recording; (Hollywood, California)
- Genres: Glam rock; industrial metal
- Length: 72:03
- Label: Interscope
- Producers: Sean Beavan; Marilyn Manson; Twiggy; Chris Vrenna

Marilyn Manson chronology
| Eat Me, Drink Me (2007) | The High End of Low (2009) | Born Villain (2012) |

Singles from The High End of Low
- 1. "We're from America" Released: March 27, 2009; 2. "Arma-goddamn-motherfuckin-geddon" Released: May 18, 2009

The High End of Low is the seventh studio album by American rock band Marilyn Manson. It was released on May 20, 2009, by Interscope Records. Multiple editions of the record were released by the label, each containing unique bonus tracks. The album's lyrics were largely inspired by the personal troubles experienced by the band's eponymous vocalist relating to his divorce from burlesque performer Dita Von Teese, as well as his later relationship with actress Evan Rachel Wood.

Manson first began work on the album with guitarist Tim Sköld. However, Sköld left the band when the vocalist reunited with former bassist Twiggy Ramirez. The album was produced by Manson and Twiggy (who dropped the Ramirez moniker) along with former Nine Inch Nails co-producer and keyboardist Chris Vrenna, as well as Antichrist Superstar (1996) and Mechanical Animals (1998) co-producer Sean Beavan. It was the last album to feature the band's long-time drummer Ginger Fish.

The record received mixed reviews from music critics, with several publications praising it as their best album since Mechanical Animals; although others were critical of both its length and more personal lyrical themes. The album debuted at number four on the Billboard 200, and was their second consecutive number one on Billboard's Top Hard Rock Albums. It also peaked at number six on European Albums, and within the top 20 in 18 other territories.

"We're from America" and "Arma-goddamn-motherfuckin-geddon" preceded the album as single releases. A music video for "Running to the Edge of the World" was also released, which was condemned as a perceived glorification of violence against women. The band, which featured former Wired All Wrong member Andy Gerold on bass, toured in support of the record. While promoting the release, Manson made a series of disparaging comments about Interscope, its artistic censorship, as well as its-then CEO Jimmy Iovine. It was the band's final album released by the label.

== Background and recording ==
Marilyn Manson announced in November 2007, while on the "Rape of the World Tour" promoting previous studio album Eat Me, Drink Me (2007), that the then-current incarnation of the band would begin work on new material by the beginning of 2008. This included that album's co-composer, Tim Sköld, as well as long-time drummer Ginger Fish, Chris Vrenna and Rob Holliday. The first leg of the tour was a series of co-headlining shows with American thrash metal band Slayer. Manson indicated that Slayer guitarist Kerry King and former The Smashing Pumpkins guitarist James Iha would be contributing to new material, along with Nick Zinner of Yeah Yeah Yeahs, who remixed previous single "Putting Holes in Happiness" for Guitar Hero III: Legends of Rock.

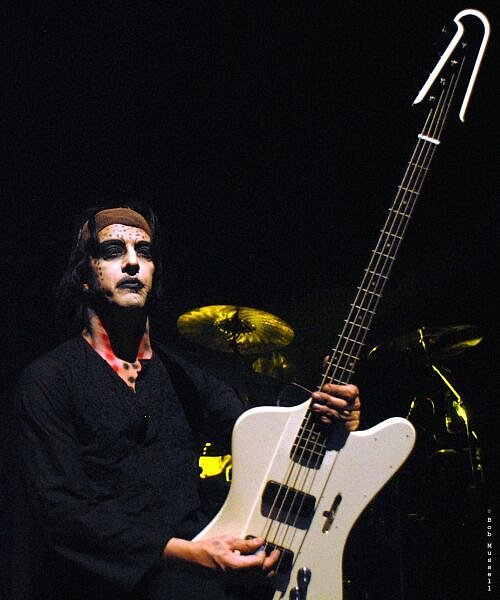
Twiggy performing with Marilyn Manson at the Hammerstein Ballroom during the "Rape of the World Tour"

However, the following month, Manson encountered the band's former bassist, Jeordie White (aka Twiggy Ramirez), while staying at The Hollywood Roosevelt Hotel. He had quit the band in 2002 as a result of creative differences during the recording sessions for their fifth studio album, The Golden Age of Grotesque (2003). It was announced in January 2008 that Twiggy would be rejoining Marilyn Manson as live bassist for the rest of the "Rape of the World Tour", which resulted in Sköld exiting the band. Manson explained: "There's too much tension there [between Twiggy and Sköld]. Those two couldn't be on stage with each other." Work began with Twiggy on new material in March 2008, although future collaborations with Sköld were not ruled out.

Former Limp Bizkit guitarist Wes Borland joined the band as a live guitarist for their August headlining show at the 2008 ETP Fest in South Korea, although Borland would quit to reunite with Limp Bizkit after just one other performance. He later said he was reluctant to be a "hired gun", citing the band's refusal to record any of the nine songs he submitted for their then-upcoming album. Manson clarified: "There was talk early on about collaborating with different guitar players on the record. That was before Twiggy and I got back together, because once Twiggy was back, there was nobody else, and I don't care what you have to offer—this was our record." Manson and Twiggy announced at the 2008 Scream Awards in October that the album was "pretty much done", and indicated it would sound more like Antichrist Superstar than the band's recent material. Manson later described the record as featuring "[lots of] guitar solos and brutal, reckless screaming", and as being "very ruthless, heavy and violent". The album was co-produced by Manson, Twiggy and Vrenna, along with Antichrist Superstar and Mechanical Animals co-producer Sean Beavan.

Manson recorded his vocals at his Hollywood Hills home studio between November 2008 and his January 5, 2009, birthday. He described the album as containing "extreme" autobiographical content relating to the dissolution of both his marriage to burlesque artist Dita Von Teese, and his later relationship with then-19-year old actress Evan Rachel Wood, explaining: "Some of the things I say here, it's sad to say them—they're relationship-destroying statements. Some of it is stuff I should have said to my ex-wife. Some are things I've never said to the world." Manson used his home as a canvas to document the disintegration of his relationship with Wood, writing the album's lyrics on walls and coupling them with paintings and drawings, as well as used condoms, bags of cocaine and other drug paraphernalia. Much of the album's artwork was shot there.

== Music and lyrical themes ==
The songs on The High End of Low appear on the album in the order in which they were written. The album contains material which spans across a wide variety of genres, such as industrial metal, glam rock, garage rock, blues, country, and synthpop. Its first track, "Devour", is a mid-tempo rock song which begins with an acoustic guitar, with heavy drums and distorted, screamed vocals becoming more prominent as it progresses. It was written in response to the "Shakespearean ideal of romance" presented on Eat Me, Drink Me. Lana Cooper of PopMatters said the song "runs an emotional gauntlet", and could "very well be the most depressing break-up song of all time. The lonely plink of guitar strings being tuned give way to Manson's soul-wrenching eruption of "And I'll love you / If you'll let me". [But] he turns on a dime, and a few lines later is vowing revenge, spitting "I will blow your heart to pieces." Metal Hammer later included it on their list of the 10 most underrated Marilyn Manson songs.

This is followed by "Pretty as a Swastika", a "mosh pit-ready" heavy metal song. Manson described it as one of his proudest moments lyrically. According to Manson, its title was "something I said to a girl because of her complexion—with black hair, red lips and pale skin. I mean, it was a complex and poetic statement which soon led to intercourse, so I felt no reason for it to be seen as hateful or destructive." At the insistence of Interscope Records, the song was re-titled on the album's back cover. Manson was critical of this censorship, saying: "Rather than take it off the album, I decided to produce it on the sleeve with a different name, so it'll be sold in Walmart or wherever stores sell guns but are afraid to deal with lyrics. So I put "Pretty as a ($)", because all of their motivations are based on money." "Leave a Scar" was written by Manson "about and for Evan on the day we broke up. Maybe some of the things I say in the song are cruel, but it is how I felt at the time."

"Blank and White" (uncensored)
Uncensored version of the track. This audio sample contains a portion of the song's final verse, which was censored by Interscope on all officially released versions of the album.

"Four Rusted Horses" is a blues-inspired rock song, and was compared to the work of The Doors and Johnny Cash. Manson described its lyric as being "almost a nursery rhyme. [...] everyone thinks that I was singing about the apocalypse, but it's more just about the four of us, my band, that managed to survive through all of this, and where do we go from here." "Arma-goddamn-motherfuckin-geddon" is an uptempo rock song which was described by The Quietus as "classic Manson". Caren Gibson of Metal Hammer claimed that the song was reminiscent of "Chain Reaction" by Diana Ross, as well as the work of Depeche Mode. "Blank and White" deals with censorship, specifically the reaction to Time magazine's cover story "Is God Dead?", which saw protesters brandishing blank picket signs. The lyric "God is dead but god is still white / So shoot up the mall, the school or the president of whatever / Or whoever wants a fight" was censored by Interscope on all editions of the album. Manson has said that this made him happy artistically, as "the song is about censorship, and they censored [it]."

"Running to the Edge of the World" is a David Bowie-inspired ballad, which features Manson singing in falsetto notes during its middle 8. "I Want to Kill You Like They Do in the Movies" is a primarily bass-driven rock song. At over 9 minutes, it is longest song on the album. Its lyrics document the disintegration of Manson's relationship with Wood, and his fantasies of "smashing her skull in with a sledgehammer." It was one of the first tracks the band recorded for The High End of Low, and was originally 25 minutes long. Reluctant to release a double album, they re-recorded a shorter version following the completion of the album's final song, "15", with Manson asking the band: "How many minutes do I have left on this CD [...]? And it was 9 minutes. I said, 'Roll it, I'm going to sing it.' What appears on the record is one [unedited] performance."

"WOW" is an industrial dance song, and Manson has described it as a turning point for the album, explaining: "The first half of the record is kind of bitter and angry, but there's a confidence that starts to rebuild itself [at "WOW"]. I wanted to do a song that represented who I am, and why I started doing this in the first place." Manson plays a one-stringed guitar on the song, which also features the sound of him "snorting lines of something - whatever it might have been - as a percussion instrument." In a review of the leaked demo, which was originally titled "The WoW", James Gill of Metal Hammer described it as "genuinely filthy and intensely sexy. [...] It doesn't have anything in the way of memorable hooks, but it's the sort of track that would sound amazing in a goth strip club... if one existed." "Wight Spider" is one of the heaviest songs on the album, and has been compared to the work of Mastodon. Metal Hammer also said of the track: "whether conscious or not, what [the band] learned from Trent Reznor is back: the track builds and builds without changing direction." "Unkillable Monster" is a down-tempo rock song which alternates between a quiet-verse and loud-chorus structure, and features layered, distorted vocals and guitars.

"We're from America" is the most overtly political song on the album, referencing various aspects of neoconservatism in its lyrics, such as pro-war and anti-abortion rhetoric. "I Have to Look Up Just to See Hell" was described by The Quietus as a "maggot-infested ride into the trough of melancholy." The penultimate track, "Into the Fire", portrays the vocalists' mental state on Christmas—wherein he unsuccessfully attempted to contact Wood 158 times, and cut himself on the hands or face with a razorblade for each corresponding attempt. It was the original album closer, with Manson describing it as a "glorious epic that I think will make Twiggy forever recognized as a guitar hero." The album's final song, "15", was completed on Manson's January 5 birthday. He called it "the most important song that's been written by Marilyn Manson as an entity. It's the most unusual song I have ever heard. I thought that the album was done, [...] but what was happening in my life had not resolved itself. So on January 5, one five, I sang '15', and the lyrics tell the story of that day."

== Release and promotion ==
The title of the album was revealed through the 'Smoking Section' of Rolling Stone magazine on February 2, 2009, where it was also announced that a music video would be filmed for the track "I Want to Kill You Like They Do in the Movies". Throughout March, five rough mixes of songs from the album were leaked. In an interview with a fansite, Chris Vrenna said of the leak: "I hate stealing of music in any form. If a band chooses to put tracks online, that's great. [...] I think true fans know that usually songs found online before the record is released are rough mixes, and will wait to hear the music the way the artist intended." "We're from America" was released as a free download on the band's website from March 27, with a one-track digital single released through online retailers on April 7. A CD single was released on April 14, and was exclusively sold at Hot Topic, the single CD also featured an alternate version of the song Four Rusted Horses. It peaked at number three on Billboard's Hot Singles Sales, spending six weeks on the chart.

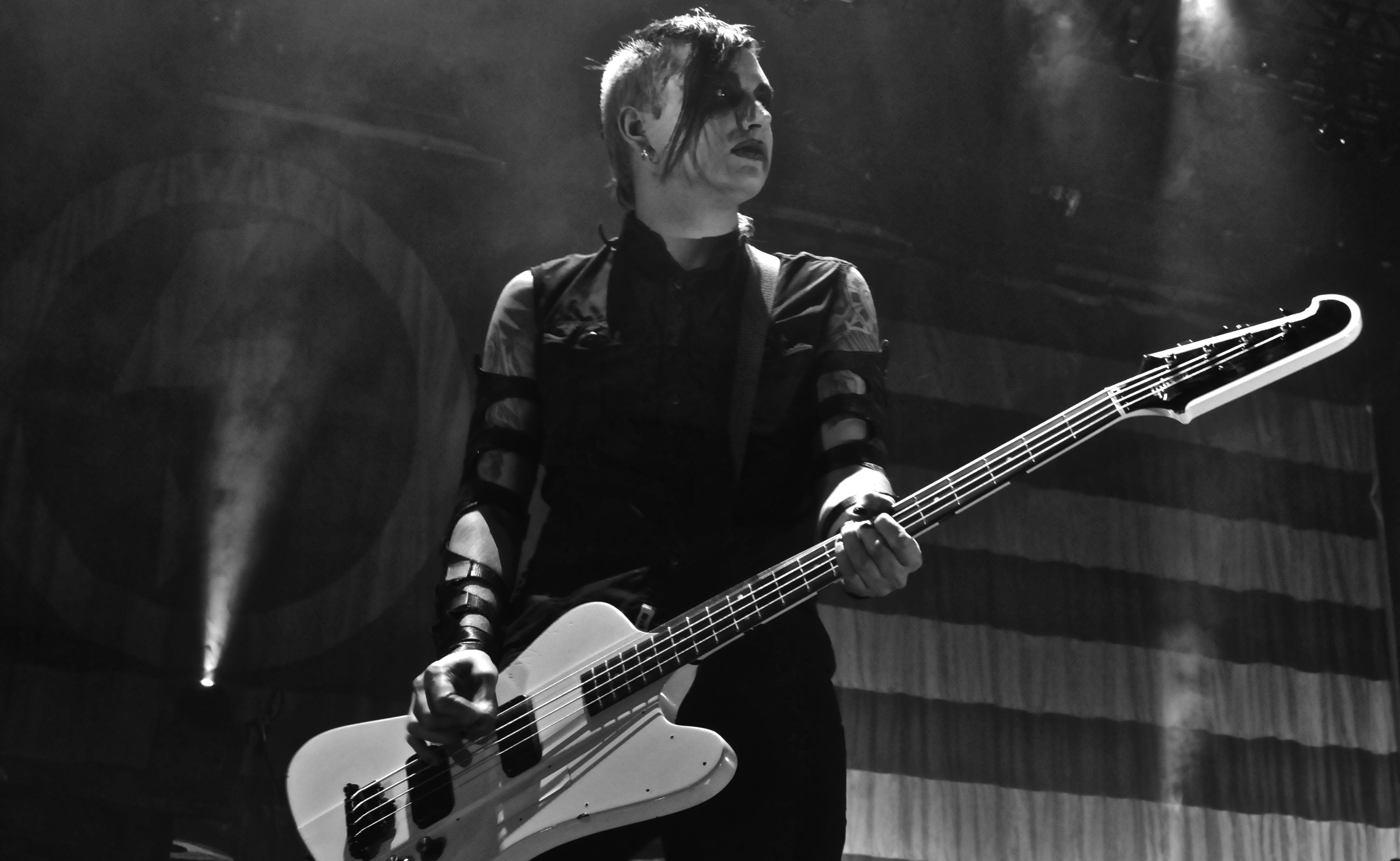
Former Wired All Wrong member Andy Gerold performing bass with the band at Mayhem Festival 2009

"Arma-goddamn-motherfuckin-geddon" was the album's official lead single. It was chosen as a single by Interscope after Manson played an instrumental version of the song to their artists and repertoire department, where an employee exclaimed: "This is gonna be a hit!". Manson is reported to have responded: "Well, I'm glad that you have no consideration for what I [might] put on top of it." A heavily censored version of the profanity-laced track, re-titled to "Arma... geddon", was serviced to radio in the US from April 13. It peaked at number 37 on Billboard's Mainstream Rock, becoming their lowest-peaking single on that chart in the process. A music video, directed by Los Angeles-based filmmaker and photographer Delaney Bishop, premiered on the website of British music magazine NME on May 14. Delaney had previously directed the 2005 short film The Death of Salvador Dali, which starred Manson's ex-wife, Dita Von Teese.

The High End of Low was made available for streaming on the band's Myspace profile four days before its US release. The album was supported by "The High End of Low Tour". Rob Holliday did not rejoin the band, with Twiggy taking over on lead guitar and former Wired All Wrong member Andy Gerold performing bass. The tour was visually inspired by the art of cinematography production, and featured cinema-derived stage lighting. Manson removed the distinction between on- and off-stage, with stagehands reapplying the band members' make-up and assisting with wardrobe changes in full-view of the audience. Prior to the commencement of each song, a stagehand would re-appear and signify that a new act had begun by using a clapperboard in front of Manson.

=== Aftermath ===
Prior to the album's release, Manson made a series of disparaging comments regarding Interscope and its artistic censorship; as well as its then-CEO Jimmy Iovine, who Manson said "wasn't smart enough to understand what [we] do." He also accused the label of caring more about Vitamin Water [the private equity venture of Interscope-signed 50 Cent] than music. Several days after the album's release, Trent Reznor – who, as of 2015, remains friends and business partners with Iovine – called Manson a "dopey clown", and said that "He is a malicious guy and will step on anybody's face to succeed and cross any line of decency." Manson responded by accusing Reznor of professional jealousy, saying: "Since I've known Trent, he's always let his jealousy and bitterness for other people get in the way. I'm not talking about me—I sat back and watched him be jealous of Kurt Cobain and Billy Corgan and a lot of other musicians in the past. I just don't find time to do that. I stopped thinking about him a while back."

While promoting the album in the UK in June 2009, Manson appeared inebriated in a series of interviews. An interview for Alan Carr: Chatty Man recorded during this period remains unaired, reportedly due to graphic language and content, as well as partial nudity. The following month, Manson issued a death threat against journalists whom he accused of making "cavalier statement[s] about me and my band." On a blog post on the band's Myspace profile, he wrote: "I will personally, or with my fans' help, greet them at their home and discover just how much they believe in their freedom of speech." A music video for "Running to the Edge of the World" – in which Manson beats a Wood lookalike to death – was released on November 4, and was condemned as a perceived glorification of violence against women.

The band parted ways with Interscope on December 3. On parting with the label, Manson said: "a lot of the creative control on which my hands were tied [has been regained]", and indicated that the band had started work on new material while touring. He also confirmed that he had rekindled his relationship with Wood. The band's long-time drummer Ginger Fish stepped down as a member of Marilyn Manson in February 2011.

== Critical reception ==
Professional ratings
Aggregate scores
| Source | Rating |
|---|---|
| Metacritic | 58/100 |
Review scores
| Source | Rating |
| AllMusic | 2.5/5 stars |
| Entertainment Weekly | C+ |
| The Guardian | 1/5 stars |
| IGN | 6.8/10 |
| Los Angeles Times | 3/5 stars |
| NME | 1.5/5 stars |
| PopMatters | 7/10 |
| Q | 3/5 stars |
| Rolling Stone | 2.5/5 stars |
| Spin | 8/10 |

The album received mixed reviews upon release. At Metacritic, which assigns a normalized rating out of 100 to reviews from mainstream critics, the album received an average score 58, based on 11 reviews, which indicates "generally mixed or average reviews". It also holds an aggregate score of 4.6 out of 10 at AnyDecentMusic?, based on 8 reviews.

The album was acclaimed by several publications. Spin writer Doug Brod referred to it as the band's best record since Mechanical Animals. Ed Power of Hot Press and John Earls of Planet Sound both rated the album 8 out of 10 and also compared the two releases, with the latter complimenting The High End of Low's "strutting glam and magnificently "over the top" ballads". In another 8 out of 10 review, Amy Sciarretto of Ultimate Guitar noted Twiggy's return to the band, and claimed that he "must be the catalyst sparking Manson's creative drive and gears, because [Manson] hasn't sounded this delightfully or determinedly pissed in quite a long time." Similarly, BBC Music concluded that Twiggy's involvement saw the band resurrected after Eat Me, Drink Me, which they called "lacklustre", and said that the album provided a pointed satirical commentary on modern America. Los Angeles Times reviewer Mikael Wood complimented its production, describing how the band had "sculpted a sound both harder-hitting and more finely detailed than on any previous Marilyn Manson record." Allison Stewart from The Washington Post praised the album for its personal lyrical content, contending that Manson's divorce from Von Teese had led to a new musical high.

Other reviewers criticized the album for its length, the level of experimentation, as well as its more personal lyrical themes. Rolling Stone reviewer Jody Rosen gave the album a mediocre review, citing its diminished shock value when compared to the band's previous material. Rosen considered the ballads to be the album's best songs, as they illustrated a more endearing depiction of Manson–as a melancholic human, rather than the Antichrist Superstar. Phil Freeman of AllMusic criticized the lack of variety on the album. He also criticized its lyrics, saying that they "feel like [Manson's] trying to convince himself as much as the audience." Entertainment Weekly called the album "occasionally satisfying", but said it was "unlikely to leave even a superficial cut."

The album received some of its most negative reviews from the British and Irish press. A review for NME was critical of the album's personal lyrics, and claimed that Manson had emasculated himself by opening up. In a one-star review, The Guardian called the album unconvincing, and criticized it for a lack of experimentation; whilst Entertainment.ie writer Lauren Murphy chastised several songs for sounding too experimental and "completely misplaced", summarizing: "If he'd stuck to what he was good at – ear-piercing yelps, liberal dashes of real controversy and big, brawny metal songs with tough beats – he may have [had] a 'comeback' on his hands." Conversely, Mayer Nissim from Digital Spy commended the album for its diversity, but was critical of its length and "ill-advised attempts at stadium anthems." He awarded the album three stars out of five and said: "It's far from awful, but not for the first time, you can't help but feel that Manson could do so much better."

== Commercial performance ==
The High End of Low debuted at number four on the Billboard 200 as the highest new entry that week, with first-week sales of 49,000 copies. Despite reaching a higher charting position than their last studio album, Eat Me, Drink Me, which debuted at number eight, this was the band's lowest opening-week figure since the live album The Last Tour on Earth opened with 26,000 copies in 1999. The album also peaked at number two on both Top Rock Albums and Top Alternative Albums, and was their second consecutive number-one album on Top Hard Rock Albums. As of February 2012, The High End of Low had sold over 148,000 copies in the US. In Japan, the album debuted at number nine on the Oricon Albums Chart, selling 10,583 copies in its first week.

== Track listing ==
All lyrics are written by Marilyn Manson; all music is composed by Twiggy and Chris Vrenna, except "Wight Spider" by Manson, Twiggy and Vrenna.

The High End of Low – Standard edition
| No. | Title | Length |
|---|---|---|
| 1. | "Devour" | 3:45 |
| 2. | "Pretty as a Swastika" ( (Note: Pretty as a Swastika is censored on most releases as "Pretty as a ($)".)) | 2:45 |
| 3. | "Leave a Scar" | 3:54 |
| 4. | "Four Rusted Horses" | 5:00 |
| 5. | "Arma-goddamn-motherfuckin-geddon" | 3:39 |
| 6. | "Blank and White" | 4:27 |
| 7. | "Running to the Edge of the World" | 6:25 |
| 8. | "I Want to Kill You Like They Do in the Movies" | 9:01 |
| 9. | "WOW" | 4:55 |
| 10. | "Wight Spider" | 5:32 |
| 11. | "Unkillable Monster" | 3:43 |
| 12. | "We're from America" | 5:04 |
| 13. | "I Have to Look Up Just to See Hell" | 4:11 |
| 14. | "Into the Fire" | 5:14 |
| 15. | "15" | 4:20 |
| Total length: | | 72:03 |

The High End of Low – Independent record store version (bonus track)
| No. | Title | Length |
|---|---|---|
| 16. | "Pretty as a Swastika" (Alternate Version) | 2:26 |

The High End of Low – International edition (bonus track)
| No. | Title | Length |
|---|---|---|
| 16. | "Arma-goddamn-motherfuckin-geddon" (Teddybears Remix) | 3:30 |

The High End of Low – France virgin version (bonus track)
| No. | Title | Length |
|---|---|---|
| 17. | "Arma-goddamn-motherfuckin-geddon" (Clown/Slipknot Remix Fuck the Goddamn TV and Radio Remix) | 4:23 |

The High End of Low – Deluxe edition (bonus disc)
| No. | Title | Length |
|---|---|---|
| 1. | "Arma-goddamn-motherfuckin-geddon" (Teddybears Remix) | 3:31 |
| 2. | "Leave a Scar" (Alternate Version) | 4:02 |
| 3. | "Running to the Edge of the World" (Alternate Version) | 6:08 |
| 4. | "Wight Spider" (Alternate Version) | 5:28 |
| 5. | "Four Rusted Horses" (Opening Titles Version) | 5:02 |
| 6. | "I Have to Look Up Just to See Hell" (Alternate Version) | 4:07 |

The High End of Low – Hot Topic deluxe edition (bonus track)
| No. | Title | Length |
|---|---|---|
| 7. | "Arma-goddamn-motherfuckin-geddon" (Alternate Version) | 3:39 |

The High End of Low – Play.com deluxe edition (bonus track)
| No. | Title | Length |
|---|---|---|
| 7. | "Arma-goddamn-motherfuckin-geddon" (Clown/Slipknot - Fuck The God Damn TV and Radio Remix) | 4:23 |

The High End of Low – iTunes deluxe edition (bonus track)
| No. | Title | Length |
|---|---|---|
| 7. | "Fifteen" (Alternate Version of "15") | 4:17 |

The High End of Low – Japanese deluxe edition (bonus track)
| No. | Title | Length |
|---|---|---|
| 7. | "Into the Fire" (Alternate Version) | 4:34 |

== Personnel ==
Credits adapted from the liner notes of The High End of Low.

- Marilyn Manson – production, photography, art direction and design
- Twiggy – production
- Chris Vrenna – programming, production and engineering
- Sean Beavan – co-production, mixing and engineering
- Ginger Fish – piano on "Into the Fire"
- Delaney Bishop – photography
- Pete Doell – mastering (alternate versions only)
- Justin Hergett – recording assistance
- Ted Jensen – mastering
- Wesley Michener – recording assistance
- Mike Riley – photography and recording assistance
- Jeremy Underwood – recording assistance
- Liam Ward – art direction, design
- Jeff Witters – cover layout

== Charts ==
=== Weekly charts ===
| Chart (2009) | Peak position |
|---|---|
| Australian Albums (ARIA) | 12 |
| Austrian Albums (Ö3 Austria) | 6 |
| Belgian Albums (Ultratop Flanders) | 38 |
| Belgian Albums (Ultratop Wallonia) | 16 |
| Canadian Albums (Billboard) | 4 |
| Czech Albums (ČNS IFPI) | 13 |
| Danish Albums (Hitlisten) | 32 |
| Dutch Albums (MegaCharts) | 73 |
| European Albums (Billboard) | 6 |
| Finnish Albums (Suomen virallinen lista) | 9 |
| French Albums (SNÉP) | 9 |
| German Albums (Offizielle Top 100) | 11 |
| Greek Albums (IFPI) | 43 |
| Hungarian Albums (MAHASZ) | 17 |
| Irish Albums (IRMA) | 47 |
| Italian Albums (FIMI) | 18 |
| Japanese Albums (Oricon) | 9 |
| Mexican Albums (AMPROFON) | 34 |
| New Zealand Albums (RMNZ) | 8 |
| Norwegian Albums (VG-lista) | 26 |
| Polish Albums (ZPAV) | 31 |
| Portuguese Albums (AFP) | 22 |
| Scottish Albums (OCC) | 20 |
| Spanish Albums (PROMUSICAE) | 9 |
| Swedish Albums (Sverigetopplistan) | 15 |
| Swiss Albums (Schweizer Hitparade) | 6 |
| UK Albums (OCC) | 19 |
| UK Rock Albums (OCC) | 2 |
| US Billboard 200 | 4 |
| US Top Rock Albums (Billboard) | 2 |
| US Top Alternative Albums (Billboard) | 2 |
| US Top Hard Rock Albums (Billboard) | 1 |

=== Year-end charts ===
| Chart (2009) | Position |
|---|---|
| US Top Hard Rock Albums (Billboard) | 41 |

== Release history ==
| Region | Date | Format | Edition | Label | Catalog # | Ref. |
|---|---|---|---|---|---|---|
| Japan | May 20, 2009 | CD; digital download | Standard; deluxe | Interscope | UICS-9107 | |
| Australia | May 22, 2009 | CD; digital download | Standard; deluxe | Interscope | 0–602527–061825 | |
| Germany | May 22, 2009 | CD; digital download | Standard; deluxe | Interscope | 0–602527–061825 | |
| France | May 25, 2009 | CD; digital download | Standard; deluxe | Polydor | 0–602527–061825 | |
| United Kingdom | May 25, 2009 | CD; digital download | Standard; deluxe | Interscope | 0–602527–061825 | |
| North America | May 26, 2009 | CD; digital download | Standard; deluxe; Hot Topic deluxe | Interscope | B0013017-72 | |
