= Heart-Shaped Glasses (When the Heart Guides the Hand) =

Single by Marilyn Manson

from the album Eat Me, Drink Me
- Released: April 17, 2007 (Promo); April 24, 2007 (iTunes); May 25, 2007 (CD)
- Recorded: Hollywood, California, 2007
- Length: 5:06
- Label: Interscope
- Songwriters: Marilyn Manson; Tim Sköld
- Producers: Marilyn Manson; Tim Sköld

Marilyn Manson singles chronology
"The Nobodies: 2005 Against All Gods Remix" (2005)	"Heart-Shaped Glasses (When the Heart Guides the Hand)" (2007)	"Putting Holes in Happiness" (2007)

Audio sample
- "Heart-Shaped Glasses": file; help

"Heart-Shaped Glasses (When the Heart Guides the Hand)" is a song by American rock band Marilyn Manson. It was released as the first single from their sixth album, Eat Me, Drink Me released on June 5, 2007.

== Inspiration ==
When I wrote the song that's the single "Heart-Shaped Glasses" it was one of the songs that I really expected an immediate response from the record label from, in the way like 'of course that's a single' and it was almost embarrassing in the way that I thought it was so obvious. The song was written in a simple way, I was reading the book Lolita and it was something inspired by my current girlfriend Evan Rachel Wood who's obviously much younger than me, but having the sarcasm to make the point of that and showing up to visit me once wearing heart-shaped glasses which is the same as the Kubrick movie poster for the film Lolita and me saying what I say in the chorus of the song. I said that to her and I suddenly realized I should really write a song about that and it never occurred to me in my entire career, my entire life that, that's how you should write songs. It should be the part of your personality that you might feel guarded or too secret to put out the rest of the world.

— Marilyn Manson, BBC Radio One

== Release ==
Initially, "Putting Holes In Happiness" was set as the first single from the album, but this was changed, similar to the case of "Get Your Gunn". The digital single was released on iTunes on April 24 and also added to the player on Manson's MySpace page on the same date. The CD single was released in Germany on May 25, and in the United Kingdom on May 28. A thirty-one second preview clip was released on French radio website Radio France on April 9, 2007. The single was played again in full on April 11 (after being debuted on the same radio station days before), 2007 at 20:05 GMT on the French radio station Le Mouv'. The whole track was leaked onto the web as was apparent on several YouTube videos, which were revoked by the Universal Music Group.

On April 27, 2007, a 34-second clip of the video for "Heart-Shaped Glasses (When the Heart Guides the Hand)" was released on YouTube, featuring Manson and girlfriend Evan Rachel Wood kissing while drenched in blood. Later, the video appeared on Manson's official website.

On May 22, 2007, an exclusive single was released through Hot Topic, containing a different B-side than the other singles.

On May 23, 2007, Marilyn Manson and Tim Skold performed an acoustic version of the track on BBC Radio 1.

== Music video ==
The video officially premiered on the German website sevenload on May 8, 2007. It contains a 2:47 introduction featuring Manson and girlfriend Evan Rachel Wood kissing maliciously while having simulated sex and scenes of her being covered in blood, overdubbed with an instrumental of the Eat Me, Drink Me track "Evidence". At the 1:35 mark the scene cuts to Manson and Wood driving down a highway in the dark, Wood daring Manson to go faster, to which Manson proclaims "[I'm] going as fast as I can." Manson takes his hands off the wheel to take numerous pictures of Wood, who lifts her leg up to the wheel and holds a knife to her mouth while wearing heart-shaped glasses. The two kiss again, concluding the introduction, and the setting cuts to a club.

On stage, in front of a large crowd, Manson begins singing as Wood watches him intently, apparently masturbating, from the crowd (still wearing the heart-shaped glasses), while numerous photos begin to fall over the audience. Shots of the two driving are flashed throughout the video, as the scene once again changes, this time revealing Manson and Wood in a bed, drenched in what appears to be blood. The two begin kissing vigorously again before the final scene returns to the two of them speeding along the highway. The front of the car erupts in flames, and they continue along, kissing once again. Manson says "Together as one...", and Wood replies "Against all others", before they drive off a cliff and fall, the video ending as they crash.

The video was directed by Marilyn Manson using a 3-D system developed by James Cameron. During an interview on the French program Le Grand Journal to promote the album, Manson cited Trouble Every Day as a source of inspiration.

It had been rumored that the sex scenes between Manson and Wood were unsimulated. To make matters more confusing, in an MTV interview with Manson, he did not confirm or deny the authenticity of the depictions, at one point dismissing it:

There were two crews there: one that was mine and one that hated me. Everything that I wanted to do was technically wrong to the people who hated me, because of the stellar acting and performances that took place in the sex scenes. They considered it to be pornographic, because they thought there may or may not have been too much realism to what was being filmed.

— Marilyn Manson, MTV News

And at another point implying the possibility that the sex was in fact real:

And Manson admits the scenes — in which Wood moans like a banshee, at times — seem very realistic but wouldn't confirm fans' suspicions one way or the other. "It does look real," he said, with a telling snicker.

— MTV News

Shortly after the video was made in 2007, Wood stated in an interview that the sex act had not been real. In 2022, she said she had lied when making that statement, and alleged the sex in the video had been real and non-consensual, and that she had been "fed" absinthe prior to its filming. She also claimed Manson had instructed her to deny the sex was real to the media, and that she had complied out of fear. Manson denied the claim, with his lawyer saying the "simulated" sex scene was observed by multiple witnesses and "took several hours to shoot with multiple takes using different angles and several long breaks in between camera setups." He also said Wood was "not only fully coherent and engaged during the three-day shoot but also heavily involved in weeks of pre-production planning and days of post-production editing of the final cut."

== Track listing ==
CD single

1. "Heart-Shaped Glasses (When the Heart Guides the Hand)" – 5:07
2. "Putting Holes in Happiness" (Acoustic Version) – 4:10
3. "Heart-Shaped Glasses (When the Heart Guides the Hand)" (Penetrate the Canvas Remix) – 4:50
4. "Heart-Shaped Glasses (When the Heart Guides the Hand)" (Video) – 7:26

UK CD single

1. "Heart-Shaped Glasses (When the Heart Guides the Hand)" – 5:08
2. "Putting Holes in Happiness" (Acoustic Version) – 4:10

UK 7" vinyl and Enhanced CD single

1. "Heart-Shaped Glasses (When the Heart Guides the Hand)" – 5:08
2. "Heart-Shaped Glasses (When the Heart Guides the Hand)" (Penetrate the Canvas Remix) – 4:48

- The Enhanced CD uses the DigitalInsert service through https://web.archive.org/web/20180806234922/http://marilynmansonvault.com/ to provide extra content, which includes a screensaver, a ringtone of the single, the edited music video and MP3s of "The Dope Show" and "Disposable Teens".

Promo single

1. "Heart-Shaped Glasses (When the Heart Guides the Hand)" (Radio Edit) – 3:32
2. "Heart-Shaped Glasses (When the Heart Guides the Hand)" (Album Version) – 5:06

Hot Topic exclusive CD single

1. "Heart-Shaped Glasses (When the Heart Guides the Hand)" – 5:06
2. "You and Me and the Devil Makes 3" – 4:24

== Official remixes ==
1. "Heart-Shaped Glasses (When the Heart Guides the Hand)" (Hamel Remix)
2. "Heart-Shaped Glasses (When the Heart Guides the Hand)" (Inhuman Remix by Jade E Puget)
3. "Heart-Shaped Glasses (When the Heart Guides the Hand)" (Penetrate the Canvas Remix)
4. "Heart-Shaped Glasses (When the Heart Guides the Hand)" (Space Cowboy Remix)

== Charts ==
Chart (2007)	Peak position
Austria (Ö3 Austria Top 40)	41
Czech Rock Singles (ČNS IFPI)	20
Denmark (Tracklisten)	13
Germany (GfK)	49
Ireland (IRMA)	46
Italy (FIMI)	6
Scottish Singles Sales (Official Charts)	7
Sweden (Sverigetopplistan)	18
UK Singles (Official Charts)	19
UK Rock & Metal (Official Charts)	1
US Mainstream Rock (Billboard)	31
US Alternative Airplay (Billboard)	24
US Dance Club Songs (Billboard)	34
