= You and Me and the Devil Makes 3 =

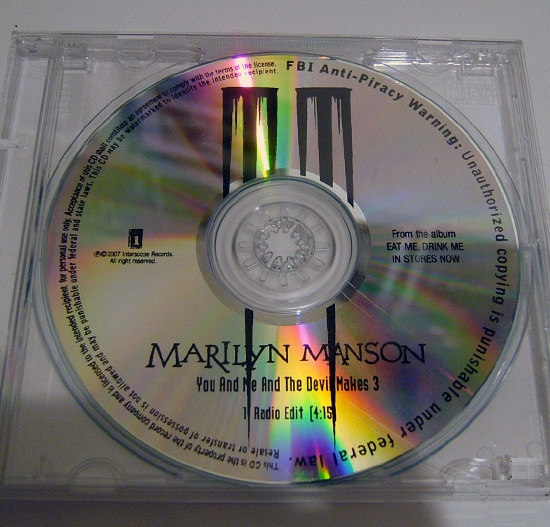

Promotional single by Marilyn Manson

from the album Eat Me, Drink Me
- Released: June 5, 2007; 18 years ago
- Length: 4:24
- Label: Interscope
- Songwriter(s): Marilyn Manson; Tim Sköld
- Producer(s): Marilyn Manson; Tim Sköld

"You and Me and the Devil Makes 3" is a song by American rock band Marilyn Manson. It is the tenth track on the 2007 album Eat Me, Drink Me, and was released as a promotional single from the album in September 2007. The album's most noticeable bass is heard in this song, which also has a chaotic melodic finish.

The lyrics "I'm just like rolling a stone up a hill in Hades" is a reference to Sisyphus, a figure who in Greek mythology was sentenced to roll a stone up a hill for eternity. The spoken phrase "Pants can always come off, pants can always come off" can be heard around 3:33 - half of the number 666.
