= Running to the Edge of the World =

Song by Marilyn Manson

from the album The High End of Low
- Released: May 20, 2009
- Genre: Soft rock
- Length: 6:25
- Label: Interscope
- Songwriters: Marilyn Manson; Twiggy Ramirez; Chris Vrenna
- Producers: Manson; Vrenna; Twiggy; Sean Beavan

"Running to the Edge of the World" is a song by American rock band Marilyn Manson. The track is from their seventh studio album The High End of Low (2009). The song is a soft rock power ballad with elements of blues, electronic music and 1980s heavy metal music that was written and produced by the band's eponymous frontman, Twiggy Ramirez and Chris Vrenna and co-produced by Sean Beavan. The track is about sex, death and destruction and features guitar and strings in its instrumentation and falsetto vocals from Manson. Music critics deemed the song a musical departure from the band's previous work and compared it to the music of other rock acts, particularly David Bowie.

"Running to the Edge of the World" received mixed reviews from critics; some commended the band's change of pace while others felt that the song showed that Manson's art was in decline. A music video for the track was co-directed by Manson and Nathan Cox, and depicts the vocalist performing the song from behind a curtain before beating a woman until she either loses consciousness or dies. Critics felt that the woman in the video resembled Manson's ex-girlfriend, Evan Rachel Wood, and condemned Manson for his perceived desire for attention and the clip for its portrayal of violence against women. The band would portray such violence in their subsequent work.

== Background ==
The band's eponymous frontman described the album The High End of Low (2009) as containing "extreme" autobiographical content relating to the dissolution of both his marriage to burlesque artist Dita Von Teese, and his later failed relationship with then-19-year old actress Evan Rachel Wood, explaining: "Some of the things I say here, it's sad to say them—they're relationship-destroying statements. Some of it is stuff I should have said to my ex-wife. Some are things I've never said to the world." Manson used his home as a canvas to document the disintegration of his relationship with Wood, writing the album's lyrics on walls and coupling them with paintings and drawings, as well as used condoms, bags of cocaine and other drug paraphernalia. Manson explained the state of mind that he was in when he created the album in an interview with Kerrang!:

This was when I went insane, for real. I think I had a psychotic breakdown making this. Those pictures of the crazy writing on my walls? That wasn't for a photo shoot, that was how I lived at the time. I think it's a great record – it was the last great collaboration between Twiggy [Ramirez] and I – but it came at a bad point in my life.

== Composition ==
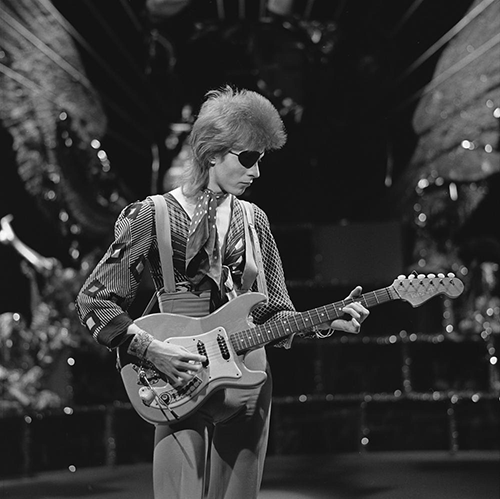
"Running to the Edge of the World" garnered comparisons to the music of David Bowie.

"Running to the Edge of the World" was written and produced by Marilyn Manson, Twiggy Ramirez and Chris Vrenna, with Sean Beavan serving as a co-producer. The song is an acoustic soft rock power ballad that features elements of electronic music and 1980s heavy metal. It has a length of six minutes and twenty-five seconds, and features a "hauntingly restrained" guitar in its instrumentation and strings during the chorus. Manson sings in falsetto during its middle 8. According to John Robb of The Quietus, the song is about death and destruction; Mary Elizabeth Williams of Salon interpreted it as being about sex and death, which she said made it thematically identical to "Eighty percent of the blues canon."

PopMatters's Lana Cooper felt that the song's refrain "We don't seek death/We seek destruction" could be understood as a "bromance-tinged love letter from" Manson to Ramirez. In the track, Manson sings "Sometimes hate is not enough/To turn this all to ashes/Together as one/Against all others/Break all of our wings to/Make sure it crashes," lyrics which The Washington Post's Nancy Dunham saw as referencing the singer's divorce from Dita Von Teese. Cooper added that the song sounds like "you'd expect [it] to be played during a slow dance at the Jonestown prom after someone spiked the Kool Aid punch bowl."

Alex Young of Consequence of Sound, Phil Freeman of AllMusic and Robb of The Quietus compared it to the music of David Bowie, with the latter specifically likening it to the singer's science fiction-themed 1970s work. John Lucas of The Georgia Straight found the song reminiscent of Pink Floyd's "Wish You Were Here" (1975) while IGN felt it had elements of "Every Rose Has Its Thorn" (1988) by Poison. Entertainment.ie's Lauren Murphy deemed the track a "lite" version of ballads by Oasis.

== Critical reception ==
Alternative Nation ranked it the sixth best Marilyn Manson song ever co-written with Twiggy Ramirez, and the best song on The High End of Low. John Robb of The Quietus described it as the album's curveball and a potential crossover hit. Robb added that "The bizarre change in style makes this one of the unlikely album highlights", a sentiment echoed by Mikael Wood of the Los Angeles Times, who described the song as a "surprise ... a lush acoustic power ballad complete with pretty falsetto vocals. At this point in Manson's career, sophistication is perhaps as big a shock as he can deliver." Alex Young of Consequence of Sound praised the David Bowie influence on the song. Adaora Otiji of Spin called the track an "emotional ballad" and Nancy Dunham of The Washington Post opined that the track, as well as The High End of Low as a whole, proved that "Manson may have suffered a punch that sidelined him, but he's back in the game." Langdon Hickman and Colette Claire of Consequence of Sound deemed the ballad "epic" while Mark LePage of the Vancouver Sun called it "epic (and processed)."

OC Weekly's Gabriel San Román deemed "Running to the Edge of the World" "a perfectly good song" that was ruined by its "loathsome" music video. Phil Freeman of AllMusic said that the song "could have been great if it had only been two minutes shorter", and that it instead contributed to making the middle of the album "boring". NME said that the track was "an embarrassing nadir. By opening up, [Manson's] totally emasculated himself. He sounds defeated, like a man who knows he's been drained of his shock value by Twilight-style mainstream co-option." Mayer Nissim of Digital Spy cited the track as one of the album's "many dreary and self-conscious straightforward rock songs" and panned Manson's vocal performance. Nissim felt that "Running to the Edge of the World" did not live up to the band's earlier slow songs, like "Coma White" from Mechanical Animals (1998) or "The Nobodies" from Holy Wood (In the Shadow of the Valley of Death) (2001). In Entertainment.ie, Lauren Murphy said the song was a "sign of a man either running out of tricks, or one desperate to reinvent himself." John Lucas of The Georgia Straight felt that its chorus "strains in vein to sound epic." Mary Elizabeth Williams of Salon said that the track "sucks" and was "not thought-provoking music."

== Music video ==
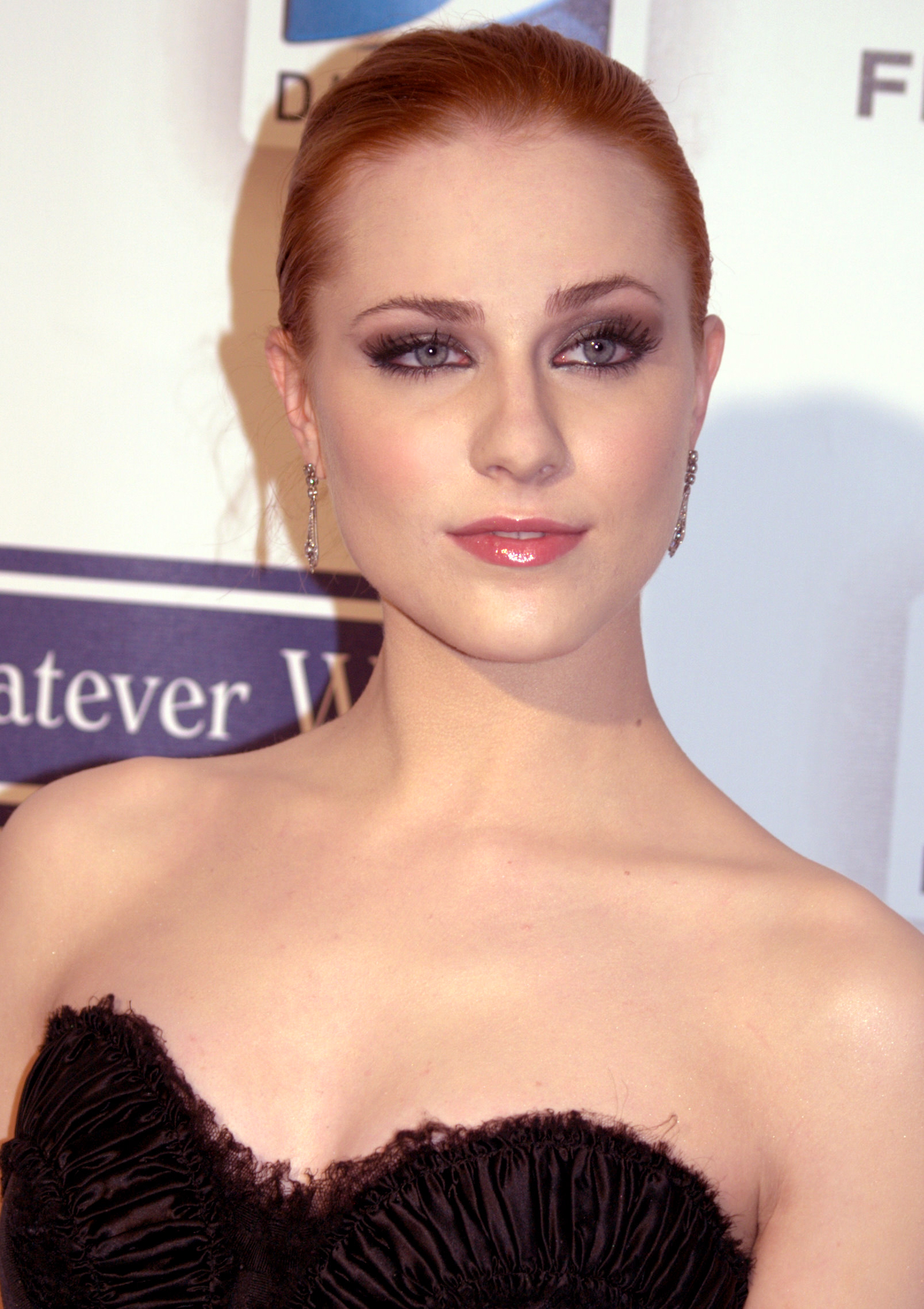
According to critics, the woman in the video resembles Manson's ex-girlfriend, Evan Rachel Wood (pictured in 2009).

The video for "Running to the Edge of the World" was released to Marilyn Manson's website. It was directed by the band's vocalist with Nathan Cox, who also directed the video for the band's 2004 cover of Depeche Mode's "Personal Jesus". It begins with Manson setting up a camera and a five-minute scene of the singer performing the song from behind a curtain, interspersed with glimpses of a blonde woman wearing only her underwear sitting in a hotel bathroom. This is followed by Manson punching the woman repeatedly until she gets bloody. Manson grabs the woman by her bra and rubs his hands on her bloodied, bare breasts. The woman then rubs her own blood across her exposed chest. She either loses consciousness or dies, her bloodied body left in a bathtub. According to critics, the woman resembles Manson's ex-girlfriend Evan Rachel Wood. Shortly before the video's premiere, Manson said that he had daily fantasies about "smashing [Wood's] skull in with a sledgehammer." Adoara Otiji of Spin found the video similar to the found footage horror film The Blair Witch Project (1999); San Roman of OC Weekly felt that the video mimicked snuff films and torture porn, an opinion echoed by Mary Elizabeth Williams of Salon.

It's surely no coincidence that the girl in the video looks a lot like Manson's ex, Evan Rachel Wood, and you don't have to be Carl Jung to figure out that the singer is sending his former girlfriend a message. The implicit statement to the rest of us is equally hard to miss: if things don't work out with a woman, a man has the right to take his frustrations out on her with his fists. The relationship's failure is all her fault, after all...so she has brought the brutality on herself.

— John Lucas, The Georgia Straight

The video for "Running to the Edge of the World" was widely panned, with critics finding it misogynistic and decrying its portrayal of violence against women. Gil Kaufman of MTV News contrasted the clip for "Running to the Edge of the World" with that of Eminem's "Love the Way You Lie" (2010) noting that critics generally praised the latter for its "serious" handling of domestic violence. Brandon Stosuy of Stereogum deemed the video "a new low" for Manson. He noted that it was released the same day that Rihanna was interviewed on 20/20 about being assaulted by Chris Brown, and was unsure if this was intentional or not. A writer for Videogum felt that the clip might have been somewhat shocking if it predated the video for the Prodigy's "Smack My Bitch Up" (1997), but instead came across as "the obnoxious work of an aging asshole who's run out of ideas."

Jonathan Barkan of Bloody Disgusting said the video "almost feels lazy, as though a ballad like this could only be done by showing Manson desperately cling to a lacy curtain, looking like he's about to write poetry while listening to the Cure." Barkan commented "While I can appreciate the more intimate style of video they were going for here, it just feels wildly out of place to see Manson so forlorn and dejected," adding that the scenes of Manson lip-syncing were too long. San Román of OC Weekly noted that Manson would later incorporate violence against women into both his surrealist film Born Villain (2011) and the music video for "No Reflection" (2012). San Román contrasted these artistic decisions with Manson's earlier condemnation of the perceived misogyny in Eminem's debut album.

Williams of Salon said that the video proves that Manson is "hungry...for controversy" and opined that "paying his loathsome shtick any notice might be construed as giving him exactly what he wants." Stereogum said that the video could be interpreted as "Desperate P.R." In The Georgia Straight, John Lucas wrote that while the video "unmasks [Manson] as the colossal douchebag and shameless attention whore that he really is," it "stirred up surprisingly little controversy, which is more a testament to the state of the singer's career than anything else." Lucas contrasted the lack of a reaction to the clip for "Running to the Edge of the World" to the popularity of Rammstein's sexually explicit music video for "Pussy" (2009), which propelled the band's album Liebe ist für alle da (2009) to commercial success. Lucas said that, by releasing "Running to the Edge of the World," Manson tried and failed to be the "challenging, button-pushing artist" that Madonna was when she released her video for "Justify My Love" back in 1990. Williams of Salon said that the video is "not outrageous and envelope-pushing. It's a cynical exploitation of abuse served up as entertainment. And it's just gross."

== Personnel ==
Credits adapted from the liner notes of The High End of Low.

- Marilyn Manson – vocals, lyrics and production
- Twiggy Ramirez – composer, electric, acoustic and bass guitars, production
- Chris Vrenna – composer, keyboards, synth string, percussion, drum programming, programming, Pro Tools, engineering, production, mixing
- Sean Beavan – engineering, co-production, mixing
- Mike Riley – recording assistant, engineer
- Jeremy Underwood – recording assistant, engineer
- Ted Jensen - mastering

== Charts ==
Chart (2009)	Peak position
Czech Rock Airplay (ČNS IFPI)	7

== See also ==
- Marilyn Manson discography
