= We're from America =

Single by Marilyn Manson

from the album The High End of Low
- Released: 27 March 2009; 14 April 2009 (CD single)
- Recorded: Hollywood, California, 2008–09
- Genre: Industrial rock; hard rock; dance-punk
- Length: 5:04
- Label: Interscope
- Songwriters: Marilyn Manson; Twiggy Ramirez; Chris Vrenna
- Producers: Marilyn Manson; Chris Vrenna; Twiggy Ramirez; Sean Beavan

Marilyn Manson singles chronology
| "Putting Holes in Happiness" (2007) | "We're from America" (2009) | "Arma-goddamn-motherfuckin-geddon" (2009) |

Audio sample
- "We're from America": file; help

"We're from America" is a song by American rock band Marilyn Manson. The song was released as the first single from The High End of Low. Its title was revealed on March 18, 2009, in the month's issue of Kerrang!. The article erroneously states that the song was released during the second week of March 2009; however, this did not actually happen until March 27, when it was released for free as an MP3 on MarilynManson.com, accompanied by a new layout for the website. The song was reissued as a digital single on April 7, 2009, and is currently available on iTunes and Amazon.com.

== Background ==
In the March 18, 2009 issue of Kerrang!, Marilyn Manson described the song as a scathing criticism of American exceptionalism:

I think a lot of people will hear the track and initially think it's just political, but it's not just that, it's also me describing a lot of fucked-up scenarios that I'm going through in my personal life. Someone asked me, "Why are you so fucked up?", "Well, I am from America." I hate the fact that so many people have fucked the country up, and so many people fucked up my personal life and I allowed it to happen. So in a way, I feel like America as a whole feels, but in no way does that make me a tree-hugging patriotic freedom rocker.

In response to this interview, Rudy Coby, who earlier gave a brief explanation of "Devour", said about the song on his MySpace profile:

I love the song but it doesn't sound like any other song on the album--it was the one I said he played eleventh or twelfth almost as an afterthought. ... It's one part of a journey--but it isn't giving away the game. I totally understand why Kerrang would want this as their special preview download though--everyone is reevaluating our country right now and this song is "America the (Un)Beautiful" and doesn't take any fucking shit.

== Track listing ==
=== Hot Topic Exclusive CD single ===
All lyrics are written by Marilyn Manson; all music is composed by Twiggy Ramirez, Chris Vrenna.

| No. | Title | Length |
|---|---|---|
| 1. | "We're from America" | 5:04 |
| 2. | "Four Rusted Horses (Opening Titles Version)" | 5:02 |

== Charts ==
| Chart (2009) | Peak position |
|---|---|
| US Hot 100 Singles Sales (Billboard) | 3 |
