= Eat Me, Drink Me =

Studio album by Marilyn Manson
- Released: June 5, 2007
- Recorded: October 2006 – February 2007
- Genres: Gothic rock; alternative rock
- Length: 52:12
- Label: Interscope
- Producers: Marilyn Manson; Tim Sköld

Marilyn Manson chronology
Lest We Forget: The Best Of (2004)	Eat Me, Drink Me (2007)	The High End of Low (2009)

Singles from Eat Me, Drink Me
- 1. "Heart-Shaped Glasses (When the Heart Guides the Hand)" Released: April 17, 2007; 2. "Putting Holes in Happiness" Released: October 19, 2007

Eat Me, Drink Me (Stylized in all caps.) is the sixth studio album by American rock band Marilyn Manson. It was released on June 5, 2007, by Interscope Records. It was recorded in a rented home studio in Hollywood by lead vocalist Marilyn Manson and guitarist and bassist Tim Sköld, and was produced by Manson and Sköld.

It was the band's first album not to be recorded as a five-piece, as John 5 departed from the group in 2004. Instead of replacing 5, Tim Sköld remained with bass and played the guitar, and the band continued as a four-piece. Manson has stated that he sang most of the album lying down on the studio floor with his hands cupping the studio microphone, resulting in a very distinctive vocal sound. Of Sköld's compositions, a further two are said to have been turned into fully-fledged songs with lyrics, music and vocals completed but were not put onto album for fear of making it overwrought.

Upon its release, Eat Me, Drink Me was met with positive reviews from critics, and debuted at number eight on the US Billboard 200. The album was the last to feature band member Tim Sköld, and spawned two singles ("Heart-Shaped Glasses (When the Heart Guides the Hand)" and "Putting Holes in Happiness"). The band supported the album with the Rape of the World Tour.

== Development and recording ==
After spending time around the end of the Grotesk Burlesk Tour in severe depression and contemplating his permanent departure from the music industry, Manson had a change of heart and recorded a duet of "Don't You Want Me" with Shirley Manson. This was originally intended to support the forthcoming best-of release, but was felt by both artists not to live up to their standards and has yet to see release.

Lest We Forget: The Best Of was released on September 28, 2004, and was referred to by the singer as his "farewell" album; however, he insisted that it would not be the final Marilyn Manson album. After the release of the single "Personal Jesus", the band made a number of promotional appearances. Lest We Forget was certified Gold in 2005. When promotion for Lest We Forget concluded, the band returned to the studio and recorded eight embryonic songs—some of which had vocals, and one notably a tribute to Andy Warhol. It was supported by the Against All Gods Tour. The tour was marked by one release, a 2005 EP of "The Nobodies" featuring a new mix of the song (by Chris Vrenna) and other remixes.

Manson began his recording sessions on the album in November 2005 but was focused on his film Phantasmagoria: The Visions of Lewis Carroll, the process of opening an art gallery and personal troubles relating to his marriage. It was after the opening of the Celebritarian Corporation Gallery of Fine Art, on Halloween night of 2006 that Manson really began his contribution as a singer by working out melodies and structures around Sköld's already existing compositions, writing lyrics quickly and usually recording on the same day. One result of this is that the album features six guitar solos from Sköld (comprising 3 minutes, 39 seconds of the album in total) and many other guitar moments while bass and keyboards—both played also by Sköld—feature much less than on a usual Marilyn Manson release. Manson explained that "[he] was writing in the way you would write a diary" and as a result thinks that the record was written from a "more mature musical point of view."

This is the record I've worked all my life to get to. You always have to transform, or you can't continue as an artist, and this record has been the biggest transformation for me [...] It's better heard than described [...] On this record I really wanted to sing, and that has to come from a naked, emotional place. It's not a record about me crying, or songs about my woes, but I think this record will probably speak to more people in different ways, because of its total human element [...] If I had to do a record review, I'd say it's got a cannibal, consumption, obsessive, violent-sex, romance angle, but with an upbeat swing to it [...] The album's title [Eat Me, Drink Me] was also inspired by that story several years back of the German man who put out an ad that he wanted to be eaten, and the man who ate him. Although I can't relate to the relationship those two had, I found the story very compelling in a romantic way.

— Marilyn Manson, Revolver

It has been stated that there were originally around 20 embryonic songs, all written by Sköld, two of which (that did not make the album) Manson considered complete with lyrics and vocals. Manson stated that he had a difficult time cutting some of them, but felt he had to in order to prevent the album from being "diluted". On May 31, the entire album was uploaded for streaming on Marilyn Manson's Myspace page, five days prior to its American release.

== Themes ==
"This record is definitely so crucial to my life. I think this record shows a human side of me, shows a vulnerable side of me, which is linked to Lewis Carroll. [...] it is like the Christ's mythology with the vampires' mythology."

— Marilyn Manson on the album's concept.

"Manson probably needed something to shake up his music, which started to become comfortably predictable in the wake of his popular/creative peak of Mechanical Animals, but the stab at soul-baring on Eat Me might not have been the way to do it. But Manson is such a true believer in rock & roll mythos that he's wound up embracing the cliché of the post-divorce confessional album, peppering this album with songs about "broken relationships and new love". Personal songs are unusual for Manson, but that doesn't mean he's abandoned his tendency to write about grand concepts. The difference is that this time around, Manson himself is the grand concept which may give him a lyrical hook, but not a musical one. On a sonic level, this is a bit of "Manson-by-numbers", but it feels as if his usual murky menace has lifted, with the music sounding clearer, less affected, and obtuse, while still retaining much of its gothic romanticism and churning heaviness. If anything, Eat Me is a bit too transparent, as its clean arena rock production makes the album sound safe, a bit too close to Manson cabaret for comfort, especially when he's penning songs whose very titles feel like unwitting self-parodies such as "If I Was Your Vampire", "You and Me and the Devil Makes 3" and "They Said That Hell's Not Hot", or when he lazily spews out profanity as the chorus to "Mutilation Is the Most Sincere Form of Flattery."

The most prevalent literary influence of the album and Manson's state of being is that of Lolita by Vladimir Nabokov, one of the most notorious books of the twentieth century. The song "Heart-Shaped Glasses" is the most obvious nod to Lolita as, according to Manson, Evan Rachel Wood is also a huge fan of Nabokov and had deliberately worn heart-shaped sunglasses upon meeting for a tryst when their relationship became romantic.

Connections to the novel are much deeper than simply the inside joke between Manson and Wood of the obvious age difference; the heart-shaped sunglasses as associated with Lolita appear only in the promotional poster and cover of Stanley Kubrick's film adaptation of the novel, not actually in the film itself or in Nabokov's novel.

According to Manson, vampirism is just one of the dark themes running through Eat Me, Drink Me. "If I had to do a record review, I'd say it's got a cannibal, consumption, obsessive, violent-sex, romance angle, but with an upbeat swing to it." Aside from the obvious Lewis Carroll and Jesus Christ references, Manson says the album's title was also inspired by the story of Armin Meiwes, who placed an ad online for a person consenting to be eaten.

The Vampire, whom Manson personified during "Eat Me, Drink Me", in one regard is an inversion of the mythology of Christ. Both entities rise from the dead but as Christ offers his body and blood for his disciples to feast upon in communion with him, the vampire, as contrary to this, devours the flesh and blood of his victims in order to make them one with him.

=== Logos ===
Logo for the Eat Me, Drink Me era

In 2007, Eat Me, Drink Me brought with it, for the first time in nearly over ten years, a symbol Manson adopted to represent himself with that did not have an immediate and apparent deeper connotation to the occult, mock-fascism or an artistic movement. This logo, later dubbed the "heart-shaped spiral" in official online store item descriptions, was a red, roughly drawn heart which spiraled at its center. Manson revealed that it was an homage to Wood for inspiring him with love and creative drive which was the impetus needed to create the album. He elaborated that as it was tattooed on his left inner wrist.

The Eat Me, Drink Me era's visuals were inspired by the iconography of the 1935 Karl Freund film Mad Love. As can be seen within both the album artwork and repeated on the CD single for "Putting Holes in Happiness", we see a closeup of Manson's eye with a heart as the pupil signifying a romantic and newly inspired Manson with literal "hearts in his eyes". In very close relation to the film and artwork of Mad Love, which portrayed an insane and malformed monster of a man who is driven to create his mad abominations by the love of a woman, Manson's eyes can be seen to signify this theme likewise in reflecting how Evan inspired his resurgence of creativity needed to compose the album.

The primary Eat Me, Drink Me Marilyn Manson logo were two blood dripping fang-like M's to represent the initials of the band.

== Composition ==
"[The songs] are clearly written to seduce somebody [...] I don't want people to think that the record is some kind of exploitation of my personal life. At the same time, it also represents exactly who I am and what I feel [...] I really wanted to be a singer on this album. This is very earnest and uncalculated and raw, in the sense that I know I'm fucked up, and I'm really not ashamed of it."

— Marilyn Manson, Rolling Stone

Manson makes references to various imagery through lyrical allusions in Eat Me, Drink Me, which are not visual in its case, but in verse form. Eat Me, Drink Me was Manson's most personal album to date; the lyrics are full of self explorations of past themes which Manson has explored as well as many allusions to the album's inspirations.

"Heart-Shaped Glasses"
"Heart-Shaped Glasses" satirizes Manson's love with Evan Rachel Wood, who inspired Manson for this song.

"Putting Holes In Happiness"
The second single of the album was written on Manson's own birthday. He describes the song as being "a romantic-misogynistic-cannibal-gothic-vampire ballad".

"If I Was Your Vampire"
Album version of the song "If I Was Your Vampire". The song was included on the Vampires Suck soundtrack.

The album opens with "If I Was Your Vampire", an industrial-goth song. Quiet ringing guitars are offset by heavy drums, owing as much musically to The Sisters of Mercy as it does to Nine Inch Nails. And the lyrics are as much Bauhaus as Ministry with talk of "blood-stained sheets in the shape of your heart". Majestic would be another way to describe it, as drenched in irony-deprived passion, Manson intones "Beyond the pale/ Everything is black/ No turning back."

The lyrical auto-erotica that begins in the lead-off track ("Drive me off the mountain/ You'll burn, I'll eat your ashes/ Impossible wheels seducing our corpse") continues with the wailing "Just a Car Crash Away" and the stand-out "Are You the Rabbit?", which harkens back to the "glammy guitar feel" of Mechanical Animals. "Are You the Rabbit?" builds off of Manson's obsession with Lewis Carroll, while pulling fairy-tale like lyrics off in style with an all-around catchy song and hook.

In what is seen as a way to attract with the young generation, Manson's public attachment to Evan Rachel Wood is flaunted throughout this release, from his personal artwork, to the song and video for the Lolita-inspired first single, "Heart-Shaped Glasses (When the Heart Guides the Hand)". The song itself is a piece of militant drum cadence mixed with heavy sexuality in both Manson's lyrics and delivery: "She'll never cover up what we did with her dress."

The blustery guitar of "You and Me and the Devil Makes 3" revels in the repetition of the title alongside the menacing delivery of "There's not a word for what I want to do to you", but it's hard to take any song too seriously when it contains a "Murdercute happyrape" lyrical chorus. Although somewhat lyrically stunted, "The Red Carpet Grave" is an interesting song on the album, "The Red Carpet Grave" is perhaps the most confessional track, with Manson repeating the line, "I can't turn my back on you, but you're walking away."

The new wave elements are present to a lesser extent on harder-rocking songs like "Mutilation Is the Most Sincere Form of Flattery". The latter song is one of several that touch on Manson's marriage and subsequent divorce from Dita von Teese, as Manson writes about his personal life in his music for the first time.

Rumors also circulated for some time that Marilyn Manson wrote the song "Mutilation Is the Most Sincere Form of Flattery" as an attack on the band My Chemical Romance, for his Eat Me, Drink Me release (which he later denied, saying that it was aimed at people in general seeking to imitate him). In another interview Manson stated, "I'm embarrassed to be me because these people are doing a really sad, pitiful, shallow version of what I've done".

== Promotion ==
Marilyn Manson performing during the Eat Me, Drink Me era in 2007

On April 15, 2007, Marilyn Manson's Interscope Records-administered Myspace page went live with promotional artwork. The next day "If I Was Your Vampire" was added to the player as Myspace Music's "Single of the Week". Hours later, Manson's official website went through a revision to coincide with the imagery of the new album. Later still but on the same day, Interscope e-mailed out a press release containing the album artwork by Nela Koenig. Two days later Interscope opened a "VampireFreaks" account for Manson. The album leaked onto P2P networks on May 1, Manson said he was unconcerned by the leak as it mainly affects record companies and not the artists.

To promote the album, Manson first traveled to France, the United Kingdom, and Germany, where he held both press conferences and listening parties. Similar listening parties for journalists and fan club administrators took place in other European countries and the United States. Measures taken to prevent an unauthorized recording or copy of the album from leaking included bag searching and the prohibition of recording devices and mobile phones. Manson appeared twice on BBC Radio 1; on April 17 on the Zane Lowe Show and on May 23 in the Live Lounge where he and Sköld performed an acoustic version of "Heart-Shaped Glasses" and a cover of Justin Timberlake's "What Goes Around Comes Around", having been given a choice by the station of Timberlake, Green Day, Amy Winehouse or Muse.

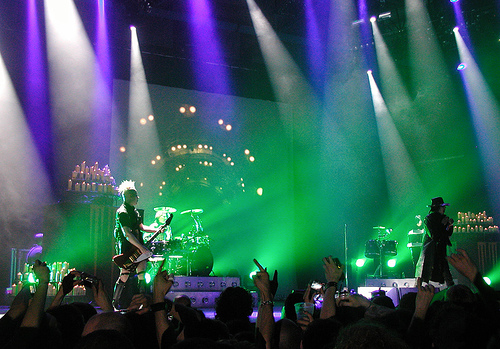
Marilyn Manson performing "If I Was Your Vampire" during the Eat Me, Drink Me era in 2007

The next significant promotion took place on May 18 with the uploading to the official website of the album's 16-page linear booklet. The uploading coincided with Manson's in store signing at Hot Topic in California where fans who had obtained an entry wristband days prior were given a copy of the booklet for Manson to sign though he signed other items on fans request for two hours. Also available at the event, and now available in Hot Topic stores and online shop, is an exclusive two-track "Heart-Shaped Glasses" single. All Hot Topic stores across the USA held listening parties for the album on May 25. The stores are also added three new official T-shirts to the racks to coincide with the party and Manson recorded linking material for the songs.

Newbury Comics gave away licensed Eat Me, Drink Me pint glasses with each pre-order of the album. Further promotional oddities were to be found in the UK, where boxes were distributed containing chocolates marked "Eat Me" and mini bottles of Tequila with "Drink Me" on the back.

An official Eat Me, Drink Me mini-site was discovered through a link found in the European "Heart-Shaped Glasses (When the Heart Guides the Hand)" single. The site, www.marilynmansonvault.com, contains lyrics, a photo gallery, a mosaic, and the ability to stream up to two tracks per day starting on May 28, 2007. Upon completion of the mosaic, an Eat Me, Drink Me wallpaper becomes available for download, and three preview tracks ("Heart-Shaped Glasses (When the Heart Guides the Hand)", "If I Was Your Vampire", and "Evidence") become available for streaming. The official release of the single coincided with the opening of the vault itself (for those with the single) to access a screensaver, ringtone and two "classic tracks for download" ("Disposable Teens" and "The Dope Show").

The song "If I Was Your Vampire" was used in the soundtrack to the 2010 parody flick Vampires Suck. In the film it opens the end credits.

=== Watercolors ===
Marilyn Manson's 2007 to 2008 worldwide art exhibition named for its title-piece, watercolor, surfaced in mid-2006, at the period when Manson had been thoroughly immersed in the composition of his film project Phantasmagoria: The Visions of Lewis Carroll. As such, many of the paintings released simultaneously bore similar themes and re-interpretations of the nightmare world of Carroll's Alice in Wonderland.

The title of the painting evokes the much deeper reference of Charles Baudelaire's 1857 incendiary poetic collection during the era of Romanticism, Les Fleurs Du Mal (English: The Flowers of Evil).

== Release ==
"[I was] blown away as Manson debuted his new album, Eat Me, Drink Me. The key cut is "If I Was Your Vampire," a six-minute epic… If anyone thought Manson was down for the count, think again."

— Rolling Stone writer Austin Scaggs

Manson announced via his website in mid-January that the record was "nearly finished", titled Eat Me, Drink Me, and that the band would be touring the world in support of the record that was scheduled for release on June 5, 2007. The album's artwork was wrapped up in early February 2007 thus bringing an end to the creative process in preparation for the imminent promotion and publication of details. Since the release of the album, Manson appeared in Rolling Stone four times: the March article "Manson's Dark Return", a further paragraph from the Smoking Section, a mention in the "50 Albums to Look Forward to This Summer" issue and a small snippet featuring an explicit picture of Manson and Evan Rachel Wood in a hotel after the "Heart-Shaped Glasses" video shoot in which a naked Wood lies over Manson who has his fingers in the vicinity of her anus. Other publications to include original content with Manson have been: the April issue of UK magazine Rock Sound, the May issue of Revolver, an interview with French RockMag, an MTV online piece focusing on Manson's suicidal ideation, an interview in Rock Sound, a descriptive piece in The Observer Magazine (The Life and Loves of a He-Devil), a partial transcript of a chat with Alejandro Jodorowsky, an interview in Germany's lifestyle monthly BlondMag, the cover story of June's Spin magazine entitled "The Last Rock Star?", an article in Rolling Stone from Austin Scaggs, and The Sun newspaper's Something For The Weekend section.

=== Cover and packaging ===
The cover art for Eat Me, Drink Me portrayed Manson as a vampire, dressed with a black-toned outfit, standing still looking at the camera next to a window covered with blood; the pose bore a very strong resemblance to the artwork for Tubeway Army's 1979 album Replicas. The back of the cover features a photo of a woman with her eyes covered by a hand, possibly Manson's hand, with the track listing featured on the left side. In one of the booklet's page, Manson says: "I would like to thank the loyal few that waited, at the far end of the abyss, for me to make this record. My mother and father, my best friends (you know who you are). Tony, Bobby and everyone else who has forgiven me for my wrongdoings. This record is dedicated to those who stood by me. Most of all, this is for Evan." A tour shirt was released to the online market featuring the cover of the album.

The front cover was shot by Nela Koenig and the back cover by Anthony Silva. The inside photos were shot by Perou and Nela Koenig and all Polaroids by Manson and Wood. The Heart-Shaped Eyes were self-portrait by Manson and the art direction and design by Marilyn Manson and Liam Ward.

=== Formats ===
The album was released in three physical formats. The standard jewel case CD release contained a single enhanced CD and a 16-page booklet. The limited edition CD featured bonus tracks with acoustic version of "Putting Holes in Happiness" and three other remixes of the single "Heart-Shaped Glasses". An edition including a bonus DVD was also released. It featured a bonus CD including seven remixes of "Putting Holes in Happiness", "Heart-Shaped Glasses" and "You And Me and the Devil Makes 3"; and a DVD, including the music videos of "Putting Holes in Happiness" and "Heart-Shaped Glasses" and a "Track by track interview" video.

An instrumental version of the entire album entitled Bonus Track and Instrumentals from the Album Eat Me, Drink Me was leaked in late 2007 on YouTube. It features all tracks from the album without the vocal track and also includes a remix of "Heart-Shaped Glasses (When the Heart Guides the Hand)", which was released as a bonus track on most international versions of the album. It is not a sanctioned release by Interscope. Nevertheless, a FLAC version of the album was uploaded to torrents thereafter, which made availability more widespread due to the price and rarity of pressed, physical copies.

== Singles ==
On April 17, 2007, "Heart-Shaped Glasses (When the Heart Guides the Hand)" was released as the lead single of the album and was added to the Marilyn Manson's official Myspace page on April 24. On April 27, 2007, Marilyn Manson released a clip featuring the last 34 seconds of the then upcoming music video for "Heart-Shaped Glasses (When the Heart Guides the Hand)" on YouTube, and later on the official website. The song peaked at #24 on U.S. Modern Rock Tracks.

"Putting Holes in Happiness" is Marilyn Manson's second single from the album. Written on his own birthday, Marilyn Manson describes the song as being "a romantic-misogynistic-cannibal-gothic-vampire ballad". A two-track promotional disc was released in June 2007, but no confirmation of the song as the album's second single followed until Marilyn Manson confirmed the next single to be "Putting Holes in Happiness" on August 7, 2007. The song has already appeared on the radio in France, where a promo of the single has been sent out to several major radio stations. The Guitar Hero Remix by Nick Zinner version of the single was featured on early special editions of Guitar Hero III: Legends of Rock.

"You and Me and the Devil Makes 3" was released as a promotional single from the album in September 2007.

== Critical reception ==
Professional ratings
Aggregate scores
Source	Rating
Metacritic	63/100
Review scores
Source	Rating
AllMusic	3/5 stars
Entertainment Weekly	B
The Guardian	3/5 stars
Los Angeles Times	4/4 stars
The New York Times	2.5/4 stars
NME	7/10
PopMatters	7/10
Rolling Stone	3/5 stars
Slant	3.5/5 stars
Stylus	D+

Upon its release, the album met with positive reviews. Metacritic, which assigns a normalized rating out of 100 to reviews from mainstream critics, the album received an average score 63, based on 23 reviews, which indicates "generally favorable reviews". AllMusic gave the album a mixed review and said that "[it] is a bit too transparent, as its clean arena rock production makes the album sound safe [...] Eat Me, Drink Me becomes an intriguing muddle, an interesting portrait of Manson at the cusp of middle-age melancholy even if as sheer music it's the least visceral or compelling he's ever been." The Los Angeles Times praised the album's concept, saying "The songs too are sculpted from the darkest stone with special care. Previous Manson guitarists will envy the solo space allotted Sköld; a number of exceptional ax workouts perfectly reflect moods that range from mounting pride to roiling anguish to moaning abjection." It also noted that "Putting Holes In Happiness" stands out as "one of Manson's greatest songs." Jamie Fullerton of NME gave the album a rating of 7 out of 10, and said that "[t]his album sees him rising from the hordes of spider-black hoodies, becoming a musical force beyond the Download ticket-holders. Eat him, drink him, but make sure you listen to him too."

PopMatters also gave the album a rating of 7 out of 10, and commented that "Eat Me, Drink Me should return Manson to his former successes, and rightfully so. There is an earnestness in the music designed to speak directly to fucked-up adolescence while often inexplicably foregoing the pander. There is something to be said for knowing where the line is and when to cross it. Call Manson what you will—genius, has-been, shock rocker, freak—but like his best work, Eat Me, Drink Me is as fun as it is cartoonishly scary." Slant Magazine gave the album a favorable review and praised "'Putting Holes in Happiness' [as] the best of the autobiographical tracks, with a melancholic guitar riff that matches the song's appropriately plodding arrangement. Hardcore fans may take offense to the lack of any songs challenging God, government, or society in general, but it's their loss. Eat Me, Drink Me is a bona fide creative rebirth." Rolling Stone magazine gave the album a three out of five stars and said that Manson "hasn't exactly overhauled his identity, but with Eat Me, Drink Me, he's at least tweaked his approach a bit. [...] It's still plenty dark, with Manson dishing about vampires and mutilation in a horror-ific croak that's rougher than ever. [...] Some of Eat Me, Drink Me is ho-hum and bone-dry, with few hot choruses and even fewer chord changes. But unlike those breast implants he once had, it's nothing to be embarrassed about."

=== Commercial performance ===
On May 31, the entire album was uploaded for streaming on Marilyn Manson's Myspace page, five days prior to its American release. When released, it debuted at number eight on the US Billboard 200 with 88,000 copies sold in its first week. Elsewhere, Eat Me, Drink Me reached the top five in Austria, France, Germany, and Switzerland, and the top 10 in Australia, Canada, Finland, Spain, Sweden, and the United Kingdom. The album debuted at number 15 on the Oricon Albums Chart in Japan, selling over 17,000 copies in its first week.

=== Accolades ===
About.com nominated the album the 10th best rock album of 2007 and said: "One of Marilyn Manson's least calculatedly 'shocking' records, Eat Me, Drink Me may also be one of his best, favoring sturdy new wave hooks instead of cheap horror-movie theatrics. The welcome return to inspired songwriting also reinvigorates his dark introspection, such as on 'If I Was Your Vampire', a bloodcurdling tale that merges vampire lore with a story of a dangerously obsessive relationship. Eat Me, Drink Me is a reminder of what Manson does best: turning scary industrial rock noises into universal messages of fear and self-doubt."

== Rape of the World Tour ==
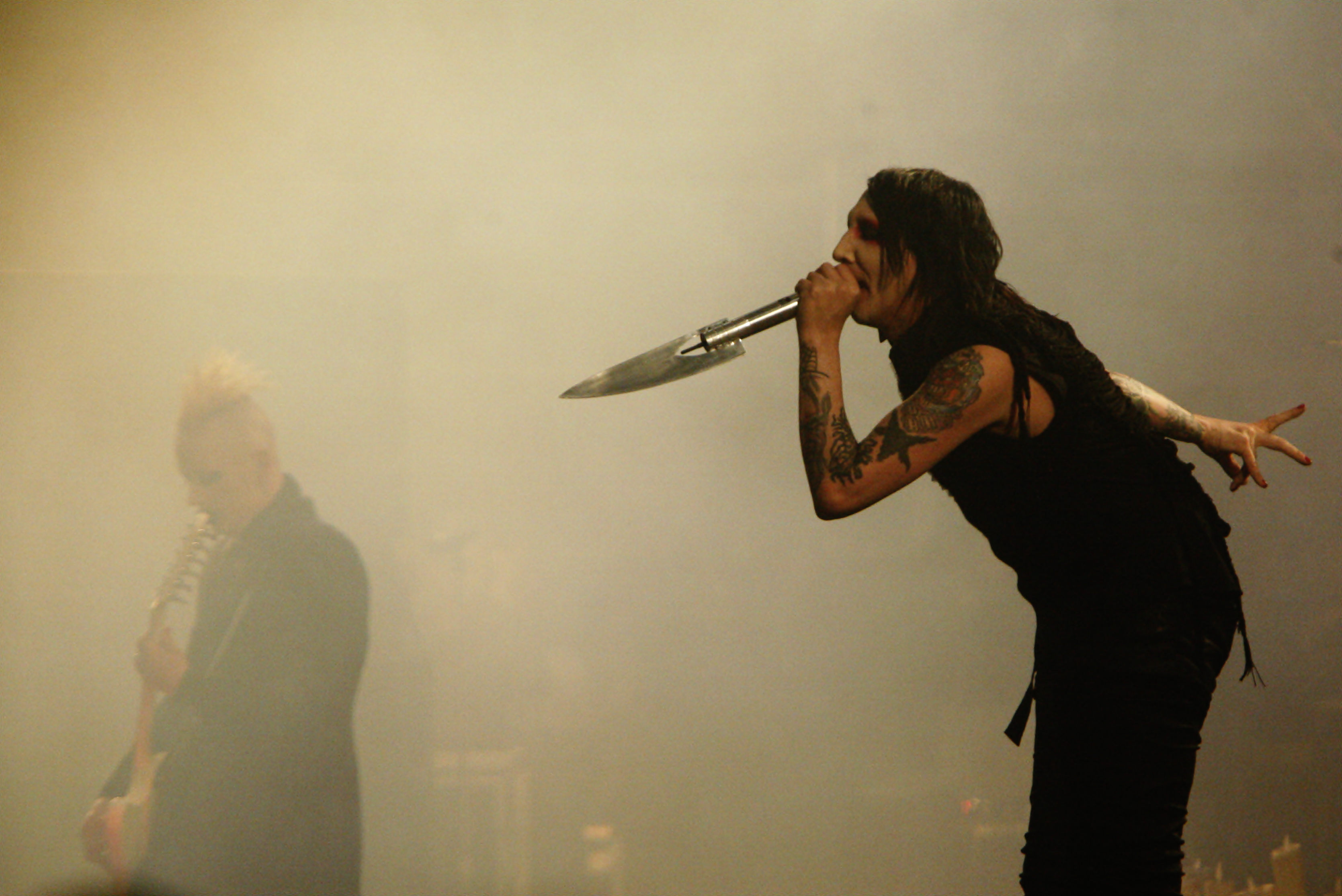
Marilyn Manson performing "The Nobodies" during the Rape of the World Tour, June 2007

The Rape of the World Tour is the eleventh tour Marilyn Manson embarked on, under management of major record label Interscope Records. It was also the band's seventh tour to span over multiple legs. The band was on the tour from May 26, 2007, until March 2, 2008. During the North American dates the band toured with thrash metal band Slayer and metalcore band Bleeding Through. During the Australian dates, Manson was supported by Australian pop-punk band The Spazzys, who received harsh criticism from the crowds. During the Winter European tour leg the band was supported by Turbonegro. The support act for the Winter North American tour leg was OURS.

For this tour Manson returned to the theatrics of the Grotesk Burlesk Tour, some influenced by Alice in Wonderland. Initially, Manson took to the stage wearing a leather jacket with cut off gloves and a black, long-sleeved shirt to perform the opener, "If I Was Your Vampire" and the follow-up, "Disposable Teens". When first performed as an encore on the European tour, Manson took to the stage for either "Are You the Rabbit?" or "The Nobodies" (and in the case of Paris, the album's title song), wearing a striped white-gold, long-sleeved shirt. Manson later replaced the long-sleeve shirt for a black T-shirt with cut off sleeves. When the butcher knife microphone debuted, Manson performed the first song like this but also wore black, elbow-length gloves. On certain dates, Manson wore silver pants with his black shirt. "If I Was Your Vampire" then began to be performed in a black frilly shirt and a black feather boa and pink gloves for "Are You the Rabbit?".

Following his appearance with Alice Cooper, Manson began to take to the stage in a T-shirt depicting a cartoon of a bunny rabbit, or on later occasions, a cut-off T-shirt with a skeleton chest on. Costume changes on these dates after the distinctly nontheatrical European tour first leg featured a top hat and striped pants (occasionally a leather trench coat and jacket) for "Mobscene", a jacket with '333 HALF EVIL' patched onto it, and even at some dates, a boxing gown for "The Fight Song" with the iconic twisted heart on the front and the bleeding MM logo on the back, as well as a white jacket, reminiscent of Elvis Presley, for "Rock Is Dead" at later dates. Contrasting these changes, Manson still performed "Antichrist Superstar" in the black business suit/red shirt ensemble, sometimes changing into a silver version of the rabbit shirt for later performances of "The Beautiful People" on dates on the European tour.

=== Posters ===
Limited edition tour posters sold during the January to March 2008 Winter tour became important for the album's promotion. Each poster, printed and designed by Print Mafia, was limited to 100 runs each with a unique design available for, and exclusively in, each city of the tour. The dark themed poster designs featured serial killers (namely many of which the band members adopted the latter half of their stage names from), models and actresses (a handful of which the band members adopted the first of their stage names from), martyrs, iconic figures which represent the themes of Eat Me, Drink Me and various horror films.

== Track listing ==
All tracks written and produced by Marilyn Manson and Tim Sköld.

No.	Title	Length
1.	"If I Was Your Vampire"	5:56
2.	"Putting Holes in Happiness"	4:31
3.	"The Red Carpet Grave"	4:05
4.	"They Said That Hell's Not Hot"	4:17
5.	"Just a Car Crash Away"	4:55
6.	"Heart-Shaped Glasses (When the Heart Guides the Hand)"	5:05
7.	"Evidence"	5:19
8.	"Are You the Rabbit?"	4:14
9.	"Mutilation Is the Most Sincere Form of Flattery"	3:52
10.	"You and Me and the Devil Makes 3"	4:24
11.	"Eat Me, Drink Me" ( (Note: "Eat Me, Drink Me" is stylized in all caps.))	5:40
Total length:		52:12

Best Buy bonus download
No.	Title	Length
12.	"Heart-Shaped Glasses" (Penetrate the Canvas Remix)	4:48
Total length:		57:00

International bonus track
No.	Title	Length
12.	"Heart-Shaped Glasses" (Inhuman Remix)	4:07
Total length:		56:19

International digital bonus track
No.	Title	Length
13.	"Heart-Shaped Glasses" (Hamel Remix)	7:00
Total length:		63:21

UK, Japanese and Australian bonus track
No.	Title	Length
13.	"Heart-Shaped Glasses" (Space Cowboy Remix)	5:24
Total length:		61:43

Japanese bonus track
No.	Title	Length
14.	"Putting Holes in Happiness" (Acoustic Version)	4:10
Total length:		65:53

Bonus DVD: Audio
No.	Title	Length
1.	"Putting Holes in Happiness" (Boys Noize Remix)	5:37
2.	"Putting Holes in Happiness" (Robots to Mars Mix)	4:23
3.	"Putting Holes in Happiness" (Guitar Hero Remix)	3:44
4.	"Putting Holes in Happiness" (Ginger Fish Remix)	3:15
5.	"Heart-Shaped Glasses" (Penetrate the Canvas Remix)	4:48
6.	"Heart-Shaped Glasses" (Hamel Remix)	7:01
7.	"You and Me and the Devil Makes 3" (Adam Freeland Remix)	5:38
Total length:		34:21

Bonus DVD: Video
No.	Title	Length
1.	"Heart-Shaped Glasses (When the Heart Guides the Hand)" (explicit)
2.	"Heart-Shaped Glasses (When the Heart Guides the Hand)" (clean)
3.	"Putting Holes in Happiness" (music video)
4.	"Track-by-track Interview" (Interview with Marilyn Manson)

== Personnel ==
Adapted from the AllMusic credits.

=== Marilyn Manson ===
- Marilyn Manson – vocals, percussion, lyrics, composer, producer, photography, art direction and design
- Tim Sköld – guitars, bass, keyboards, music, engineering, programming, producer, composer

=== Production ===
- Sean Beavan – mixing
- Ambooleg – photography
- Perou – photography
- Nela Koenig – photography
- Anthony Silva – photography
- Liam Ward – art direction and design
- Evan Rachel Wood – polaroid photography
- Mark Williams – A&R

== Charts ==
=== Weekly charts ===
Chart (2007–2025)	Peak position
Australian Albums (ARIA)	9
Austrian Albums (Ö3 Austria)	2
Belgian Albums (Ultratop Flanders)	19
Belgian Albums (Ultratop Wallonia)	9
Canadian Albums (Billboard)	8
Croatian Combined Albums (HDU)	23
Czech Albums (ČNS IFPI)	12
Danish Albums (Hitlisten)	18
Dutch Albums (Album Top 100)	38
European Albums (Billboard)	2
Finnish Albums (Suomen virallinen lista)	9
French Albums (SNEP)	5
German Albums (Offizielle Top 100)	4
Greek Albums (IFPI)	7
Hungarian Albums (MAHASZ)	32
Irish Albums (IRMA)	23
Italian Albums (FIMI)	7
Japanese Albums (Oricon)	15
Mexican Albums (Top 100 Mexico)	12
New Zealand Albums (RMNZ)	18
Norwegian Albums (VG-lista)	12
Polish Albums (ZPAV)	36
Scottish Albums (Official Charts)	7
Spanish Albums (Promusicae)	7
Swedish Albums (Sverigetopplistan)	10
Swiss Albums (Schweizer Hitparade)	4
UK Albums (Official Charts)	8
UK Rock & Metal Albums (Official Charts)	1
US Billboard 200	8
US Top Rock Albums (Billboard)	3

=== Year-end charts ===
Chart (2007)	Position
French Albums (SNEP)	137
Swiss Albums (Schweizer Hitparade)	94

== Certifications ==
Region	Certification	Certified units/sales
Russia (NFPF)	Gold	10,000^{*}
United Kingdom (BPI)	Silver	60,000^{‡}
^{^} Shipments figures based on certification alone.^{‡} Sales+streaming figures based on certification alone.

== Release history ==
Region	Date	Label	Format
Worldwide	June 5, 2007	Interscope Records	Compact disc
