= Putting Holes in Happiness =

Single by Marilyn Manson

from the album Eat Me, Drink Me
- Released: 19 October 2007
- Recorded: Hollywood, California, 2007
- Genre: Gothic rock
- Length: 4:31
- Label: Interscope
- Songwriter(s): Marilyn Manson; Tim Sköld
- Producer(s): Marilyn Manson; Tim Sköld

Marilyn Manson singles chronology
"Heart-Shaped Glasses (When the Heart Guides the Hand)" (2007)	"Putting Holes in Happiness" (2007)	"We're from America" (2009)

Audio sample
- "Putting Holes in Happiness": file; help

"Putting Holes in Happiness" is a song by American rock band Marilyn Manson. It was released as the second single from their sixth studio album Eat Me, Drink Me. Written on lead singer Marilyn Manson's birthday (January 5, 2007), the song was initially set as the first single from the album, but this was soon changed at the request of Manson's record label, Interscope, and "Heart-Shaped Glasses (When the Heart Guides the Hand)" was released instead as the album's first single (similar to the case of "Get Your Gunn" from the band's debut). A two-track promotional disc was released in June 2007, but no confirmation of the song as the album's second single followed until Marilyn Manson confirmed the next single to be "Putting Holes in Happiness" on August 7, 2007. The song has already appeared on the radio in France, where a promo of the single has been sent out to several major radio stations.

The music video, directed by French filmmaker Philippe Grandrieux, was released on Yahoo! on August 23, 2007. The video depicts a performance by the band in an unknown, seemingly outdoor area. There is a young girl who Manson is seen with many times in the video, and also a small boy who seems to be frightfully screaming from something not seen. Manson has stated in various interviews that select segments of the video were filmed in Germany during the shooting of the "Heart-Shaped Glasses (When the Heart Guides the Hand)" video in April 2007.

The Guitar Hero Remix by Nick Zinner version of the single was featured on early special editions of Guitar Hero III: Legends of Rock.

== Track listing ==
Promo single

1. "Putting Holes In Happiness" (Radio Edit) — 3:57
2. "Putting Holes In Happiness" (Album Version) — 4:31

Album single

1. "Putting Holes In Happiness" (Album Version) — 4:31
2. "Putting Holes In Happiness" (Boys Noize Remix) — 5:38
3. "Putting Holes In Happiness" (Guitar Hero Remix by Nick Zinner) — 3:44
4. "Putting Holes In Happiness" (Video) — 4:00

ITunes Germany E.P.

1. "Putting Holes In Happiness" (Album Version) — 4:31
2. "Putting Holes In Happiness" (Boys Noize Remix) — 5:38
3. "Putting Holes In Happiness" (Guitar Hero Remix by Nick Zinner) — 3:44
4. "You And Me And The Devil Makes 3" (Remix by Adam Freeland) — 5:39

German Maxi CD

1. "Putting Holes in Happiness" (Radio Edit)
2. "Putting Holes in Happiness (Boyz Noise Remix)"
3. "Putting Holes in Happiness" (Guitar Hero Remix by Nick Zinner)
4. "Putting Holes in Happiness" (Video)

== Remixes ==
1. "Putting Holes In Happiness" (Boys Noize Remix)
2. "Putting Holes In Happiness" (Ginger Fish Remix)
3. "Putting Holes In Happiness" (Nick Zinner Remix – Guitar Hero III: Legends of Rock)
4. "Putting Holes In Happiness" (Robots to Mars Remix)
5. "Putting Holes In Happiness" (DJ Eric Ill & Scott Orlans Mix)

== Charts ==
Chart (2007)	Peak position
Czech Rock Singles (ČNS IFPI)	19
Germany (GfK)	83
