= If I Was Your Vampire =

Song by Marilyn Manson

from the album Eat Me, Drink Me
- Released: April 16, 2007
- Recorded: December 25, 2006
- Genre: Gothic metal
- Length: 5:56
- Label: Interscope
- Songwriters: Marilyn Manson; Tim Sköld
- Producers: Marilyn Manson; Tim Sköld

"If I Was Your Vampire" is a song by American rock band Marilyn Manson. It is the first track on the album Eat Me, Drink Me. Marilyn Manson wrote the song on Christmas Day in 2006. The song was uploaded to Manson's MySpace on April 16, 2007 and was officially released on June 5, 2007 on the album.

== Writing inspiration ==
The song was inspired by an experience in Manson's life where he was finally uplifted by a close friend's morbid gesture of devotion. "She picked up a butcher's knife and said, "Here, you can stab me"," he says. "When someone was willing to drown with me, I really didn't want to drown anymore," says Manson. Manson has also called it "the new Bela Lugosi's Dead. It's the all-time gothic anthem." In an interview with Revolver magazine, Manson said, "It's the centerpiece of the album, I woke up Christmas Day and wrote it. It's kind of my death wish fantasy."

== Composition ==
"If I Was Your Vampire" is a gothic metal ballad.

== Appearances ==
The song was first released on April 16, 2007 when it was uploaded on Manson's MySpace page. It was then released on June 5, 2007 as the first song on Eat Me, Drink Me. An instrumental of the song appears on Bonus Tracks and Instruments from the Album Eat Me, Drink Me, and a remix of the song by Sam Fog of the band Interpol was made available exclusively.

"If I Was Your Vampire" is also heard on the trailers for the film, Underworld: Rise of the Lycans and also for the film adaptation of the video game, Max Payne. "If I Was Your Vampire" was used in the soundtrack to the 2010 parody flick film Vampires Suck. In the film, it used in the end credits.

== Song information ==
The working title for the song was "I'm Not Your Vampire". Manson was inspired to use the term 'Vampire' after watching The Hunger, a 1983 film starring David Bowie. "If I Was Your Vampire" was the opening song on the European leg of the Rape of the World Tour.
