= Arma-goddamn-motherfuckin-geddon =

Single by Marilyn Manson

from the album The High End of Low
- Released: May 18, 2009
- Recorded: Hollywood, California, 2008
- Genre: Gothic rock; glam rock; industrial rock
- Length: 3:39
- Label: Interscope
- Songwriters: Marilyn Manson; Twiggy Ramirez; Chris Vrenna
- Producers: Marilyn Manson; Chris Vrenna; Jeordie White; Sean Beavan

Marilyn Manson singles chronology
"We're from America" (2009)	"Arma-goddamn-motherfuckin-geddon" (2009)	"No Reflection" (2012)

"Arma-goddamn-motherfuckin-geddon" is a song by American rock band Marilyn Manson. It was released as the second single from their seventh studio album The High End of Low. It has been remixed by the Teddybears. The song was released for download on May 5, 2009, along with the pre-order of The High End of Low. The song was included in the game Saints Row: The Third on one of the in-vehicle radio stations.

== Reception ==
Metal Hammer describes "Arma-goddamn-motherfuckin-geddon" as having

"Heavy basslines, a stomping back-beat and a very traditionally Manson glam-chorus are the order of the day. It's this glam rock tinge that really shines through on the track, nodding to his penchant for decadent [1970s] rock but with an old school Manson industrial shade [...] He may not be as dangerous as he once appeared but it is good to hear Mazza using one of those many middle fingers he was born with once again."

Thrash Hits gave the song a positive review, saying "‘Arma-goddamn-motherfucking-geddon’ rides Ramirez’s rubbery honk of a bassline into a fist-pumping, glam-stomp of a chorus," and included it as one of the top tracks of the album.

== Music video ==
=== Concept and filming ===
On April 3, Polydor Records alluded to the previously unconfirmed music video for "Arma-goddamn-motherfuckin-geddon," saying it would be available no earlier than April 17. On April 6, behind-the-scenes video clips and photos of the song's music video, directed by Delaney Bishop, were released.

Manson has revealed that the music video was filmed using "30 or 40 cameras," but only two of these cameras make up the footage seen in the final video. Manson went on to tell that he is interested in releasing "the 30-camera angle version" as well. Manson also claimed that the song was inspired by an instance where he was driving to the studio and witnessed a 'ruckus' with the police, and that it has a very intentional "Adam Ant/Gary Glitter throwback vibe."

=== Release ===
On May 14, the music video debuted on NME.com in censored form.

== Formats and track listings ==
All lyrics by Marilyn Manson; all music by Twiggy and Chris Vrenna.

- UK CD single (6 02527 06494–9)
1. "Arma-goddamn-motherfuckin-geddon" (Album Version) – 3:39
2. "Arma-goddamn-motherfuckin-geddon" (Teddybears Remix) – 3:29
- EU CD single (6 02527 08500–5)
1. "Arma-goddamn-motherfuckin-geddon" (Album Version) – 3:39
2. "Arma-goddamn-motherfuckin-geddon" (Teddybears Remix) – 3:31
3. "Arma-goddamn-motherfuckin-geddon" (Alternate Version) – 3:40
4. "Arma-goddamn-motherfuckin-geddon" (Clown/Slipknot - Fuck the God Damn TV and Radio Remix) – 4:23
- EU 7-inch single (6 02527 06495–6)
1. "Arma-goddamn-motherfuckin-geddon" (Album Version) – 3:39
2. "Arma-goddamn-motherfuckin-geddon" (Alternate Version) – 3:43
- EU promo CD (MMARMCDP1)
1. "Arma-goddamn-motherfuckin-geddon" (Album Version) – 3:39
2. "Arma-goddamn-motherfuckin-geddon" (Clean Radio Edit) – 3:39
3. "Arma-goddamn-motherfuckin-geddon" (Teddybears Remix) – 3:29
4. "Arma-goddamn-motherfuckin-geddon" (Clean Teddybears Remix) – 3:29
- French promo CD
1. "Arma-goddamn-motherfuckin-geddon" (Album Version) – 3:39
2. "We're from America" (Album Version) – 5:04
- US promo CD (INTR–12602–7)
1. "Arma... geddon" (Ultra-Clean Edit) – 3:38
2. "Arma-goddamn-motherfuckin-geddon" (Album Version) – 3:39
3. "Arma... geddon" (Ultra-Clean Teddybears Remix) – 3:29
- US promo 7-inch vinyl (INTR–12602–7)
1. "Arma-goddamn-motherfuckin-geddon" (Album Version) – 3:39
2. "Arma-goddamn-motherfuckin-geddon" (Clown/Slipknot - Fuck the God Damn TV and Radio Remix) – 4:23

== Credits and personnel ==
Credits adapted from the liner notes of The High End of Low and "Arma-goddamn-motherfuckin-geddon".

- Marilyn Manson – vocals and production
- Twiggy – guitars and production
- Chris Vrenna – keyboards, programming, production, engineering and mixing (album version); programming, production, engineering and mixing (alternate version)
- Sean Beavan – production, engineering, mixing and mastering (album version); engineering (alternate version)
- Joakim Åhlund – additional vocals (Teddybears remix)
- Patrik Arve – remixing (Teddybears remix)
- Rod Crawford – additional vocals (Teddybears remix)
- Shawn Crahan – production, engineering, remixing and mixing (Clown remix)
- Robert Orton – mixing (Teddybears remix)
- Matt Sepanic – engineering and mixing (Clown remix)

== Charts ==
Chart (2009)	Peak position
Czech Rock Singles (ČNS IFPI)	12
Germany (GfK)	67
Scotland Singles (OCC)	15
Sweden (Sverigetopplistan)	48
UK Singles (OCC)	114
UK Physical Singles (Official Charts Company)	12
US Mainstream Rock (Billboard)	37
