= Nashville Rebel (box set) =

Box set by Waylon Jennings
- Released: September 26, 2006
- Recorded: September 10, 1958 – November 1994
- Genres: Country; Outlaw country
- Label: RCA Nashville
- Producers: Richie Albright; Chet Atkins; Jimmy Bowen; Jerry Bridges; Larry Butler; Alan Cartee; Brent Cartee; Don Cartee; Johnny Cash; Jack Clement; Danny Davis; Tompall Glaser; Ron Haffkine; Buddy Holly; Waylon Jennings; Ronnie Light; Ken Mansfield; Chips Moman; Bob Montgomery; Willie Nelson; Ray Pennington; Rob Santos; Gary Scruggs; Don Was

Waylon Jennings chronology
Live from Austin, TX (2006)	Nashville Rebel (2006)	Waylon Sings Hank Williams (2006)

Professional ratings
Review scores
Source	Rating
AllMusic	5/5 stars

Nashville Rebel is the twenty-third compilation album and the first box set by Waylon Jennings, released on RCA Nashville through Legacy Recordings in 2006. According to AllMusic's Stephen Thomas Erlewine, it is "the first comprehensive, multi-label Waylon Jennings retrospective ever assembled," comprising ninety-two songs recorded between [1958 and 1994, with selections from the majority of the singer's recording career. The first track of the box set is the Buddy Holly-produced "Jole Blon," released in 1958, while the last is "I Do Believe," a song produced by Don Was that was included on The Highwaymen's 1995 release, The Road Goes On Forever. The other material on the box set covers Jennings' career chronologically, with songs ranging from his years on RCA's roster to later compositions from his short-lived stay at Epic Records; it ignores, however, the tracks from Jennings albums released on independent labels. The majority of the singer's charting singles are included in the package, as are collaborations such as "Mamas Don't Let Your Babies Grow Up to Be Cowboys" with Willie Nelson and "Highwayman" with The Highwaymen. A notable addition is the previously unreleased "The Greatest Cowboy of Them All," a 1978 duet with Johnny Cash which was later recorded by Cash alone for A Believer Sings the Truth (1979) and The Mystery of Life (1991); two others, "It's Sure Been Fun" and "People in Dallas Got Hair," had never been released in the United States. Nashville Rebel was released on four CDs, with a 140-page booklet and liner notes by Rich Kienzle and Lenny Kaye.

== Track listing ==
=== Disc 1 – 1958–1969 ===
1. "Jole Blon" (Buddy Dee) – 1:56
2. "My Baby Walks All Over Me" (Billy Mize) – 2:09
3. "That's the Chance I'll Have to Take" (Waylon Jennings) – 2:06
4. "Stop the World (and Let Me Off)" (Carl R. Belew, W. S. Stevenson) – 2:03
5. "Anita, You're Dreaming" (Jennings, Don Bowman) – 2:26
6. "Time to Bum Again" (Harlan Howard) – 2:02
7. "(That's What You Get) For Lovin' Me" (Gordon Lightfoot) – 2:27
8. "Green River" (Howard) – 2:28
9. "Nashville Rebel" (Howard) – 1:51
10. "Mental Revenge" (Mel Tillis) – 2:23
11. "Love of the Common People" (John Hurley, Ronnie Wilkins) – 2:55
12. "The Chokin' Kind" (Howard) – 2:28
13. "Walk on out of My Mind" (Red Lane) – 2:20
14. "I Got You" (Gordon Galbraith, Ricci Mareno) – 2:38
  - With Anita Carter
15. "Only Daddy That'll Walk the Line" (Jimmy Bryant) – 2:21
16. "Yours Love" (Howard) – 2:18
17. "Just to Satisfy You" (Jennings, Bowman) – 2:18
18. "Something's Wrong in California" (Wayne Carson, Rodney Lay) – 2:30
19. "Brown Eyed Handsome Man" (Chuck Berry) – 2:04
20. "Cedartown, Georgia" (Charles Cobble, Sammi Smith, Mack Vickery, Jimmy Peters) – 2:50
21. "I Ain't the One" (Miriam Eddy) – 2:14
  - With Jessi Colter
22. "Singer of Sad Songs" (Alex Zanetis) – 2:58
23. "It's Sure Been Fun" (Howard) – 2:38
24. "Six White Horses" (Bobby Bond) – 2:38
25. "People in Dallas Got Hair" (Pat Davidson, John Walker) – 2:18

=== Disc 2 – 1970–1974 ===
1. "The Taker" (Kris Kristofferson, Shel Silverstein) – 2:22
2. "Mississippi Woman" (Lane) – 2:50
3. "Lovin' Her Was Easier (Than Anything I'll Ever Do Again)" (Kristofferson) – 3:03
4. "(Don't Let the Sun Set on You) Tulsa" (Wayne Carson Thompson) – 3:07
5. "Sweet Dream Woman" (Al Gorgoni, Chip Taylor) – 3:00
6. "Ladies Love Outlaws" (Lee Clayton) – 2:33
7. "Under Your Spell Again" (Dusty Rhodes, Buck Owens) – 2:56
  - With Jessi Colter
8. "Lonesome, On'ry and Mean" (Steve Young) – 3:40
9. "Pretend I Never Happened" (Willie Nelson) – 3:02
10. "You Can Have Her" (William Cook) – 2:41
11. "Honky Tonk Heroes" (Billy Joe Shaver) – 3:37
12. "Black Rose" (Shaver) – 2:29
13. "We Had It All" (Donnie Fritts, Troy Seals) – 2:46
14. "You Ask Me To" (Jennings, Shaver) – 2:32
15. "This Time" (Jennings) – 2:27
16. "It's Not Supposed to Be That Way" (Nelson) – 3:28
17. "Slow Rollin' Low" (Shaver) – 2:45
18. "I'm a Ramblin' Man" (Ray Pennington) – 2:48
19. "Rainy Day Woman" (Jennings) – 2:31
20. "Amanda" (Bob McDill) – 2:59
21. "Bob Wills Is Still the King" (Jennings) – 3:01
22. "Are You Sure Hank Done It This Way" (Jennings) – 2:56
23. "Waymore's Blues" (Jennings, Curtis Buck) – 2:42
24. "The Door Is Always Open" (McDill, Dickey Lee) – 2:39
25. "Dreaming My Dreams with You" (Allen Reynolds) – 2:25

=== Disc 3 – 1974–1980 ===
1. "'T' for Texas" (Jimmie Rodgers) – 4:00
2. "Freedom to Stay" (Bill Hoover) – 4:02
3. "Good Hearted Woman" (Jennings, Nelson) – 2:56
  - With Willie Nelson
4. "Suspicious Minds" (Mark James) – 3:59
  - With Jessi Colter
5. "Can't You See" (Toy Caldwell) – 3:45
6. "Are You Ready for the Country" (Neil Young) – 3:11
7. "MacArthur Park (Revisited)" (Jimmy Webb) – 6:35
8. "Jack-A-Diamonds" (Daniel Moore) – 3:25
9. "Luckenbach, Texas (Back to the Basics of Love)" (Bobby Emmons, Chips Moman) – 3:20
  - With Willie Nelson
10. "Brand New Goodbye Song" (Moman, Reggie Young) – 2:54
11. "The Wurlitzer Prize (I Don't Want to Get Over You)" (Emmons, Moman) – 2:09
12. "Mamas Don't Let Your Babies Grow Up to Be Cowboys" (Ed Bruce, Patsy Bruce) – 2:33
  - With Willie Nelson
13. "There Ain't No Good Chain Gang" (David Kirby, Hal Bynum) – 3:17
  - With Johnny Cash
14. "I've Always Been Crazy" (Jennings) – 4:14
15. "Don't You Think This Outlaw Bit's Done Got Out of Hand" (Jennings) – 2:59
16. "The Greatest Cowboy of Them All" (Johnny Cash) – 3:42
  - With Johnny Cash
17. "Come with Me" (Chuck Howard) – 3:02
18. "I Ain't Living Long Like This" (Rodney Crowell) – 4:47
19. "Clyde" (J. J. Cale) – 2:41
20. "Theme from The Dukes of Hazzard (Good Ol' Boys)" (Jennings) – 2:07

=== Disc 4 – 1980–1995 ===
1. "Storms Never Last" (Colter) – 3:06
  - With Jessi Colter
2. "Shine" (Jennings) – 2:51
3. "Just to Satisfy You" (Jennings, Bowman) – 2:49
  - With Willie Nelson
4. "Women Do Know How to Carry On" (Jennings, Emmons) – 3:19
5. "(Sittin' on) The Dock of the Bay" (Otis Redding, Steve Cropper) – 3:23
  - With Willie Nelson
6. "Lucille (You Won't Do Your Daddy's Will)" (Albert Collins, Little Richard) – 3:26
7. "Breakin' Down" (Joe Rainey) – 3:22
8. "Take It to the Limit" (Don Henley, Glenn Frey, Randy Meisner) – 3:49
  - With Willie Nelson
9. "The Conversation" (Jennings, Hank Williams Jr., Richie Albright) – 3:52
  - With Hank Williams Jr.
10. "I May Be Used (But Baby I Ain't Used Up)" (McDill) – 3:01
11. "Never Could Toe the Mark" (Jennings) – 2:58
12. "America" (Sammy Johns) – 3:45
13. "Waltz Me to Heaven" (Dolly Parton) – 3:07
14. "Highwayman" (Webb) – 3:03
  - With The Highwaymen
15. "Drinkin' and Dreamin'" (Seals, Max Barnes) – 3:01
16. "Working Without a Net" (Don Cook, Gary Nicholson, John Barlow Jarvis) – 2:43
17. "Will the Wolf Survive" (David Hidalgo, Louie Pérez) – 3:30
18. "What You'll Do When I'm Gone" (Larry Butler) – 2:58
19. "Rose in Paradise" (Stewart Harris, Jim McBride) – 3:42
20. "Rough and Rowdy Days" (Jennings, Roger Murrah) – 2:34
21. "Wrong" (Steve Seskin, Andre Pessis) – 3:00
22. "I Do Believe" (Jennings) – 3:25
  - With the Highwaymen
