= RCA Country Legends (Waylon Jennings album) =

Compilation album by Waylon Jennings
- Released: November 6, 2001
- Recorded: March 18, 1965–January 24, 1985
- Genres: Country; outlaw country
- Length: 1:54:27
- Label: RCA Nashville
- Producer: Rob Santos

Waylon Jennings chronology
Never Say Die: Live (2000)	RCA Country Legends (2001)	Ultimate Waylon Jennings (2004)

RCA Country Legends is the nineteenth compilation album by American country music artist Waylon Jennings. It is part of a series of similar RCA Country Legends albums released by RCA Records. It was released on November 6, 2001 and covers Jennings' biggest hits from 1965-1985.

== Track listing ==
Disc 1
No.	Title	Writer(s)	Length
1.	"Stop the World and Let Me Off"	Carl Belew, W. S. Stevenson	2:27
2.	"(That's What You Get) For Lovin' Me"	Gordon Lightfoot	2:29
3.	"The Chokin' Kind"	Harlan Howard	2:21
4.	"Walk on Out of My Mind"	Red Lane	2:22
5.	"Only Daddy That'll Walk the Line"	Jimmy Bryant	2:04
6.	"Yours Love"	Howard	2:18
7.	"Brown Eyed Handsome Man"	Chuck Berry	2:04
8.	"The Taker"	Kris Kristofferson, Shel Silverstein	2:22
9.	"Cedartown, Georgia"	Charles Cobble, Jimmy Peters, Sammi Smith, Mack Vickery	2:50
10.	"Sweet Dream Woman"	Al Gorgoni, Chip Taylor	3:00
11.	"Pretend I Never Happened"	Willie Nelson	3:01
12.	"You Can Have Her"	Bill Cook	2:39
13.	"You Asked Me To"	Waylon Jennings, Billy Joe Shaver	2:32
14.	"This Time"	Jennings	2:26
15.	"I'm a Ramblin' Man"	Ray Pennington	2:48
16.	"Rainy Day Woman"	Jennings	2:32
17.	"Dreaming My Dreams with You"	Allen Reynolds	2:27
18.	"Are You Sure Hank Done It This Way"	Jennings	2:56
19.	"Bob Wills Is Still the King"	Jennings	3:00
20.	"Good Hearted Woman" (with Willie Nelson)	Jennings, Nelson	2:55

Disc 2
No.	Title	Writer(s)	Length
1.	"Can't You See"	Toy Caldwell	3:47
2.	"Are You Ready for the Country"	Neil Young	3:12
3.	"Luckenbach, Texas (Back to the Basics of Love)"	Bobby Emmons, Chips Moman	3:19
4.	"The Wurlitzer Prize (I Don't Want to Get Over You)"	Emmons, Moman	2:10
5.	"Mammas Don't Let Your Babies Grow Up to Be Cowboys" (with Willie Nelson)	Ed Bruce, Patsy Bruce	2:34
6.	"I've Always Been Crazy"	Jennings	4:13
7.	"Don't You Think This Outlaw Bit's Done Got Out of Hand"	Jennings	3:00
8.	"Amanda"	Bob McDill	3:01
9.	"Come with Me"	Chuck Howard	3:02
10.	"I Ain't Living Long Like This"	Rodney Crowell	4:49
11.	"Clyde"	JJ Cale	2:43
12.	"Theme from The Dukes of Hazzard (Good Ol' Boys)"	Jennings	2:09
13.	"Storms Never Last" (with Jessi Colter)	Jessi Colter	3:05
14.	"Shine"	Jennings	2:51
15.	"Lucille (You Won't Do Your Daddy's Will)"	Al Collins, Little Richard	3:27
16.	"I May Be Used (But Baby I Ain't Used Up)"	McDill	2:58
17.	"Never Could Toe the Mark"	Jennings	2:59
18.	"America"	Sammy Johns	3:27
19.	"Waltz Me to Heaven"	Dolly Parton	3:08
20.	"Drinkin' and Dreamin'"	Max D. Barnes, Troy Seals	3:00

== Critical reception ==
Professional ratings
Review scores
Source	Rating
Allmusic	5/5 stars

RCA Country Legends received a perfect five-star rating from Stephen Thomas Erlewine of Allmusic. In his review, Erlewine praises the album as an effective introduction to Jennings and an essential part of not only any country collection but any collection of American music of the 20th century.

== Chart performance ==
RCA Country Legends peaked at #19 on the U.S. Billboard Top Country Albums chart the week of April 20, 2002 and #155 on the Billboard 200.

=== Weekly charts ===
Chart (2002)	Peak position
US Billboard 200	155
US Top Country Albums (Billboard)	19

=== Year-end charts ===
Chart (2002)	Position
US Top Country Albums (Billboard)	75
