= Waylon's Greatest Hits, Vol. 2 =

Greatest hits album by Waylon Jennings
- Released: October 1984
- Genre: Country; outlaw country
- Length: 33:17
- Label: RCA Victor

Waylon Jennings chronology
Never Could Toe the Mark (1984)	Waylon's Greatest Hits, Vol. 2 (1984)	Turn the Page (1985)

Professional ratings
Review scores
Source	Rating
Allmusic	4/5 stars

Waylon's Greatest Hits, Vol. 2 is the eighth compilation album by American country music artist Waylon Jennings, released on RCA Victor in 1984. It contains several songs recorded primarily in the later period of the singer's career, encompassing the late 1970s as well as the early 1980s. Although several relatively obscure tracks were included, the compilation also contains the hits "Theme from the Dukes of Hazzard (Good Ol' Boys)" and "Don't You Think This Outlaw Bit's Done Got Out of Hand". "Looking for Suzanne", "America" and "Waltz Me to Heaven" are all previously unreleased Jennings recordings; the first of these made a reappearance on Jennings' Sweet Mother Texas (1986). "America" and "Waltz Me to Heaven" charted as singles, reaching #6 and #10, respectively, with a music video being released for the former; the album peaked at #27 on the country charts.

== Track listing ==
1. "Looking for Suzanne" (Paul Kennerley) – 3:35
2. "The Conversation" (Albright, Jennings, Williams) – 3:48
  From Waylon and Company (1983)
3. "Waltz Me to Heaven" (Dolly Parton) – 3:06
4. "Theme from The Dukes of Hazzard (Good Ol' Boys)" (Jennings) – 2:06
  From Music Man (1980)
5. "Don't You Think This Outlaw Bit's Done Got Out of Hand" (Jennings) – 2:56
  From I've Always Been Crazy (1978)
6. "I Ain't Living Long Like This" (Crowell) – 5:01
  From What Goes Around Comes Around (1979)
7. "Come with Me" (Harlan Howard) – 2:59
  From What Goes Around Comes Around (1979)
8. "America" (Johns) – 3:43
9. "Shine" (Jennings) – 2:47
  From Black on Black (1982)
10. "Women Do Know How to Carry On" (Emmons, Jennings) – 3:16
  From Black on Black (1982)

== Chart performance ==
Chart (1984)	Peak position
U.S. Billboard Top Country Albums	27
