= Ultimate Waylon Jennings =

Compilation album by Waylon Jennings
- Released: March 23, 2004
- Genres: Country; outlaw country
- Length: 66:44
- Label: RCA Nashville

Waylon Jennings chronology
Waylon Live: The Expanded Edition (2003)	Ultimate Waylon Jennings (2004)	The Complete MCA Recordings (2004)

Professional ratings
Review scores
Source	Rating
Allmusic	3/5 stars

Ultimate Waylon Jennings is the twentieth compilation album by American country music artist Waylon Jennings. It was released by RCA Nashville on March 23, 2004. The album peaked at number 16 on the Billboard Top Country Albums chart. The album has sold 754,000 copies in the United States as of October 2017.

== Track listing ==
No.	Title	Writer(s)	Length
1.	"Only Daddy That'll Walk the Line"	Jimmy Bryant	2:21
2.	"The Taker"	Kris Kristofferson, Shel Silverstein	2:22
3.	"This Time"	Waylon Jennings	2:26
4.	"I'm a Ramblin' Man"	Ray Pennington	2:48
5.	"Rainy Day Woman"	Jennings	2:31
6.	"Are You Sure Hank Done It This Way"	Jennings	2:55
7.	"Good Hearted Woman" (with Willie Nelson [live vers.])	Jennings, Willie Nelson	2:58
8.	"Are You Ready for the Country"	Neil Young	3:11
9.	"Luckenbach, Texas (Back to the Basics of Love)"	Bobby Emmons, Chips Moman	3:20
10.	"Mammas Don't Let Your Babies Grow Up to Be Cowboys" (with Willie Nelson)	Ed Bruce, Patsy Bruce	2:33
11.	"I've Always Been Crazy"	Jennings	4:13
12.	"Don't You Think This Outlaw Bit's Done Got Out of Hand"	Jennings	2:58
13.	"Amanda"	Bob McDill	2:59
14.	"Come with Me"	Chuck Howard	3:02
15.	"I Ain't Living Long Like This"	Rodney Crowell	4:46
16.	"Theme from The Dukes of Hazzard (Good Ol' Boys)"	Jennings	2:08
17.	"Just to Satisfy You" (with Willie Nelson)	Don Bowman, Jennings	2:49
18.	"Women Do Know How to Carry On"	Emmons, Jennings	3:18
19.	"I May Be Used (But Baby I Ain't Used Up)"	McDill	3:01
20.	"America"	Sammy Johns	3:45
21.	"Highwayman" (The Highwaymen)	Jimmy Webb	3:03
22.	"Rose in Paradise"	Stewart Harris, Jim McBride	3:17

== Chart performance ==
Chart (2004)	Peak position
U.S. Billboard Top Country Albums	16
U.S. Billboard 200	139
