= Highwayman (The Highwaymen album) =

Studio album by The Highwaymen
- Released: May 6, 1985
- Recorded: 1984
- Studios: Moman's Recording (Nashville, Tennessee); Woodland (Nashville, Tennessee)
- Genre: Country
- Length: 33:43
- Label: Columbia Nashville
- Producer: Chips Moman

The Highwaymen chronology
Highwayman (1985)	Highwayman 2 (1990)

Johnny Cash chronology
Biggest Hits (1984)	Highwayman (1985)	Rainbow (1985)

Waylon Jennings chronology
Turn the Page (1985)	Highwayman (1985)	Sweet Mother Texas (1986)

Kris Kristofferson chronology
Music from Songwriter (1984)	Highwayman (1985)	Repossessed (1986)

Willie Nelson chronology
Brand on my Heart (1985)	Highwayman (1985)	The Promiseland (1986)

Singles from Highwayman
- 1. "Highwayman" Released: May 6, 1985; 2. "Desperados Waiting for a Train" Released: September 14, 1985

Highwayman is the first studio album released by country supergroup The Highwaymen, comprising Kris Kristofferson, Johnny Cash, Waylon Jennings and Willie Nelson. Highwayman, released on Columbia Records in 1985, was the group's first and most successful album.

== Background ==
All four musicians had long been admirers of each other's work. Cash, who got his start at Sun Records in the mid-fifties, shared an apartment with Jennings between marriages in the late sixties, a time when both Jennings and Nelson were growing weary of Nashville’s stale recording practices. When Kristofferson emerged as a new voice for progressive country songwriting around this time, all three covered his songs, with Cash’s version of "Sunday Morning Coming Down" becoming a smash, and heralded the younger musician as a unique talent. Jennings, Nelson, and Kristofferson would go on to enjoy immense success as part of the Outlaw movement in the seventies, with Waylon and Willie recording several albums and embarking on lucrative tours. By the mid-eighties, Nelson remained the most relevant on the charts while the careers of the other three had lulled somewhat. As Nelson biographer Joe Nick Patoski puts it, "The strength-in-numbers collaboration aimed to bolster the careers of four giants old enough to be regarded as legends but who were no longer considered suitable for contemporary country radio." In his 1996 memoir Waylon, Jennings recalled:

John had brought our four personalities together initially, in Montreaux, Switzerland, in 1984. Every year, he had a television Christmas special, and that holiday season he wanted us all to come over...We started trading songs in the hotel after we worked on the special, and someone said, like they always do, we oughta cut the album...Usually everyone goes their separate ways after that, but the idea took hold.

In contrast to his close relationship with Jennings and Kristofferson, Cash barely knew Nelson, but within days, the foursome were in a Nashville studio with Moman (who had produced Nelson's two previous albums) trying out some material. Kristofferson later marvelled, "I always looked up to all of them and felt like I was kind of a kid who had climbed up on Mount Rushmore and stuck his face out there."

== Recording and composition ==
Highwayman, consisting of ten tracks, was released as a follow-up to the successful single of the same name and the title track of the album itself. "Highwayman", a Jimmy Webb cover, hit the top of the country charts and was followed up by the Top 20 hit "Desperados Waiting for a Train", whose original version was released by Guy Clark. The album was entirely produced by Chips Moman. Marty Stuart also played guitar and mandolin on the sessions. From the first playback, there was magic in their collective voices, and with Moman's encouragement, the group, which they called the Highwaymen, assembled some other songs that spoke to the nostalgic appeal of these four veteran talents coming together. Nelson later admitted, "You wouldn't think our four uneven voices would blend. But they did. They fit together like a jigsaw puzzle." The version of "Big River" on this album is significant because it includes a Jennings-sung verse that Cash omitted from the original recording. The album is also notable for the song "The Twentieth Century Is Almost Over," written by Steve Goodman, who had died of leukemia the year before, and John Prine, who Kristofferson in particular had been a fan and supporter of for years.

The group wasn't named the Highwaymen from the beginning. On their first two albums, they are credited as "Nelson, Jennings, Cash, Kristofferson". The official name which came to be widely recognized began to be used only in later years, and their last collaborative effort, The Road Goes on Forever, was already credited to the Highwaymen.

== Critical reception ==
Professional ratings
Review scores
Source	Rating
Allmusic	4/5 stars

William Ruhlmann of Allmusic rated the album four out of five stars; he wrote that "the rest of the record...lives up to the leadoff hit." Kristofferson biographer Stephen Miller writes, "At times Highwayman sounded over-produced, not least because of the occasional presence of synthesizers, and while it had a definite country feel, at times it leant towards an AOR style."

== Track listing ==
No.	Title	Writer(s)	Lead vocals	Length
1.	"Highwayman"	Jimmy Webb	Willie Nelson, Kris Kristofferson, Waylon Jennings, Johnny Cash	3:00
2.	"The Last Cowboy Song"	Ed Bruce, Ron Peterson	Jennings, Nelson, Cash, Kristofferson	3:08
3.	"Jim, I Wore a Tie Today"	Cindy Walker	Cash, Nelson	3:20
4.	"Big River"	Johnny Cash	Jennings, Nelson, Cash, Kristofferson	2:45
5.	"Committed to Parkview"	Cash	Cash, Nelson	3:18
6.	"Desperados Waiting for a Train"	Guy Clark	Jennings, Nelson, Cash, Kristofferson	4:34
7.	"Deportee (Plane Wreck at Los Gatos)" (with Johnny Rodriguez)	Woody Guthrie, Martin Hoffman	Cash, Nelson, Johnny Rodriguez	3:45
8.	"Welfare Line"	Paul Kennerley	Jennings, Nelson, Cash, Kristofferson	2:34
9.	"Against the Wind"	Bob Seger	Cash, Nelson, Jennings	3:46
10.	"The Twentieth Century Is Almost Over"	Steve Goodman, John Prine	Cash, Nelson	3:33

== Charts ==
=== Weekly charts ===
Chart (1985)	Peak position
Australia Albums (Kent Music Report)	23
US Billboard 200	92
US Top Country Albums (Billboard)	1

=== Year-end charts ===
Chart (1985)	Position
US Top Country Albums (Billboard)	20

== Certifications ==
Region	Certification	Certified units/sales
Australia (ARIA)	Platinum	70,000^{^}
United States (RIAA)	Platinum	1,000,000^{^}
^{^} Shipments figures based on certification alone.

== Personnel ==
From Highwayman liner notes.

The Highwaymen

- Johnny Cash - vocals
- Waylon Jennings - vocals, guitar
- Willie Nelson - vocals, guitar
- Kris Kristofferson - vocals

Musicians

- Johnny Rodriguez - lead and backing vocals on "Deportee (Plane Wreck at Los Gatos)"
- Chips Moman - backing vocals, guitars
- J. R. Cobb - guitars
- Marty Stuart - guitar, mandolin
- Reggie Young - guitars
- Mike Leech - bass guitar
- Jimmy Tittle - bass guitar
- Bobby Wood - keyboards
- Bobby Emmons - keyboards
- Paul Davis - backing vocals, keyboards
- Gene Chrisman - drums
- Mickey Raphael - harmonica

Technical

- Chips Moman - producer, engineering
- David Cherry - engineering
- Ken Criblez - assistant engineer
- Larry Greenhill - assistant engineer
- Denny Purcell - mastering

== Bibliography ==
- Jennings, Waylon; Kaye, Lenny (1996). Waylon: An Autobiography. Warner Brooks. ISBN 978-0-446-51865-9.
- Nelson, Willie; Ritz, David (2015). It's A Long Story: My Life. Little, Brown and Company. ISBN 9780316339315.
- Patoski, Joe Nick (2008). Willie Nelson: An Epic Life. Hachette Digital. ISBN 978-0-316-01778-7.
- Miller, Stephen (December 17, 2009). Kristofferson: The Wild American. Omnibus Press. ISBN 978-0-85712-109-7.
- Hilburn, Robert (October 31, 2013). Johnny Cash: The Life. Orion. ISBN 978-0-297-86658-9.
