= Goin' Down Rockin': The Last Recordings =

Studio album by Waylon Jennings
- Released: September 25, 2012
- Recorded: Circa. 1999
- Genres: Country; outlaw country
- Length: 44:38
- Label: Saguaro Road
- Producer: Robby Turner

Waylon Jennings chronology
Waylon Forever (2008)	Goin' Down Rockin': The Last Recordings (2012)	Old 97's & Waylon Jennings (2013)

Singles from Goin' Down Rockin': The Last Recordings
- 1. "Goin' Down Rockin'" Released: July 23, 2012

Professional ratings
Review scores
Source	Rating
Allmusic	3.5/5 stars

Goin' Down Rockin': The Last Recordings is the forty-sixth studio album by American country music artist Waylon Jennings, released on September 25, 2012. The release includes eight unreleased songs written and recorded by Jennings along with his bassist Robby Turner during the last years of his life, as well as eight songs never released before in any version. It was also his second posthumous album.

Jennings recorded the songs only playing his guitar and singing while accompanied by Turner on the bass. Further instrumentation was planned, but it was stopped due to Jennings' death in 2002. Turner completed the recordings ten years later with the help of members of Jennings' band The Waylors.

== Recording ==
During his last years of life, Jennings recorded several tracks along with his steel guitarist/bassist Robby Turner. The recordings consisted on twelve songs that Jennings considered that expressed his feelings and reflections at the time. Featuring vocals and guitar playing by Jennings, with the accompaniment of Turner on the bass, further instrumentation was planned to be added, but the project was stopped when Jennings died in 2002. Ten years later, Turner gathered along with Reggie Young, Richie Albright, Tony Joe White, and other members of Jennings' band, The Waymore Blues Band, to complete the tracks. Eight of the twelve unreleased songs were written by Jennings, with the addition of Tony Joe White's original "Goin' Down Rockin" and Willie Nelson's "Sad Songs and Waltzes".

A version of "She's No Good for Me" was originally recorded for Waymore's Blues (Part II) (as "No Good for Me") and a version of "Wasting Time" was recorded on Right for the Time (written as "Wastin' Time"). "I Do Believe" was performed solo by Waylon for The Highwaymen's 1995 album The Road Goes On Forever, while "Never Say Die" and "Goin' Down Rockin'" were both featured on the live album Never Say Die: Live shortly before Jennings's death.

== Release ==
The existence of the recordings was known only to Jennings and Robby Turner. The family was not comfortable with marketing Jennings' image after his death, feeling that they would "capitalize" on it. Ten years later, Turner decided to release the album. The album was released on September 25, 2012, by Saguaro Road Records.

The family asked Kris Kristofferson to write something about Waylon Jennings. What Kristofferson wrote can be seen on the cover.

== Track listing ==
All tracks are written by Waylon Jennings, with additional co-writers as noted.

No.	Title	Writer(s)	Length
1.	"Goin' Down Rockin'"	Leann White; Tony Joe White	3:58
2.	"Belle of the Ball"		4:55
3.	"If My Harley Was Runnin'"	Bobby Emmons; Troy Seals	3:28
4.	"I Do Believe"		3:32
5.	"Friends in California"	Bill LaBounty	3:07
6.	"The Ways of the World"		5:32
7.	"Shakin' the Blues"		3:07
8.	"Never Say Die"		3:40
9.	"Wasting Time"		3:03
10.	"Sad Songs and Waltzes"	Willie Nelson	2:27
11.	"She Was No Good for Me"		4:20
12.	"Wrong Road to Nashville"		3:29

== Personnel ==
- Waylon Jennings - acoustic guitar, lead vocals
- Richie Albright - drums, percussion
- Jim "Moose" Brown - electric guitar, Hammond B-3 organ
- Chad Cromwell - drums, percussion, tambourine
- Larry Franklin - fiddle
- Barny Robertson - Hammond B-3 organ, piano
- Carter Robertson - humming, backing vocals
- Aaron Rodgers - electric guitar
- John Wesley Ryles - backing vocals
- Joe Spivey - fiddle
- Robby Turner - bass guitar, upright bass, dobro, Fender Rhodes, acoustic guitar, Hammond B-3 organ, handclapping, keyboards, pedal steel guitar, piano, electric piano, synthesizer, tambourine, backing vocals, Wurlitzer piano
- Billy Joe Walker Jr. - acoustic guitar
- Tommy White - dobro
- Tony Joe White - electric guitar, harmonica, background vocals
- Jenny Lynn Young - cello
- Reggie Young - electric guitar

== Charts ==
Chart performance for Goin' Down Rockin': The Last Recordings
Chart (2012)	Peak position
UK Country Albums (Official Charts)	8
US Billboard 200	67
US Top Country Albums (Billboard)	14
