= Will the Wolf Survive =

1986 album by Waylon Jennings

Studio album by Waylon Jennings
- Released: March 10, 1986
- Recorded: 1986
- Studio: Emerald Sound (Nashville, Tennessee)
- Genre: Country; outlaw country
- Length: 30:02
- Label: MCA
- Producer: Jimmy Bowen; Waylon Jennings

Waylon Jennings chronology
Sweet Mother Texas (1986)	Will the Wolf Survive (1986)	Heroes (1986)

Singles from Will the Wolf Survive
- 1. "Working Without a Net" Released: February 15, 1986; 2. "Will the Wolf Survive" Released: May 17, 1986; 3. "What You'll Do When I'm Gone" Released: September 20, 1986

Professional ratings
Review scores
Source	Rating
Allmusic	3/5 stars

Will the Wolf Survive is the thirty-fourth studio album by American country music artist Waylon Jennings. It was released in 1986 as his debut for MCA Records.

== Recording and composition ==
Will the Wolf Survive was Jennings' first release on MCA after moving from RCA, where he had recorded since 1966. His debut album with the label was produced by Jimmy Bowen, who updated the singer's sound from the outlaw country sound that some critics felt had gone stale on albums like Black on Black and It's Only Rock & Roll. Drug-free for nearly two years, the album was a fresh start for Jennings, who had seen his commercial standing slip in recent years after ruling the country charts for most of the 1970s and early 1980s. Jennings, who resurfaced in the public consciousness as part of the successful Highwaymen collaboration with fellow outlaws Willie Nelson, Kris Kristofferson, and Johnny Cash, embraced the changes to his sound after spending many years fighting the Nashville system for the right to produce his own records and use his own band in the studio. Jennings later noted, "Compared with some of my earlier works, it might not have fit people's expectations of me. That was the point." However, in his 1996 memoir Waylon, Jennings cited his own lack of confidence as a major obstacle during the sessions:

It was the first time in years I'd recorded without my band...I didn't play guitar on the sessions; I was a 'vocalist.' Nor did I write any of the songs...I was trying to sound like what I thought he [Bowen] wanted me to sound like instead of me. I'd think, what the hell, I sang that good, and in the end, I was imitating myself, trying too hard to satisfy people who thought I had ruined my music by straightening up. Bowen knew that. It was all down to me.

== Critical reception ==
Will the Wolf Survive topped the Billboard country albums chart in 1986, Jennings' first LP to do so since 1980's Music Man. AllMusic deems it "one of his better albums."

== Track listing ==
No.	Title	Writer(s)	Length
1.	"Will the Wolf Survive?"	David Hidalgo, Louie Pérez	3:29
2.	"They Ain't Got 'Em All"	John Scott Sherrill	2:44
3.	"Working Without a Net"	Don Cook, John Barlow Jarvis, Gary Nicholson	2:42
4.	"Where Does Love Go"	Steve Bogard, Rick Giles	2:16
5.	"That Dog Won't Hunt"	Roger Murrah, John Schweers	2:55
6.	"What You'll Do When I'm Gone"	Larry Butler	2:57
7.	"Suddenly Single"	Troy Seals, Max D. Barnes	2:46
8.	"The Shadow of Your Distant Friend"	Murrah, Steve Dean	4:01
9.	"I've Got Me a Woman"	Paul Kennerley	2:44
10.	"The Devil's Right Hand"	Steve Earle	3:28

== Personnel ==
=== Musicians ===
- Waylon Jennings - lead vocals, backing vocals
- Richard Bennett - acoustic and electric guitars
- Gary Scruggs - acoustic guitar, 12-string electric guitar
- Billy Joe Walker Jr. - acoustic and electric guitars
- Reggie Young - electric guitar
- Jerry Bridges - bass guitar
- John Barlow Jarvis - piano
- Matt Betton - drums
- John Barlow Jarvis - Yamaha DX7 synthesizer
- Gary Scruggs - harmonica
- Mark O'Connor - mandolin
- Hollis Halford, Mat Morse - Synclavier
- David Innis - synthesizer

=== Production ===
- Produced By Waylon Jennings & Jimmy Bowen
- Production Assistant: Chip Hardy
- Engineers: Bob Bullock, Mark J. Coddington, Russ Martin, Willie Pevear, Robbie Rose & Ron Treat
- Mixing: Bob Bullock
- Digital Editing: Milan Bogdan
- Mastering (Master Tape Preparation): Glenn Meadows

== Chart performance ==
Chart (1986)	Peak position
U.S. Billboard Top Country Albums	1
