= It's Only Rock & Roll (Waylon Jennings album) =

Studio album by Waylon Jennings
- Released: June 13, 1983
- Genres: Country; outlaw country
- Label: RCA Victor
- Producers: Waylon Jennings; Randy Scruggs

Waylon Jennings chronology
WWII (1982)	It's Only Rock & Roll (1983)	Take It to the Limit (1983)

Singles from It's Only Rock & Roll
- 1. "Lucille (You Won't Do Daddy's Will)" Released: 1983

It's Only Rock & Roll is the twenty-ninth studio album by Waylon Jennings, released on RCA Victor in 1983.

== Recording ==
Understandably, considering his condition at the time, Jennings was not fond of his work during this period: "I was doing bad records. Missing shows due to laryngitis. Not picking up the guitar unless I was getting paid. Not caring."

== Reception ==
Professional ratings
Review scores
Source	Rating
AllMusic	2/5 stars

It's Only Rock & Roll peaked at number 10 on the Billboard country albums chart, Jennings' worst showing since Honky Tonk Heroes in 1973.

Crispin Sartwell of Record was dismissive of the album's closing medley, saying that all of its material had been done far better on other albums, but asserted that every other track on It's Only Rock & Roll is "old-fashioned, kick-butt country and rock." He especially praised Jennings's rendition of "Lucille" for its simplicity and straightforwardness.

Jim Worbois of AllMusic's brief retrospective review read: "While many labels were raiding their vaults to create "medley" records of artists no longer signed with them ... Jennings seems to have done it to himself. There are a couple nice songs on here, but it's not one of his best."

== Track listing ==
1. "It's Only Rock & Roll" (Rodney Crowell)
2. "Living Legends" (Waylon Jennings)
3. "Breakin' Down" (Joe Rainey)
4. "Let Her Do the Walking" (Jennings)
5. "Mental Revenge" (Mel Tillis)
6. "Lucille (You Won't Do Your Daddy's Will)" (Albert Collins, Richard Penniman)
7. "Angel Eyes" (Crowell)
8. "No Middle Ground" (Jennings, Gary Scruggs)
9. "Love's Legalities" (Michael Smotherman)
10. Medley:

1. "I'm a Ramblin' Man" (Ray Pennington)
2. "This Time" (Jennings)
3. "Don't You Think This Outlaw Bit's Done Got Out of Hand" (Jennings)
4. "Clyde" (J. J. Cale)
5. "Good Hearted Woman" (Jennings, Willie Nelson)
6. "Ladies Love Outlaws" (Lee Clayton)
7. "Luckenbach, Texas (Back to the Basics of Love)" (Chips Moman, Bobby Emmons)
8. "I've Always Been Crazy" (Jennings)

== Chart performance ==
Chart (1983)	Peak position
U.S. Billboard Top Country Albums	10
U.S. Billboard 200	109
