= Third World Warrior =

Studio album by Kris Kristofferson
- Released: March 6, 1990
- Genre: Country
- Length: 36:44
- Label: Mercury
- Producer: Larry Hirsch, Danny Lawson

Kris Kristofferson chronology
Repossessed (1986)	Third World Warrior (1990)	Live at the Philharmonic (1992)

Professional ratings
Review scores
Source	Rating
AllMusic	2/5 stars
Rolling Stone	2/5 stars

Third World Warrior is an album by Kris Kristofferson, released on Mercury Records in 1990 (see 1990 in music). It is a concept album composed of topical songs on politics, primarily expressing left-wing support. The album was commercially unsuccessful, due in part to Kristofferson's declining career as a singer and the release of The Highwaymen's second album, Highwayman 2, the week before.

Kristofferson expressed support for Nelson Mandela and the Sandinista National Liberation Front; not long prior to the album's release, Mandela was freed from prison and the Sandinistas were defeated in elections, transferring power to the National Opposition Union.

Third World Warrior was originally released on both LP and CD, and was reissued on CD by Oh Boy Records via Universal Music Special Markets in 2004, along with Kristofferson's other Mercury album, Repossessed.

On the tribute CD The Pilgrim: A Celebration of Kris Kristofferson, Country singer Patty Griffin covers the controversial but melodic song "Sandinista".

Margo Price's song "Don't Let the Bastards Get You Down" is an homage to Kristofferson Hers ends with an audioclip of Kristofferson speaking the phrase.

== Track listing ==
All songs written by Kris Kristofferson except where noted.

1. "The Eagle and the Bear" – 3:34
2. "Third World Warrior" – 3:06
3. "Aguila del Norte" – 4:00
4. "The Hero" – 2:48
5. "Don't Let the Bastards (Get You Down)" – 3:44
6. "Love of Money" (Kristofferson, Danny Lawson, Glen Clark, Billy Swan, J. J. Meeker) – 3:40
7. "Third World War" (Kristofferson, Danny Timms) – 4:47
8. "Jesse Jackson" – 2:23
9. "Mal Sacate" – 3:34
10. "Sandinista" – 5:08
