= Robby Turner =

American pedal steel guitarist (1962/1963–2025)

- Born: 1962 or 1963
- Died: September 4, 2025 (aged 62)
- Genres: Country; country rock
- Occupation: Musician
- Instruments: Pedal steel guitar; bass; resonator guitar; mandolin
- Years active: 1976–2025

Robby Turner (1962 or 1963 – September 4, 2025) was an American pedal steel guitarist, best known for his work with Waylon Jennings and his contributions to recordings by many other artists.

== Life and career ==
=== Early years ===
Turner grew up in a musical family; his parents Doyle and Bernice Turner played in Hank Williams' band The Drifting Cowboys from 1944 until 1946. At age six, Turner played drums in his father's band, and at age nine he played drums for the Wilburn Brothers. Turner began playing the pedal steel guitar at age ten, and at age twelve was the youngest musician chosen by Shot Jackson to endorse and represent the Sho-Bud pedal steel guitar. In 1976, at age 14, he performed with Ace Cannon's band.

=== Music career ===
In his career, Turner has played, recorded, and toured with a number of artists, including George Jones, Chet Atkins, Loretta Lynn, B. B. King, Bob Dylan, Eric Clapton, Frank Sinatra, Herbie Hancock, Gary Allan, Ray Charles, and Stevie Ray Vaughan. He has also performed and recorded with contemporary artists, such as Chris Stapleton and Sturgill Simpson.

In 1989, Turner recorded and toured with The Highwaymen (Waylon Jennings, Willie Nelson, Johnny Cash, and Kris Kristofferson). From this came a friendship with Jennings and his wife Jessi Colter lasting until Jennings' death in 2002.

Turner toured the United States, Europe, and Australia with the Dixie Chicks in 2003 on their "Top of the World" tour.

Turner produced music in his studio Turner-Up Recording, in Nashville, which is where Waylon Jennings recorded 2012's Goin' Down Rockin': The Last Recordings.

=== Death ===
Turner died on September 4, 2025, at the age of 62.

== Discography ==
=== Solo recordings ===
- 1996: Man of Steel (self-released)
- 1998: Steel Country (self-released)

=== With Waylon Jennings ===
- 1976: Wanted! The Outlaws (RCA) with Willie Nelson, Jessi Colter, and Tompall Glaser reissued in 1996
- 1992: Too Dumb for New York City, Too Ugly for L.A. (Epic)
- 1994: Waymore's Blues (Part II) (RCA)
- 1996: Right for the Time (Justice)
- 1998: Closing In on the Fire (ARK 21)
- 1998: Cowboys, Sisters, Rascals & Dirt (RCA Nashville)
- 2007: Never Say Die: The Final Concert (Legacy)
- 2008: Waylon Forever (Vagrant) with The .357s
- 2012: Goin' Down Rockin': The Last Recordings (Saguaro Road)

=== As producer ===
- 1993: Ace Cannon – Sweet Dreams (WIRL)

=== Also appears on ===
==== 1990–1999 ====
- 1990: The Highwaymen – Highwayman 2 (Columbia Nashville)
- 1992: Toy Caldwell – Toy Caldwell (Cabin Fever)
- 1993: Gin Blossoms – New Miserable Experience (A&M)
- 1993: Willie Nelson – Across the Borderline (Columbia)
- 1994: Vince Gill – When Love Finds You (MCA)
- 1995: The Highwaymen – The Road Goes on Forever (Capitol / EMI)
- 1995: Jerry Lee Lewis – Young Blood (Sire)
- 1996: Jeff Foxworthy – Crank It Up: The Music Album (Warner Bros.)
- 1996: Jim Lauderdale – Persimmons (Upstart)
- 1996: Riders in the Sky – Public Cowboy #1: The Music of Gene Autry (Rounder)
- 1996: Travis Tritt – The Restless Kind (Warner Bros.)
- 1997: Kieran McGee – Left for Dead (Clean Cuts)
- 1997: John Prine – Live on Tour (Oh Boy)
- 1997: Tanya Tucker – Complicated (Capitol Nashville)
- 1997: Chely Wright – Let Me In (MCA Nashville)
- 1998: Tracy Byrd – I'm from the Country (MCA)
- 1998: Deryl Dodd – Deryl Dodd (Columbia)
- 1998: Jim Lauderdale – Whisper (BNA)
- 1998: The Mavericks – Trampoline (MCA)
- 1998: Riders in the Sky – Yodel the Cowboy Way (Easydisc)
- 1998: Travis Tritt – No More Looking Over My Shoulder (Warner Bros.)
- 1999: David Ball – Play (Warner Bros.)
- 1999: Matt King – Hard Country (Atlantic)
- 1999: Chely Wright – Single White Female (MCA Nashville)

==== 2000–2009 ====
- 2000: Sara Evans – Born To Fly (RCA)
- 2000: Jim Lauderdale – The Other Sessions (Dualtone)
- 2000: Randy Travis – Inspirational Journey (Word / Warner Bros. Nashville / Curb)
- 2000: Wylie and the Wild West – Ridin' the Hi-Line (Rounder)
- 2001: Gary Allan – Alright Guy (MCA Nashville)
- 2001: Rodney Crowell – The Houston Kid (Sugar Hill)
- 2001: Billy Gilman – Dare To Dream (Epic)
- 2001: Charlie Robison – Step Right Up (Columbia / Lucky Dog)
- 2002: Bonnie Bramlett – I'm Still the Same (Audium / Koch)
- 2002: Mark Chesnutt – Mark Chesnutt (Columbia)
- 2002: Andy Griggs – Freedom (RCA Nashville)
- 2002: Pam Tillis – It's All Relative: Tillis Sings Tillis (Epic / Lucky Dog)
- 2003: Dixie Chicks – Top of the World Tour: Live (Monument / Columbia)
- 2003: Gary Allan – See if I Care (MCA Nashville)
- 2003: Rodney Carrington – Nut Sack (Liberty)
- 2003: Keith Norris – Deuce (Tektonic)
- 2003: Marty Stuart – Country Music (Columbia)
- 2004: Travis Tritt – My Honky Tonk History (Columbia)
- 2005: Claudia Church – Claudia Church (Reprise)
- 2005: Shelby Lynne – Suit Yourself (Capitol)
- 2005: Willie Nelson – Countryman (Lost Highway)
- 2005: Joe Nichols – III (Universal South)
- 2005: Tanya Tucker – Live at Billy Bob's Texas (Smith Music Group)
- 2006: Shooter Jennings – Electric Rodeo (Universal)
- 2006: Jim Lauderdale – Country Super Hits, Vol. 1 (Yep Roc)
- 2006: Tony Joe White – Uncovered (Swamp)
- 2007: Gary Allan – Living Hard (MCA Nashville)
- 2007: Steve Forbert – Strange Names and New Sensations (429)
- 2008: Jamey Johnson – That Lonesome Song (Mercury)
- 2008: The Wrights – The Wrights (Mailboat)
- 2009: Among the Oak & Ash – Among the Oak & Ash (Verve Forecast)
- 2009: Steve Forbert – The Place and the Time (429)
- 2009: Zona Jones – Prove Me Right (Rocky Comfort)
- 2009: The Oak Ridge Boys – The Boys are Back (Spring Hill)

==== 2010–2019 ====
- 2010: Shooter Jennings – Black Ribbons (Black Country Rock)
- 2010: John Francis – The Better Angels (Dualtone)
- 2010: The Secret Sisters – The Secret Sisters (Universal Republic)
- 2010: Marty Stuart – Ghost Train: The Studio B Sessions (Sugar Hill)
- 2010: Jonalee White – Sugar (Lick)
- 2011: Nikki Lane – Walk of Shame (IAmSound)
- 2011: Jeffrey Steele – Hell on Wheels (3 Ring Circus)
- 2012: Billy Don Burns – Nights When I'm Sober: Portrait of a Honky Tonk Singer (Rusty Knuckles)
- 2012: Marty Stuart – Nashville, Vol. 1: Tear the Woodpile Down (Sugar Hill)
- 2013: Sturgill Simpson – High Top Mountain (High Top Mountain)
- 2014: Whiskey Myers – Early Morning Shakes (Wiggy Thump)
- 2015: Honeyhoney – 3 (Rounder)
- 2015: Chris Stapleton – Traveller (Mercury Nashville)
- 2015: Yelawolf – Love Story (Interscope)
- 2016: The Burns Sisters – In This World (Philo)
- 2016: Loretta Lynn – Full Circle (Legacy)
- 2017: Gin Blossoms – Congratulations I'm Sorry (A&M)
- 2017: Chris Stapleton – From A Room: Volume 1 (Mercury Nashville)
- 2017: Colter Wall – Colter Wall (Thirty Tigers)
