= American Remains =

1990 single by the Highwaymen

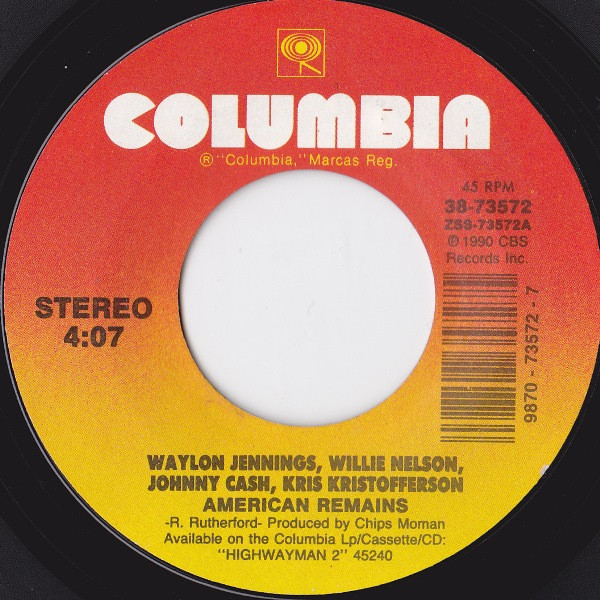
- 1990 single cover, b/w 'Texas'

Single by The Highwaymen

from the album Highwayman 2
- A-side: "Silver Stallion", "Texas"
- Released: 1990
- Genre: Country
- Length: 4:06
- Label: Columbia 38-73233, 38-73572
- Songwriter: R. Rutherford
- Producer: Chips Moman

Music video
- "American Remains" on YouTube

"American Remains" is a song written by Rivers Rutherford and originally recorded by the Highwaymen (Johnny Cash, Waylon Jennings, Kris Kristofferson, and Willie Nelson) for their 1990 album Highwayman 2. The song follows the stories of 4 historically fictional men (a shotgun rider for the fictional "San Jacinto Line", a card shark, a Midwest farmer, and a Cherokee American Indian) in a similar vein to their cover of "Highwayman". Unlike in Highwayman, however, none of the characters are implied dead; their legacies are instead emphasized.

The song was chosen as the fifth track of the album and as a flip side to the lead single from it ("Silver Stallion" / "American Remains", Columbia 38-73233). In October of the same year, it was again released as a single, this time coupled with "Texas".

== Track listing ==
7" single (Columbia 38-73233, January 1990)
No.	Title	Writer(s)	Length
1.	"Silver Stallion"	L. Clayton	3:12
2.	"American Remains"	R. Rutherford	4:06

7" single (Columbia 38-73572, October 1990)
No.	Title	Length
1.	"American Remains"	4:07
2.	"Texas"	2:42
