= Born and Raised in Black and White =

Song by The Highwaymen

Single by The Highwaymen

from the album Highwayman 2
- B-side: "Texas"
- Released: 1990
- Genre: Country
- Length: 3:32
- Label: Columbia 38-73381
- Songwriters: Don Cook; John Barlow Jarvis
- Producer: Chips Moman

The Highwaymen singles chronology
"Silver Stallion" (1990)	"Born and Raised in Black and White" (1990)	"American Remains" (1990)

Music video
- "Born and Raised in Black and White" on YouTube

"Born and Raised in Black and White" is a song written by Don Cook and John Barlow Jarvis, and originally recorded by The Highwaymen on their 1990 album Highwaymen 2. Mark Collie covered it for his 1991 album Born and Raised in Black & White, and Brooks & Dunn on their 1998 album If You See Her.

== The Highwaymen version ==
The song was recorded by The Highwaymen, a supergroup consisting of Johnny Cash, Waylon Jennings, Willie Nelson, and Kris Kristofferson. It served as the second track of their 1990 album Highwayman 2. For their rendition, Jennings sings lead vocals. At the time, Billboard had shortened the Hot Country Songs charts to 75 positions, and ran a secondary chart called Country Radio Breakouts, which consisted of the songs just below the top 75 for that week. "Born and Raised in Black and White" peaked at number one on this chart without ever entering Hot Country Songs.

== Content ==
The song is about a pair of brothers who live differing lives. One of the two is a convicted murderer, and the other becomes a preacher. Bob Allen of the Evening Sun called the song a "dramatic stand-out of the sort that almost grabs listeners by the ears and lifts them up."

== Other versions ==
A year later, Mark Collie recorded it as the title track of his album Born & Raised in Black & White. Brooks & Dunn also cut it on their 1998 album If You See Her. Their rendition was the first time in their career that both halves of the duo (Kix Brooks and Ronnie Dunn) sang lead on the same song, as opposed to just one of the two doing so.
