= I Do Believe (The Highwaymen song) =

Song by The Highwaymen

from the album The Road Goes on Forever
- Released: April 4, 1995
- Genre: Country
- Length: 3:25
- Label: Liberty/Capitol/EMI
- Songwriter(s): Waylon Jennings
- Producer(s): Don Was

"I Do Believe" is a song recorded by the American country supergroup The Highwaymen for their 1995 album The Road Goes on Forever. It was written by Waylon Jennings and produced by Don Was, with Jennings providing lead vocals on the track.

== Background and composition ==
"I think the best song I've ever written is 'I Do Believe.' It's off of one of the Highwaymen albums. It wasn't a hit, but it's a good song. Most people who have heard it feel the same way. It's about what a lot of people in this world are turning to now in the name of religion. But I think spirituality is where it's at. It's how you feel yourself. It's how I felt and the way I still feel about things."

— Waylon Jennings

The song has highly pandeistic-sounding overtones, as it derides conventional religious belief in Heaven and Hell while affirming a religious belief under which one ought to "live life to the fullest." In his autobiography, Jennings related of I Do Believe that, "when I finished the song, and before the Highwaymen recorded it, I showed it to Will"—that being 'bootleg preacher' Will D. Campbell—who simply responded, 'That'll preach.'"

== Release ==
The song was originally released on The Highwaymen album The Road Goes on Forever (1995), and was later included as the last song on Jennings' Nashville Rebel box set. It also appeared on the Red Hot and Country video. It was covered by Bonnie Bramlett on her 2008 album, Beautiful.

== Reception ==
The song wasn't a commercial hit, however, it is considered one of Jennings' finest compositions. Musicologist Colin Larkin, in his Encyclopedia of Popular Music, described the song as "thought-provoking" and wrote with respect to Jennings that the song "showed him at his best, questioning religious beliefs."

== Personnel ==
The Highwaymen

- Johnny Cash
- Waylon Jennings – lead vocals
- Kris Kristofferson
- Willie Nelson

Technical personnel

- Don Was – production
