= Sweet Mother Texas =

Studio album by Waylon Jennings
- Released: February 1986
- Studios: Cartee 3, Nashville; Scottsdale, Arizona
- Genres: Country; outlaw country
- Length: 28:51
- Label: RCA Victor
- Producers: Waylon Jennings; Richie Albright; Jerry Bridges; Gary Scruggs

Waylon Jennings chronology
Turn the Page (1985)	Sweet Mother Texas (1986)	Will the Wolf Survive (1986)

Sweet Mother Texas is a studio album by American country music artist Waylon Jennings, released on RCA Records in 1986. "Hanging On" was written by Tony Joe White.

The album contains outtakes from Jennings' recent albums, such as a cover of Bruce Springsteen's "I'm on Fire" and a version of Kris Kristofferson's "Living Legend", which would be recorded by the Highwaymen in 1990, on Highwayman 2. "Looking for Suzanne" had been previously released on Waylon's Greatest Hits, Vol. 2. It was his final studio album for RCA Records.

== Critical reception ==
Professional ratings
Review scores
Source	Rating
The Philadelphia Inquirer	2/4 stars

The Philadelphia Inquirer wrote that "Jennings sounds bored, confused, vague." The Toronto Star noted that "Jennings, like Johnny Cash before him, is in a period of his career that finds him groping for identity." The Atlanta Journal-Constitution concluded that Jennings "seldom seems to be operating at more than 80 percent of his potential." The Houston Chronicle called the album "his most evocative and dirt-country release in years."

== Track listing ==
1. "I'm on Fire" (Bruce Springsteen) – 2:35
2. "Me and Them Brothers of Mine" (Tommy L. Jennings) - 3:06
3. "I Take My Comfort in You" (Wayland Holyfield, Guy Clark) - 3:28
4. "Looking for Suzanne" (Paul Kennerley) - 3:39
5. "Be Careful Who You Love (Arthur's Song)" (Harlan Howard) – 4:33
  - With Johnny Cash
6. "Sweet Mother Texas" (Sanger D. Shafer, Eddy Raven) - 2:53
7. "Living Legend" (Kris Kristofferson) - 4:45
8. "Hanging On" (Tony Joe White) - 3:51

== Personnel ==
- Pickers: Waylon Jennings, Ralph Mooney, Jerry Bridges, Gary Scruggs, Jim Haber, Dan Mustoe, Tony Joe White, Earl Scruggs, Randy Scruggs, Richie Albright, Sonny Curtis, Harrison Calloway, Gordon Payne
- Singers: Waylon Jennings, Johnny Cash, Patti Leatherwood, Carter Robertson, Barny Robertson
- Producer: Jerry Bridges, Gary Scruggs, Richie Albright, Waylon Jennings
- Art Direction: Bill Barnes
- Cover Photography: Bill Mitchell
