= WWII (album) =

1982 album by Waylon Jennings & Willie Nelson

Studio album by Waylon Jennings and Willie Nelson
- Released: October 1982
- Recorded: 1981
- Studio: Moman's Studio
- Genres: Country; outlaw country
- Length: 34:42
- Label: RCA Victor
- Producers: Waylon Jennings; Chips Moman

Waylon Jennings & Willie Nelson chronology
Waylon & Willie (1978)	WWII (1982)	Take It to the Limit (1983)

Waylon Jennings chronology
Black on Black (1982)	WWII (1982)	It's Only Rock & Roll (1983)

Willie Nelson chronology
Always on My Mind (1982)	WWII (1982)	Tougher Than Leather (1983)

WWII is the second collaborative studio album by Waylon Jennings and Willie Nelson, released on RCA Victor in 1982.

== Reception ==
Professional ratings
Review scores
Source	Rating
AllMusic	2/5 stars
The Rolling Stone Album Guide	2.5/5 stars

WWII failed to have as major an impact as Waylon & Willie, although it peaked at #3 on the Billboard country albums chart and #57 on the pop albums chart.

== Track listing ==
1. "Mr. Shuck and Jive" (Jimmy Webb) (Art Garfunkel cover) – 3:49
  - Duet
2. "Roman Candles" (Jennings, Michael Smotherman) – 3:04
3. "(Sittin' on) the Dock of the Bay" (Steve Cropper, Otis Redding) (Otis Redding cover) – 3:22
  - Duet
4. "The Year That Clayton Delaney Died" (Tom T. Hall) (Tom T. Hall cover) – 3:06
  - Duet
5. "Lady in the Harbor" (Jerry Allison, Sonny Curtis, Doug Gilmore) – 3:18
6. "May I Borrow Some Sugar from You" (Bobby Emmons, Chips Moman) – 3:24
7. "The Last Cowboy Song" (Ed Bruce, Ron Peterson) (Ed Bruce cover) – 2:18
8. "Heroes" (Bobby Emmons, Chips Moman) – 2:46
  - Duet
9. "The Teddy Bear Song" (Don Earl, Nick Nixon) (Barbara Fairchild cover) – 3:11
10. "Write Your Own Songs" (Nelson) – 3:14
  - Duet
11. "The Old Mother's Locket Trick" (Guy Clark) (Harold Lee cover) – 3:10

== Chart performance ==
Chart (1982)	Peak position
U.S. Billboard Top Country Albums	3
U.S. Billboard 200	57
Australia Kent Music Report	92

== Certifications ==
Region	Certification	Certified units/sales
United States (RIAA)	Gold	500,000^{^}
^{^} Shipments figures based on certification alone.

== Personnel ==
- Waylon Jennings - guitar, vocals
- J.I. Allison - drums
- Gene Chrisman - drums, percussion
- Chips Moman - guitar
- Reggie Young - guitar
- Willie Nelson - guitar, vocals
- Bobby Emmons - keyboards
- Johnny Christopher - guitar, backing vocals
- Bobby Wood - piano
- Toni White - backing vocals
- Mike Leech - bass
- Jerry Bridges - bass
