= They Killed Him =

Single by Kris Kristofferson

from the album Repossessed
- B-side: "Anthem '84"
- Released: 1986
- Genre: Country rock
- Length: 3:23
- Label: Mercury
- Songwriter: Kris Kristofferson
- Producer: Chips Moman

Kris Kristofferson singles chronology
"How Do You Feel About Foolin' Around" (1984)	"They Killed Him" (1986)	"Love Is the Way" (1987)

"They Killed Him" is a song written by Kris Kristofferson for his October 1986 album Repossessed.

It is a tribute to his martyred personal heroes: Martin Luther King Jr., Mahatma Gandhi, Jesus Christ, John F. Kennedy and Robert F. Kennedy. Prior to Kristofferson recording the song himself, Johnny Cash recorded it in 1984 as one of his final singles for Columbia Records. The song was covered by Bob Dylan for his album Knocked Out Loaded, released in July 1986.

== Chart performance ==
Chart (1986–1987)	Peak position
U.S. Billboard Hot Country Singles	67
Canadian RPM Country Tracks	53

== See also ==
- List of artistic depictions of Mahatma Gandhi
