= Cowboys, Sisters, Rascals & Dirt =

Studio album by Waylon Jennings
- Released: June 1993
- Genre: Country; outlaw country
- Length: 31:53
- Label: Ode 2 Kids; BMG
- Producer: Cliff "Barny" Robertson

Waylon Jennings chronology
Ol' Waylon Sings Ol' Hank (1992)	Cowboys, Sisters, Rascals & Dirt (1993)	Waymore's Blues (Part II) (1994)

Professional ratings
Review scores
Source	Rating
AllMusic	3.5/5 stars

Cowboys, Sisters, Rascals & Dirt is the forty-first studio album by American country music artist Waylon Jennings, released in 1993 through the labels BMG and Ode 2 Kids. A concept album, it features Jennings singing compositions intended for children. All of the tracks on the record were written by the singer himself. The final song is dedicated to Jennings' son, Shooter. While a music video for "Cowboy Movies" was filmed, the album itself did not chart. The album was recorded by Rodney Good and produced by Cliff "Barny" Robertson, whose daughters, Becky, Emily and Joanna, sing backing vocals on it. In the mid-2000s, the daughters founded a group called Carter's Chord.

== Track listing ==
All tracks written by Waylon Jennings except where noted.

1. "I'm Little" – 2:57
2. "I Just Can't Wait" – 2:34
3. "When I Get Big" – 2:11
4. "All of My Sisters Are Girls" – 2:59
5. "A Bad Day" – 3:09
6. "Dirt" – 2:36
7. "Cowboy Movies" – 3:01
8. "If I Could Only Fly" – 2:34
9. "Useless (The Little Horse That Didn't Grow)" (Waylon Jennings, Shooter Jennings) – 5:23
10. "Small Packages" – 2:14
11. "Shooter's Theme" – 2:15

== Personnel ==
- Jerry Bridges - bass
- Kellie Cunningham - background vocals
- Sonny Curtis - acoustic guitar
- Glen Duncan - fiddle
- Jeff Hale - drums
- Cristana Lund - background vocals
- Brant Mackey - background vocals
- Terry McMillan - harmonica, percussion
- Barny Robertson - keyboards
- Emily Robertson - background vocals
- Joanna Robertson - background vocals
- Joseph Sarles - background vocals
- Caroll Spinney - Oscar The Grouch
- Robby Turner - steel guitar, mandolin, banjo, dobro
- Waylon Jennings - vocals, electric guitar
