= Desperados Waiting for a Train =

1973 song written by Guy Clark

Single by The Highwaymen

from the album Highwayman
- B-side: "The Twentieth Century Is Almost Over"
- Released: September 14, 1985
- Genre: Country
- Length: 4:38
- Label: Columbia
- Songwriter: Guy Clark
- Producer: Chips Moman

The Highwaymen singles chronology
"Highwayman"	"Desperados Waiting for a Train" (1985)	"Silver Stallion" (1990)

"Desperados Waiting for a Train" is a song written by Guy Clark and originally recorded by Jerry Jeff Walker for his 1973 album Viva Terlingua. It subsequently appeared on Rita Coolidge's 1974 album Fall into Spring, David Allan Coe's third album, The Mysterious Rhinestone Cowboy (1974), Tom Rush's album Ladies Love Outlaws the same year, before Clark's own rendition was released on his first LP, 1975's Old No. 1. Clark stated that the song is about his grandmother's boyfriend named Jack who was a grandfather figure to him.

The American country music group the Highwaymen released it as a single in September 1985. It was the second single from the album Highwayman. The song reached #15 on the Billboard Hot Country Singles & Tracks chart.

Nanci Griffith recorded it for her 1998 album Other Voices Too (A Trip Back to Bountiful), accompanied by Clark, Rodney Crowell, Ron De La Vega, Steve Earle, Jimmie Dale Gilmore, James Hooker, Doug Lancio, Pat McInerney, Eric Taylor, Richard Thompson and Jerry Jeff Walker.

Jason Isbell covered the song for Guy Clark's induction into the 2015 Austin City Limits hall of fame ceremony.

Members of the Western Writers of America chose it as one of the Top 100 Western songs of all time.

== Chart performance ==
Chart (1985)	Peak position
US Hot Country Songs (Billboard)	15
Canadian RPM Country Tracks	20
