= Repossessed (album) =

Studio album by Kris Kristofferson
- Released: October 1986
- Genre: Country rock, alternative country
- Length: 33:50
- Label: Mercury
- Producer: Chips Moman

Kris Kristofferson chronology
Music from Songwriter (1984)	Repossessed (1986)	Third World Warrior (1990)

Professional ratings
Review scores
Source	Rating
AllMusic	2.5/5 stars

Repossessed is an album by Kris Kristofferson, released on Mercury Records in 1986 (see 1986 in music). It was Kristofferson's first full-length solo album since 1981's To the Bone, although the singer did collaborate with other artists in the meantime, most notably on Highwayman with Johnny Cash, Waylon Jennings and Willie Nelson.

== Background ==
Kristofferson's career hit a wall at the start of the 1980s. In the second half of the previous decade, his recording career had been on a steady downward slope, and the release of the film Heaven's Gate in 1980 torpedoed his film career. His turbulent marriage to singer Rita Coolidge came to an end in December 1979, and his record label for ten years, Monument, went under. Kristofferson decided to take a sabbatical from his solo career and became much more politically active. He also contributed to three albums recorded with others: Kris, Willie, Dolly & Brenda ... The Winning Hand (1982) (with Willie Nelson, Dolly Parton, and Brenda Lee); the soundtrack Music From Songwriter (1984) (with Nelson), which contained four Kristofferson solo tracks; and Highwayman (with Nelson, Johnny Cash, and Waylon Jennings). The last was a major success, topping the country charts, and probably interested Mercury Records in giving Kristofferson a new contract as a solo artist.

== Recording and composition ==
Chips Moman, who had produced the first Highwaymen LP and recorded the likes of Elvis Presley, Aretha Franklin, and Bobby Womack, was brought in to produce Kristofferson's debut on Mercury. Moman scored a massive hit with Willie Nelson's 1982 album Always on My Mind, and had topped the country album charts a year later with Pancho & Lefty, Nelson's duet album with Merle Haggard. After a string of commercial misfires in the second half of the Seventies, it was hoped that Moman's magic might revive Kristofferson's stalled recording career. Although the music had a loose, languid feel despite some synthesized sounds and superfluous echo on the vocals, performed by Kristofferson's backing group The Borderlords, it resembled a live recording without an audience – particularly when Kristofferson called out intros and lead breaks as he would in concert.

The songs on Repossessed were heavily informed by Kristofferson's political activism. In the early 1980s his political activities – which also included appearing in concert for UNICEF and stridently protesting U.S. policy in Central America – overshadowed his music, like at the 1981 Grammy Awards show press conference, when the former army captain, without so much as a cue or a provocation, issued his first loud condemnation of U.S. involvement in Central America by blurting out "Let's get the hell out of El Salvador," as the paparazzi and fellow actors looked on. It is unsurprising, then, that such geopolitical concerns would find their way into his songwriting, with Streissguth noting:

In 1986, his album Repossessed, his first for Mercury Records, took aim at the sitting president as well as his policies on El Salvador. And then he targeted the U.S. government's support of the Contra rebels in Nicaragua…At home, he rarely did an interview or concert pass without speaking out on the issue. "We have a sorry history in Nicaragua," he told a reporter...I can't believe that most Americans would be comfortable knowing they're paying to kill children."

"What About Me" makes direct reference to the civil war in El Salvador; fearing another Vietnam, Kristofferson's anger was directed at President Reagan, who was providing support for that country's military in their efforts to defeat the left-wing rebels. "Shipwrecked in the Eighties" became Kristofferson's show opener and was partly inspired by a chance meeting with a Vietnam vet, although it also reflected the mess the singer's career had been reduced to in the early years of the decade. Another song with a humanitarian bent, "They Killed Him," came to Kristofferson after seeing the film Gandhi and becoming "depressed by the murdering of all the visionaries…whoever was promoting peace seemed to get killed." Johnny Cash had recorded the song for a non-charting single in 1984 and Bob Dylan was so impressed by the tune that he recorded it for his Knocked Out Loaded album. (The Highwaymen would also cover "Anthem '84" on Highwaymen 2.) Repossessed contains some sentimental moments, such as "The Heart," a song of praise and affection for Kristofferson's father that was covered by Lacy J. Dalton on the album Survivor in 1987, and the closing track, "Love Is the Way," a paean for peace that was accompanied by a mawkish music video with picturesque landscapes and waterfalls, two newborn babies (one black, one white), toddlers, and puppies. "Love Is The Way" was covered by Johnny Cash and Waylon Jennings in 1986 on the album Heroes. "Mean Old Man" features rock and roll legend Carl Perkins on guitar, and the song would serve as the title track for Jerry Lee Lewis's 2009 release. "This Old Road" was re-recorded for Kristofferson's 2006 release of the same name.

"El Gavilan (The Hawk)" was covered by Marianne Faithfull in the 1985 movie Trouble in Mind.

== Reception ==
Considering the provocative nature of some of the songs, Repossessed was not a commercial success, reaching number 31 on the country albums chart, although it lingered in the charts for several months. AllMusic's William Ruhlmann writes "there were no real insights to be found in the songwriter's sketchy and abstract descriptions either in these songs or the more philosophical statements…it was not one of his better records."

== Track listing ==
All tracks written by Kris Kristofferson.

1. "Mean Old Man" – 3:08
2. "Shipwrecked in the Eighties" – 4:24
3. "They Killed Him" – 3:23
4. "What About Me" – 3:41
5. "El Gavilan (The Hawk)" – 3:54
6. "El Coyote" – 2:37
7. "Anthem '84" – 3:09
8. "The Heart" – 2:52
9. "This Old Road" – 3:42
10. "Love is the Way" – 3:00

== Personnel ==
- Kris Kristofferson – guitar, vocals
- Terry McMillan – harmonica

The Borderlords

- Billy Swan, Stephen Bruton – guitar, vocals
- Glen Clark – guitar, keyboards, harmonica, vocals
- Tommy McClure – bass
- Donnie Fritts – keyboards, vocals
- Sammy Creason – drums

== Charts ==
Chart performance for Repossessed
Chart (1986)	Peak position
US Top Country Albums (Billboard)	31
