= Take It to the Limit (Willie Nelson and Waylon Jennings album) =

Studio album by Willie Nelson with Waylon Jennings
- Released: April 1983
- Genres: Country; outlaw country
- Length: 33:44
- Label: Columbia
- Producer: Chips Moman

Waylon Jennings & Willie Nelson chronology
WWII (1982)	Take It to the Limit (1983)	Clean Shirt (1991)

Waylon Jennings chronology
It's Only Rock & Roll (1983)	Take It to the Limit (1983)	Waylon and Company (1983)

Willie Nelson chronology
Always on My Mind (1982)	Take It to the Limit (1983)	Tougher Than Leather (1983)

Singles from Take It to the Limit
- 1. "Why Do I Have to Choose" Released: May 1983

Take It to the Limit is the third collaborative studio album by Willie Nelson and Waylon Jennings, released in 1983 on Columbia Records.

== Background ==
Take It to the Limit was the third Jennings/Nelson duet album and the second to be produced by Chips Moman. Whereas their previous album together, 1982's WWII, had contained more Waylon solo tracks, this LP includes five tracks sung solely by Willie. The title actually reads Wille Nelson with Waylon Jennings, likely the result of the LP being released on Nelson's label CBS (the previous two duet albums had been released on RCA). The title song was written by Eagles' members Randy Meisner, Don Henley and Glenn Frey and performed by the Eagles on their 1975 album, One of These Nights, while "Homeward Bound" was originally by Simon & Garfunkel. Take It to the Limit was the next-to-last collaboration between Jennings and Nelson; of the four duets albums released by the singers, 1978's Waylon & Willie achieved the greatest success. Despite the fact that neither singer was in top artistic form and Jennings' most successful days were already over, the record managed to chart, peaking at #3, as did WWII. "Why Do I Have to Choose" also reached #3, while the title track reached #8 on the singles chart.

== Reception ==
Professional ratings
Review scores
Source	Rating
AllMusic	1/5 stars

In his review of the album for AllMusic, James Chrispell writes, "it sounds like these two hombres are just plain tired and saddle-sore from all the high riding days of the past. Most of the tunes are covers of previous hits by other artists and have little in association with what Willie (or Waylon) are about except for their take on George Jones' "Why Baby Why." By this time, fans were beginning to say the same thing." Author Joe Nick Paroski stated in his 2008 book Willie Nelson that the LP "reflected a growing distance. The effort sounded half-hearted, as if they were recording together only because it made good business, and it clocked in at a mere thirty-four minutes."

== Track listing ==
1. "No Love at All" (Johnny Christopher, Wayne Carson Thompson) – 2:42
2. "Why Do I Have to Choose" (Willie Nelson) – 3:12
3. "Why Baby Why" (Darrell Edwards, George Jones) – 2:40
4. "We Had It All" (Donnie Fritts, Troy Seals) – 3:06
5. "Take It to the Limit" (Randy Meisner, Glenn Frey, Don Henley) – 3:46
6. "Homeward Bound" (Paul Simon) – 3:29
7. "Blackjack County Chain" (Red Lane) – 2:59
8. "'Til I Gain Control Again" (Rodney Crowell) – 4:57
9. "Old Friends" (Roger Miller) – 3:33
10. "Would You Lay with Me (In a Field of Stone)" (David Allan Coe) – 3:16

== Production ==
- Producer: Chips Moman
- Art Direction: Virginia Team
- Cover Illustration Bill Imhoff
- Photo of Willie: Charlyn Zlotnick
- Photo of Waylon: Beverly Parker

== Personnel ==
- Willie Nelson - lead and harmony vocals, guitar
- Waylon Jennings – lead and harmony vocals, guitar
- Chips Moman – harmony vocals, guitar, producer
- Johnny Christopher – harmony vocals, guitar
- Reggie Young, Grady Martin - guitar
- Mike Leach, Bee Spears - bass guitar
- Bobbie Nelson – keyboards
- Bobby Wood - harmony vocals, keyboards
- Gene Christman, Paul English - drums
- Jon Marett - saxophone
- Toni Wine, Lisa Silver, Harry Huffman, David Allan Coe, Garry Talley - harmony vocals

== Chart performance ==
Chart (1983)	Peak position
U.S. Billboard 200	60
U.S. Billboard Top Country Albums	3
