= Why Do I Have to Choose =

Single by Willie Nelson

from the album Take It to the Limit
- B-side: "Would You Lay with Me (In a Field of Stone)"
- Released: May 1983
- Genre: Country
- Length: 3:12
- Label: Columbia
- Songwriter(s): Willie Nelson
- Producer(s): Chips Moman

Willie Nelson singles chronology
"Little Old Fashioned Karma" (1983)	"Why Do I Have to Choose" (1983)	"Take It to the Limit" (1983)

"Why Do I Have to Choose" is a song written and recorded by American country music artist Willie Nelson. It was released in May 1983 as the first single from his album Take It to the Limit. The song reached number 3 on the Billboard Hot Country Singles chart and number 1 on the RPM Country Tracks chart in Canada.

== Charts ==
=== Weekly charts ===
Chart (1983)	Peak position
US Hot Country Songs (Billboard)	3
Canadian RPM Country Tracks	1

=== Year-end charts ===
Chart (1983)	Position
US Hot Country Songs (Billboard)	37
