= Waymore's Blues (Part II) =

Studio album by Waylon Jennings
- Released: September 13, 1994
- Recorded: Spring 1994
- Studio: Ocean Way Recording
- Genres: Country; Outlaw country
- Length: 39:26
- Label: RCA
- Producer: Don Was

Waylon Jennings chronology
| Cowboys, Sisters, Rascals & Dirt (1993) | Waymore's Blues (Part II) (1994) | The Road Goes on Forever (1995) |

Alternative cover

Professional ratings
Review scores
| Source | Rating |
|---|---|
| AllMusic | 3/5 stars |

Waymore's Blues (Part II) is the forty-second studio album by American country music artist Waylon Jennings, released by RCA Records on September 13, 1994.

== Background ==
It was recorded and released at a time in Jennings' career when he wasn't signed to any major label; Waymore's Blues (Part II) was a one-off return to RCA for the singer following short stints at MCA Records and Epic Records. It was produced by Don Was, who would lend his distinctive style of production to The Highwaymen's The Road Goes on Forever a year later. Jennings later stated, "We clicked from the start of the first take, which was the title cut," and instructed the musicians "to forget about everything they had ever heard me do." He later recalled:

For his part, Don was looking at what he called my essence; he wanted to create an instrumental texture, a pad of colors, rather than having the usual trading of licks. He didn't want to lose me in a sea of arrangement. He called it impressionistic, like a painting, and when we heard "Waymore's Blues Part II" come over the speakers, I understood what he was getting at...And I was proud of that album, because it felt like I was back in command of myself, sure of my creativity, knowing I was reaching for something I hadn't done before, and finding it.

In his 1996 memoir Waylon, Jennings reflected on several of the cuts:

- Old Timer: "'Old Timer' was very dear to my heart, a poignant tale about an old mountain man from Jackson Hole, Wyoming, who loved a woman from St. Paul. She came to visit her brother, and they met each other in the wilds. He could never tell her he loved her..."
- Wild Ones: "There were things like 'Wild Ones,' where I remembered the times when me, Willie, and Jessi had come to town and how we had shaken up Nashville's hierarchy up in our fight to keep the music honest."
- Endangered Species: "There were more like me at one time, the song was saying, and though 'a man in love is what you want to be,' it was also talking about the way you carry yourself, and how where once the song and the performance of the song was the thing, now videos have shifted the emphasis and fantasy away from the hearing..."
- Waymore's Blues Part II: "I was still saying things that every macho you-don't-mess-around-with-me guy might say, but I probably didn't feel the need to live up to them much now."

"You Don't Mess Around with Me" was used in the soundtrack to the movie Maverick, which also featured Jennings on "Amazing Grace". Waymore's Blues (Part II), whose title is a reference to an earlier, popular Jennings composition, reached #63 on the country charts, with no charting singles. The song "Wild Ones" was done as a music video in 1994.

Members of the Western Writers of America chose "The Old Timer" as one of the Top 100 Western songs of all time.

"Whatever Happened to the Blues," an outtake from these sessions co-written by Jennings and pal Tony Joe White, belatedly served as the finale of the RCA compilation The Essential Waylon Jennings in 1996.

== Track listing ==
All songs written by Waylon Jennings except as noted.

1. "Endangered Species" (Jennings, Tony Joe White) – 3:12
2. "Waymore's Blues (Part II)" – 4:18
3. "This Train (Russell's Song)" – 3:34
4. "Wild Ones" – 3:38
5. "No Good for Me" – 3:22
6. "Old Timer (The Song)" – 5:32
7. "Up in Arkansas" (White, Ricky Ray Rector) – 4:06
8. "Nobody Knows" – 3:00
9. "Come Back and See Me" – 4:16
10. "You Don't Mess Around with Me" – 4:28

== Personnel ==
- Kenny Aronoff – drums
- Mark Goldenberg – accordion, guitar
- Benmont Tench – organ
- Robby Turner – pedal steel guitar, resonator guitar
- Don Was – bass
- Tony Joe White – guitar, harmonica
- Waylon Jennings – vocals, guitar

== Chart performance ==
| Chart (1994) | Peak position |
|---|---|
| U.S. Billboard Top Country Albums | 63 |

== Bibliography ==
- Jennings, Waylon; Kaye, Lenny (1996). Waylon: An Autobiography. Warner Brooks. ISBN 978-0-446-51865-9.
