= Waylon and Company =

Studio album by Waylon Jennings
- Released: September 1983
- Genres: Country; outlaw country
- Length: 32:02
- Label: RCA Victor
- Producer: Waylon Jennings

Waylon Jennings chronology
Take It to the Limit (1983)	Waylon and Company (1983)	Never Could Toe the Mark (1984)

Singles from Waylon and Company
- 1. "Hold On! I'm Comin'" Released: July 25, 1983; 2. "The Conversation" Released: October 22, 1983; 3. "I May Be Used (But Baby I Ain't Used Up)" Released: March 3, 1984

Professional ratings
Review scores
Source	Rating
Allmusic	2/5 stars

Waylon and Company is the thirtieth studio album by American country music artist Waylon Jennings, released on RCA Records in 1983.

== Track listing ==
1. "Hold On! I'm Comin'" (David Porter, Isaac Hayes) – 2:33
  - With Jerry Reed
2. "Leave Them Boys Alone" (Dean Dillon, Hank Williams Jr., Gary Stewart, Tanya Tucker) – 3:32
  - With Hank Williams, Jr. and Ernest Tubb
3. "Spanish Johnny" (Paul Siebel, David Bromberg) – 3:51
  - With Emmylou Harris
4. "Just to Satisfy You" (Jennings, Don Bowman) – 2:49
  - With Willie Nelson
5. "So You Want to Be a Cowboy Singer" (Tony Joe White, Jennings) – 2:59
  - With Tony Joe White
6. "I May Be Used (But Baby I Ain't Used Up)" (Bob McDill) – 2:58
7. "Sight for Sore Eyes" (Danny Morrison, Chester Lester) – 3:47
  - With Jessi Colter
8. "I'll Find It Where I Can" (Michael B. Clark, Zak Van Arsdale) – 2:58
  - With James Garner
9. "The Conversation" (Hank Williams, Jr., Jennings, Richie Albright) – 3:51
  - With Hank Williams, Jr.
10. "Mason Dixon Lines" (Dan Mitchell) – 2:44
  - With Mel Tillis

== Chart performance ==
Chart (1983)	Peak position
U.S. Billboard Top Country Albums	12
