= Highwayman 2 =

1990 studio album by the Highwaymen

Studio album by The Highwaymen
- Released: February 27, 1990
- Recorded: March 6–9, 1989
- Genre: Country
- Length: 32:48
- Label: Columbia Nashville
- Producer: Chips Moman

The Highwaymen chronology
Highwayman (1985)	Highwayman 2 (1990)	The Road Goes on Forever (1995)

Johnny Cash chronology
Boom Chicka Boom (1990)	Highwayman 2 (1990)	The Man in Black 1954-1958 (1990)

Singles from Highwayman 2
- 1. "Silver Stallion" / "American Remains" Released: January 1990; 2. "Born and Raised in Black and White" Released: May 1990; 3. "American Remains" Released: September 1990

Professional ratings
Review scores
Source	Rating
Allmusic	2.5/5 stars

Highwayman 2 is the second studio album released by American country supergroup the Highwaymen. This album was released in 1990 on the Columbia Records label. Johnny Cash had left Columbia several years earlier, making this a "homecoming", and ultimately his final work for Columbia as the next Highwaymen album would be issued on another label.

== Recording and tour ==
Chips Moman again resumed production duties for the second Highwaymen album. Moman, who had enjoyed tremendous success recording Nelson throughout the eighties, gave the album a contemporary sound for the time, although it may not have aged well; AllMusic contends the album "suffers from an overall homogenous and dated 1980s studio sound." Kristofferson biographer Stephen Miller notes, "Moman produced in such a fashion – prominent drums, electric guitars, and organs – as to bring rock values to songs that, with a different approach, could just as easily have been pure country."

The Highwaymen tour to promote the album was a success, playing to over 55,000 fans at the opening gig at the Houston Livestock Show and Rodeo, and the rest of the tour attracted near sell-out audiences despite Cash suffering from a broken jaw. There were rumours of clashing egos and flare-ups, in part fuelled by Kristofferson's penchant for sounding off on his political views and opposition to American foreign policy. While Kristofferson was honoured to be among the Highwaymen's ranks, he didn't shy away from expressing his political views on occasion – even though this risked displeasing the audience, not to mention members of the band and crew who reputedly held up signs saying, “That doesn’t go for me.” It rankled Jennings in particular, who revealed in the A&E's Kristofferson episode of Biography, “We came very close a couple of time to punching it out. I didn’t say he was all wrong, the main thing I was sayin’ was he shouldn't’ve been doin’ it onstage, especially with three other people on there who didn't share all of his thoughts.” In his 2015 autobiography My Life, Nelson dismisses the idea of rancor, writing “Rumors spread that Waylon, Johnny, Kris, and I were having ego problems and fighting like cats an dogs. The rumours were bullshit. We saw it as one nonstop transcontinental party…I don’t mean that we didn’t get a little cranky from time to time…For the most part, though, it was smooth sailing.”

== Reception ==
Highwayman 2 spent 40 weeks on the country chart, peaking at number 4. AllMusic: "Country music's version of the Traveling Wilburys, the Highwaymen's second album clocks in at just under a mere 33 minutes and covers little new territory for the group of country legends. Sadly, of the ten tracks, only six were penned by any of the members…Overall, Highwayman 2 features a decent set of rather uneventful songs, but only the most dedicated fan will find this album a necessity."

== Track listing ==
No.	Title	Writer(s)	Length
1.	"Silver Stallion"	Lee Clayton	3:12
2.	"Born and Raised in Black and White"	Don Cook, John Barlow Jarvis	4:01
3.	"Two Stories Wide"	Willie Nelson	2:35
4.	"We're All in Your Corner"	Bobby Emmons, Troy Seals	3:04
5.	"American Remains"	Rivers Rutherford	4:07
6.	"Anthem '84"	Kris Kristofferson	2:43
7.	"Angels Love Bad Men"	Waylon Jennings, Roger Murrah	3:33
8.	"Songs That Make a Difference"	Johnny Cash	2:55
9.	"Living Legend"	Kristofferson	3:59
10.	"Texas"	Nelson	2:39

== Personnel ==
The Highwaymen

- Willie Nelson - vocals, guitar
- Johnny Cash - vocals
- Waylon Jennings - vocals
- Kris Kristofferson - vocals

Additional musicians

- Reggie Young - guitar
- Johnny Christopher - guitar
- Chips Moman - guitar
- Shawn Lane - guitar
- Mike Leech - bass
- Bobby Wood - keyboards
- Bobby Emmons - keyboards
- Gene Chrisman - drums
- Mickey Raphael - harmonica
- Robby Turner - steel guitar

=== Additional personnel ===
- Produced by: Chips Moman
- Recorded at Emerald Sound Studio, Nashville, TN, Three Alarm Recording Studio, Memphis, TN, and Pedernales Recording Studio, Speicewood, TX
- Mixed at 3-Alarms Recording Studio, Memphis, TN
- Engineers: Chips Moman and David Cherry
- Assistant Engineers: David Parker, Larry Greenhill, Howard Irving, Skip McQuinn, David Edney, and Eric Paul
- Additional Overdubs: Bobby Emmons, Chips Moman, Rivers Rutherford, Robbie Turner, Jack Powell, David Edney and Johnny Barringer
- Mastered by: Denny Purcell of Georgetown Masters, Nashville, TN
- Art Direction by: Bill Johnson and Rollow Welch
- Photography by: Jim McGuire

== Charts ==
=== Weekly charts ===
Chart (1990–1991)	Peak position
Australian Albums (ARIA)	9
US Billboard 200	79
US Top Country Albums (Billboard)	4

=== Year-end charts ===
Chart (1990)	Position
US Top Country Albums (Billboard)	26

== Certifications ==
Region	Certification	Certified units/sales
Australia (ARIA)	Platinum	70,000^{^}
^{^} Shipments figures based on certification alone.
