= Music from Songwriter =

Soundtrack album by Kris Kristofferson and Willie Nelson
- Released: October 1984
- Studio: Pedernales Recording (Spicewood, Texas); Ocean Way (Hollywood, California)
- Genre: Country
- Length: 39:45
- Label: Columbia
- Producer: Booker T. Jones

Kris Kristofferson and Willie Nelson chronology
| The Winning Hand (1982) | Music from Songwriter (1984) | Repossessed (1986) |

Professional ratings
Review scores
| Source | Rating |
|---|---|
| AllMusic | 4/5 stars |

Music from Songwriter is a soundtrack album by Kris Kristofferson and Willie Nelson, released on Columbia Records in 1984 (see 1984 in music). It is the soundtrack to Songwriter, a film starring the two performers. Two of the songs on the record are duets, five are sung by Nelson and four by Kristofferson. "How Do You Feel About Foolin' Around" was released as a single and reached the country charts, and the album itself was nominated for an Academy Award, losing to Purple Rain. The album has been released by Wounded Bird Records.

== Track listing ==
1. "How Do You Feel About Foolin' Around" (Kristofferson, Stephen Bruton, Mike Utley) – 2:43
2. "Songwriter" (Nelson) – 3:04
3. "Who'll Buy My Memories?" (Nelson) – 3:31
4. "Write Your Own Songs" (Nelson) – 3:16
5. "Nobody Said It Was Going to Be Easy" (Nelson, Mickey Raphael) – 2:28
6. "Good Times" (Nelson) – 3:37
7. "Eye of the Storm" (Kristofferson) – 3:13
8. "Crossing the Border" (Kristofferson) – 5:11
9. "Down to Her Socks" (Kristofferson) – 2:51
10. "Under the Gun" (Kristofferson, Glen Clark) – 6:18
11. "Final Attraction" (Kristofferson) – 3:33
- Tracks 1 & 7 are duets between Kristofferson and Nelson.
- Tracks 2–6 ("Doc's Side") are performances by Nelson.
- Tracks 8–11 ("Blackie's Side") are performances by Kristofferson.

== Personnel ==
Musicians

- Bee Spears, Billy Swan, Bobbie Nelson, Booker T. Jones, Craig Hull, Dan Lawson, Darrell Leonard, Donnie Fritts, Glen Clark, Grady Martin, Greg Smith, Jody Payne, Larry Gadler, Mickey Raphael, Paul English, Rex Ludwick, Sammy Creason, Stephen Bruton, Steve Appel, Tommy McClure

== Charts ==
Chart performance for Music from Songwriter
| Chart (1984) | Peak position |
|---|---|
| US Billboard 200 | 152 |
| US Top Country Albums (Billboard) | 21 |
