= I've Always Been Crazy =

Album by Waylon Jennings

Studio album by Waylon Jennings
- Released: July 1978
- Recorded: March 13–May 1978
- Genre: Outlaw country
- Length: 36:55
- Label: RCA Victor
- Producers: Waylon Jennings; Richie Albright; Duane Eddy ["Medley of Buddy Holly Hits"]

Waylon Jennings chronology
Waylon & Willie (1978)	I've Always Been Crazy (1978)	Greatest Hits (1979)

Singles from I've Always Been Crazy
- 1. "I've Always Been Crazy" Released: June 1978; 2. "Don't You Think This Outlaw Bit's Done Got Out of Hand" Released: October 1978

I've Always Been Crazy is the twenty-fifth studio album by American country music artist Waylon Jennings, released on RCA Victor in 1978.

== Background ==
By 1978, Jennings was getting burned out on the outlaw country movement. Despite enormous critical and commercial success, including a run of three #1 studio albums, a #1 live album, a #1 duet album (with Willie Nelson), and ten Top 10 solo singles (including five chart toppers), he was irritated at the hype surrounding his music and resented how Nashville had co-opted what had started out as a musical rebellion against Music Row in the name of artistic freedom. Far more concerning, however, was Jennings' spiral into cocaine addiction. By his own admission, his appetite for the drug was monstrous:

I wasn't just doing a little drugs. I was doing them constantly...I'd do them until I collapsed, then I'd get up and start right doing them again. I was killing myself. I'd definitely hit bottom with it. I would never sleep. I'd stay up six or seven days or nights at a time, and I wouldn't go home. My health was bad, I had dizzy spells where I could hardly drive, I had cars strewed all over this town, because I'd get somewhere, and I'd have to leave 'em and have somebody else take me home.

Jennings walks into a Nashville courtroom on August 31, 1977 whilst swarmed by reporters and media.

On August 23, 1977, Jennings was arrested by Drug Enforcement Administration ; (DEA) officers at American Studios, where he was laying down harmony vocals on "Storms Never Last" during a session for a Hank Williams Jr. album that he was co-producing. The officials had traced a package that had been sent there from his manager Neil Reshen's office in New York City through his assistant Mark Rothbaum. The package did indeed contain cocaine, but drummer Richie Albright managed to flush the drug down a commode before the officers could find it. They charged Jennings anyway but the singer was never convicted of the crime due to critical faults in the legal process against him. Still, Jennings was shaken by the bust, remarking in the audio version of his autobiography, "When you see yourself spread across the front pages - 'Waylon Jennings Arrested for Possession of Cocaine!' - it gets to you a little bit...It was a media feeding frenzy, like sharks smelling blood in the water. I couldn't go anywhere without a cluster of reporters swarmin' around me." Jennings added that the case cost him about $100,000 in legal fees, but his cocaine use continued unabated as he began to further isolate himself. The publicity did not hurt his sales, however, with author Michael Striessguth noting, "Waylon's public cocaine troubles only fueled his record sales. His five solo singles after the arrest rushed to the top five, and his albums sailed just as swiftly. On the surface, his two solo albums released after the bust - I've Always Been Crazy and What Goes Around Comes Around - communicated defiance."

== Critical reception ==
Professional ratings
Review scores
Source	Rating
AllMusic	4/5 stars
The Rolling Stone Album Guide	3/5 stars

At the time of its release, Nick Toches stated that I've Always Been Crazy tolled Waylon's "farewell to outlawry." Thom Jurek of AllMusic insists that the LP "smokes... In all, I've Always Been Crazy is a solid recording, still possessing the piss and vinegar of Jennings' best work with a deeper lyrical edge on most tracks...this is necessary for any fan of outlaw country in general and Jennings in particular."

== Track listing ==
1. "I've Always Been Crazy" (Waylon Jennings) – 4:12
2. "Don't You Think This Outlaw Bit's Done Got Out of Hand" (Jennings) – 3:00
3. "Billy" (Tony Joe White) – 4:18
4. "A Long Time Ago" (Jennings, Shel Silverstein) – 2:23
5. "As the 'Billy World Turns" (Jennings) – 3:00
6. Medley of Buddy Holly Hits: (Buddy Holly, Jerry Allison, Joe B. Mauldin, Norman Petty) – 6:04
  "Well All Right"
  "It's So Easy"
  "Maybe Baby"
  "Peggy Sue"
7. "I Walk the Line" (Johnny Cash) – 3:31
8. "Tonight the Bottle Let Me Down" (Merle Haggard) – 3:31
9. "Girl I Can Tell (You're Trying to Work It Out)" (Fred Carter, Jennings) – 2:40
10. "Whistlers and Jugglers" (Shel Silverstein) – 4:34
    - "Medley of Buddy Holly Hits" produced by Duane Eddy

== Chart performance ==
Chart (1978)	Peak position
U.S. Billboard Top Country Albums	1
U.S. Billboard 200	48
Canadian RPM Country Albums	1
Canadian RPM Top Albums	71

== Certifications ==
Region	Certification	Certified units/sales
United States (RIAA)	Gold	500,000^{^}
^{^} Shipments figures based on certification alone.

== Bibliography ==
- Jennings, Waylon; Kaye, Lenny (1996). Waylon: An Autobiography. Warner Brooks. ISBN 978-0-446-51865-9.
- Streissguth, Michael (2013). Outlaw: Waylon, Willie, Kris, and the Renegades of Nashville. HarperCollins. ISBN 978-0062038180.
