= Never Could Toe the Mark (song) =

Single by Waylon Jennings

from the album Never Could Toe the Mark
- B-side: "Talk Good Boogie"
- Released: June 16, 1984
- Genre: Country
- Length: 3:00
- Label: RCA Nashville
- Songwriter: Waylon Jennings
- Producers: Waylon Jennings, Alan Cartee, Don Cartee, Brent Cartee

Waylon Jennings singles chronology
"I May Be Used (But Baby I Ain't Used Up)" (1984)	"Never Could Toe the Mark" (1984)	"America" (1984)

"Never Could Toe the Mark" is a song written and recorded by American country music artist Waylon Jennings. It was released in June 1984 as the first single and title track from the album Never Could Toe the Mark The song reached number 6 on the Billboard Hot Country Singles & Tracks chart. A music video was made for it at a live taping on May 15, 1984 at the Tennessee Performing Arts Center and was released on June 1, 1984.

== Chart performance ==
Chart (1984)	Peak position
US Hot Country Songs (Billboard)	6
Canadian RPM Country Tracks	2
