= Turn the Page (Waylon Jennings album) =

Studio album by Waylon Jennings
- Released: July 1985
- Genre: Country; outlaw country
- Label: RCA Victor
- Producer: Jerry Bridges; Gary Scruggs

Waylon Jennings chronology
Never Could Toe the Mark (1984)	Turn the Page (1985)	Sweet Mother Texas (1986)

Turn the Page is the thirty-second studio album by American country music artist Waylon Jennings, released on RCA Records in 1985.

== Background ==
Jennings recorded the album at a time when he was completely drug-free; this had not occurred in his career for about twenty years. In April 1984, Jennings rented a house in Arizona for himself, his wife Jessi Colter, and young son Shooter, and quit cocaine cold turkey, although he did not intend to quit for good. Jennings was inspired to remain drug free mainly because of his son.

== Critical reception ==
Turn the Page, the second-to-last studio album Jennings would release for RCA at a point when the demand for his music had already diminished significantly, reached #23 on the Billboard country albums chart. The album produced one hit: "Drinkin' and Dreamin,'" which reached #2, and #26 in Canada.

== Track listing ==
1. "The Devil's on the Loose" (Larry Willoughby)
2. "You Showed Me Somethin' About Lovin'" (Phil Redrow)
3. "Good Morning John" (Kris Kristofferson)
4. "The Broken Promise Land" (Bill Rice, Sharon Vaughn)
5. "Don't Bring It Around Anymore" (Gary Nicholson, Marshall Morgan, Nancy Montgomery, Walter McEuen)
6. "Rhiannon" (Stevie Nicks)
7. "Drinkin' and Dreamin'" (Troy Seals, Max D. Barnes) – 2:59
8. "As Far as the Eye Can See" (Billy Gale)
9. "Turn the Page" (Bob Seger) – 4:37
10. "Those Kind of Memories" (Jim McBride, Stewart Harris)

=== Bonus tracks ===
1. "America" (Sammy Johns)

== Production ==
- Producer: Jerry Bridges, Gary Scruggs
- Art Direction: Tal Howell
- Cover Photography: Jim McGuire

== Personnel ==
- Pickers: Waylon Jennings, Ralph Mooney, Jerry Bridges, Gary Scruggs, Floyd Domino, Dan Mustoe, Sony Curtis, Wayne Jackson
- Singers: Waylon Jennings, Patti Leatherwood, Kay Milete, Colleen Peterson, Bonnie Gallie

== Chart performance ==
Chart (1985)	Peak position
U.S. Billboard Top Country Albums	23
