= What Goes Around Comes Around =

Studio album by Waylon Jennings
- Released: November 1979
- Recorded: January 6, 1979–June 20, 1979
- Studios: American Studios, Nashville
- Genres: Country; outlaw country
- Length: 32:46
- Label: RCA Victor
- Producers: Waylon Jennings Richie Albright

Waylon Jennings chronology
Greatest Hits (1979)	What Goes Around Comes Around (1979)	Music Man (1980)

Singles from What Goes Around Comes Around
- 1. "Come with Me" Released: August 1979; 2. "I Ain't Living Long Like This" Released: December 1979

What Goes Around Comes Around is the twenty-sixth studio album by American country music artist Waylon Jennings, released on RCA Victor in 1979.

== Background ==
By 1979, Jennings was on the tail end of a hot streak that had made him one of the biggest superstars in country music. He had scored twelve Top 10 country hits since 1973 (including six chart toppers) and had recorded 4 straight No. 1 country albums, with 1977's Ol' Waylon also hitting No. 15 on the pop music charts. Along with fellow outlaw Willie Nelson, he was at the forefront of what was being referred to as outlaw country, a musical movement rooted in a rock and roll attitude and musical freedom. Jennings had also become a big box office draw and in-demand recording artist; in 1979, he sang with Nelson and country legend Ernest Tubb on "You Nearly Lose Your Mind" for Tubb's The Legend and the Legacy album and also appeared on his friend George Jones' duet album My Very Special Guests. Unfortunately, Jennings enormous commercial success ran parallel with a crippling cocaine addiction that was draining his resources. In his autobiography, he admitted to spending as much as $20,000 each time he scored, or about $1,500 a day. A 1977 drug bust had rattled him but he continued using, and in 1980 he would discover that he was broke.

== Recording and composition ==
Released when the outlaw country movement was already visibly past its prime, What Goes Around Comes Around was Jennings' first album since 1975 not to reach No. 1 on the Billboard country albums chart, peaking at No. 2. It remained at No. 2 for 14 weeks and would have likely topped the charts had it not been for the crossover success of Kenny Rogers' Kenny. Production duties were largely left to longtime Waylors drummer Richie Albright, with Jennings later saying, "As the seventies closed, Richie moved formally into producing me. What Goes Around Comes Around and Music Man were bookends of my music in overdrive." "I Ain't Living Long Like This", a song written by Rodney Crowell, reached the top of the country charts and played off Jennings' 1977 drug bust for cocaine possession, with the singer recalling in the audio version of his autobiography Waylon:

I never tried to hide it. Maybe that's why the feds wanted to get me, I really don't know. They could've had me a lot of times before. They knew it and I knew it, too. We rode around with our high beams on, three buses and two trucks. We might as well have had flashing lights on top of the whole convoy lettin' the whole world know that we did drugs. "We take drugs. We buy drugs. We have drugs. We don't sell drugs but we sure eat 'em." It was obvious.

The album contains several cuts written by songwriters who helped shape the outlaw movement in the 1970s, including Shel Silverstein, who collaborated with Jennings on the waltz "It's the World's Gone Crazy" ("The villains have turned into heroes, the heroes have turned into heels..."), and Mickey Newbury, who composed the beautifully sad "If You See Her." In fact, despite his hellraising persona and reckless drug use at the time, the second half of What Goes Around Comes Around is composed of mostly ballads, and although the LP is often viewed as the beginning of the end as far as Jennings' commercial run goes, AllMusic's Stephen Thomas Erlewine cautions:

The generally accepted conventional wisdom about Jennings' late-'70s/early-'80s records is that they pale in comparison to his early-'70s records, which is true on the surface but does albums like What Goes Around a disservice...the music isn't splashy and the album, as a whole, is more cohesive than I've Always Been Crazy, even if it isn't as weighty as Ol' Waylon. Reading between the lines, it's easy to hear Jennings getting a little weary under the hot spotlight of stardom - there's the storming opener of Rodney Crowell's "I Ain't Living Long Like This," which easily became an anthem for the waning days of outlaw, but there's an underlying sense of sadness that runs through the record, particularly the ballad-heavy second half.

One of these ballads, Chuck Howard's "Come With Me," was released in August 1979 and stayed at No. 1 for two weeks, spending a total of thirteen weeks on the country chart.

The album cover was Jennings' first studio album to feature his distinctive logo on the cover, surrounded by neon and stars (I've Always Been Crazy, released the year before, had the logo on the back). The uncharacteristically garish cover concept came from RCA executive Jerry Bradley, who was unperturbed by the bad publicity surrounding his star's drug problems: "A little bit of drugs was selling records for Waylon in my mind. Maybe a rebellious attitude, along with the Outlaws album, [sic] didn't hurt. I'm not trying to be mean when I say that, but the mafia didn't hurt Sinatra." The photograph on the cover was taken by Charlyn Zlotnik.

== Critical reception ==
Professional ratings
Review scores
Source	Rating
AllMusic	3.5/5 stars

At the time of its release, music critic Marsha Hume stated, "Side two consists of ballads the likes of which Jennings hasn't sung in some time. In the hands of a lesser talent, a few of these songs...would sound overly sentimental. But Jennings' rough baritone can handle a soulful ballad, and his masculine style makes him seem all the more vulnerable." The New York Times determined that Jennings's "gruff voice has softened and his macho bluster has turned tender."

AllMusic wrote: "Since Waylon's first-rate work is so good and so bountiful, it's easy to overlook the relatively modest pleasures of a record like this, but only a fool would dismiss it out of hand, because there's a lot of good music here - more than enough to justify his continued hot streak."

== Track listing ==
No.	Title	Writer(s)	Length
1.	"I Ain't Living Long Like This"	Rodney Crowell	4:44
2.	"What Goes Around"	Michael Smotherman	2:54
3.	"Another Man's Fool"	Edmund Ullrich	2:53
4.	"I Got the Train Sittin' Waitin'"	Billy Ray Reynolds	2:38
5.	"It's the World's Gone Crazy (Cotillion)"	Jennings, Shel Silverstein	2:24
6.	"Ivory Tower"	Clifford Robertson	2:41
7.	"Out Among the Stars"	Adam Mitchell	3:31
8.	"Come With Me"	Chuck Howard	2:59
9.	"If You See Her"	Mickey Newbury	3:24
10.	"Old Love, New Eyes"	Crowell, Hank DeVito	4:38

== Personnel ==
- Waylon Jennings - vocals, electric and acoustic guitar, banjo
- Rance Wasson - electric and acoustic guitar
- Gordon Payne - electric and acoustic guitar, harmonica
- Jerry Bridges - bass
- Ralph Mooney - steel guitar
- Muscle Shoals Horns - horns
- Barny Robertson - keyboards
- Carter Robertson - background vocals
- Richie Albright - drums, percussion

== Certifications ==
Region	Certification	Certified units/sales
United States (RIAA)	Gold	500,000^{^}
^{^} Shipments figures based on certification alone.

== Bibliography ==
- Jennings, Waylon; Kaye, Lenny (1996). Waylon: An Autobiography. Warner Brooks. ISBN 978-0-446-51865-9.
- Streissguth, Michael (2013). Outlaw: Waylon, Willie, Kris, and the Renegades of Nashville. HarperCollins. ISBN 978-0062038180.
