= Drinkin' and Dreamin' =

Single by Waylon Jennings

from the album Turn the Page
- B-side: "Prophets Show Up in Strange Places"
- Released: June 22, 1985
- Genre: Country
- Length: 3:01
- Label: RCA Nashville
- Songwriter(s): Troy Seals, Max D. Barnes
- Producer(s): Jerry Bridges, Gary Scruggs

Waylon Jennings singles chronology
"Highwayman" (1985)	"Drinkin' and Dreamin'" (1985)	"Desperados Waiting for a Train" (1985)

"Drinkin' and Dreamin'" is a song written by Troy Seals and Max D. Barnes, and recorded by American country music artist Waylon Jennings. It was released in June 1985 as the first single from the album Turn the Page. The song reached No. 2 on the Billboard Hot Country Singles & Tracks chart.

== Charts ==
=== Weekly charts ===
Chart (1985)	Peak position
US Hot Country Songs (Billboard)	2
Canadian RPM Country Tracks	26

=== Year-end charts ===
Chart (1985)	Position
US Hot Country Songs (Billboard)	16
