= Will the Wolf Survive (song) =

1984 single by Los Lobos

"Will the Wolf Survive?"

Single by Los Lobos

from the album How Will the Wolf Survive?
- B-side: "The Breakdown"
- Released: 1984
- Genre: Chicano rock
- Length: 3:41
- Label: Slash/Warner Bros.
- Songwriters: David Hidalgo, Louie Pérez
- Producer: T-Bone Burnett

Los Lobos singles chronology
"Don't Worry Baby" (1984)	"Will the Wolf Survive?" (1984)	"Shakin' Shakin' Shakes" (1987)

"Will the Wolf Survive?" is a single by American Chicano rock band Los Lobos. It was released in 1984 as the second single from their album How Will the Wolf Survive? The track was recorded with a drum machine.

== Critical reception ==
The song reached number 26 on the Billboard Top Rock Tracks chart and number 78 on the Billboard Hot 100.

Cash Box said that the song "features beautiful high harmonies on the chorus from John Hiatt as well as a melodically rich guitar lead from Cesar Rosas." Spin wrote, "It's a song Los Lobos have been writing in their heads for 12 years. Los Lobos have endured and the hard-won lessons of more than a decade of playing are now being transferred, practically without effort, into their vibrant music."

Chart performance for "Will the Wolf Survive"
Chart (1984)	Peak
U.S. Billboard Top Rock Tracks	26
US Billboard Hot 100	78

== Waylon Jennings version ==
"Will the Wolf Survive?"

Single by Waylon Jennings

from the album Will the Wolf Survive?
- B-side: "I've Got Me a Woman"
- Released: May 17, 1986
- Genre: Country
- Length: 3:25
- Label: MCA
- Songwriters: David Hidalgo, Louie Pérez
- Producers: Jimmy Bowen, Waylon Jennings

Waylon Jennings singles chronology
"Working Without a Net" (1986)	"Will the Wolf Survive?" (1986)	"Even Cowgirls Get the Blues" (1986)

"Will the Wolf Survive?" was also recorded by American country music artist Waylon Jennings. It was released in May 1986 as the second single and title track from the album Will the Wolf Survive?. The song reached number 5 on the Billboard Hot Country Singles & Tracks chart.

=== Chart performance ===
Chart (1986)	Peak position
US Hot Country Songs (Billboard)	5
Canadian RPM Country Tracks	5
