= Working Without a Net =

Single by Waylon Jennings

from the album Will the Wolf Survive
- B-side: "They Ain't Got 'Em All"
- Released: February 15, 1986
- Genre: Country
- Length: 2:41
- Label: MCA
- Songwriters: Gary Nicholson, John Barlow Jarvis, Don Cook
- Producers: Jimmy Bowen, Waylon Jennings

Waylon Jennings singles chronology
"The Devil's on the Loose" (1985)	"Working Without a Net" (1986)	"Will the Wolf Survive" (1986)

"Working Without a Net" is a song written by Gary Nicholson, John Barlow Jarvis and Don Cook, and recorded by American country music artist Waylon Jennings. It was released in February 1986 as the first single from the album Will the Wolf Survive. The song reached number 7 on the Billboard Hot Country Singles & Tracks chart.

== Chart performance ==
Chart (1986)	Peak position
US Hot Country Songs (Billboard)	7
Canadian RPM Country Tracks	5
