= What You'll Do When I'm Gone =

Single by Waylon Jennings

from the album Will the Wolf Survive
- B-side: "That Dog Won't Hunt"
- Released: September 20, 1986
- Genre: Country
- Length: 2:56
- Label: MCA
- Songwriter: Larry Butler
- Producers: Jimmy Bowen, Waylon Jennings

Waylon Jennings singles chronology
"Even Cowgirls Get the Blues" (1986)	"What You'll Do When I'm Gone" (1986)	"Rose in Paradise" (1987)

"What You'll Do When I'm Gone" is a song written by Larry Butler, and recorded by American country music artist Waylon Jennings. It was released in September 1986 as the third single from the album Will the Wolf Survive. The song reached number 8 on the Billboard Hot Country Singles & Tracks chart.

== Chart performance ==
Chart (1986)	Peak position
US Hot Country Songs (Billboard)	8
Canadian RPM Country Tracks	16
