= Silver Stallion (song) =

Song by Lee Clayton

Song by Lee Clayton

from the album Border Affair
- Released: 1978
- Genre: Country
- Label: Capitol
- Songwriter: Lee Clayton

Music video
- "Silver Stallion" on YouTube

"Silver Stallion" is a song written by Lee Clayton and originally released by him on his 1978 album Border Affair.

== Track listing ==
7" UK promo single (Capitol CL15982, 1978)
| No. | Title | Writer(s) | Length |
|---|---|---|---|
| 1. | "Silver Stallion" | Lee Clayton |
| 2. | "Border Affair" | Lee Clayton |

== The Highwaymen version ==
"Silver Stallion"

Single by The Highwaymen

from the album Highwayman 2
- B-side: "American Remains"
- Released: 1990
- Genre: Country
- Length: 3:12
- Label: Columbia 38-73233
- Songwriter: Lee Clayton
- Producer: Chips Moman

Music video
- "Silver Stallion" on YouTube

The song was later covered by Waylon Jennings, Willie Nelson, Johnny Cash, and Kris Kristofferson and became the opening track of their 1990 album Highwayman 2. Released in 1990 as a lead single (Columbia 38-73233, with "American Remains" on the opposite side) from the album, the song peaked at number 25 on U.S. Billboard's country chart for the week of April 28.

=== Track listing ===
7" single (Columbia 38-73233, 1990)
| No. | Title | Writer(s) | Length |
|---|---|---|---|
| 1. | "Silver Stallion" | L. Clayton | 3:12 |
| 2. | "American Remains" | R. Rutherford | 4:06 |

=== Charts ===
| Chart (1990) | Peak position |
|---|---|
| US Hot Country Songs (Billboard) | 25 |

== Other versions ==
Singer-songwriter Cat Power covered the song on her 2008 album Jukebox.
