= Never Could Toe the Mark =

Studio album by Waylon Jennings
- Released: June 1984
- Genres: Country; outlaw country
- Length: 27:01
- Label: RCA Victor
- Producers: Waylon Jennings; Don Cartee; Alan Cartee; Brent Cartee

Waylon Jennings chronology
Waylon and Company (1983)	Never Could Toe the Mark (1984)	Waylon's Greatest Hits, Vol. 2 (1984)

Professional ratings
Review scores
Source	Rating
Allmusic	2/5 stars

Never Could Toe the Mark is the thirty-first studio album by American country music artist Waylon Jennings, released on RCA Victor in 1984.

== Track listing ==
All tracks composed by Waylon Jennings, except where indicated.

1. "Never Could Toe the Mark" – 2:55
2. "Talk Good Boogie" - 2:19
3. "People Up in Texas" - 2:23
4. "Sparkling Brown Eyes" (Bill Cox) - 2:39
5. "If She'll Leave Her Mama" (Mack Vickery, Lamar Morris) - 2:41
6. "Settin' Me Up" (Mark Knopfler) - 2:24
7. "The Gemini Song (When I'm Bad, I'm Bad)" - 2:30
8. "Where Would I Be" (Paul Kennerley) - 2:47
9. "Whatever Gets You Through the Night" (Bob McDill) - 3:38
10. "The Entertainer" (Billy Joel) - 2:45

== Personnel ==
=== Pickers ===
- Waylon Jennings
- Ralph Mooney
- Jerry Bridges
- Gary Scruggs
- Floyd Domino
- Dan Mustoe
- Tony Joe White
- Jerry Gropp
- J. I. Allison
- Roger "Rock" Williams & Co.
- Don Cartee

=== Singers ===
- Waylon Jennings
- Jessi Colter
- Jerry Bridges
- Gary Scruggs
- Debbie Smith
- Kay Milete
- Crystal Milete
- Angel Milete

=== Technical and visuals ===
- Producer: Waylon Jennings, Alan Cartee, Brent Cartee, Don Cartee
- Art direction: Hogan Entertainment Design
- Photography: Mark Tucker

== Chart performance ==
Chart (1984)	Peak position
U.S. Billboard Top Country Albums	20
