= Waltz Me to Heaven =

Single by Waylon Jennings

from the album Waylon's Greatest Hits, Vol. 2
- B-side: "Dream On"
- Released: January 19, 1985
- Genre: Country
- Length: 3:08
- Label: RCA Nashville
- Songwriter(s): Dolly Parton
- Producer(s): Jerry Bridges, Gary Scruggs

Waylon Jennings singles chronology
"America" (1984)	"Waltz Me to Heaven" (1985)	"Highwayman" (1985)

"Waltz Me to Heaven" is a song written by Dolly Parton, and recorded by American country music artist Waylon Jennings. It was released in January 1985 as the second single from his compilation album Waylon's Greatest Hits, Vol. 2. The song reached number 10 on the Billboard Hot Country Singles & Tracks chart.

== Chart performance ==
Chart (1985)	Peak position
US Hot Country Songs (Billboard)	10
Canadian RPM Country Tracks	14
