= Black on Black =

Studio album by Waylon Jennings
- Released: February 1982
- Recorded: Moman's Studio, Nashville
- Genre: Country; outlaw country
- Length: 29:16
- Label: RCA Victor
- Producer: Chips Moman

Waylon Jennings chronology
Leather and Lace (1982)	Black on Black (1982)	WWII (1982)

Professional ratings
Review scores
Source	Rating
Allmusic	link

Black on Black is the twenty-eighth studio album by American country music artist Waylon Jennings, released on RCA Victor in 1982.

== Background ==
By 1981, Jennings' excessive lifestyle had caught up to him financially. Despite a string of #1 albums and sellout concerts, the overhead of keeping his show on the road combined with his cocaine habit had drained nearly all of his resources. In the audio version of his autobiography Waylon, he admitted to spending up to $1,500 a day on the drug and also confessed to being out of touch with the personnel on his tours:

"The tours were runnin' well into the red. People were hanging out and gettin' paid for it. We had close to fifty bodies on our payroll, and I was not sure of what any of 'em were doing. There were at least twenty more people than we needed on the crew, and if I saw somebody twice in a week, I'd ask Richie [Albright], 'Are they workin' for us?'...For every million dollars I was takin' in, I was spending two million."

In the spring of 1981, Jennings, drummer Richie Albright, and financial advisor Bill Robinson went over the singer's business affairs at a hotel in Los Angeles and found that he owed more than two million dollars and was over $800,000 overdrawn to the bank.

== Track listing ==
No.	Title	Writer(s)	Length
1.	"Women Do Know How to Carry On"	Bobby Emmons, Waylon Jennings	3:17
2.	"Honky Tonk Blues"	Hank Williams	2:42
3.	"Just to Satisfy You"	Don Bowman, Jennings	2:48
4.	"(We Made It as Lovers) We Just Couldn't Make It as Friends"	Emmons, Chips Moman	2:12
5.	"Shine"	Jennings	2:49
6.	"Folsom Prison Blues"	Johnny Cash	2:40
7.	"Gonna Write a Letter"	Paul Kennerley	2:35
8.	"May I Borrow Some Sugar from You"	Emmons, Moman	3:21
9.	"Song for the Life"	Rodney Crowell	3:39
10.	"Get Naked With Me"	Emmons	3:13

== Production ==
- Producer: Chips Moman
- Liner Photo: Catrina O'Brian

== Personnel ==
- Pickers: Waylon Jennings, Chips Moman, Bobby Emmons, Johnny Christopher, Ralph Mooney, Jerry Bridges, Reggie Young, Gary Scruggs, Jerry Gropp, Bobby Wood, Gene Chrisman, Tommy Cogbill, Mike Leech
- Singers: Waylon Jennings, Jessi Colter, Toni Wine, Chips Moman, Johnny Christopher, Gary Scruggs, Jerry Gropp, Willie Nelson

== Charts ==
=== Weekly charts ===
Chart (1982)	Peak position
US Billboard 200	39
US Top Country Albums (Billboard)	3

=== Year-end charts ===
Chart (1982)	Position
US Top Country Albums (Billboard)	19
