= Just to Satisfy You (song) =

1964 single by Waylon Jennings

Single by Waylon Jennings
- A-side: "Four Strong Winds"
- Released: August 1964
- Genre: Country
- Length: 2:10
- Label: A&M
- Songwriters: Don Bowman; Waylon Jennings

"Just to Satisfy You"

Single by Waylon Jennings and Willie Nelson

from the album Black on Black
- B-side: "Get Naked with Me"
- Released: February 1982
- Genre: Country
- Length: 2:48
- Label: RCA Nashville
- Songwriters: Don Bowman; Waylon Jennings
- Producer: Chips Moman

Waylon Jennings singles chronology
"Shine" (1981)	"Just to Satisfy You" (1982)	"Women Do Know How to Carry On" (1982)

Willie Nelson singles chronology
"Always on My Mind" (1982)	"Just to Satisfy You" (1982)	"Old Friends" (1982)

"Just to Satisfy You" is a song written by American country music singers Waylon Jennings and Don Bowman in 1963. Jennings included the song in his performing repertoire, and on radio, where the song became a local hit in Phoenix, Arizona.

The song was later re-recorded and made the title-track of his 1969 album, while in 1982 he once again re-recorded it as a duet version along with Willie Nelson, that peaked at number one for two weeks on the Billboard Hot Country Singles.

The song was also released in June 1967 by Glen Campbell on the Burning Bridges album and in January 1970 by Jerry Reed on his album Cookin'.

== Background and recordings ==
Waylon Jennings and Don Bowman wrote the song in 1963. The same year, Jennings signed a recording contract with A&M Records. His releases had little success, because the main releases of the label were folk music rather than country. Despite the low success of his records, the single "Just To Satisfy You" backed with Ian Tyson's "Four Strong Winds" were radio hits in Phoenix, Arizona. Singer Bobby Bare, who liked Jennings' style, covered both songs and recommended Jennings to producer Chet Atkins, who signed him to RCA Victor in 1965.

In 1967, during an interview, Jennings remarked that the song was a "pretty good example" of the influence of his work with Buddy Holly and rockabilly music. Despite that the song was included in Jennings performing repertoire, it was not released as a single, but it was included two years later as the title-track of his 1969 album. In 1982, Waylon Jennings and Willie Nelson recorded the song again, which became their third number one country hit as a duo. The single spent two weeks at number one and a total of twelve weeks on the country chart.

In 1987, Barbara Mandrell, recorded the song for her "Sure Feels Good" album. The song was never released as a single.

== Charts ==
=== Weekly charts ===
Chart (1982)	Peak position
US Billboard Hot 100	52
US Hot Country Songs (Billboard)	1
Canadian RPM Country Tracks	2

=== Year-end charts ===
Chart (1982)	Position
US Hot Country Songs (Billboard)	6
