= I May Be Used (But Baby I Ain't Used Up) =

Single by Waylon Jennings

from the album Waylon and Company
- B-side: "So You Want to Be a Cowboy Singer"
- Released: March 3, 1984
- Genre: Country
- Length: 2:59
- Label: RCA Nashville
- Songwriter: Bob McDill
- Producer: Waylon Jennings

Waylon Jennings singles chronology
"The Conversation" (1983)	"I May Be Used (But Baby I Ain't Used Up)" (1984)	"Never Could Toe the Mark" (1984)

"I May Be Used (But Baby I Ain't Used Up)" is a song written by Bob McDill, and recorded by American country music artist Waylon Jennings. It was released in March 1984 as the third single from the album Waylon and Company. The song reached number 4 on the Hot Country Songs chart.

== Chart performance ==
Chart (1984)	Peak position
US Hot Country Songs (Billboard)	4
Canadian RPM Country Tracks	4
