= Women Do Know How to Carry On =

Single by Waylon Jennings

from the album Black on Black
- B-side: "Honky Tonk Blues"
- Released: June 26, 1982
- Genre: Country
- Length: 3:18
- Label: RCA Nashville
- Songwriter(s): Waylon Jennings, Bobby Emmons
- Producer(s): Chips Moman

Waylon Jennings singles chronology
"Just to Satisfy You" (1982)	"Women Do Know How to Carry On" (1982)	"(Sittin' On) The Dock of the Bay" (1982)

"Women Do Know How to Carry On" is a song co-written and recorded by American country music artist Waylon Jennings. It was released in June 1982 as the third single from the album Black on Black. The song reached number 4 on the Billboard Hot Country Singles & Tracks chart. The song was written by Jennings and Bobby Emmons.

== Chart performance ==
Chart (1982)	Peak position
US Hot Country Songs (Billboard)	4
Canadian RPM Country Tracks	6
