= Shine (Waylon Jennings song) =

Single by Waylon Jennings

from the album Black on Black
- B-side: "White Water"
- Released: November 1981
- Genre: Country
- Length: 2:49
- Label: RCA Nashville
- Songwriter: Waylon Jennings
- Producer: Chips Moman

Waylon Jennings singles chronology
"The Wild Side of Life" (1981)	"Shine" (1981)	"Just to Satisfy You" (1982)

"Shine" is a song written and recorded by American country music artist Waylon Jennings. It was released in November 1981 as the first single from his album Black on Black. The song reached #5 on the Billboard Hot Country Singles chart and #1 on the RPM Country Tracks chart in Canada. It was also the closing theme in the 1981 film "The Pursuit of D. B. Cooper" under a bluegrass version of the song.

== Charts ==
Chart (1981–1982)	Peak position
US Hot Country Songs (Billboard)	5
Canadian RPM Country Tracks	1
