= America (Waylon Jennings song) =

Single by Waylon Jennings

from the album Waylon's Greatest Hits, Vol. 2
- B-side: "People Up in Texas"
- Released: September 20, 1984
- Genre: Country
- Length: 3:27
- Label: RCA Nashville
- Songwriter(s): Sammy Johns
- Producer(s): Jerry Bridges, Gary Scruggs

Waylon Jennings singles chronology
"Never Could Toe the Mark" (1984)	"America" (1984)	"Waltz Me to Heaven" (1985)

"America" is a song written by Sammy Johns, and recorded by American country music artist Waylon Jennings. It was released in September 1984 as the first single from his compilation album Waylon's Greatest Hits, Vol. 2. The song reached number 6 on the Billboard Hot Country Singles & Tracks chart.

== Music video ==
The music video was directed by David Hogan and premiered in September 1984 on CMT. It features scenes from all across the United States - such as farming, people playing sports, natural landscapes and the Statue of Liberty. Scenes also feature Jennings singing the song outside of a convenience store at a gas station with the American flag on it.

== Chart performance ==
Chart (1984–1985)	Peak position
US Hot Country Songs (Billboard)	6
