= The Road Goes On Forever (The Highwaymen album) =

The Road Goes on Forever

Studio album by The Highwaymen
- Released: April 4, 1995
- Recorded: October 31–November 9, 1994
- Studio: Ocean Way, Hollywood
- Genre: Country; outlaw country
- Length: 36:32
- Label: Liberty; Capitol Nashville; EMI
- Producer: Don Was

The Highwaymen chronology
Highwayman 2 (1990)	The Road Goes on Forever (1995)

Johnny Cash chronology
The Man in Black 1963–1969 (1995)	The Road Goes on Forever (1995)	Unchained (1996)

Waylon Jennings chronology
Waymore's Blues (Part II) (1994)	The Road Goes on Forever (1995)	Right for the Time (1996)

Singles from The Road Goes on Forever
- 1. "It Is What It Is" Released: April 1995

Professional ratings
Review scores
Source	Rating
AllMusic	3/5 stars
Robert Christgau	A−
Rolling Stone	3/5 stars

The Road Goes on Forever is the third and final studio album by the American country music supergroup the Highwaymen. It was released on April 4, 1995, on Liberty Records and reached 45 on the U.S. Billboard Top Country Albums chart. The title track of this album was written by Robert Earl Keen, Jr. and originally recorded on his 1989 album, West Textures.

== Reissue ==
The album was re-released on November 8, 2005, on Capitol Nashville/EMI with bonus tracks and, in some versions, an extra DVD for the album's 10th anniversary. The DVD includes a music video for "It Is What It Is", as well as a short documentary entitled Live Forever - In the Studio with the Highwaymen.

== Track listing ==
No.	Title	Writer(s)	Length
1.	"The Devil's Right Hand"	Steve Earle	3:14
2.	"Live Forever"	Billy Joe Shaver, Eddy Shaver	2:49
3.	"Everyone Gets Crazy"	Kevin Welch	2:55
4.	"It Is What It Is"	Stephen Bruton, John Fleming	3:40
5.	"I Do Believe"	Waylon Jennings	3:25
6.	"The End of Understanding"	Willie Nelson	2:43
7.	"True Love Travels a Gravel Road"	Dallas Frazier, A.L. Owens	3:22
8.	"Death and Hell"	Johnny Cash, John Carter Cash	2:51
9.	"Waiting for a Long Time"	Bruton	4:20
10.	"Here Comes That Rainbow Again"	Kris Kristofferson	2:50
11.	"The Road Goes on Forever"	Robert Earl Keen	4:42

2005 reissue bonus tracks
No.	Title	Writer(s)	Length
12.	"If He Came Back Again"	Barry Alfonso, Craig Bickhardt	3:34
13.	"Live Forever"	Billy Joe Shaver, Eddy Shaver	2:12
14.	"I Ain't Song"	Jennings	1:56
15.	"Pick Up the Tempo"	Nelson	2:18
16.	"Closer to the Bone"	Kris Kristofferson	2:14
17.	"Back in the Saddle Again"	Gene Autry, Ray Whitley	0:50

=== 2005 bonus disc (DVD) ===
1. Live Forever – In the Studio with the Highwaymen (video)
2. "It Is What It Is" (video)

== Charts ==
Chart performance for The Road Goes On Forever
Chart (1995)	Peak position
Australia ARIA Charts (Australia)	46
Norwegian Albums (VG-lista)	11
US Top Country Albums (Billboard)	42

== Personnel ==
The Highwaymen

- Johnny Cash – vocals, guitar
- Waylon Jennings – vocals, guitar
- Kris Kristofferson – vocals, guitar
- Willie Nelson – vocals, guitar

Additional musicians

- Reggie Young – electric guitar
- Al Anderson – electric and acoustic guitar
- Mark Goldenberg – acoustic guitar, baritone guitar, electric guitar
- Michael Rhodes – bass
- Danny Timms – piano
- Luis Resto – Wurlitzer electric piano
- Benmont Tench – Hammond C-3 organ
- Kenny Aronoff – drums
- Mickey Raphael – harmonica
- Robby Turner – pedal steel guitar, dobro

Technical personnel

- Produced by: Don Was
- Recorded By: Rik Pekkonen at Ocean Way, Hollywood, CA
- Assisted By: Young Dan Bosworth
- Second Assistants: Trini Alveraz and Jeff Demorris
- Additional Recording by Barry Taylor at Caravell, Branson, MO
- Mixed By: Chuck Ainlay at Record Planet, Hollywood, CA
- Assisted By: Brian Pollack
- Minister of Information: Jane Oppenheimer
- Album Production Coordinator: Carrie McConkey for The Marsha Burns Company
- Consigliere: Mart Rothbaum
- Art Direction: Sherri Halford and Buddy Jackson
- Design: B. Middleworth for Jackson Design
- Cover Photography: Frank Ockenfels
- Additional Photography: Patrick Ockenfels
- Makeup: Diane Weidenmann

Reissue Credits

- Producer: Don Was
- Reissue Producer: Rob Christie
- Remastering: Ed Cherney and Ron McMaster @ Capitol Studios, Hollywood
- Remixing: ("If He Came Back Home Again"): Don Was and Ed Cherney
- Liner Notes: Chet Flippo, Willie Nelson, Kris Kristofferson
- Art Design: Shannon Ward for Den 45 @ EMI
- Design: Rene Neri for Den 145 @ EMI
- Photography: Frank Ockenfels, Patrick Simpson
