= I've Always Been Crazy (song) =

Single by Waylon Jennings

from the album I've Always Been Crazy
- B-side: "I Never Said It Would Be East"
- Released: June 1978
- Recorded: 1978
- Genre: Country; outlaw country
- Length: 4:12
- Label: RCA
- Songwriter: Waylon Jennings
- Producers: Waylon Jennings; Richie Albright

Waylon Jennings singles chronology
"There Ain't No Good Chain Gang" (1978)	"I've Always Been Crazy" (1978)	"Don't You Think This Outlaw Bit's Done Got Out of Hand" (1978)

"I've Always Been Crazy" is a song written and recorded by American country music artist Waylon Jennings. It was released in June 1978 as the first single and title track from his 1978 album I've Always Been Crazy. The song became his sixth number one on the country chart as a solo artist. The single stayed at number one for three weeks and spent a total of thirteen weeks on the chart.

== Single and album edits ==
The single version, released for radio airplay and commercial single release, cuts out an instrumental bridge in the middle of the song, and has an earlier fade. However, most radio stations that play "I've Always Been Crazy" as an oldie play the full album version.

== Chart performance ==
Chart (1978)	Peak position
US Hot Country Songs (Billboard)	1
Canadian RPM Country Tracks	1
