= Come with Me (Waylon Jennings song) =

Single by Waylon Jennings

from the album What Goes Around Comes Around
- B-side: "Mes'kin"
- Released: August 1979
- Recorded: January 1979
- Studio: American Studio, Nashville, Tennessee
- Genre: Country
- Length: 2:59
- Label: RCA
- Songwriter: Chuck Howard
- Producer: Richie Albright

Waylon Jennings singles chronology
"Amanda" (1979)	"Come with Me" (1979)	"I Ain't Living Long Like This" (1979)

"Come with Me" is a song written by Chuck Howard, and recorded by American country music artist Waylon Jennings. It was released in August 1979 as the first single from the album, What Goes Around Comes Around. The song was Jennings' eighth No. 1 on the Country chart as a solo artist. The single stayed at No. 1 for two weeks and spent a total of thirteen weeks on the Country chart.

== Charts ==
=== Weekly charts ===
Chart (1979)	Peak position
US Hot Country Songs (Billboard)	1
Canadian RPM Country Tracks	1

=== Year-end charts ===
Chart (1980)	Position
US Hot Country Songs (Billboard)	27
