= Lee Clayton =

American songwriter and musician (1942–2023)

- Born: Billy Shotts; October 29, 1942; Russellville, Alabama, U.S.
- Origin: Nashville, Tennessee, U.S.
- Died: June 12, 2023 (aged 80) White House, Tennessee, U.S.
- Genres: Country rock; outlaw country; progressive country
- Occupation(s): Singer, songwriter
- Years active: 1973–2018
- Website: leeclaytononline.com

Lee Clayton (born Billy Hugh Shotts; October 29, 1942 – June 12, 2023) was an American songwriter and musician. He notably wrote Waylon Jennings' 1972 outlaw country song "Ladies Love Outlaws".

== Biography ==
Clayton grew up in Oak Ridge, Tennessee and began to play harmonica and guitar at the age of seven. At nine years old, he received his first steel guitar.

After serving in the Air Force he moved to Nashville in 1968 and began his career as a songwriter. In 1972 he wrote "Ladies Love Outlaws" for Waylon Jennings. In 1973 he released his first album simply titled Lee Clayton, with which, as Clayton would later say, he was very dissatisfied. In the following years he continued his songwriting. He wrote songs like "Lone Wolf" for Jerry Jeff Walker and "If You Could Touch Her at All" also for Waylon Jennings. In 1978 his second album, Border Affair, was released. It was critically acclaimed but became a flop at the charts.

His most successful album was 1979's Naked Child. The songs' style was reminiscent of Bob Dylan and the single, "I Ride Alone", became very notable. In 1979, he went on a big world tour, which became a huge success. In 1981 he released his fourth studio album, The Dream Goes On, which had a harder sound than his previous work. After that he published two autobiographical books and, in 1990, he released a live album entitled Another Night, which was recorded on September 9, 1988, at the Cruise Cafe, Oslo, Norway. Also in 1990, The Highwaymen, an outlaw country supergroup comprising Johnny Cash, Waylon Jennings, Willie Nelson and Kris Kristofferson, had a minor hit with a song of his, "Silver Stallion", which had previously appeared on Border Affair (1978). In 1994, he released the album Spirit of the Twilight. Cat Power also covered "Silver Stallion" on the 2008 cover album Jukebox. In 2008 a new acoustic song "We The People" was 'released' on YouTube.

== Discography ==
- 1973: Lee Clayton, MCA
- 1978: Border Affair, Capitol
- 1979: Naked Child, Capitol
- 1981: The Dream Goes On, Capitol
- 1990: Tequila is Addictive (4 track CD maxi single), Provogue
- 1990: Another Night (live), Provogue
- 1994: Spirit of the Twilight, Provogue
- 2014: Live at Rockpalast (1980), Repertoire

== Compilations/reissues ==
- 1995: Border Affair/Naked Child 2^ & 3^ LP on CD Edsel Records UK
- 1996: Lee Clayton 1^ LP on CD Edsel Records UK
- 1996: Border Affair/Naked Child 2^ & 3^ LP on CD Edsel (edel)
- 2002: The Essential 1978–1981 Repertoire
- 2003: Border Affair/Naked Child 2^ & 3^ LP on CD
- 2005: The Essential 1978–1981 Smd Reper (Sony BMG)
- 2006: Lee Clayton 1^ LP on CD Evangeline (Soulfood Music)
- 2008: Border Affair-The Capitol Years 2^,3^ & 4^ LP on 2CD (Acadia/Evangeline)

== Chart songs as a songwriter ==
- #25 on Billboard: "Silver Stallion" played by The Highwaymen (Nelson/Jennings/Cash/Kristofferson) [1990]

== Notes ==
In the sleeve note of his album Another Night (1990) there's mention of U2's Bono saying that the only country singer that has influenced him was a pretty well unknown fellow named Lee Clayton.
