= I Ain't Living Long Like This =

1979 single by Waylon Jennings

"I Ain't Living Long Like This" is a song written by Rodney Crowell that was first recorded by Gary Stewart on his 1977 album Your Place or Mine (with Rodney Crowell and Nicolette Larson on backing vocals). Emmylou Harris then recorded the song for her 1978 album, Quarter Moon in a Ten Cent Town. Crowell released his version as well in 1978 on his debut album Ain't Living Long Like This.

== Waylon Jennings version ==
"I Ain't Living Long Like This"

Single by Waylon Jennings

from the album What Goes Around Comes Around
- B-side: "It's the World Gone Crazy (Cotillion)"
- Released: December 1979
- Recorded: June 20, 1979
- Studio: American Studio, Nashville, Tennessee
- Genre: Country rock, outlaw country, rock and roll
- Length: 4:44
- Label: RCA
- Songwriter: Rodney Crowell
- Producer: Richie Albright

Waylon Jennings singles chronology
"Come with Me" (1979)	"I Ain't Living Long Like This" (1979)	"Clyde" (1980)

- In 1979, Waylon Jennings recorded the song for his album What Goes Around Comes Around. His version was his eleventh number one on the country chart.

=== Chart performance ===
Chart (1979–1980)	Peak position
US Hot Country Songs (Billboard)	1
Canadian RPM Country Tracks	1

=== Year-end charts ===
Chart (1980)	Position
US Hot Country Songs (Billboard)	19

== Other recordings ==
- Brooks & Dunn
- Jerry Jeff Walker
- Andy Griggs
- Justin Moore
- Webb Wilder
- Albert Lee
- Chris Janson
- Foghat
- The Dream Syndicate
- Viagra Boys
- Session Americana
- Shannon McNally
