= Don't You Think This Outlaw Bit's Done Got Out of Hand =

Single by Waylon Jennings

from the album I've Always Been Crazy
- B-side: "Girl I Can Tell"
- Released: October 1978
- Genre: Country
- Length: 3:00
- Label: RCA
- Songwriter: Waylon Jennings
- Producers: Waylon Jennings; Richie Albright

Waylon Jennings singles chronology
"I've Always Been Crazy" (1978)	"Don't You Think This Outlaw Bit's Done Got Out of Hand" (1978)	"Amanda" (1979)

"Don't You Think This Outlaw Bit's Done Got Out of Hand" (posthumously released as "Outlaw Shit" in 2008) is a song written and recorded by American country music artist Waylon Jennings. It first released in October 1978 as the second single from his album I've Always Been Crazy. The song peaked at number 5 on the Billboard Hot Country Singles chart. It also reached number 1 on the RPM Country Tracks chart in Canada. Waylon redid the song specifically as well as several others in a session in the mid-1990s in a much slower and more regretful tone towards his previous actions dubbing it 'Outlaw Shit' and it would be released on the 2008 album Waylon Forever, Waylon's first posthumous studio album release.

== Content ==
The song is based on Jennings's own longstanding drug habit, which culminated in a 1977 arrest on federal drug charges in which a package from New York City was traced to a studio in Nashville, Tennessee where Waylon was recording. DEA agents busted down the door to find longtime drummer for Jennings and co-producer for the album Richie Albright at the control board and immediately questioned him. Albright put his hand on the talkback button of the control board to let Jennings hear what was happening. Jennings hid the package, then examined the arrest warrant which was faulty, with the wrong owner listed. With the agents distracted, Albright flushed the cocaine down a toilet. The lyrics (and song title) surmise that Jennings's involvement in the outlaw country movement had instigated the raid, a movement that he felt had outgrown its original intentions by becoming so commercially successful.

Jennings reworked the song in the mid-1990s in a session that would later be handed to producer Dave Cobb along with his youngest son Shooter Jennings and his backing band the .357's to produce after Waylon's death in 2002. This version with slight lyrical changes and a slower tempo was released as "Outlaw Shit" on the 2008 album Waylon Forever, Waylon's first posthumous album.

== Chart performance ==
Chart (1978–1979)	Peak position
US Hot Country Songs (Billboard)	5
Canadian RPM Country Tracks	1

== Cover versions ==
Waylon's son Shooter Jennings performed a cover of this song on CMT Crossroads as a duet with Jamey Johnson.

On the tribute album I've Always Been Crazy: Tribute to Waylon Jennings, the song was covered by Metallica frontman James Hetfield.

Ben Hoffman, performing as Wheeler Walker Jr., performed a cover on the podcast "Your Mom's House".
