= The Highwaymen =

American country music supergroup (1985–1996)

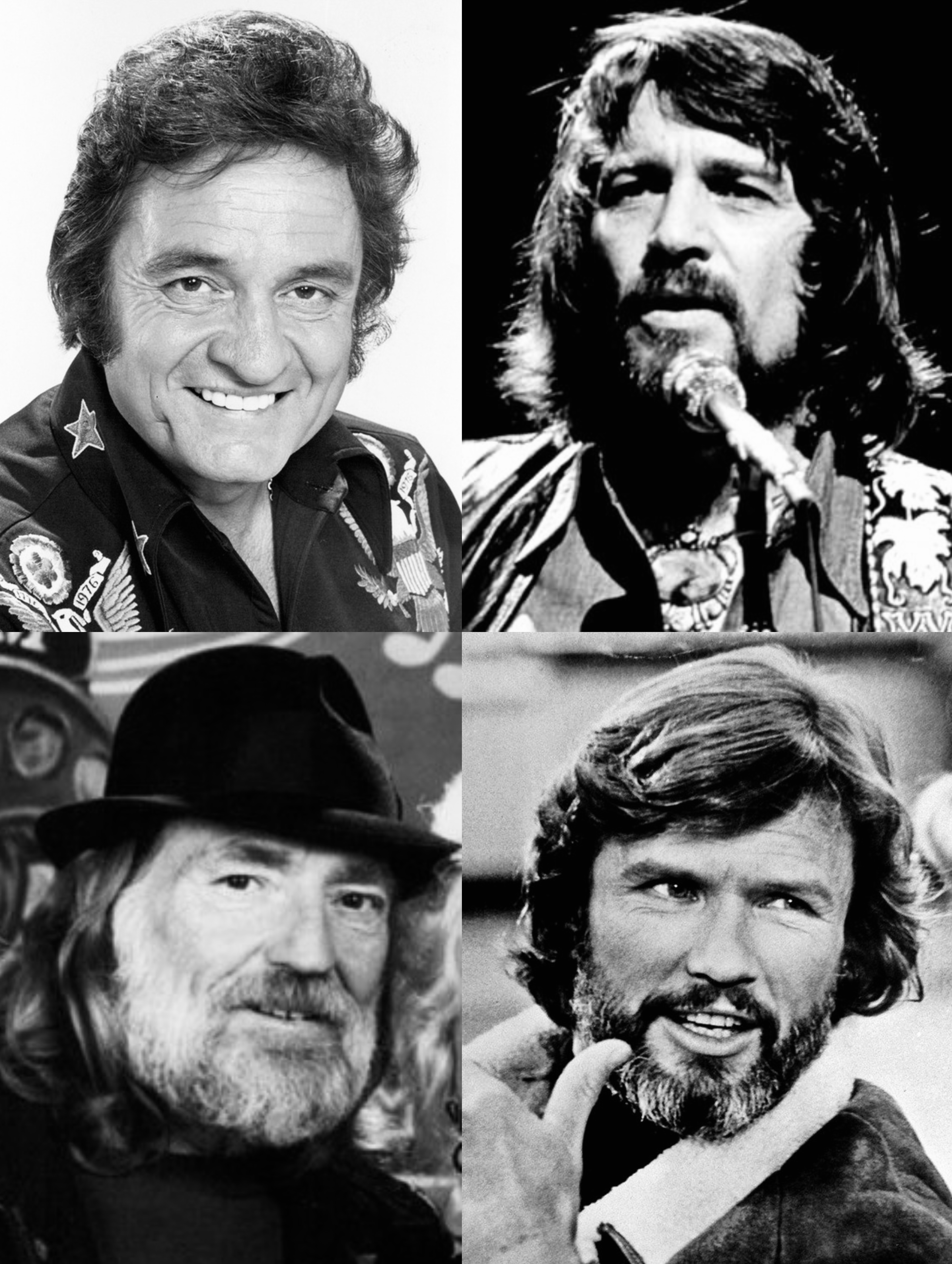
- Clockwise from top left: Johnny Cash (1977), Waylon Jennings (1976), Kris Kristofferson (1978), and Willie Nelson (1978).

Background information
- Also known as: Nelson, Jennings, Cash, Kristofferson
- Origin: United States
- Genre: Country
- Years active: 1985–1996
- Labels: Columbia; Liberty
- Past members: Johnny Cash; Waylon Jennings; Kris Kristofferson; Willie Nelson

The Highwaymen were an American supergroup of country music artists. The group consisted of Johnny Cash, Waylon Jennings, Willie Nelson, and Kris Kristofferson. Between 1985 and 1995, they recorded three major label albums as the Highwaymen: two on Columbia Records and one for Liberty Records. Their Columbia works produced three chart singles, including the number one "Highwayman" in 1985.

One other vocal artist appeared on a Highwaymen recording: Johnny Rodriguez, who provided Spanish vocal on "Deportee", a Woody Guthrie composition, from the album Highwayman. The four starred together in the 1986 film Stagecoach.

Glen Campbell, who recorded the song in 1978 as part of his 1979 album Highwayman, did not appear on any recording but temporarily joined the supergroup in a 1985 live performance at the first Farm Aid concert in Kristofferson's absence. Campbell was also a friend to each individual member, and played in early sessions with them.

In 1990, the original members of the 1950s-'60s folk group of the same name sued the Highwaymen over their use of the name, which was inspired by a Jimmy Webb ballad the country stars had recorded. The suit was dropped when all parties agreed that the folk group owned the name but that the earlier group would grant a nonexclusive, nontransferable license to the supergroup to use the name. The two groups shared the stage at a 1990 concert in Hollywood.

== Albums ==
=== Highwayman ===
Formed in 1985, the group did not have an official name when they released their first two albums on Columbia Records. The first album, Highwayman, was credited to "Nelson, Jennings, Cash, Kristofferson". The single "Highwayman", a Jimmy Webb composition, became a #1 country hit. Their cover of Guy Clark's "Desperados Waiting for a Train" reached the Top 20. The album was produced by Chips Moman.

=== Highwayman 2 ===
In 1990, the four members reunited for a second effort, titled Highwayman 2, which reached #4 on the country album chart. The Lee Clayton-penned song "Silver Stallion" was the first single and made the country Top 40. The album was nominated for a Grammy for Best Country Vocal Collaboration. Highwayman 2 was produced, once again, by Moman. Six of the songs were written or co-written by members of the group.

=== The Road Goes on Forever ===
The group's final release (now listed as "Highwaymen") prior to Jennings's death in 2002 was 1995's Don Was-produced album The Road Goes on Forever, (a Robert Earl Keen cover), with the single, "It Is What It Is". A tenth-anniversary edition of The Road Goes on Forever appeared in 2005, with several bonus tracks added as well as, in some versions, a DVD containing the video for "It Is What It Is" and a documentary titled Live Forever – In the Studio with the Highwaymen.

=== Final years: Breakup, aftermath, and occasional partial reunions ===
The band continued to tour into the late 1990s, before Jennings and Cash both started to decline in health, which prevented them from maintaining a full touring schedule. All four continued to perform as solo artists, with Jennings briefly joining another country supergroup, Old Dogs; Jennings died in 2002, and Cash died in 2003.

Nelson and Kristofferson collaborated on multiple occasions following the deaths of Jennings and Cash, but they were not credited as the Highwaymen for these occasions. For example, in November 2003, Nelson and Kristofferson reunited to perform "Big River", one of Cash's songs that he had re-recorded in 1985 with his Highwaymen bandmates, with George Jones at a Grand Ole Opry-sponsored memorial concert for Cash at the Ryman Auditorium in Nashville, Tennessee.

"Those tours and the records we made were a great time," recalled Kristofferson in 2010. "I just wish I was more aware of how lucky I was to share a stage with those people. I had no idea that two of them would be done so soon. Hell, I was up there and I had all my heroes with me. These are guys whose ashtrays I used to clean. I'm kinda amazed I wasn't more amazed."

In 2012, Kristofferson, Jamey Johnson, and Snoop Dogg collaborated with Nelson on the single "Roll Me Up and Smoke Me When I Die".

In 2016, Nelson and Kristofferson recorded a virtual collaboration of "One Too Many Mornings", featuring archived vocals by Cash and Jennings recorded during the 1980s. This was released as a bonus track on the 2016 live album "Live: American Outlaws", recorded at Nassau Coliseum in 1990.

Kristofferson died on September 28, 2024, leaving Nelson as the last living member of the Highwaymen.

== Discography ==
=== Studio albums ===
Title	Album details	Peak chart positions						Certifications (sales threshold)
Title	Album details	US Country	US	AUS	CAN Country	DEN	NOR	Certifications (sales threshold)
Highwayman	Release date: May 6, 1985; Label: Columbia Records	1	92	23	—	—	—	AUS: Platinum; US: Platinum; CAN: Gold
Highwayman 2	Release date: February 9, 1990; Label: Columbia Records	4	79	9	—	—	—	AUS: Platinum
The Road Goes On Forever	Release date: April 4, 1995; Label: Liberty Records	42	—	46	10	8	11	
"—" denotes releases that did not chart

=== Compilation albums ===
Title	Album details	Peak positions		Sales
Title	Album details	US Country	AUS	Sales
The Highwaymen Ride Again (Import Only – Greece & Netherlands)	Release date: June 11, 1995; Label: Columbia Records	—	—	
Highwayman Super Hits	Release date: March 2, 1999; Label: Columbia Records	—	—	
Country Legends	Release date: 2005; Label: DeLuxe Holland	—	—	
The Essential Highwaymen	Release date: October 26, 2010; Label: Columbia Records	—	—	
Live: American Outlaws	Release date: May 20, 2016; Label: Legacy Recordings	16	89	US: 12,500
The Very Best of the Highwaymen	Release date: May 20, 2016; Label: Legacy Recordings	22	—	US: 48,900
"—" denotes releases that did not chart

=== Singles ===
Year	Single	Peak chart positions				Certifications	Album
Year	Single	US Country	AUS	CAN Country	CAN AC	Certifications	Album
1985	"Highwayman"	1	98	1	19	BPI: Silver; RMNZ: Gold	Highwayman
1985	"Desperados Waiting for a Train"	15	—	20	—		Highwayman
1990	"Silver Stallion"	25	123	21	—		Highwayman 2
1990	"Born and Raised in Black and White"	—^{A}	—	—	—		Highwayman 2
1990	"American Remains"	—	—	—	—		Highwayman 2
1995	"It Is What It Is"	—	—	—	—		The Road Goes on Forever
2005	"If He Came Back Again"	—	—	—	—		The Road Goes on Forever (re-issue)
"—" denotes releases that did not chart

Notes

- ^{A} "Born and Raised in Black and White" did not chart on Hot Country Songs, but peaked at No. 1 on Hot Country Radio Breakouts.

== Videography ==
=== Music videos ===
Year	Title	Director
1985	"Highwayman"	Peter Israelson
1990	"Silver Stallion"	Jon Small
1995	"It Is What It Is"	Lowe/Don Was
2016	"Good Hearted Woman"	Jon Small

=== Video albums ===
Year	Title	Details	Certification
1991	Highwaymen Live!	filmed in 1990 at the Nassau Coliseum	AUS: 10× Platinum
1993	On the Road Again	filmed in 1992 in Aberdeen, Scotland	
2016	The Highwaymen Live at The Nassau Coliseum	filmed in 1990 at the Nassau Coliseum An extended re-edit of Highwaymen Live!	AUS: Gold
