= Jessi Colter discography =

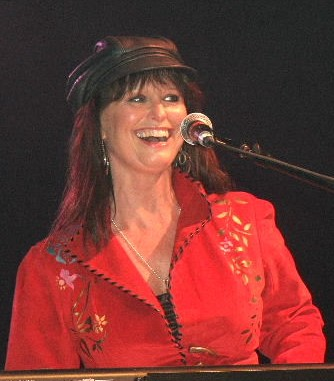
- Colter performing at the South by Southwest festival (2006)
- Studio albums: 13
- Compilation albums: 3
- Singles: 27
- Other album appearances: 17
- Other charted songs: 1

The discography of American country singer Jessi Colter consists of 13 studio albums, three compilation albums, 27 singles, 17 other album appearances, and one other charted song. Under her birth name Mirriam Johnson, she recorded two singles in 1961. Her first releases under the name Jessi Colter were issued by RCA Victor in 1969, beginning with A Country Star Is Born. The label also released several singles through 1972. Colter first had commercial success with the 1975 single "I'm Not Lisa". It topped the US country chart, reached number four on the US Hot 100 and number 16 on the US adult contemporary chart. It made similar positions in Canada, while also making multiple charts internationally. It was featured on the studio album I'm Jessi Colter. Released by Capitol Records, the album reached number four on the US country albums chart and number 50 on the US Billboard 200. The disc spawned the top five US country single "What's Happened to Blue Eyes".

In 1976, Colter was one of several country artists featured on the platinum-selling compilation Wanted! The Outlaws. A re-release of the Waylon Jennings and Colter single "Suspicious Minds" reached number two on the US and Canadian country charts. Colter's third studio album Jessi was issued in 1976. It also reached number four on the US country chart, while peaking at number 109 on the Billboard 200. The lead single "It's Morning (And I Still Love You)" reached the US and Canadian country top 20. Her fourth album Diamond in the Rough reached the top five of the US country chart and number 79 on the Billboard 200. Its only single "I Thought I Heard You Calling My Name" reached the US country top 30.

Colter's next several solo singles failed to reach positions inside the country top 40. Yet Capitol Records released three more solo studio albums of Colter's material: Mirriam (1977), That's the Way a Cowboy Rocks and Rolls (1978) and Ridin' Shotgun (1981). Colter also collaborated with Waylon Jennings on the 1981 album Leather and Lace. The album certified gold in the United States and Canada. It was Colter's third highest-charting album, reaching number 11 on the US country chart and number 43 on the US Billboard 200. In 1984, the Triad label issued her next solo album titled Rock and Roll Lullaby. Ten years later, an album of children's music appeared titled Jessi Colter Sings Just for Kids. In 2006, Colter appeared again with the solo album Out of the Ashes, which reached number 61 on the US country chart. In 2017, Legacy issued the album titled The Psalms. In 2023, Colter released her next solo effort titled Edge of Forever.

== Albums ==
=== Studio albums ===
List of albums, with selected chart positions and certifications, showing other relevant details
Title	Album details	Peak chart positions			Certifications
Title	Album details	US	US Cou.	CAN	Certifications
A Country Star Is Born	Released: April 1970; Label: RCA Victor; Formats: LP	—	—	—	
I'm Jessi Colter	Released: January 1975; Label: Capitol; Formats: LP, cassette	50	4	—	
Jessi	Released: January 1976; Label: Capitol; Formats: LP, cassette	109	4	87	
Diamond in the Rough	Released: July 1976; Label: Capitol; Formats: LP, cassette	79	4	64	
Mirriam	Released: July 1977; Label: Capitol; Formats: LP, cassette	—	29	—	
That's the Way a Cowboy Rocks and Rolls	Released: November 1978; Label: Capitol; Formats: LP, cassette	—	46	—	
Leather and Lace (with Waylon Jennings)	Released: February 1981; Label: RCA; Formats: LP, cassette	43	11	—	MC: Gold; RIAA: Gold
Ridin' Shotgun	Released: December 1981; Label: Capitol; Formats: LP, cassette	—	—	—	
Rock and Roll Lullaby	Released: 1984; Label: Triad; Formats: LP, cassette	—	—	—	
Jessi Colter Sings Just for Kids: Songs from Around the World	Released: January 1, 1996; Label: Peter Pan; Formats: Cassette, CD	—	—	—	
Out of the Ashes	Released: February 28, 2006; Label: Shout! Factory; Formats: CD, music download	—	61	—	
The Psalms	Released: March 24, 2017; Label: Legacy; Formats: CD, music download	—	—	—	
Edge of Forever	Released: October 27, 2023; Label: Appalachia; Formats: CD, music download	—	—	—	
"—" denotes a recording that did not chart or was not released in that territory.

=== Compilation albums ===
List of albums, with selected chart positions and certifications, showing other relevant details
Title	Album details	Peak chart positions			Certifications
Title	Album details	US	US Cou.	CAN	Certifications
Wanted! The Outlaws (with Tompall Glaser, Waylon Jennings, and Willie Nelson)	Released: January 12, 1976; Label: RCA Victor; Formats: Vinyl, cassette	10	1	59	MC: Platinum; RIAA: 2× Platinum
The Jessi Colter Collection	Released: April 4, 1995; Label: Liberty; Formats: CD, cassette	—	—	—	
The Very Best of Jessi Colter: An Outlaw...a Lady	Released: September 2, 2003; Label: Capitol Nashville; Formats: CD, music download	—	—	—	
"—" denotes a recording that did not chart or was not released in that territory.

== Singles ==
=== As lead artist ===
List of singles, with selected chart positions, showing other relevant details
Title	Year	Peak chart positions									Album
Title	Year	US	US AC	US Cou.	AUS	CAN	CAN AC	CAN Cou.	AUT	NZ	Album
"Lonesome Road" (Note: credited under Colter's birth name "Mirriam Johnson".)	1961	—	—	—	—	—	—	—	—	—	—N/a
"I Think I Cried Long Enough Over You" (Note: credited under Colter's birth name "Mirriam Johnson".)	1961	—	—	—	—	—	—	—	—	—	—N/a
"I Ain't the One" (with Waylon Jennings)	1969	—	—	—	—	—	—	—	—	—	A Country Star Is Born
"Cry Softly"	1970	—	—	—	—	—	—	—	—	—	A Country Star Is Born
"You Mean to Say"	1971	—	—	—	—	—	—	—	—	—	—N/a
"I Don't Want to Be a One Night Stand"	1972	—	—	—	—	—	—	—	—	—	—N/a
"I'm Not Lisa"	1975	4	16	1	31	1	6	1	17	17	I'm Jessi Colter
"What's Happened to Blue Eyes"	1975	57	—	5	—	—	—	11	—	—	I'm Jessi Colter
"It's Morning (And I Still Love You)"	1975	—	—	11	—	—	—	20	—	—	Jessi
"Without You"	1976	—	—	50	—	—	—	38	—	—	Jessi
"I Thought I Heard You Calling My Name"	1976	—	—	29	—	—	—	48	—	—	Diamond in the Rough
"I Belong to Him"	1977	—	—	—	—	—	—	—	—	—	Mirriam
"Maybe You Should've Been Listening"	1978	—	—	45	—	—	—	61	—	—	That's the Way a Cowboy; Rocks and Rolls
"Love Me Back to Sleep"	1979	—	—	91	—	—	—	—	—	—	That's the Way a Cowboy; Rocks and Rolls
"Bittersweet Love"	1981	—	—	—	—	—	—	—	—	—	—N/a
"Holdin' On"	1981	—	—	70	—	—	—	—	—	—	Ridin' Shotgun
"Ain't Makin' No Headlines"	1982	—	—	—	—	—	—	—	—	—	Ridin' Shotgun
"Ridin' Shotgun"	1982	—	—	—	—	—	—	—	—	—	Ridin' Shotgun
"I Want to Be With You"	1984	—	—	—	—	—	—	—	—	—	Rock and Roll Lullaby
"Psalm 136: Mercy and Loving Kindness"	2017	—	—	—	—	—	—	—	—	—	The Psalms
"Standing on the Edge of Forever"	2023	—	—	—	—	—	—	—	—	—	Edge of Forever
"—" denotes a recording that did not chart or was not released in that territory.

=== As a collaborative and featured artist ===
List of singles, with selected chart positions, showing other relevant details
Title	Year	Peak chart positions		Album
Title	Year	US Cou.	CAN Cou.	Album
"Guitar on My Mind" (as Duane & Miriam Eddy)	1967	—	—	—N/a
"Suspicious Minds" (with Waylon Jennings)	1970	25	—	—N/a
"Under Your Spell Again" (Waylon Jennings with Jessi Colter)	1971	39	—	Ladies Love Outlaws
"Suspicious Minds" (re-release) (with Waylon Jennings)	1976	2	2	Wanted! The Outlaws
"Storms Never Last" (as Waylon & Jessi)	1981	17	11	Leather and Lace
"Wild Side of Life"/"It Wasn't God Who Made Honky Tonk Angels" (as Waylon & Jessi)	1981	10	6	Leather and Lace
"Deep in the West" (Waylon Jennings with Jessi Colter)	1996	—	—	Right for the Time
"Storms Never Last" (with Kristi Dee)	2011	—	—	—N/a
"—" denotes a recording that did not chart or was not released in that territory.

== Other charted songs ==
List of songs, with selected chart positions, showing other relevant details
Title	Year	Peak chart positions		Album	Notes
Title	Year	US	CAN	Album	Notes
"You Ain't Never Been Loved (Like I'm Gonna Love You)"	1975	64	65	I'm Jessi Colter	(Note: B-side to the single "What's Happened to Blue Eyes".)

== Other appearances ==
List of non-single guest appearances, with other performing artists, showing year released and album name
Title	Year	Other artist(s)	Album	Ref.
"Story to Tell (Preface)"	1978	none	White Mansions	
"Last Dance and the Kentucky Racehorse"	1978	John Dillon	White Mansions	
"The Old Rugged Cross"	1987	Johnny Cash	Country Sings Great Gospel	
"The Carpenter"	2000	Randy Travis; Waylon Jennings	Inspirational Journey	
"I'm Not Lisa"	2000	none	Never Say Die: Live	
"Storms Never Last"	2000	Waylon Jennings	Never Say Die: Live	
"Wild Wolf Calling Me"	2004	Tony Joe White; Emmylou Harris	The Heroines	
"Southern Comfort"	2005	Shooter Jennings; Faith Evans; CeCe White	Put the "O" Back in Country	
"The Captive"	2006	Vince Haines	The Pilgrim: A Celebration	
"Looking for Someone"	2007	Ted Russell Kamp	Divisadero	
"I'm Not Lisa"	2007	Deana Carter	The Chain	
"Good Hearted Woman"	2011	Sunny Sweeney	The Music Inside: A Collaboration Dedicated to Waylon Jennings, Vol. 1	
"Great Judgment Morning"	2013	George Jones; Waylon Jennings; Ricky Skaggs; Connie Smith; Marty Stuart	Amazing Grace	
"We're Still Hangin' In There Ain't We Jessi"	2017	Jeannie Seely; Jan Howard	Written In Song	
"Invitation to the Blues"	2018	Shooter Jennings	King of the Road: A Tribute to Roger Miller	
"Just a Woman"	2020	Jaime Wyatt	Neon Cross	
"Out Among the Stars"	2021	Shannon McNally	The Waylon Sessions	
