= Waylon Jennings' 1977 arrest =

Drug bust involving Waylon Jennings in August 1977

- Federal arrest warrant issued for Waylon Jennings on August 23, 1977 by the United States District Court.
- Date: August 23, 1977
- Time: 7:40p.m. EST
- Location: American Studios 1111 17th Avenue South Nashville, Tennessee, U.S.; 36.144056°N 86.794661°W
- Also known as: United States of America v. Waylon Jennings
- Cause: Cocaine found in package that was flagged and intercepted by the DEA
- First reporter: The Tennessean
- Filmed by: Richie Albright
- Participants: Bernie Redd; Bill Rosenburger; William C. Tucker
- Suspects: Initially Charged: Waylon Jennings; Lori Evans; Mark Rothbaum; Later Charged: Richie Albright
- Charges: Initial Charges: Possession of cocaine and conspiracy with intent to distribute Later Charges: Simple assault via a Coca-Cola can
- Verdict: Initial charges dismissed against Waylon Jennings and Lori Evans, later charges dismissed against Richie Albright; Mark Rothbaum sentenced to 18 months in a minimum security prison

On August 23, 1977, Waylon Jennings, his secretary Lori Evans, as well as Mark Rothbaum were arrested in Nashville, Tennessee, at American Studios for possession of cocaine and conspiracy with intent to distribute. The raid happened after Drug Enforcement Administration (DEA) agents tracked down a package containing 27 grams of cocaine which was flown in from New York City's John F. Kennedy International Airport on Braniff Airlines, Flight 119.

== Background ==
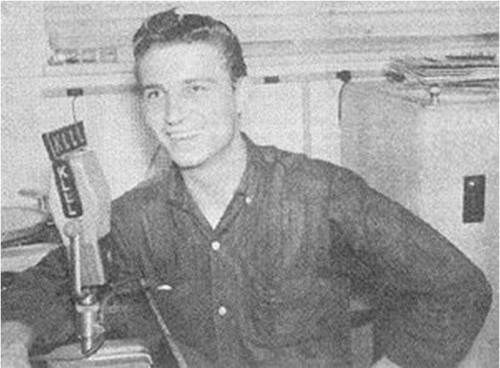
Jennings in 1958 and 1988

Jennings had long struggled with drug addiction prior to the arrest. He would start using them while performing in Phoenix, Arizona in the early 1960s, taking uppers and downers, a pattern that would continue well into his move to Nashville in 1965. In the 1970s he would quit consuming pills, and started consuming cocaine on a daily basis, regularly spending $1,500 a day on the drug.

== Raid ==
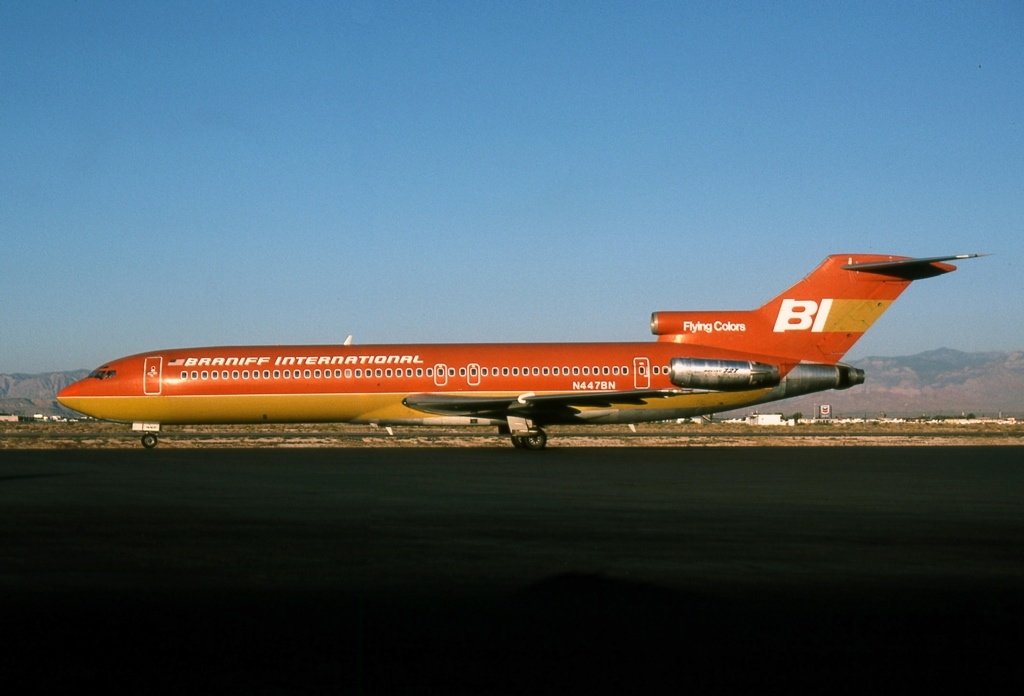
A Boeing 727, in use by Braniff Airlines around the time of the raid.

In the summer of 1977, Jennings was attempting to raise funds for a trip to Jamaica for a young fan who had been diagnosed with brain cancer. According to Jennings' eldest son, Terry, Waylon became angry after his manager Neil Reshen's associate, Mark Rothbaum, mishandled the travel arrangements. Rothbaum then sent 27 grams of cocaine to Jennings at American Studios as a means of attempting to make a reconciliation in August.

On August 23, 1977, the shipment was intercepted by the DEA after a tip from a worker, Danny Byriter, at World Courier Service Inc. handling the package's delivery. After the discovery, it was then marked and tracked as it went along, with all but 2 grams of the cocaine removed by the agency.

The former American Studios in June 2025

Jennings' secretary Lori Evans intercepted the package at Nashville International Airport at 7:40 p.m. EST. The package had just flown in from the John F. Kennedy International Airport on Braniff Airlines, Flight 119. She then brought it to Jennings at American Studios in Nashville, Tennessee where he was recording backing vocals for "Storms Never Last" for Hank Williams Jr.'s album The New South.

Mixing console at American Studios pictured in 1989.

Richie Albright, Jennings' longtime drummer, was at the mixing console when DEA Special Agent, Bernie Redd and other agents busted into the control room. As Albright was being questioned, he pushed his hand down on the talkback button, and Jennings was then able to hear what was said. Albright convinced the agents to let them finish the session, as it was costing them $250 an hour to be there. He would go into the booth with Jennings, pretending to adjust his microphone. Jennings then kicked the cocaine behind a baseboard, out of sight, and Albright would stuff the package down his pants. George Leib, Waylon's booking agent, drunkenly walked in and started to argue with the agents. While they were distracted by Leib, Albright walked out and flushed the cocaine down a toilet in the studio. Agents heard the flushing but were only able to retrieve two soaking-wet plastic bags containing minuscule traces of the substance.

During the argument, Jennings inspected the search warrant they had. He noticed they incorrectly listed him as the studio owner, as the actual owner of the studio was Chips Moman. The warrant actually only allowed them to search his office that was directly next door, at 1117 17th Avenue South. Subsequently, Jennings demanded that they obtain a new warrant. While they waited on the search warrant, one agent directly asked Jennings "where is it?" to which Jennings replied "if it ever was here, it ain’t here no more." The agent then sarcastically responded, "I’ll bet it ain’t."

== Arrests & legal proceedings ==
Waylon Jennings, Lori Evans, and Mark Rothbaum entering a Nashville federal courthouse on August 31, 1977.

Jennings, Evans, and Rothbaum were all briefly arrested on charges of conspiracy to possess cocaine. Prior to getting arrested, Jennings phoned his wife Jessi Colter telling her to flush any and all drugs that was on or in his belongings, as well as anything else that looked suspicious. He would later temporarily move out of his house, living exclusively in hotel rooms, in fear that he and his belongings had been wired somehow. The charges against Evans were dropped almost immediately, by U.S. Magistrate Kent Sandidge III, the judge presiding over the case at the time.

On August 25, Richie Albright was charged in the case as well after WTVF photographer, Harold Rowe, was struck in the head by Albright with a Coca-Cola can while trying to document the case at the courthouse.

Jennings walks into a Nashville courtroom on August 31, 1977 whilst swarmed by reporters and media.

On October 4 of that year, prosecutors asked Judge Leland Clure Morton to dismiss the charges against Jennings and Albright, with the charges against Evans already dropped back in August. The charges were finally dismissed without prejudice due to the case exceeding the 45-day limit set by the Speedy Trial Act.

Clipping from May 4, 1978 edition of Austin American-Statesman detailing Rothbaum's arrest.

Mark Rothbaum entered into a guilty plea in May 1978 and was sentenced to 18 months in a minimum security prison for sending the package to Jennings.

== Aftermath ==
Jennings and Nelson performing at the Nashville Municipal Auditorium on August 24, 1977

The night after the group was arrested, Waylon took to the stage at the Nashville Municipal Auditorium in downtown Nashville alongside Willie Nelson and Emmylou Harris in front of a crowd of 10,000 strong. He would perform his hit Luckenbach, Texas exclaiming in the first verse, "I don't want my name in the marquee lights. Or the newspaper either."

After Jennings was released from jail on a $7,500 bond, he would write the latter part to what would become, "Don't You Think This Outlaw Bit's Done Got Out of Hand" the day after the arrest. Jennings' lawyer Jay Goldberg, during the trial, would try to convince him not to record the song and get rid of all evidence of its existence, as it was deemed self-incriminating, but he had proof he had already written most of the song beforehand, therefore it was not admissible in a court of law. The song would peak at No. 5 on the Billboard Hot Country Singles Charts on December 9, 1978.

Hank Williams Jr. revealed in an interview with Chet Flippo on March 3, 1978, at The Palomino Club, that the entire raid was recorded onto tape, as the tape never stopped rolling during any part of the raid whilst Jennings was in the booth. He revealed that it was in possession of disc jockey Hugh Cherry, and that he and others had listened to it. To this day, the tape has never been released to the public. The tape's current whereabouts are unknown, with Waylon's youngest son, Shooter Jennings, still actively seeking it out.

After Rothbaum's release from prison, Willie Nelson fired Reshen, and Rothbaum became Willie's manager due to taking the fall for the bust.

== Media coverage ==
Roger Mudd reporting on the arrest on the CBS Evening News on August 24, 1977

The arrest received extensive media coverage, with Jennings at his peak of commercial success at the time of the raid, only 4 months removed from the release of Luckenbach, Texas, which was the highest-charting song of Jennings' over 50-year career. Outlets that reported on the arrest included The New York Times, The Los Angeles Times, The Tennessean, Austin American-Statesman, and The Atlanta Journal, among other notable outlets.

== Cultural impact ==
Clipping detailing Jennings' arrest in The Tennessean on September 6, 1977.

The incident had a major domino effect on the trajectory of country music as a whole, turning Jennings' tongue-in-cheek "outlaw" image into a real-life issue. Historian Michael Streissguth later described in 2013 that Jennings' 1977 arrest was the movement's "death knell," arguing that its excesses had begun to overshadow its original message of artistic independence. Although Jennings continued to enjoy commercial success, in the following years, the outlaw movement was overtaken in the mainstream by the Urban Cowboy movement by the start of the 1980s.

The arrest would also become one of the defining moments of Jennings' career, further bolstering his image as an "outlaw" in the mainstream landscape of country music. Jennings himself later cited the incident as one of the reasons, among many others, for overcoming his longstanding drug addiction in April 1984 in Phoenix, Arizona.

== In popular culture ==
On July 17, 2012, Bill Conrad, Waylon's former publicist, discussed the arrest at length in the sixth and final installment of a six-part series on Jennings for No Depression. At the time of the incident, Conrad was only about 50 feet away in Jennings' office, located adjacent to the studio for which the initial search warrant was issued, and would provide a firsthand account of the events.

The arrest was discussed in detail in season 1, episode 7 of Tales From the Tour Bus, the second of a two-part series on Jennings' life. The episode and segment on the bust included accounts on the bust from Richie Albright, Gordon "Crank" Payne, and Tom Bourke.

Waylon and company's arrest was detailed at great length in the "Outlaws & Armadillo's" exhibit at the Country Music Hall of Fame from May 25, 2018, to February 15, 2021.

== See also ==
- The Lovin' Spoonful's drug bust (1966)
- The Rolling Stones' Redlands bust (1967)
- Trial of Jimi Hendrix (1969)
