= Richie Albright =

American country musician

- Albright at KERA-TV Studios on August 24, 1975

Background information
- Also known as: Short Stroke
- Born: July 10, 1939; Bradley, Oklahoma, U.S.
- Origin: Bagdad, Arizona
- Died: February 9, 2021 (aged 81) Leipers Fork, Tennessee, U.S.
- Genre: Country
- Occupations: Drummer, producer, songwriter
- Instrument: Drums
- Years active: 1956-2021
- Formerly of: The Waylors

Richard Dale "Richie" Albright (July 10, 1939 – February 9, 2021) was an American drummer, producer, and songwriter. He was the original and longest tenured drummer in Waylon Jennings' band, The Waylors.

Born in Bradley, Oklahoma and raised in Bagdad, Arizona, Albright became a key figure in the country music scene alongside Waylon Jennings having played in The Waylors since the start of their residency at JD's in 1964 up until his death in 2021.

== Career ==
=== Early career ===
Albright began playing drums as a teenager with his first paid performance being his high school prom in 1956. After playing around Arizona for years, he met Waylon Jennings in Phoenix, Arizona, and joined Jennings' backing band, The Waylors, in 1964. Albright became the drummer for the group, and performed weekly with the group during its residency at J.D.'s Nightclub in Tempe, Arizona.

In 1965, Albright with the group moved to Nashville, Tennessee, where he would continue as Jennings' drummer for live performances due to RCA refusing to let The Waylors play in the vast majority of studio sessions.

=== Outlaw era ===
In 1973, he aided Jennings in gaining complete creative freedom telling him "there's another of way of doing things and that is rock and roll". After that Jennings along with new found manager Neil Reshen would aide Waylon in getting a new contract from the company. The contract gave Waylon full creative freedom over his music, something virtually unheard of in the genre prior. Subsequently, he started appearing on many Jennings albums as a studio musician and became his "right hand man" as he was affectionately known. Albright also would record with artists such as Willie Nelson, Jessi Colter, Tompall Glaser, Johnny Cash, Tony Joe White, David Lynn Jones, Johnny Rodriguez, and Billy Joe Shaver.

Albright began working as a record producer in addition to his performing with Jennings. He and Jennings co-produced Jessi Colter's 1977 album Mirriam, his debut album as a producer. Following that Albright became increasingly involved in producing Jennings' and others recordings.

Albright would also work briefly as a songwriter. He co-wrote "The Conversation" with Jennings and Hank Williams Jr., which was first recorded by Williams on his 1979 album Whiskey Bent and Hell Bound and later released as a single by Jennings in 1983 on his album Waylon and Company.

=== Later career ===
As the 1980s rolled around, Jennings would sign with MCA Records, ending a 20-year long run with RCA. After this, Albright would leave the band with Jeff Hale coming in as drummer, and Jennings starting experimenting with new producers. He returned to producing for Waylon in 1990 after a 6-year absence on the album The Eagle. He would play occasionally with the band once again up until Jennings' death in February 2002.

Following Jennings' death, Albright continued performing with Waymore's Outlaws and would remain active with the group until his death in February 2021.

== Death ==
Albright would pass away on his farm in Leiper's Fork, Tennessee on February 9, 2021, at the age of 81.

== Discography ==
=== Production discography ===
==== Albums ====
- Willie - Before His Time — Willie Nelson (1977)
- Mirriam — Jessi Colter (1977)
- The New South — Hank Williams Jr. (1977)
- Gordon Payne — Gordon Payne (1978)
- What Goes Around Comes Around — Waylon Jennings (1979)
- That's the Way a Cowboy Rocks and Rolls — Jessi Colter (1979)
- Music Man — Waylon Jennings (1980)
- Leather and Lace — Waylon Jennings and Jessi Colter (1981)
- Billy Joe Shaver — Billy Joe Shaver (1982)
- For Every Rose — Johnny Rodriguez (1983)
- Sweet Mother Texas — Waylon Jennings (1986)
- Hard Times on Easy Street — David Lynn Jones (1987)
- The Eagle — Waylon Jennings (1990)
- Too Dumb for New York City, Too Ugly for L.A. — Waylon Jennings (1992)
- Songbird — Waylon Jennings (2025)
- Diamonds — Waylon Jennings (2026)

==== Singles ====
- I've Always Been Crazy / I Never Said It Would Be Easy — Waylon Jennings (1978)
- Don't You Think This Outlaw Bit's Done Got Out of Hand / Girl I Can Tell — Waylon Jennings (1978)
- I Ain't Living Long Like This / It's the World Gone Crazy (Cotillion) — Waylon Jennings (1979)
- Come with Me / Mes'kin — Waylon Jennings (1979)
- Theme from The Dukes of Hazzard (Good Ol' Boys) / It's Alright — Waylon Jennings (1980)
- Storms Never Last / I Ain't The One — Waylon Jennings (1980)
- The Wild Side of Life / It Wasn't God Who Made Honky Tonk Angels — Waylon Jennings and Jessi Colter
- The Blues Around Town / After Dinner And Wine — Marcia Beverly (1982)
- Wanted: All Outlaws / You Ain't Never Been Loved — Marcia Beverly (1982)
- The Conversation / Fancy Free — Waylon Jennings and Hank Williams Jr. (1983)

=== Songwriting credits ===
- The Conversation — Waylon Jennings and Hank Williams Jr. (1983)
- Breaking Away — Tammy Wynette (1985)
