= Never Say Die: Live =

2000 live album by Waylon Jennings

Live album by Waylon Jennings
- Released: October 10, 2000
- Recorded: January 5–6, 2000
- Genres: Country; outlaw country
- Length: 1:40:00
- Label: Columbia
- Producers: Blake Chancey; Waylon Jennings

Waylon Jennings chronology
The Millennium Collection: The Best of Waylon Jennings (2000)	Never Say Die: Live (2000)	RCA Country Legends (2001)

Waylon Jennings live album chronology
The Restless Kid: Live at JD's (2000)	Never Say Die: Live (2000)	Live from Austin, TX '89 (2006)

Professional ratings
Review scores
Source	Rating
AllMusic	4/5 stars

Never Say Die: Live is the third live album by Waylon Jennings, released on Sony Records through the Lucky Dog imprint on October 10, 2000.

Jennings' third live album – after Waylon Live (1976) – and his last record of original material to be released during his lifetime, it was recorded at Nashville's historic Ryman Auditorium between January 5 and 6, 2000. At that time, Jennings was battling both emphysema and severe diabetes that had forced him to give up the long tours he had done the majority of his career. The album is credited to "Waylon & The Waymores Blues Band", referring to the singer's backing band, actually a mix of many of his original road band, The Waylors, and additional musicians. The album features a host of guests, including Waylon's wife Jessi Colter and three artists then on Sony: Montgomery Gentry, John Anderson and Travis Tritt. The songs themselves are a mix of original Jennings hits, tracks from his more recent albums and compositions he had never covered. Like 1998's Closing in on the Fire, Never Say Die: Live reached #71 on the country charts.

The original 2000 release did not by any means constitute the complete concert, which ran an hour and forty minutes and was recorded by Sony in video. On July 24, 2007, Legacy Recordings, the Sony BMG reissue specialists, released the complete concert including all twenty-two tracks on two CDs and on DVD as well.

== Track listing ==
1. "Closing in on the Fire" (Tony Joe White) – 5:17
2. "Waymore's Blues" (Jennings, Curtis Buck) – 3:38
3. "Never Say Die" (Jennings) – 5:06
4. "Amanda" (Bob McDill) / "A Couple More Years" (Shel Silverstein, Dennis Locorriere) – 6:40
5. "Drift Away" (Mentor Williams) – 3:54
6. "Nothing Catches Jesus by Surprise" (Jennings, Tom Douglas) – 4:26
7. "Good Hearted Woman" (Jennings, Willie Nelson) – 3:36
8. "I'm Not Lisa" (Jessi Colter) – 3:12
9. "Storms Never Last" (Jessi Colter) – 3:39
10. "Never Been to Spain" (Hoyt Axton) – 5:28
11. "I'm a Ramblin' Man" (Ray Pennington) – 2:52
12. "Goin' Down Rockin'" (Tony Joe White, Leann White) – 5:31
13. "I've Always Been Crazy" (Jennings) – 4:19
14. "Can't You See" (Toy Caldwell) – 5:19

== Personnel ==
- Waylon Jennings - electric guitar, lead vocals
- Ritchie Albright - drums
- Jerry Bridges - bass guitar
- Jessi Colter - piano, vocals
- Jim Horn - flute, alto saxophone, tenor saxophone
- Barny Robertson - keyboards, vocals
- Carter Robertson - vocals
- Charles Rose - trombone
- Robby Turner - acoustic guitar, steel guitar, mandolin, vocals
- Rance Wasson - electric guitar, vocals
- Reggie Young - electric guitar
- Jenny Lynn - electric violin, cello

== 2007 reissue ==
Never Say Die: The Final Concert is a 2000 concert film featuring Waylon Jennings. Jennings, his health failing, played his last major concert at Nashville's historic Ryman Auditorium in January 2000. He was backed by the all-star Waymore Blues Band, whom Jennings called "the band I always wanted," and joined onstage by his wife Jessi Colter, and by guests John Anderson, Travis Tritt and Montgomery Gentry.

Waylon Jennings & The Waymore Blues Band Never Say Die The Final Concert Film

Live album by Waylon Jennings
- Released: July 24, 2007
- Recorded: January 5–6, 2000
- Genres: Country; outlaw country
- Length: 2:11:19
- Labels: Columbia; Legacy

Waylon Jennings chronology
Waylon Sings Hank Williams (2006)	Waylon Jennings & The Waymore Blues Band Never Say Die The Final Concert Film (2007)	Waylon Forever (2008)

Waylon Jennings live album chronology
Live from Austin, TX '89 (2006)	Never Say Die: The Final Concert (2007)	Live from Austin, TX '84 (2008)

Professional ratings
Review scores
Source	Rating
AllMusic	4/5 stars

=== Disc one ===
1. "Never Say Die" (Waylon Jennings) - 5:03
2. "Medley": Good Hearted Woman (Jennings, Willie Nelson)/Mamas Don't Let Your Babies Grow Up to Be Cowboys (Ed Bruce) - 4:31
3. "Trouble Man" (Jennings, Tony Joe White) - 3:12
4. "Medley": Amanda (Bob McDill)/A Couple More Years (Shel Silverstein, Dennis Locorriere) - 7:24
5. "Waymore's Blues" (Jennings, Curtis Buck) - 4:08
  - with John Anderson
6. "It's the World's Gone Crazy (Cotillion)" (Jennings, Silverstein) - 4:13
7. "Love's the Only Chain (Jessi Colter) - 4:03
  - with Jessi Colter
8. "I'm Not Lisa (Colter) - 3:12
  - with Jessi Colter
9. "Storms Never Last" (Colter) - 4:22
  - with Jessi Colter
10. "Suspicious Minds" (Mark James) - 4:15
  - with Jessi Colter
11. "Closing In on the Fire" (T. White) - 4:20

=== Disc two ===
1. "I'm a Ramblin' Man" (Ray Pennington) - 4:37
  - with Montgomery Gentry
2. "Help Me Make It Through the Night" (Kristofferson) - 4:10
3. "Havin' a Good Time" (Jennings) - 4:25
4. "Shakin' the Blues" (Jennings) - 3:37
5. "Nothing Catches Jesus by Surprise" (Jennings, Tom Douglas) - 4:22
6. "Never Been to Spain" (Hoyt Axton) - 6:06
7. "Drift Away" (Mentor Williams) - 4:25
8. "I've Always Been Crazy" (Jennings) - 5:09
  - with Travis Tritt
9. "Goin' Down Rockin'" (T. White, Leann White) - 3:26
10. "The Weight" (Robbie Robertson) - 4:42
11. "Can't You See" (Toy Caldwell) - 4:54

=== Disc 3 (DVD) ===
1. Never Say Die (Jennings) – 5:03
2. Medley: Good Hearted Woman (Jennings, Nelson)/Mamas Don't Let Your Babies Grow Up to Be Cowboys (Bruce) – 4:31
3. Trouble Man (Jennings, White) – 3:12
4. Medley: Amanda (McDill)/A Couple More Years (Silverstein, Locirriere) – 7:24
5. Waymore's Blues (Jennings, Curtis Buck) – 4:08
  - with John Anderson
6. It's The World's Gone Crazy (Cotillion) (Jennings, Silverstein) – 4:13
7. Love's The Only Chain (Colter) – 4:03
  - with Jessi Colter
8. I'm Not Lisa (Colter) – 3:12
  - with Jessi Colter
9. Storms Never Last (Colter) – 4:22
  - with Jessi Colter
10. Suspicious Minds (James) – 4:15
  - with Jessi Colter
11. Closing In On The Fire (White) – 4:20
12. I'm a Ramblin' Man (Ray Pennington) – 4:37
  - with Montgomery Gentry
13. Help Me Make It Through the Night (Kristofferson) – 4:10
14. Havin' A Good Time (Jennings) – 4:25
15. Shakin' The Blues (Jennings) – 3:37
16. Nothing Catches Jesus By Surprise (Jennings, Tom Douglas) – 4:22
17. Never Been to Spain (Axton) – 6:06
18. Drift Away (Williams) – 4:25
19. I've Always Been Crazy (Jennings) – 5:09
  - with Travis Tritt
20. Goin' Down Rockin' (White, Leann White) – 3:26
21. The Weight (Robertson) – 4:42
22. Can't You See (Caldwell) – 4:54

== Chart performance ==
=== 2000 ===
Chart (2000)	Peak position
U.S. Billboard Top Country Albums	71

=== 2007 ===
Chart (2007)	Peak position
U.S. Billboard Top Country Albums	67
