= The Very Best of Jessi Colter: An Outlaw...a Lady =

The Very Best of Jessi Colter: An Outlaw, a Lady

Greatest hits album by Jessi Colter
- Released: September 2, 2003
- Recorded: 1970s–1980s
- Genre: Country, outlaw country
- Label: Capitol

Jessi Colter chronology
Jessi Colter Sings Just for Kids: Songs from Around the World (1996)	The Very Best of Jessi Colter: An Outlaw, a Lady (2003)	Out of the Ashes (2006)

Professional ratings
Review scores
Source	Rating
Allmusic	5/5 stars

The Very Best of Jessi Colter: An Outlaw, a Lady is a compilation album released by Capitol records; the collection features Country music singer Jessi Colter's biggest hits from the 1970s and 1980s.

The album includes Colter's signature song, the pop-country crossover hit "I'm Not Lisa", plus, its follow-up -- "What's Happened to Blue Eyes"—which reached #5 on the Country charts in 1975. The album includes nine of Colter's ten total charted hits.

== Track listing ==
1. "You Mean to Say" - 2:30
2. "Suspicious Minds" (with Waylon Jennings) - 3:57
3. "Under Your Spell Again" (with Waylon Jennings) - 2:53
4. "I'm Not Lisa" - 3:23
5. "What's Happened to Blue Eyes" - 2:22
6. "You Ain't Been Loved (Like I'm Gonna Love You)" - 2:59
7. "Storms Never Last" (with Waylon Jennings) - 4:16
8. "It's Morning (And I Still Love You)" - 2:25
9. "Without You" - 3:59
10. "Here I Am" - 3:46
11. "I Belong to Him" - 4:06
12. "New Wine" - 3:50
13. "I Thought I Heard You Calling My Name" - 3:57
14. "You Hung the Moon (Didn't You Waylon?)" - 3:23
15. "Maybe You Should've Been Listening" - 4:39
16. "That's the Way a Cowboy Rocks and Rolls" - 3:24
17. "Hold Back the Tears" - 3:03
18. "The Wild Side of Life/It Wasn't God Who Made Honky Tonk Angels" (medley) (with Waylon Jennings) - 3:21
