= Neil Reshen =

Talent manager (1939–2014)

- Reshen in 1975
- Born: March 3, 1939; Danbury, Connecticut, U.S.
- Died: December 6, 2014 (aged 75); The Bronx, New York, U.S.
- Occupations: Talent manager, lawyer, accountant
- Years active: 1960–2010
- Known for: Gaining Waylon Jennings and Willie Nelson their creative freedom from their respective record labels in 1973, creating the outlaw movement and bringing creative freedom throughout the genre of country music.

Neil Charles Reshen (born March 3, 1939 – December 6, 2014) was a talent manager, lawyer, and accountant, best known for being the manager of both Waylon Jennings and Willie Nelson in the 1970s.

In addition to Jennings and Nelson, Reshen throughout his career also served as a manager for performers such as Miles Davis, Frank Zappa, The Velvet Underground, Alice Cooper, David Allan Coe, Linda Ronstadt, Billy Joe Shaver, Jessi Colter, and Tompall Glaser, among others. He also served as a manager in other fields as well, having served as the manager for Andy Warhol, Roger Kahn, Peter Golenbock, and Peter Max.

== Career ==
=== Early career; 1960-1972 ===
By the late 1960s, Reshen was serving as business manager of Bizarre Records, having gone to London to establish European offices for the label. At the time he represented several musicians and artists, including Dion, The Delfonics, Peter Max, Tim Buckley, Linda Ronstadt and Fred Neil.

=== Outlaw country; 1973-1978 ===
In 1972, Reshen became the manager for Waylon Jennings, who had become more and more dissatisfied with the control that RCA Records had taken over his recordings.

That same year Jennings had contracted hepatitis and was considering retirement when his drummer and right-hand man, Richie Albright, encouraged him to seek out new management. Reshen, who was based in New York, began negotiating a new agreement between Jennings and RCA. Reshen's style impressed Jennings, with the singer later characterizing his manager as being "like a mad dog on a leash." which had the unintended consequence of giving Reshen his nickname "mad dog".

The negotiations holistically changed Jennings' contract situation. Reshen obtained a much larger advance for Jennings and, full artistic control over his recordings which he had been seeking out since moving to Nashville in 1965. Reshen also renegotiated some of Jennings' touring dealings and promoted him outside of traditional country-music venues, including booking him at rock-oriented venues such as Max's Kansas City in New York for a January 17, 1973 concert.

As Jennings and Nelson became increasingly successful, in the mid-1970s, their relationships with Reshen deteriorated. In August 1977, federal authorities intercepted a package of cocaine sent from Reshen's New York office to Jennings. The incident resulted in a brief arrest of Jennings, his secretary Lori Evans, his drummer Richie Albright, and most notably Reshen's assistant Mark Rothbaum. Rothbaum was later sentenced to 18 months in a minimum-security prison for his involvement. After seeing this, upon his release Willie Nelson fired Reshen and hired Rothbaum due to taking the fall with Jennings soon following suit.

=== Later years ===
In 1996 Reshen founded Benay Enterprises, in Danbury, Connecticut. He would retire in 2010, handing over the reins to his daughter Dawn.

== Personal life ==
Reshen graduated from Baruch College in 1960.

Reshen had two daughters Dawn Reshen-Doty and Amber Bezahler.

=== Death ===
Reshen died on December 6, 2014, following complications from Alzheimer's disease.

== Filmography ==
Television
Year	Title	Role	Notes
2001	CMT: Inside Fame: Waylon Jennings	Self	First television appearance
2023	Willie Nelson & Family	Self	S1:E2, S1:E4; Archival footage
