= Diamond in the Rough (Jessi Colter album) =

Studio album by Jessi Colter
- Released: July 1976
- Genre: Country
- Label: Capitol
- Producer: Ken Mansfield; Waylon Jennings

Jessi Colter chronology
Wanted! The Outlaws (1976)	Diamond in the Rough (1976)	Mirriam (1977)

Singles from Diamond in the Rough
- 1. "I Thought I Heard You Calling My Name" Released: August 30, 1976

Professional ratings
Review scores
Source	Rating
AllMusic	4/5 stars

Diamond in the Rough is the fourth studio album released by American country artist Jessi Colter. It was the second album issued by Colter in 1976; the previous was Jessi, released earlier in the year. Diamond in the Rough was issued under Capitol Records and was produced by Ken Mansfield.

== Background ==
Diamond in the Rough was issued as Colter's second studio album in 1976, containing ten new tracks, which included a cover of the Beatles' "Hey Jude". The album only spawned one single released in 1977, titled "I Thought I Heard You Calling My Name", which peaked at No. 29 on the Hot Country Songs chart. The song's B-side, "You Hung the Moon (Didn't You Waylon)", was also released as a single, however it failed to chart. Diamond in the Rough peaked at No. 4 on the Top Country Albums chart (Colter's third album in a row to do so), while also reaching No. 79 on the Billboard 200 albums chart. The album was co-produced by Colter's husband, country music artist Waylon Jennings, who also produced her previous two albums.

== Track listing ==
All tracks composed by Jessi Colter; except where indicated

1. "Diamond in the Rough" (Donnie Fritts, Spooner Oldham)
2. "Get Back" (John Lennon, Paul McCartney)
3. "Would You Leave Now"
4. "Hey Jude" (John Lennon, Paul McCartney)
5. "Oh Will (Who Made it Rain Last Night)"
6. "I Thought I Heard You Calling My Name" (Lee Emerson)
7. "Ain't No Way" (Tere Mansfield)
8. "You Hung the Moon (Didn't You Waylon)"
9. "Woman's Heart Is a Handy Place to Be" (Cort Casady, Marshall Chapman)
10. "Oh Will"

== Personnel ==
- Jessi Colter – lead vocals, keyboards
- Richie Albright – drums
- Bill C. Graham – mandolin, violin
- Sherman Hayes – bass
- John Leslie Hug – guitar
- Waylon Jennings – backing vocals, guitar, producer
- Ken Mansfield – producer
- Todd Miller – horn
- Ralph Mooney – steel guitar
- Clifford "Barny" Robertson – backing vocals, keyboards
- Carter Robertson — backing vocals
- Don Robertson — keyboards
- Craig Ware — horn
- Robert Ware — horn

== Chart positions ==
Album – Billboard (North America), RPM (Canada)

Year	Chart	Position
1976	Country Albums	4
1976	Pop Albums	79
1976	Canadian Albums	64

Singles - Billboard (United States), RPM (Canada)

Year	Single	Chart	Position
1976	"I Thought I Heard You Calling My Name"	Country Singles	29
1976	"I Thought I Heard You Calling My Name"	Canadian Country Singles	48
