= The New South =

Studio album by Hank Williams Jr.
- Released: 1977
- Recorded: August 1977
- Studio: American Studios (Nashville)
- Genre: Country
- Length: 38:54
- Label: Elektra/Curb
- Producers: Waylon Jennings; Richie Albright

Hank Williams Jr. chronology
One Night Stands (1977)	The New South (1977)	Family Tradition (1979)

Singles from The New South
- 1. "Feelin' Better" Released: 1977

Alternative cover
- International release album cover

Professional ratings
Review scores
Source	Rating
allmusic	2.5/5 stars

The New South is the twenty ninth studio album by American country music artist Hank Williams Jr. It was released in 1977 by Curb Records, his second album for the label. This album also served as the first album outside of RCA produced by Waylon Jennings.

== Background ==
Williams recorded The New South in the summer of 1977 with Richie Albright and Waylon Jennings serving as producers. The sessions notably resulted in Jennings' arrest which took place while Jennings was laying the backing vocals on the albums eighth track, "Storms Never Last", a song wrote by Waylon's wife Jessi Colter.

The album's lead single, "Feelin' Better" was released in the fall that year, and reached No. 38 on the Billboard Hot Country Singles charts.

== Track listing ==
- "Feelin' Better" (Hank Williams Jr.) – 3:59
- "Montgomery In the Rain" (Steve Young) – 3:56
- "Looking At the Rain" (Gordon Lightfoot) – 3:42
- "You're Gonna Change (Or I'm Gonna Leave)" (Hank Williams) – 3:59
- "How's My Ex Treating You" (Vic McAlpin) – 3:05
- "Uncle Pen" (Bill Monroe) – 3:24
- "Once and for All" (Williams Jr.) – 3:18
- "Storms Never Last" (Jessi Colter) – 3:29
- "New South" (Williams Jr.) – 4:21
- "Tennessee" (Williams Jr.) – 2:21
- "Long Way to Hollywood" (Young) – 3:59

== Personnel ==
- Hank Williams, Jr. - vocals, acoustic guitar, dobro, fiddle, electric guitar, keyboards
- Waylon Jennings - producer, background vocals, acoustic guitar, electric guitar
- Richie Albright - producer
- Leon Sherrill - acoustic guitar, backing vocals, electric guitar
- Tim Ryan - arrangement, backing vocals, fiddle
- Chris Plunkett - bass
- Steve Herbert - drums, washboard
- Rick Hall - fiddle
- Johnny Christopher - electric guitar
- Reggie Jackson - electric guitar
- Jim Kremsner - jews harp, keyboards
- Dickey Overbey - pedal steel guitar
- Jeff Allen - pedal steel guitar

Technical

- James R. Smith, Tessa Coker - coordinator
- Al Cartee, Don Cartee, Terry Skinner - engineer
- Gary Heery, Jim Shea - photography

== Charts ==
Chart (1981)	Peak position
US Top Country Albums (Billboard)	36
