= Music Man (album) =

Studio album by Waylon Jennings
- Released: May 1980
- Recorded: 1980
- Genres: Country; outlaw country
- Length: 32:13
- Label: RCA Victor
- Producers: Richie Albright (all tracks); Ron Haffkine (tracks 1 and 7); Waylon Jennings (all tracks)

Waylon Jennings chronology
| What Goes Around Comes Around (1979) | Music Man (1980) | Leather and Lace (1981) |

Singles from Music Man
- 1. "Clyde" Released: April 1980; 2. "Theme from The Dukes of Hazzard (Good Ol' Boys)" Released: August 1980

Music Man is the twenty-seventh studio album by American country music artist Waylon Jennings, released in 1980 on RCA Victor.

== Recording and composition ==
The new decade brought another #1 album for Jennings, his fifth since 1976. Produced by the singer and Waylon's drummer Richie Albright, the mood is lighter than it had been on Jennings' previous release, the ballad-heavy What Goes Around Comes Around. Jennings later said of both records, "Virtually identical in cover look and personnel, the two albums revolved around his resolute bass drum, while the guitars swirled, traded licks, and I rode the rhythm section like a palomino."

It contains the popular "Theme from "The Dukes of Hazzard" (Good Ol' Boys)", which became Jennings' tenth solo #1 hit. As the narrator for the 1975 movie Moonrunners, Jennings was tapped to serve in the same capacity for The Dukes of Hazzard which premiered on CBS in 1979 and was based on Moonrunners. Jennings wrote the theme song for the show and recorded two versions: the television theme version and a slightly different version made commercially available on both single and album which received radio airplay. The television show version features a banjo which the commercially available version does not, as well as a bridge which follows the first verse and chorus. Following the second chorus, Jennings makes a tongue-in-cheek reference to his faceless appearance in the credits by singing, "I'm a good ol' boy, you know my mama loves me, but she don't understand why they keep showing my hands and not my face on TV!", a statement referring to the opening shot in the television theme version where Jennings is only shown below the neck playing guitar. As Andrew Dansby of Rolling Stone wryly noted in 2002, "In 1980, another generation discovered Jennings, albeit only a third of him." The song was certified double-platinum by the Recording Industry Association of America with over 2 million in sales.

Jennings' other songwriting contribution, "It's Alright," is a simultaneous tribute to Oklahoma rocker J.J. Cale (Music Man opens with a cover of Cale's song "Clyde") and George Jones ("If we could all sing like we wanted to, we'd all sound like George Jones"). Waylon also mentions his wife Jessi Colter on "It's Alright" and recorded her song "Storms Never Last" for the LP, which they would reprise on their duet album Leather and Lace. In the liner notes to The Essential Waylon Jennings, Wade Jessen quotes the singer: "Jessi had this song and she threw it away. Like Lash Larue I brought it back. She said, 'I have a silly song for you.' There was not a rhyming line it, every line in the song standing on its own. At first the chorus went, 'Storms never last/Do they, Waylon?' She wrote it for me." The singles "Clyde" and "Storms Never Last" reached #7 and #17 respectively.

Jennings relied on covers heavily for Music Man, which may have been an indication of his dampened creativity due to years of touring, recording, and drug abuse. In addition to Cale, he also covers songs by Kenny Rogers, whose 1979 album Kenny had kept Waylon's previous album out of the #1 spot, and Jimmy Buffett. One of Jennings most unexpected recordings is his surprisingly credible version of Steely Dan's 1972 song "Do It Again", although for some purists his propensity for remaking songs well outside the realms of country music was in danger of becoming schtick. Jennings was far more at home on the Ernest Tubb classic "Waltz Across Texas" and the Harlan Howard's lascivious "Nashville Wimmen." Jerry Reed, Johnny Rodriguez, and Randy Scruggs play on the album.

== Critical reception ==
Professional ratings
Review scores
| Source | Rating |
|---|---|
| AllMusic | 3/5 stars |

AllMusic: "...in retrospect it's easy to hear that Waylon was on some unsteady ground around this time. Not that this is a bad record, but it does show signs that he was relying a little too much on polish and that his ear for material is slightly off...It's an album that, once again, doesn't quite add up to the sound of its parts, and in retrospect, those parts do seem to point toward his commercial and artistic collapse a few years away, but even with these flaws, Music Man is a pretty entertaining latter-day Waylon album."

== Track listing ==
| No. | Title | Writer(s) | Length |
|---|---|---|---|
| 1. | "Clyde" | J. J. Cale | 2:39 |
| 2. | "It's Alright" | Waylon Jennings | 3:00 |
| 3. | "Theme from The Dukes of Hazzard (Good Ol' Boys)" | Jennings | 2:06 |
| 4. | "Nashville Wimmin'" | Harlan Howard | 3:32 |
| 5. | "Do It Again" | Walter Becker, Donald Fagen | 3:45 |
| 6. | "Sweet Music Man" | Kenny Rogers | 3:34 |
| 7. | "Storms Never Last" | Jessi Colter | 2:49 |
| 8. | "He Went to Paris" | Jimmy Buffett | 3:19 |
| 9. | "What About You?" | Jack Anglin, Johnnie Wright | 3:33 |
| 10. | "Waltz Across Texas" | Ernest Tubb | 3:56 |

== Personnel ==
- Waylon Jennings - vocals, guitar, dobro, banjo
- Richie Albright - drums, percussion
- Ralph Mooney - steel guitar, dobro
- Duke Goff - bass
- Jerry Bridges - bass
- Billy Ray Reynolds - guitar
- Randy Scruggs - guitar
- Jerry Reed - guitar
- Gordon Payne - guitar, harmonica
- Johnny Rodriguez - guitar
- Rance Wasson - guitar
- Carter Robertson - backing vocals
- Barney Robertson - keyboards
- Charles Cochrane - keyboards
- Bill Graham - fiddle
- Rick (L.D.) Wayne - guitar

== Charts ==
=== Weekly charts ===
| Chart (1980) | Peak position |
|---|---|
| Canadian Albums (RPM) | 46 |
| Canadian Country Albums (RPM) | 1 |
| US Billboard 200 | 36 |
| US Top Country Albums (Billboard) | 1 |

=== Year-end charts ===
| Chart (1980) | Position |
|---|---|
| US Top Country Albums (Billboard) | 34 |

== Certifications ==
| Region | Certification | Certified units/sales |
|---|---|---|
| United States (RIAA) | Gold | 500,000^{^} |
^{^} Shipments figures based on certification alone.
