= American Studios =

US recording studio (1967–1972) located at 1117 South Avenue in Nashville, Tennessee

- American Studios in 1989

General information
- Location: 1111 17th Avenue South, Nashville, Tennessee
- Coordinates: 36.144056°N 86.794661°W

American Studios, later Eleven-Eleven Sound, was a recording studio located in Nashville, Tennessee which operated from 1972 to 1993. Founded by Chips Moman, the studio at 1111 17th Avenue South was the successor to its Memphis, Tennessee location that shut down in 1972.

Artists who recorded at American included Elvis Presley, Waylon Jennings, Jessi Colter, Johnny Cash, Rosanne Cash, Roy Orbison, Jerry Lee Lewis, Carl Perkins, Guy Clark, Lee Clayton, Kenny Rogers, Townes Van Zandt, Carlene Carter, The Earl Scruggs Revue, Billie Jo Spears, Larry Gatlin, Tracy Nelson, and Del Reeves.

The building's studio portion currently still stands today as the offices of Bob Doyle & Associates, Inc. who currently serves as the management agency for country musicians Garth Brooks, Zach Top, Treaty Oak Revival, and others. The office section, formerly Jennings' personal office from 1976-1998, is currently inhabited by Frost Specialty, Inc.

== History ==
=== Founding ===
The former American Studios in June 2025

American Studios was established in 1973 on Music Row in Nashville, Tennessee following the closing of American Sound Studios in Memphis, Tennessee. The studio was owned by Chips Moman. Moman's Memphis operation was one of the most successful independent studios in the U.S. in the late-1960s, with artists like Elvis Presley, B. J. Thomas, Neil Diamond and Dusty Springfield all recording there.

Moman's move into Nashville began his increasing involvement in country music. Several musicians associated with the Memphis operation of American would become active in Nashville, including guitarist Reggie Young, keys players Bobby Emmons and Bobby Wood, bassist Mike Leech and drummer Gene Chrisman.

=== Waylon Jennings and The Waylors ===
The studio became closely associated with Waylon Jennings and his backing band The Waylors around the midpoint of the 1970s. Jennings first sessions there began in December 1976, continuing into January the next year.

Among the recordings made in these sessions was Jennings' album Ol' Waylon, produced by Moman. Its best-known single, "Luckenbach, Texas (Back to the Basics of Love)", was written by Moman and their in-house keyboardist Bobby Emmons. Moman later in life recalled that he and Emmons wrote the song at the 1111 17th Avenue South studio after deciding to travel to Luckenbach, Texas. The recording became the biggest commercial hit of Jennings' entire career.

On August 23, 1977, federal agents followed a package containing cocaine to the American Studios properties while Jennings was recording backing vocals at the studio during sessions for the Hank Williams Jr. album The New South.

Jennings continued using the facility following the incident. Sessions held at America produced material that appeared on I've Always Been Crazy, What Goes Around Comes Around, and Music Man as well as more recent posthumous material such as Songbird (2025) and Diamonds (2026).

The relationship between Jennings and the studio would start to deteriorate at the start of the next decade. Jennings entered into an agreement to lease the studio in early 1980 but left the facility in May, claiming that the recording equipment failed to meet the conditions of the agreement and that prior recordings made there could not be released. In October 1980, Jennings brought a lawsuit against the studio and sought $150,000 in damages, alleging delays to his recording schedule and damage to his reputation. The studio filed a countersuit against Jennings, alleging that approximately $40,000 worth of their recording equipment had been removed when he left the facility.

=== Eleven-Eleven Sound ===
The facility was rebranded to Eleven-Eleven Sound by 1984, with it being used for sessions by Johnny Cash with producer Billy Sherrill. Material recorded there in April and May 1984 remained unreleased for nearly three decades before appearing on Cash's 2014 posthumous album Out Among the Stars.

During this time, Eleven-Eleven was upgraded for both analog and digital recording. The studio was sold in the late 1980s to Frank DiLeo, who was serving as Michael Jackson's manager at the time. The studio remained an active recording facility into the early 1990s, and would shutter its doors soon after.

== See also ==
- American Sound Studio
- Chips Moman
- Waylon Jennings' 1977 arrest
