= It's Morning (And I Still Love You) =

Single by Jessi Colter

from the album Jessi
- B-side: "Would You Walk with Me (To the Lilies)"
- Released: December 8, 1975
- Recorded: 1975
- Studio: Woodland (Nashville, Tennessee)
- Genre: Country
- Length: 2:20
- Label: Capitol
- Songwriter: Jessi Colter
- Producers: Ken Mansfield; Waylon Jennings

Jessi Colter singles chronology
"What's Happened to Blue Eyes" (1975)	"It's Morning (And I Still Love You)" (1975)	"Without You" (1976)

"It's Morning (And I Still Love You)" is a song by American country music artist Jessi Colter. It was released on December 8, 1975, as the lead single from her album Jessie. The song was Colter's third consecutive hit single on the Billboard Country Chart, peaking in the Top 20 in 1976.

== Content ==
"It's Morning (And I Still Love You)" was entirely written by Colter. The song describes the morning after a one-night stand, and how the couple discovers they are still in love.

The song was produced by Ken Mansfield and Waylon Jennings (a country music artist and Colter's husband), who also produced her two previous singles and the album that song was released on in 1976, Jessi. Both men would produce Colter's further Capitol releases during the decade. The song would also be issued on Colter's 2003 compilation, The Very Best of Jessi Colter: An Outlaw...a Lady.

== Chart performance ==
"It's Morning (And I Still Love You)" was released December 8, 1975, and made its country chart debut January 3, 1976. The song became major hit, reaching #11 on the Billboard Hot Country Songs chart in 1976, becoming Colter's first Capitol single to not reach the Top 10 on the country chart. In addition, it also peaked at #20 on the Canadian RPM country chart in 1976. The song was released on Colter's third studio album, Jessi in early 1976, which was also successful. "It's Morning (And I Still Love You)" would become Colter's final major hit single as a solo recording artist, however, she would continue having success with duet hits with Jennings in the 1970s and early 80s.

=== Charts ===
Chart (1975–1976)	Peak position
U.S. Billboard Hot Country Songs	11
Canadian RPM Country Singles	20
