= Mirriam =

Studio album by Jessi Colter
- Released: July 1977
- Genre: Country
- Label: Capitol
- Producers: Ken Mansfield; Richie Albright

Jessi Colter chronology
Diamond in the Rough (1976)	Mirriam (1977)	That's the Way a Cowboy Rocks and Rolls (1978)

Singles from Mirriam
- 1. "I Belong to Him" Released: August 15, 1977

Professional ratings
Review scores
Source	Rating
Allmusic	2.5/5 stars

Mirriam is the fifth studio album released by American country artist, Jessi Colter. It was issued in July 1977 on Capitol Records.

== Background ==
Colter's fifth album was derived from her birth name, Mirriam Johnson. The album consisted of ten new tracks, all of which were written by Colter. The album's lead single, "I Belong to Him" (which featured Waylon Jennings and Roy Orbison), was the only song released from the album, and did not chart on the Hot Country Songs or the Billboard Hot 100 charts upon its release. In addition, the album peaked at #29 the Top Country Albums chart, becoming Colter's first studio album to chart outside of the Top 10. Mirriam was produced by Ken Mansfield (the producer of Colter's previous three releases under Capitol) and Richie Albright.

The album did not gain many positive reviews from music critics and magazines. Allmusic.com reviewed the album, and gave it two and a half out of five stars.

== Track listing ==
All tracks composed by Jessi Colter.

1. "For Mama" – 3:11
2. "Put Your Arms Around Me" – 3:11
3. "I Belong to Him" – 4:04
  - featuring Waylon Jennings and Roy Orbison
4. "God if I Could Only Write Your Love Song" – 3:02
5. "Consider Me" – 3:45
6. "There Ain't No Rain" – 2:34
7. "God I Love You" – 3:02
8. "Let it Go" – 2:53
9. "Master, Master" – 2:59
10. "New Wine" – 3:44

== Personnel ==
- Jessi Colter – keyboards, lead vocals
- Richie Albright – drums, producer
- Johnny Christopher – guitar
- Jim Gordon – horn
- Sherman Hayes – bass
- Dick Hyde – trombone
- Waylon Jennings – backing vocals on "I Belong to Him", guitar
- Mackinley Johnson – trumpet
- Gayle Lavant – harp
- G. Merlin – dulcimer
- Ralph Mooney – steel guitar
- Roy Orbison – backing vocals on "I Belong to Him"
- Gordon Payne – guitar
- Clifford "Barny" Robertson – backing vocals, keyboards
- Carter Robertson – backing vocals
- Rance Wasson – guitar
- Toni Wine – backing vocals on "Let It Go"

Technical

- Chips Moman, Don Cobb, Jake Hottell, Richie Albright – engineers
- Roy Kohara – art direction

== Charts ==
Album – Billboard (North America)

Year	Chart	Peak position
1977	Country Albums	29

Singles - Billboard (United States)

Year	Single	Chart	Peak position
1977	"I Belong to Him"	Country Singles	N/A
