= Storms Never Last =

1975 song written by Jessi Colter

- 1981 Jennings and Colter duet single

Song by Jessi Colter

from the album I'm Jessi Colter
- Released: January 17, 1975
- Recorded: October 1974
- Genre: Country
- Length: 4:14
- Label: Capitol
- Songwriter: Jessi Colter
- Producers: Ken Mansfield; Waylon Jennings

"Storms Never Last" is a song written and recorded by American country music singer-songwriter Jessi Colter. The song first appeared as the closing track to her 1975 album I'm Jessi Colter.

The song is most known for the duet version released by Colter and her husband, Waylon Jennings, on their 1981 album Leather and Lace.

== Background ==
The song uses the metaphor of a storm to show hardship and uncertainty, while emphasizing perseverance and the enduring strength when in love. Colter later explained that the title itself came from a picture of a wrecked home she saw in a magazine while visiting a doctor's office one day.

== Recording and release ==
=== Original recording ===
Colter originally cut "Storms Never Last" for her 1975 album I'm Jessi Colter, on Capitol Records.

== Charts ==
=== Waylon Jennings and Jessi Colter version (1981) ===
Chart performance for "Storms Never Last"
Chart (1981)	Peak position	Ref
US Billboard Hot Country Singles	17	
Canada Country Singles	11	

== Cover versions ==
- Connie Smith and The Jordanaires recorded the song for Smith's 1976 album I Don't Wanna Talk It Over Anymore.
- Hank Williams Jr. covered the song on his 1977 album The New South. This version is particularly notable as Waylon Jennings co-produced and sang backing vocals on it. While cutting the backing vocals for it at American Studios, he was involved in a drug bust by the DEA that led to him being briefly arrested on August 23, 1977.
- Dr. Hook featured the song on their 1978 album Pleasure & Pain.
- David Allan Coe released the song on his 1986 album Son of the South.
- Kristy Dee recorded the song as a duet with Colter and released it as a single in 2011.
- John Prine and Lee Ann Womack recorded the song as a duet and released it on Prine's 2016 album For Better, or Worse.
