= Clyde (song) =

Single by Waylon Jennings

from the album Music Man
- B-side: "I Came Here to Party"
- Released: April 1980
- Genre: Country
- Length: 2:39
- Label: RCA
- Songwriter: J. J. Cale
- Producers: Richie Albright; Ron Haffkine; Waylon Jennings

Waylon Jennings singles chronology
"I Ain't Living Long Like This" (1979)	"Clyde" (1980)	"Theme from The Dukes of Hazzard (Good Ol' Boys)" (1980)

"Clyde" is a song written by J. J. Cale, which first appeared on his 1971 album Naturally. American musical group Dr. Hook covered the song on their 1978 album Pleasure and Pain. The song was also successfully covered by American country music artist Waylon Jennings.

Released in April 1980, as the first single from Jennings' album Music Man, it reached #7 on the Billboard Hot Country Singles chart and #1 on the RPM Country Tracks chart in Canada.

== Chart performance ==
Chart (1980)	Peak position
US Hot Country Songs (Billboard)	7
US Bubbling Under Hot 100 (Billboard)	3
Canadian RPM Country Tracks	1
