= Theme from The Dukes of Hazzard (Good Ol' Boys) =

Single by Waylon Jennings

from the album Music Man
- B-side: "It's Alright"
- Released: August 1980
- Recorded: 1980
- Genre: Country, outlaw country
- Length: 2:06
- Label: RCA
- Songwriter: Waylon Jennings
- Producers: Richie Albright; Waylon Jennings

Waylon Jennings singles chronology
"Clyde" (1980)	"Theme from The Dukes of Hazzard (Good Ol' Boys)" (1980)	"Storms Never Last" (1981)

The "Theme from The Dukes of Hazzard (Good Ol' Boys)" is a song written and recorded by American country music singer Waylon Jennings. It was released in August 1980 as the second single from the album Music Man. Recognizable to fans as the theme to the CBS comedy adventure television series The Dukes of Hazzard, the song became a #1 hit on the Billboard Hot Country Singles chart in 1980.

== History ==
As the narrator for the movie Moonrunners (1975), Jennings was tapped to serve in the same capacity for The Dukes of Hazzard which premiered on CBS in 1979 and was based on Moonrunners. Jennings wrote the theme song for the show and recorded two versions: the television theme version and a slightly different version made commercially available on both single and album which received radio airplay.

The television show version features Larry McNeely's banjo work which the commercially available version does not. Additionally, the television version's third verse contains the lyric, "Fightin' the system like two modern-day Robin Hoods", which is accompanied by a "Yee-haw!" said by characters, Bo Duke (John Schneider) and Luke Duke (Tom Wopat), though it is in fact Schneider's vocal used twice.

The commercially available version receiving radio airplay contains a musical bridge which follows the first verse and chorus. Also, following the commercial version's second chorus, Jennings makes a tongue-in-cheek reference to his faceless appearance in the credits by singing, "I'm a good ol' boy, you know my mama loves me, but she don't understand, they keep-a showin' my hands and not my face on TV" (a statement referring to the opening shot in the television theme version where Jennings is only shown below the neck playing guitar).

Most of Jennings' greatest hits albums and various compilation releases containing the "Theme from The Dukes of Hazzard (Good Ol' Boys)" feature the commercially available version.

== Commercial performance ==
In November 1980, "Theme from The Dukes of Hazzard (Good Ol' Boys)" became Jennings' twelfth #1 country hit overall (tenth as a solo recording act). The song spent seventeen weeks on the Billboard country singles charts and became his biggest hit on the Billboard Hot 100, peaking at #21. It also appeared on several other music charts. The original 1980 single was certified gold by the Recording Industry Association of America for sales over a million. Subsequent to the 2005 movie, the song was certified platinum in 2007 for a million ringtone sales. Note: the certification sales qualification levels had been changed in 1989.

=== Charts ===
Chart (1980)	Peak position
New Zealand Singles Chart	26
Canadian RPM Country Tracks	2
US Billboard Hot 100	21
US Hot Country Songs (Billboard)	1
U.S. Cashbox Top 100	22

== Other versions ==
The song was covered by the Swedish Lo-fi-group Loosegoats on their demo For Sale by Owner but has never been featured on any of their full-length albums.

Rapper Lil Wyte sampled the song on his song "Comin' Yo Direction" off his album Doubt Me Now.

The song was frequently covered live by Ween during their brief country phase.

== Other artists ==
Waylon Jennings' son Shooter Jennings is known for singing "Good ol' Boys" at the Dukefests, which honor the series, and his late father.

Along with Willie Nelson and Ben L. Jones (Cooter on the series), Waylon Jennings sang the song in an extended version.

Alvin and the Chipmunks covered the song while driving The General Lee for their album The Chipmunks Go Hollywood (1982).

In 2006, John Schneider (Bo Duke), Tom Wopat (Luke Duke), and Catherine Bach (Daisy Duke) made a music video, as seen on the 7th Season DVD of the series. Schneider also covered the song.

In The Dukes of Hazzard film adaptation (2005), a recording of Waylon Jennings was used in one scene, also, as heard on the soundtrack, by Willie Nelson (Uncle Jesse in the film).

In the film The Dukes of Hazzard: The Beginning (2007), country singer John Anderson sings the theme.

Rock band Cage9, performed a cover version of the song was heard in the trailers from the same two films.

Nike used the song in an advertising campaign featuring NFL star Randy Moss and NBA star Jason Williams, who were teammates in the same high school in rural Belle, West Virginia.

The song was featured in Supernatural season 15's "Last Call" where it was sung by Jensen Ackles and Christian Kane as their characters Dean Winchester and Lee Webb.

Josh Turner released a version of the song on his Country State Of Mind cd

Mexican country group The Forasteros covers the theme song live.

John Schneider has released 2 album versions and sung the song with Ray Stevens and several others through the years.
