= Wanted! The Outlaws =

Compilation album by Waylon Jennings, Willie Nelson, Jessi Colter and Tompall Glaser
- Released: Original: January 12, 1976; Re-issued: February 15, 1996
- Recorded: 1965–1975 (original); 1965–1995 (1996 re-release)
- Genres: Country; outlaw country
- Length: 32:37 (original); 60:49 (reissue)
- Label: RCA Victor
- Producers: Waylon Jennings; Richie Albright; Chet Atkins; Danny Davis; Tompall Glaser; Ray Kennedy; Willie Nelson; Ray Pennington; Shel Silverstein

Waylon Jennings chronology
Dreaming My Dreams (1975)	Wanted! The Outlaws (1976)	Mackintosh & T.J. (1976)

Jessi Colter chronology
Jessi (1976)	Wanted! The Outlaws (1976)	Diamond in the Rough (1976)

Wanted! The Outlaws is a compilation album by Waylon Jennings, Willie Nelson, Jessi Colter, and Tompall Glaser, released by RCA Records in 1976. The album consists of previously released material with four new songs. Released to capitalize on the new outlaw country movement, Wanted! The Outlaws earned its place in music history by becoming the first country album to be platinum-certified, reaching sales of one million.

The album quickly reached No. 1 on the country charts and peaked at No. 10 on the pop charts, with two hit singles released, "Suspicious Minds" and "Good Hearted Woman." The two peaked at No. 2 and No. 1, respectively, both featuring Jennings. In 1984, this album was among the first to be reissued on compact disc by RCA Records, catalog number PCD1-1321.

== Background ==
By 1973, Waylon Jennings and Willie Nelson had asserted creative control over their music, which they both felt had been hampered for years by the conservative approach taken to their recordings at the Nashville division of RCA Records. In 1972, Nelson left the label for Atlantic Records and recorded a pair of critically acclaimed albums, Shotgun Willie (1973) and the concept album Phases and Stages (1974). With Nelson's popularity increasing, RCA did not want to lose Jennings as well, and granted him the authority to produce his records however he wanted. Jennings released the seminal Honky Tonk Heroes album in 1973, widely considered the first "outlaw" album, and This Time in 1974, which was recorded at Glaser Sound Studios, an independent studio in Nashville owned by brothers Chuck, Jim and Tompall Glaser. By 1975, after the explosive success of Nelson's Red Headed Stranger album, a whole new subgenre of country music had emerged called outlaw country. This new movement featured a more "progressive" sound, typified by the music of Jennings and Nelson but also inspired by songwriters like Kris Kristofferson, Billy Joe Shaver, Mickey Newbury, Lee Clayton, David Allan Coe and Townes Van Zandt.

In the wake of Red Headed Stranger and the general media attention the outlaw country movement was generating, producer Jerry Bradley at the RCA studios in Nashville was determined to capitalize on the wealth of Jennings and Nelson recordings that RCA had at their disposal:

Waylon was selling, if we were lucky, two hundred and fifty thousand albums. Willie comes out with Red Headed Stranger and that took off and sold a million records. Jessi Colter put out "I'm Not Lisa" on Capitol. That damn thing sold half a million, or a million, set our butt on fire. We're sitting over there, trying to sell two hundred and fifty thousand records, and we're still struggling. Tompall had a damn record...I never went to one of their concerts, but I can imagine what it looked like, them running up and down the highway doing that.

Bradley approached Jennings about compiling some of his recordings with some old Nelson songs and calling it Wanted! The Outlaws. Jennings okayed the project on the condition that a couple of Glaser tracks be included. Jennings later remarked, "I liked Jerry, but he drove me a little nuts. He didn't have a clue about music, though he always tried to get involved in it, usually by remote control...He was a good merchandiser, though..." Once he got the green light, Bradley went "all in" on the outlaw concept. As author Michael Streissguth observes, "Bradley hired Rolling Stone's Chet Flippo (who would write Jerry Bradley's entry in The Encyclopedia of Country Music in 1998) to pen liner notes, and looked to a Time Life book about the American West as inspiration for the album's iconic album cover, which featured photographs of Colter, Glaser, Jennings, and Nelson on a parched, bullet-riddled wanted poster. In the 2003 documentary Beyond Nashville, Chet Flippo recalled, "The appearance and the marketing of the album were extremely important in making a Nashville album look hip for the first time." In the same film Tompall Glaser stated, "People were so hungry for something different than what was on the radio that they just ate it up. And it sold a million in the first two weeks and it went on up to five million." Jennings, who always viewed the outlaw image with a degree of cynicism, conceded in the audio version of his autobiography Waylon that the movement was rooted in musical integrity:

The cover was pure Old West—Dodge City and Tombstone. Now, we weren't just playing bad guys; we took our stand outside the country music rules, its set ways, locking the door on its own jail cell. We looked like tramps..."Don't fuck with me," was what we were tryin' to say...We loved the energy of rock and roll, but rock had self destructed. Country had gone syrupy. For us, "outlaw" meant standing up for your rights, your own way of doing things. It felt like a different music, and outlaw was as good a description as any. We mostly thought it was funny; Tompall immediately made up outlaw membership certificates...RCA was delighted...At last, an image!

In Nelson's 1988 autobiography Willie, Glaser stated, "Everybody rushed out to buy the Outlaws album: rock and rollers, kids, lockjaw types from the East, people who'd never bought a country album in their whole lives bought that album...Ultimately, I think the outlaw movement or publicity or gimmick or whatever you want to call it did a great thing for country music as a whole, because it opened the way for different styles."

== Recordings ==
Although many of the songs included on Wanted: The Outlaws were several years old and featured a plethora of producers, the unifying outlaw theme gave the album a cohesion and freshness it might have otherwise lacked. Although the album was predominately upbeat, it begins with the brooding "My Heroes Have Always Been Cowboys," which laments the loneliness of outlaw life as much as it celebrates the freedom of it. In the audio version of his autobiography, Jennings confessed, "It was an oddly downbeat way to start an album, but it seemed to sum up the frontier loneliness that often came hand-in-hand with our ideas of rugged individualism." Nelson would take the song to #1 in 1980 when it appeared on the soundtrack to The Electric Horseman. Jennings also sings Billy Joe Shavers's "Honky Tonk Heroes," the title cut from his classic 1973 LP about "lovable losers" and "no account boozers" who "danced holes in (their) shoes." Nostalgic themes are also found in Nelson's "Yesterday's Wine," the title track from his 1971 concept album of the same name. Nelson's other solo track, "Me and Paul," which also appeared on the Yesterday's Wine album, seemed to echo the outlaw ethos with its tales of suspicious cops, drug busts and lines like, "We'd come to play and not just for the ride." In keeping with the cowboy theme, Glaser tips his hat to Jimmie Rodgers on a rousing version of "T For Texas" and provides some comic relief with the Shel Silverstein nugget "Put Another Log on the Fire." Contrasting with these songs, Colter's selections, including "I'm Looking For Blue Eyes" and "You Mean to Say," address themes of loneliness and heartbreak. Jennings' and Colter's duet on "Suspicious Minds" had originally been released in 1970; at that time the song peaked at #25 on the Billboard country singles chart but, upon its rerelease in 1976, shot up to #2.

The biggest hit single from the album was the Jennings-Nelson duet of "Good Hearted Woman"; it peaked at number one on Billboard's Hot Country Singles and at number 25 on the Billboard Hot 100. It was also awarded with the Single of the Year award by the Country Music Association. Largely written by Jennings, it had served as the title track of his 1972 album and had also been recorded by Nelson for his LP The Words Don't Fit the Picture, also released that same year. According to Joe Nick Patoski's 2008 memoir Willie Nelson, the live performance of "Good Hearted Woman" on Wanted: The Outlaws was recorded at Geno McCoslin's Western Place in Dallas, although there has been speculation that the track was a studio creation because of what appears to be canned audience applause. In reality, Nelson's vocal was overdubbed onto the edited track, which appeared in its original form on Jennings' 1976 live album Waylon Live.

In 1984, RCA reissued the original 11 track album on compact disc. By 1988, the original CD issue was deleted, and RCA issued a truncated version of the album on CD, omitting Waylon & Jessi's "Suspicious Minds", Tompall Glaser's "Put Another Log On The Fire" and Waylon's "Honky Tonk Heroes". The reasons for the deletions are unknown to this day. Wanted! The Outlaws was reissued on CD and cassette tape by RCA for a third time in 1996 (as the remastered 20th Anniversary edition) with all 11 original tracks restored, and augmented with 10 bonus tracks. Only one of these, Steve Earle's "Nowhere Road", had previously been unreleased.

== Critical reception ==
Professional ratings
Review scores
Source	Rating
AllMusic	4.5/5 stars
Christgau's Record Guide	B+

At the time of the album's release, Joe Nick Patoski of Country Music wrote, "Most of the tracks are from a period when the first seeds of experimentation began to spill in Music City. Thus, a constant clash of traditional and innovative influences dominates each artist's selections, in most instances, finely woven lyrics hiding behind still slick studio concepts." In 2014, Stephen Bletts of Rolling Stone described the album as, "Raucous, rebellious and decidedly uninterested in the blend of pop and country that was storming the charts at the time..." Kurt Wolff of AllMusic observes, "it marked the industry's recognition of the changing times, and as the center point of a campaign to publicize Nashville's new "progressive" breed, it worked like a charm."

== Commercial performance ==
Wanted! The Outlaws reached at No. 1 on Billboard's Top Country Albums chart where it stayed for six weeks. In November 1976, it became the first country album to be awarded the platinum certification by RIAA, which introduced the platinum certification that year.

== Track listing ==
=== Side one ===
1. "My Heroes Have Always Been Cowboys" (Sharon Vaughn) – 2:48 (previously unreleased)
  - Performed by Jennings
2. "Honky Tonk Heroes" (Billy Joe Shaver) – 3:27 (new vocal and instrumental parts added to 1973 recording)
  - Performed by Jennings
3. "I'm Looking For Blue Eyes" (Jessi Colter) – 2:15 (previously unreleased)
  - Performed by Colter
4. "You Mean to Say" (Colter) – 2:28 (alternate mix of 1971 single)
  - Performed by Colter
5. "Suspicious Minds" (Mark James) – 3:55 (new vocal parts added to 1970 recording)
  - Performed by Jennings and Colter

=== Side two ===
1. "Good Hearted Woman" (Waylon Jennings, Willie Nelson) – 2:56 (live version previously unreleased, released later without Willie's overdubbed vocal)
  - Performed by Jennings and Nelson
2. "Heaven or Hell" (Nelson) – 1:37 (originally issued in 1974)
  - Performed by Jennings and Nelson
3. "Me and Paul" (Nelson) – 3:45 (remix of 1971 track)
  - Performed by Nelson
4. "Yesterday's Wine" (Nelson) – 2:58 (remix of 1971 track with added vocal parts)
  - Performed by Nelson
5. "T for Texas" (Jimmie Rodgers) – 4:12 (previously unreleased)
  - Performed by Tompall Glaser
6. "Put Another Log on the Fire (Male Chauvinist National Anthem)" (Shel Silverstein) – 2:16 (previously released in 1974)
  - Performed by Glaser

=== Bonus tracks (20th anniversary reissue) ===
1. "Slow Movin' Outlaw" (Dee Moeller) – 3:39 (previously released in 1974)
  - Performed by Jennings
2. "I'm a Ramblin' Man" (Ray Pennington) – 2:44 (previously released in 1974)
  - Performed by Jennings
3. "If She's Where You Like Livin' (You Won't Feel at Home with Me)" (Colter) – 2:51 (previously released in 1970)
  - Performed by Colter
4. "It's Not Easy" (Frankie Miller) – 3:10 (previously released in 1970)
  - Performed by Colter
5. "Why You Been Gone So Long" (Mickey Newbury) – 3:04 (previously released in 1970)
  - Performed by Colter
6. "Under Your Spell Again" (Buck Owens, Dusty Rhodes) – 2:55 (mono single mix released 1971)
  - Performed by Jennings and Colter
7. "I Ain't the One" (Colter) – 2:09 (mono single mix released 1970)
  - Performed by Jennings and Colter
8. "You Left a Long, Long Time Ago" (Nelson) – 2:37 (originally released 1971, version presented here is a 1981 remix with added instruments)
  - Performed by Nelson
9. "Healing Hands of Time" (Nelson) – 2:21 (previously released in 1965)
  - Performed by Nelson
10. "Nowhere Road" (Steve Earle, Reno Kling) – 2:42
  - Performed by Jennings and Nelson

== Personnel ==
- Jessi Colter - vocals
- Tompall Glaser - vocals
- Waylon Jennings - vocals
- Willie Nelson - vocals

also

- Richard Bennett - guitar, mando-guitar
- Steve Earle - acoustic guitar
- Ray Kennedy - tambourine
- Greg Morrow - drums
- Mickey Raphael - bass harmonica
- Garry Tallent - bass
- Robby Turner - pedal steel guitar
