= I'm Jessi Colter =

Album by Jessi Colter

Studio album by Jessi Colter
- Released: January 1975
- Studios: Glaser Sound (Nashville, Tennessee); Sound Factory (Hollywood, California)
- Genre: Country
- Label: Capitol
- Producers: Ken Mansfield; Waylon Jennings

Jessi Colter chronology
A Country Star Is Born (1970)	I'm Jessi Colter (1975)	Jessi (1976)

Singles from I'm Jessi Colter
- 1. "I'm Not Lisa" Released: January 6, 1975; 2. "What's Happened to Blue Eyes"/ "You Ain't Never Been Loved" Released: August 4, 1975

Professional ratings
Review scores
Source	Rating
AllMusic	4/5 stars

I'm Jessi Colter is the second studio album by American country music artist, Jessi Colter. The album was released on Capitol Records in January 1975 and was produced by Ken Mansfield. The release contained the single, "I'm Not Lisa," which peaked at No. 1 on the country chart and No. 4 on the Billboard Hot 100.

== Background ==
I'm Jessi Colter was Colter's first studio album for the Capitol label. The album spawned two major hits: "I'm Not Lisa," which became Colter's first major hit, and "What's Happened to Blue Eyes," which peaked at No. 5 on the Billboard Country Chart. The two singles were Colter's only solo Top 10 singles. The latter's B-side, "You Ain't Never Been Loved (Like I'm Gonna Love You)" peaked at No. 64 on the Billboard Hot 100 in 1975.

Colter's album was enormously successful, peaking at No. 4 on the Top Country Albums chart and No. 50 on the Billboard 200 albums chart. The release was given a positive review from AllMusic, which gave the album four out of five stars.

== Track listing ==
All songs composed by Jessi Colter:

1. "Is There Any Way (You'd Stay Forever)" — 2:45
2. "I Hear a Song" — 2:43
3. "Come on In" — 2:30
4. "You Ain't Never Been Loved (Like I'm Gonna Love You)" — 2:57
5. "Love's the Only Chain" — 3:16
6. "I'm Not Lisa" — 3:23
7. "For the First Time" — 2:38
8. "Who Walks Thru' Your Memory (Billy Jo)" — 2:20
9. "What's Happened to Blue Eyes" — 2:19
10. "Storms Never Last" — 4:14

== Personnel ==
Recorded at Glaser Sound Studios in Nashville, Tennessee, United States, and Sound Factory in Los Angeles, California, United States.

- Jessi Colter — lead vocals
- Lea Jane Berinati — backing vocals
- Tommy Cogbill — bass
- Johnny Gimble — fiddle
- Duke Goff — bass
- Jim Gordon — horn
- Dick Hyde — horn
- Waylon Jennings — producer, guitar
- Mack Johnson — horn
- Bruce King — backing vocals (track 3)
- Ken Mansfield — producer
- Marge McMahon — backing vocals
- Lee Montgomery — backing vocals
- Ralph Mooney — steel guitar
- Larry Muhoberac — piano, strings
- Weldon Myrick — steel guitar
- Elmo Peeler — strings
- Billy Ray Reynolds — backing vocals
- Wendy Suits — backing vocals
- John Buck Wilkins — guitar, backing vocals
- Marijohn Wilkin — backing vocals
- Sharon Vaughn — backing vocals
- Reggie Young — guitar

== Charts ==
=== Weekly charts ===
Chart (1975)	Peak position
US Billboard 200	50
US Top Country Albums (Billboard)	4

=== Year-end charts ===
Chart (1975)	Position
US Top Country Albums (Billboard)	5

Singles - Billboard (United States), RPM (Canada)

Year	Single	Chart	Position
1975	"I'm Not Lisa"	Country Singles	1
1975	"I'm Not Lisa"	Pop Singles	4
1975	"I'm Not Lisa"	Adult Contemporary Singles	16
1975	"I'm Not Lisa"	Canadian Country Singles	1
1975	"I'm Not Lisa"	Canadian Pop Singles	6
1975	"I'm Not Lisa"	Canadian Adult Contemporary Singles	1
1975	"What's Happened to Blue Eyes"	Country Singles	5
1975	"What's Happened to Blue Eyes"	Pop Singles	57
1975	"What's Happened to Blue Eyes"	Canadian Country Singles	11
1975	"You Ain't Never Been Loved (Like I'm Gonna Love You)"	Pop Singles	64
1975	"You Ain't Never Been Loved (Like I'm Gonna Love You)"	Canadian Pop Singles	65
