= Jessi (album) =

Studio album by Jessi Colter
- Released: January 1976
- Studio: Woodland (Nashville, Tennessee)
- Genre: Country
- Label: Capitol
- Producer: Ken Mansfield

Jessi Colter chronology
I'm Jessi Colter (1975)	Jessi (1976)	Wanted! The Outlaws (1976)

Singles from Jessi
- 1. "It's Morning (And I Still Love You)" Released: December 8, 1975; 2. "Without You" Released: March 29, 1976

Professional ratings
Review scores
Source	Rating
AllMusic	4.5/5 stars

Jessi is the third studio album released by American country music artist Jessi Colter. It was her second release for Capitol Records and was produced by Ken Mansfield and husband, Waylon Jennings. It was recorded September–October 1975 at Woodland Sound Studios in Nashville and released in January 1976, becoming one of two albums issued by Colter in 1976.

== Background ==
Jessi was released following the success of Colter's country pop crossover hit, "I'm Not Lisa" and all of the songs on the album were written entirely by Colter. The album spawned one major hit, "It's Morning (And I Still Love You)," which peaked at No. 11 on the Hot Country Songs chart in early 1976. Its second single, "Without You" did not make the Top 40. The album peaked at No. 4 on the Top Country Albums chart and No. 109 on the Billboard 200 albums chart.

AllMusic reviewed Jessi and gave it four and a half out of five stars. Reviewer Jim Worbois stated that he was surprised that "this record wasn't more popular than it was. Many of these songs are better than her big hit."

== Track listing ==
All songs composed by Jessi Colter.

1. "The Hand That Rocks the Cradle" – 3:08
2. "One Woman Man" – 4:23
3. "It's Morning (And I Still Love You)" – 2:20
4. "Rounder" – 3:47
5. "Here I Am" – 3:41
6. "Without You" – 3:56
7. "Darlin' It's Yours" – 3:06
8. "Would You Walk with Me (To the Lillies)" – 3:00
9. "All My Life, I've Been Your Lady" – 3:36
10. "I See Your Face (In the Morning's Window)" – 3:28

== Personnel ==
- Jessi Colter – lead vocals, keyboards
- Ritchie Albright – drums
- Duke Goff – bass
- Jim Gordon – horn
- Sherman Hayes – bass
- Dick Hyde – trombone
- Waylon Jennings – guitar, backing vocals
- Mackinley Johnson – trumpet
- Ken Mansfield – producer
- Ralph Mooney – pedal steel guitar
- Larry Muhoberac – piano
- Larry Murray – dulcimer
- Randy Scruggs – banjo, guitar
- Reggie Young – guitar

== Charts ==
Album – Billboard (North America), RPM (Canada)

Year	Chart	Position
1976	Country Albums	4
1976	Pop Albums	109
1976	Canadian Albums	87

Singles - Billboard (United States), RPM (Canada)

Year	Single	Chart	Position
1976	"It's Morning (And I Still Love You)"	Country Singles	11
1976	"It's Morning (And I Still Love You)"	Canadian Country Singles	20
1976	"Without You"	Country Singles	50
1976	"Without You"	Canadian Country Singles	38
