= Out of the Ashes (Jessi Colter album) =

Studio album by Jessi Colter
- Released: February 28, 2006
- Genre: Country
- Label: Shout! Factory
- Producer: Don Was

Jessi Colter chronology
Jessi Colter Sings Just for Kids: Songs from Around the World (1996)	Out of the Ashes (2006)	The Psalms (2017)

Out of the Ashes is the 11th studio album by American country artist Jessi Colter, released in 2006 on Shout! Factory Records. It was Colter's first album in 10 years, and her first country music album in 22 years since 1984's Rock and Roll Lullaby. It was also her first release since 1981 to chart on the Top Country Albums chart, where it reached #61. It was the first album by Colter to be released following the death of her husband and country artist, Waylon Jennings. The title of the album, Out of the Ashes, explains the message that she has remained an artist without the help of Jennings.

== Content ==
Out of the Ashes consisted of twelve tracks that mixed the genres of country, blues, gospel, and rock. The album was produced by Don Was, who had previously worked with The Rolling Stones and Bob Dylan. The release includes guest appearances from son Shooter Jennings and Tony Joe White. It also includes an unreleased song Colter collaborated on with Jennings in the late 1980s called "Out of the Rain." Before recording the album, Colter specifically went to Don Was with a few songs she had written and asked him what he thought. After telling Colter he was unsure about the songs, she returned to Was with more songs and shortly afterwards, they recorded the album. Six of the songs were written entirely by Colter, four were co-written by her, and two were cover versions of songs: the Gospel song, "His Eye is on the Sparrow" and Bob Dylan's "Rainy Day Women No. 12 and 35."

== Critical reception ==
Professional ratings
Review scores
Source	Rating
Allmusic	4/5 stars
About.com	3.5/5 stars

Allmusic critic, Thom Jurek gave Out of the Ashes a positive review, giving it four out of five stars. Jurek praised the album overall, stating, "Out of the Ashes is a great reflection of the music's tradition, from church pew to the barrom to the lovers' bedroom." Jurek also went on to say, "It is -- after all this time, and six previously celebrated offerings -- the record Colter has been waiting to make all her life and better than anyone ever had any right to expect."

Kathy Coleman of about.com gave Out of the Ashes three and a half out of five stars. Even though the album was given a fairly average rating compared to allmusic's, Coleman gave the release positive feedback instead of constructive criticism. Coleman explained how the release of the album helped Colter overcome Jennings's death, emerging her "from grief into a renewed life." Coleman called the track, "The Phoenix Rises" to sound like, "Jessi does indeed rise like the Phoenix from the ashes." She later summarized the album, stating, "Out of the Ashes is a beautiful record, and a new classic by a true legend."

Entertainment Weekly also reviewed the album. Unlike other websites, music reviewer, Marc Weingarten criticized Out of the Ashes, calling the album to, "sound more like something Rick Rubin might have worked on." Weingarten explained that he felt Colter's "70s sass is gone" and is instead replaced by, "a voice that sounds cured in gospel and cigarettes." Although he did criticize the release, Weingarten found her songwriting skills to be "still intact" for writing "bluesy" and "bittersweet" material.

== Track listing ==
All songs composed by Jessi Colter, except where noted.

1. "His Eye is on the Sparrow" – 3:58 (Civilla D. Martin, Charles H. Gabriel)
2. "You Can Pick 'Em" – 4:09 (Colter, Ray Herndon)
3. "Starman" – 4:23
4. "The Phoenix Rises" – 4:38
5. "Out of the Rain" – 4:47 (Tony Joe White)
  - featuring Waylon Jennings, Shooter Jennings, Tony Joe White, and the Greater Apostolic Christ Temple Choir
6. "Velvet and Steel" – 4:46
7. "Rainy Day Women No. 12 & 35" – 4:27 (Bob Dylan)
8. "You Took Me by Surprise" – 4:37
9. "So Many Things" – 2:57
10. "The Canyon" – 4:20
11. "Never Got Over You" – 3:55 (Colter, Herndon)
12. "Please Carry Me Home" – 5:51 (Colter, Shooter Jennings)
  - with Shooter Jennings

== Personnel ==
- Richie Albright – percussion, drums
- Mike Breen – engineer
- Jerry Bridges – bass guitar
- Alan Cartee – engineer
- Jessi Colter – piano, arranger, Wurlitzer
- Steve Crowder – engineer
- Greater Apostolic Christ Temple Choir – background vocals (track 5)
- Jeff Hale – drums
- Ray Herndon – guitar, background vocals
- Jim Horn – saxophone
- Shooter Jennings – background vocals, drums, producer
- Waylon Jennings – background vocals, guitar (track 5)
- Kurt Johnson – harmonica
- Ray Kennedy – bass guitar, organ, percussion
- Jeff Palo – producer
- Barny Robertson – bass guitar, drums, engineer, keyboards
- Carter Robertson – background vocals
- Robby Turner – Dobro, pedal steel guitar
- Don Was – producer, upright bass
- Tony Joe White – background vocals, guitar
- Jenny Lynn Young – cello
- Reggie Young – electric guitar

== Chart performance ==
Chart (2006)	Peak position
U.S. Billboard Top Country Albums	61
