= Jessi Colter Sings Just for Kids: Songs from Around the World =

Studio album by Jessi Colter
- Released: January 1, 1996
- Genre: Children's music
- Length: 30:54
- Label: Peter Pan
- Producer: Donald Kasen

Jessi Colter chronology
Rock and Roll Lullaby (1984)	Jessi Colter Sings Just for Kids: Songs from Around the World (1996)	The Very Best of Jessi Colter: An Outlaw...a Lady (2003)

Jessi Colter Sings Songs for Kids: Songs from Around the World is the 10th studio album by American country artist Jessi Colter, released in 1996 on Peter Pan Records, her first and only album of Children's music, and first studio album in 12 years. Her next album of new material, Out of the Ashes, would not be released until 2006.

== Background ==
Colter had previously been known as a country music artist, primarily popular in the 1970s and 1980s. She focused her career towards her first children's album in 1996. Colter starred in her own home video for the project, with a guest appearance from husband and country artist, Waylon Jennings, who recited some of his poetry for the first time. The album consisted of twenty one tracks of children's music from different parts of the world, including Europe and Latin America. The album would later be re-released by the album's label in 2000, retitled as Around the World.

== Track listing ==
1. "I'd Like to Sing with Kids" — 1:20
2. "La Cucaracha" — 1:30
3. "Old King Cole" — 2:00
4. "I'd Like to Teach the World to Sing (In Perfect Harmony)" — 1:44
5. "A Mouse Lived In A Windmill in Old Amsterdam" — 1:57
6. "The La La Song" — 2:37
7. "Octopus's Garden" — 2:33
8. "Mary Ann" — 2:10 (West Indies folk tune)
9. "Frère Jacques" — 0:44
10. "Babushka Baio" — 0:25 (Russian lullaby)
11. "Too-Ra-Loo-Ra-Loo-Ra (That's an Irish Lullaby)" — 2:36
12. "Twinkle, Twinkle Little Star" — 1:01
13. "This Land is Your Land" — 2:18
14. "Choo Choo Ba" — 1:33
15. "London Bridge" — 0:54
16. "Did You Ever See a Lassie" — 0:55
17. "Jasmine Flower" — 1:04 (Chinese folk tune)
18. "Bubbles and Bubbles" — 1:12
19. "Finiculi, Finicula" — 0:53
20. "He's Got the Whole World in His Hands" — 1:50
21. "Aloha Oe" — 1:17

== Personnel ==
- Jessi Colter — keyboards, lead vocals
- David Hummer — development
- Eric Lewandoski — creative director, design
- Waylon Jennings — guitar, vocals
- Donald Kasen — executive producer
