= Ridin' Shotgun =

Studio album by Jessi Colter
- Released: December 1981
- Genre: Country
- Label: Capitol
- Producer: Randy Scruggs; Waylon Jennings

Jessi Colter chronology
Leather and Lace (1981)	Ridin' Shotgun (1981)	Rock and Roll Lullaby (1984)

Singles from Ridin' Shotgun
- 1. "Somewhere Along the Way" Released: 1981; 2. "Holdin' on" Released: 1982; 3. "Ain't Makin' No Headlines" Released: 1982; 4. "Ridin' Shotgun" Released: 1982

Professional ratings
Review scores
Source	Rating
Allmusic	2.5/5 stars

Ridin' Shotgun is the eighth studio album released by American country music artist Jessi Colter, released in December 1981 by Capitol Records.

== Background ==
Ridin' Shotgun was produced by Randy Scruggs and Waylon Jennings (a country music artist and Colter's husband). It would be Colter's final studio album for Capitol Records after releasing six studio releases under the label. The album spawned four singles, which included her final charting single to date, "Holdin' on" (1982). The additional three singles released did not chart the Hot Country Songs list between 1981 and 1982. The album consisted of ten tracks, which included two versions of the title track. The album failed to chart among the Top Country Albums chart.

The album was reviewed by Allmusic and was given two and a half out of five stars.

== Track listing ==
1. "Ridin' Shotgun (Honkin')"
2. "Holdin' on"
3. "Nobody Else Like You"
4. "Somewhere Along the Way"
5. "Wings of My Victory"
6. "Ain't Makin' No Headlines (Here Without You)"
7. "Jennifer"
8. "Hard Times and Sno-cone"
9. "Fallen Star"
10. "Ridin' Shotgun (Tonkin')"

== Chart positions ==
Singles - Billboard (United States), RPM (Canada)

Year	Single	Chart	Position
1981	"Holdin' On"	Country Singles	70
