= A Country Star Is Born =

Studio album by Jessi Colter
- Released: April 1970
- Genre: Country
- Label: RCA Victor
- Producers: Chet Atkins; Waylon Jennings

Jessi Colter chronology
A Country Star Is Born (1970)	I'm Jessi Colter (1975)

Singles from A Country Star Is Born
- 1. "I Ain't the One" Released: 1969

Professional ratings
Review scores
Source	Rating
Allmusic	3/5 stars

A Country Star Is Born is the debut studio album by American country music artist, Jessi Colter. The album was released April 1970 by RCA Records, and was produced by Chet Atkins and Waylon Jennings.

== Background ==
Although Colter's husband Waylon Jennings was an RCA Victor recording artist and helped her secure a contract with the label, A Country Star Is Born was Colter's only album for RCA as a solo artist; she would not release another album until 1975, after signing with Capitol Records. A Country Star Is Born was co-produced by Jennings and Chet Atkins. One single was lifted from the album: "I Ain't the One," a duet with Jennings. However, the single failed to chart the Billboard Country Chart upon its release. The album consisted of eleven tracks, including cover versions of Patsy Cline's "He Called Me Baby," and Mickey Newbury's "Why You Been Gone So Long." It also included songs written by Colter, including the single release. The album did not make the Top Country Albums chart. It received three out of five stars in a review by Allmusic.

== Track listing ==
Source: ArtistDirect, Allmusic

1. "Too Many Rivers" (Harlan Howard) 2:30
2. "Cry Softly" (Mirriam Eddy) 2:56 [45 rpm single: 47-9826b]
3. "I Ain't the One" (Mirriam Eddy) 2:13 – with Waylon Jennings [45 rpm single: 74-0280b; 47-9920b]
4. "It's Not Easy" (Frankie Miller) 3:08
5. "He Called Me Baby" (Harlan Howard) 2:31
6. "Why You Been Gone So Long" (Mickey Newbury) 3:05
7. "If She's Where You Like Livin' (You Won't Feel at Home with Me)" (Mirriam Eddy) 2:46 [45 rpm single: 47-9826a]
8. "Healing Hands of Time" (Willie Nelson) 2:34
9. "That's the Chance I'll Have to Take" (Jackson King) 2:00
10. "Don't Let Him Go" (Mirriam Eddy) 2:21
11. "It's All Over Now" (Mirriam Eddy) 2:26

== Personnel ==
- Jessi Colter – keyboards, vocals

== Chart positions ==
Album – Billboard (North America),

Year	Chart	Position
1970	Country Albums	N/A

Singles – Billboard (United States)

Year	Single	Chart	Position
1969	"I Ain't the One"	Country Singles	N/A
