= Leather and Lace =

Studio album by Waylon Jennings and Jessi Colter
- Released: February 1981
- Recorded: October 1969, November-December 1980
- Studios: RCA Studios, Nashville, TN; Pantheon Recording Studio, Paradise Valley, AZ
- Genre: Country
- Label: RCA Victor
- Producers: Waylon Jennings; Richie Albright

Waylon Jennings chronology
Music Man (1980)	Leather and Lace (1981)	Black on Black (1982)

Jessi Colter chronology
That's the Way a Cowboy Rocks and Rolls (1978)	Leather and Lace (1981)	Ridin' Shotgun (1981)

Leather and Lace is a duet album by Waylon Jennings and Jessi Colter, released on RCA Records in 1981.

== Reception ==
Professional ratings
Review scores
Source	Rating
Allmusic	3/5 stars

Leather and Lace peaked at No. 11 on Billboard's country albums chart. AllMusic: "The outlaw movement had run its course by the time Leather and Lace was made, so Colter and Jennings were free to make their overdue duet album without having to prop up that particular facade. The result is an enjoyable half-hour of husband-and-wife music, comfortable as an old shoe."

== Track listing ==
1. "You Never Can Tell (C'est la Vie)" (Chuck Berry)
2. "Rainy Seasons" (Colter, Basil McDavid)
3. "I'll Be Alright" (Jennings, Jerry Bridges, Michael Lawley)
4. "The Wild Side of Life"/"It Wasn't God Who Made Honky Tonk Angels" (William Warren, Arlie A. Carter, J. D. "Jay" Miller)
5. "Pastels & Harmony" (Gordon Payne, Bee Spears)
6. "I Believe You Can" (Colter, Basil McDavid)
7. "What's Happened to Blue Eyes" (Colter)
8. "Storms Never Last" (Colter)
9. "I Ain't the One" (Miriam Eddy aka Jessi Colter)
10. "You're Not My Same Sweet Baby" (Mickey Newbury)

== Personnel ==
- Charlie McCoy
- Richie Albright
- Ralph Mooney
- Barney Robertson
- Gordon Payne
- Jessi Colter
- Waylon Jennings
- Sonny Curtis
- Jerry Bridges
- Bucky Wilkin
- Ken Buttrey
- Norbert Putnam
- Pete Wade
- Carter Robertson

== Chart performance ==
Chart (1981)	Peak position
U.S. Billboard Top Country Albums	11
U.S. Billboard 200	43

== Certifications ==
Region	Certification	Certified units/sales
United States (RIAA)	Gold	500,000^{^}
^{^} Shipments figures based on certification alone.
