= What's Happened to Blue Eyes =

Single by Jessi Colter

from the album I'm Jessi Colter
- B-side: "You Ain't Never Been Loved (Like I'm Gonna Love You)"
- Released: August 4, 1975
- Genre: Country
- Length: 2:19
- Label: Capitol
- Songwriter: Jessi Colter
- Producers: Ken Mansfield; Waylon Jennings

Jessi Colter singles chronology
| "I'm Not Lisa" (1975) | "What's Happened to Blue Eyes" (1975) | "It's Morning (And I Still Love You)" (1975) |

"What's Happened to Blue Eyes" is a song by American country music artist Jessi Colter. It was released on August 4, 1975, as a single from her album I'm Jessi Colter, peaking as a Top 10 hit on the Billboard Country Chart and a minor hit on the pop chart.

== Content ==
"What's Happened to Blue Eyes" was written entirely by Jessi Colter. The narrator discusses how she is looking for her male lover who goes by the name "blue eyes." She is curious if anyone has seen him, hoping he has not decided to end their relationship.

The song was produced by Ken Mansfield and Colter's husband Waylon Jennings, both of whom produced Colter's previous single, "I'm Not Lisa" and the associated album. Since its release, the song has been covered by Jennings as duet with Colter for their 1981 collaboration, Leather and Lace.

== Chart performance ==
"What's Happened to Blue Eyes" was released as Colter's second single on Capitol Records and was issued August 4, 1975. The song made its chart debut on the country list shortly afterwards on August 23. The song became Colter's second major hit as a solo recording artist, reaching a peak of #5 on the Billboard Hot Country Songs chart, as well as becoming a minor hit on the Pop chart, peaking at #57 around the same time. It would be released on her debut Capitol album, I'm Jessi Colter. The song was the follow-up single to Colter's major country pop crossover hit, "I'm Not Lisa", which was released earlier in the year.

== Critical reception ==
Billboard magazine reviewed the song favorably, saying that "when she writes, she turns out masterpieces, and then when she does the interpretation herself, it is superb. This is a case in point."

=== Charts ===
| Chart (1975) | Peak position |
|---|---|
| U.S. Billboard Hot Country Singles | 5 |
| U.S. Billboard Hot 100 | 57 |
| Canadian RPM Country Singles | 11 |

== Cover Versions ==
- In 1981, Colter's husband, Waylon Jennings recorded the song on their 1981 duet album, Leather and Lace.
