= That's the Way a Cowboy Rocks and Rolls =

Studio album by Jessi Colter
- Released: November 1978
- Recorded: Caribou Ranch (Nederland, CO)
- Genre: Country
- Label: Capitol
- Producers: Richie Albright; Waylon Jennings

Jessi Colter chronology
Mirriam (1977)	That's the Way a Cowboy Rocks and Rolls (1978)	Leather and Lace (1981)

Singles from That's the Way a Cowboy Rocks and Rolls
- 1. "Maybe You Should've Been Listening" Released: August 30, 1978; 2. "Love Me Back to Sleep" Released: 1979

Professional ratings
Review scores
Source	Rating
AllMusic	3/5 stars

That's the Way a Cowboy Rocks and Rolls is the fifth studio album by American country artist Jessi Colter. The album was released in November 1978 on Capitol Records and was produced by Richie Albright and Waylon Jennings. The title track was written by Tony Joe White.

== Background ==
That's the Way a Cowboy Rocks and Rolls contained ten tracks of new material. The album's first single, "Maybe You Should've Been Listening," only reached a peak of No. 45 on the Hot Country Songs chart in 1978, and the album's second single, "Love Me Back Sleep" peaked even lower on the chart in 1979. The album charted among the Top Country Albums list, reaching No. 46 upon its release in January 1978. The album's title track would later be covered and released as a single by country music artist, Jacky Ward in 1980, where it would reach No. 7 on the Hot Country Songs Chart.

Like Colter's previous releases, the album was co-produced by Waylon Jennings, a country artist and Colter's husband. He also helped serve as background vocals on the album as well.

== Track listing ==
1. "Roll On" (J. J. Cale) — 3:29
2. "Black Haired Boy" (Guy Clark, Susanna Clark) — 2:51
3. "I Was Kinda Crazy Then" (S. Clark) — 3:10
4. "That's the Way a Cowboy Rocks and Rolls" (Tony Joe White) — 3:20
5. "My Cowboy's Last Ride" (Johnny Cash) — 3:12
6. "Hold Back the Tears" (Neil Young) — 3:00
7. "Maybe You Should've Been Listening" (Buzz Rabin) — 4:35
8. "Don't You Think I Feel It Too" (David Ball)— 3:02
9. "Love Me Back to Sleep" (Zack Van Arsdale) — 2:26
10. "My Goodness" (Donnie Fritts, Spooner Oldham) — 5:00

== Personnel ==
Recorded at Jack Clements's Caribou Ranch American studio in Nederland, Colorado, United States.

- Richie Albright — drums, producer
- J. J. Cale — guitar
- Fred Carter — guitar
- Jessi Colter — keyboards, lead vocals
- Johnny Gimble — violin
- Sherman Hayes — bass
- Waylon Jennings — background vocals, guitar, producer
- Ralph Mooney — steel guitar
- Gordon Payne — guitar
- Clifford "Barny" Robertson — background vocals, keyboards
- Carter Robertson — background vocals
- Tony Joe White — guitar, harmonica

== Chart positions ==
Album – Billboard (North America)

Year	Chart	Position
1978	Country Albums	46

Singles - Billboard (United States)

Year	Single	Chart	Position
1978	"Maybe You Should've Been Listening"	Country Singles	45
1979	Love Me Back to Sleep	Country Singles	91
