= Rock and Roll Lullaby (album) =

Studio album by Jessi Colter
- Released: 1984
- Genre: Country
- Label: Triad
- Producer: Chips Moman

Jessi Colter chronology
Ridin' Shotgun (1981)	Rock and Roll Lullaby (1984)	Jessi Colter Sings Just for Kids: Songs from Around the World (1996)

Singles from Rock and Roll Lullaby
- 1. "I Want to Be with You" Released: 1984

Professional ratings
Review scores
Source	Rating
Allmusic	2/5 stars

Rock and Roll Lullaby is the ninth studio album by American country artist Jessi Colter, released in 1984 by Triad Records, her first and only release for the label.

This release ended up being her last album of new material for 12 years - it was followed in 1996 by an album of children's songs - and her last album of new country recordings for 22 years.

== Background ==
Colter's first album since 1981's Ridin' Shotgun, it was also her first album since her departure from Capitol Records. The release consisted of ten tracks, which included both new tracks and cover versions of other songs, including covers of The Davis Sisters's "I Forgot More Than You'll Ever Know," Lena Horne's "Stormy Weather," and Don Gibson's "I Can't Stop Loving You." The album spawned one single, "I Want to Be with You," which failed to chart the Hot Country Singles chart upon its release. In addition, Rock and Roll Lullaby did not chart among the Top Country Albums list.

The effort was reviewed by Allmusic and was only given two out of five stars.

== Track listing ==
1. "Rock and Roll Lullaby"
2. "Wild and Blue"
3. "Stormy Weather"
4. "I Want to Be with You"
5. "I Forgot More Than You'll Ever Know"
6. "I'm Going by Daydream"
7. "Partners After All"
8. "Easy Street"
9. "I Can't Stop Loving You"
10. "Tiger"
