= Chet Flippo =

American music journalist and biographer

- Born: Chester White Flippo; October 21, 1943; Fort Worth, Texas, U.S.
- Died: June 19, 2013 (aged 69); Nashville, Tennessee, U.S.
- Occupations: Music journalist, biographer

Chester White "Chet" Flippo (October 21, 1943 – June 19, 2013) was an American music journalist and biographer.

== Biography ==
Born in Fort Worth, Texas, he graduated from Sam Houston State University in 1965, serving thereafter in the U.S. Navy in intelligence. He also worked for local newspapers in Texas before gaining a master's degree in journalism from the University of Texas at Austin in 1974. He joined the staff of Rolling Stone as a contributing editor, becoming its New York bureau editor in 1974, and senior editor in 1977 when it moved its headquarters to New York. During the 1970s, Flippo interviewed and wrote extensively on many of the rock stars of the era, including John Lennon, Bob Dylan, and the Rolling Stones. Notably, in the early and mid 1970s he wrote approvingly about such country musicians as Willie Nelson, Waylon Jennings, and Dolly Parton, helping to facilitate their crossover appeal to a wider rock-oriented audience.

He left Rolling Stone in 1980 to write books of music biography. These included Your Cheatin' Heart, a biography of Hank Williams, published in 1981. He also contributed to The New York Times, Texas Monthly and Q magazine. He later moved to Tennessee, where he taught journalism at the University of Tennessee at Knoxville between 1991 and 1994, and became the Nashville bureau chief for Billboard magazine. In 1998 he received the Country Music Association's Media Achievement Award. In 2001, he joined Country Music Television (CMT) as its editorial director, and wrote the influential column Nashville Skyline.

He died in Nashville in 2013, from pneumonia after a long illness, aged 69.

== Bibliography ==
- Your Cheatin' Heart: A Biography of Hank Williams (1981)
- On the Road With the Rolling Stones: 20 Years of Lipstick, Handcuffs and Chemicals (1985)
- Yesterday: The Unauthorized Biography of Paul McCartney (1989)
- It's Only Rock 'n' Roll: My On-the-Road Adventures With the Rolling Stones (1989)
- Everybody Was Kung-Fu Dancing: Chronicles of the Lionized and the Notorious (1991)
- Graceland: The Living Legacy of Elvis Presley (1993)
