= I'm Not Lisa =

1975 single by Jessi Colter

Single by Jessi Colter

from the album I'm Jessi Colter
- B-side: "For the First Time"
- Released: January 16, 1975
- Recorded: 1974
- Genre: Country
- Length: 3:19
- Label: Capitol
- Songwriter: Jessi Colter
- Producers: Ken Mansfield; Waylon Jennings

Jessi Colter singles chronology
"Under Your Spell Again" (1971)	"I'm Not Lisa" (1975)	"What's Happened to Blue Eyes" (1975)

"I'm Not Lisa" is the most successful song by American country music artist Jessi Colter. It was released on January 16, 1975, as the lead single from her album I'm Jessi Colter. The song hit number 1 on the country charts in the US and Canada, and it crossed over to number 4 on the Billboard pop chart. The plaintive love song was Colter's first major hit as a solo artist, following more than ten years of country music performances. The song is Colter's only foray into the pop Top 40, technically giving her a one-hit wonder status despite her multiple country chart hits.

Following this, Colter sang outlaw country duets with her husband Waylon Jennings on the compilation album Wanted! The Outlaws, and she continued her solo career with the album Jessi, both released in January 1976.

== Content ==
"I'm Not Lisa" was written by Colter and describes the pain that comes with dating someone who has not gotten over a previous lover. The previous lover, named Lisa, was taken away by "His hand", which implies that she died and was led away by God. The song is sung from the perspective of the man's current lover named Julie who laments the fact that he cannot get over Lisa.

While singing on the recording of the original version of the song, Colter also played the song's piano accompaniment. The song was produced by Ken Mansfield and Colter's husband, Waylon Jennings. Both men would also produce Colter's 1975 album, as well as her further releases for Capitol records.

== Critical reception ==
In 2024, Rolling Stone ranked the song at #140 on its 200 Greatest Country Songs of All Time ranking.

== Chart performance ==
"I'm Not Lisa" was released on Capitol Records on January 16, 1975, making its debut on the country chart February 15, 1975. The song became Colter's commercial breakthrough as a solo artist, peaking at number 1 on the Billboard Hot Country Songs chart. however failing to have broader mainstream appeal, only peaking at number 4 on Billboard's Hot 100, falling short of the success it had on the Country charts. The song was subsequently ranked number 41 on its Year-End Hot 100 singles of 1975. In addition, the song also reached number 16 on the Hot Adult Contemporary Tracks chart, and was released on Colter's debut Capitol album, I'm Jessi Colter. The song earned Colter a Grammy Award nomination in the category of Best Female Country Vocal Performance and a Country Music Association Awards nomination.

"I'm Not Lisa" became Colter's signature tune and her only number 1 single.

=== Weekly charts ===
Chart (1975)	Peak position
Australia (Kent Music Report)	31
Austrian Top 40	17
Canadian RPM Country Singles	1
Canadian RPM Pop Singles	6
Canadian RPM Adult Contemporary Singles	1
New Zealand Singles Chart	17
South Africa (Springbok)	6
US Hot Country Songs (Billboard)	1
U.S. Billboard Hot 100	4
U.S. Billboard Easy Listening	16

=== Year-end charts ===
Chart (1975)	Rank
Canada RPM Pop Singles	39
U.S. Billboard Hot 100	41

== Cover versions ==
The song has since been covered by many artists, including Elizabeth Cook for her 2002 album Hey, Y'all. Robert L. Doerschuk of AllMusic praised Cook's cover for "affirm[ing] the power of unadulterated old-time country and Cook's complete command of this idiom". The rock band Killdozer also covered "I'm Not Lisa" on their 1986 release Burl.
