= Tompall Glaser =

American country singer (1933–2013)

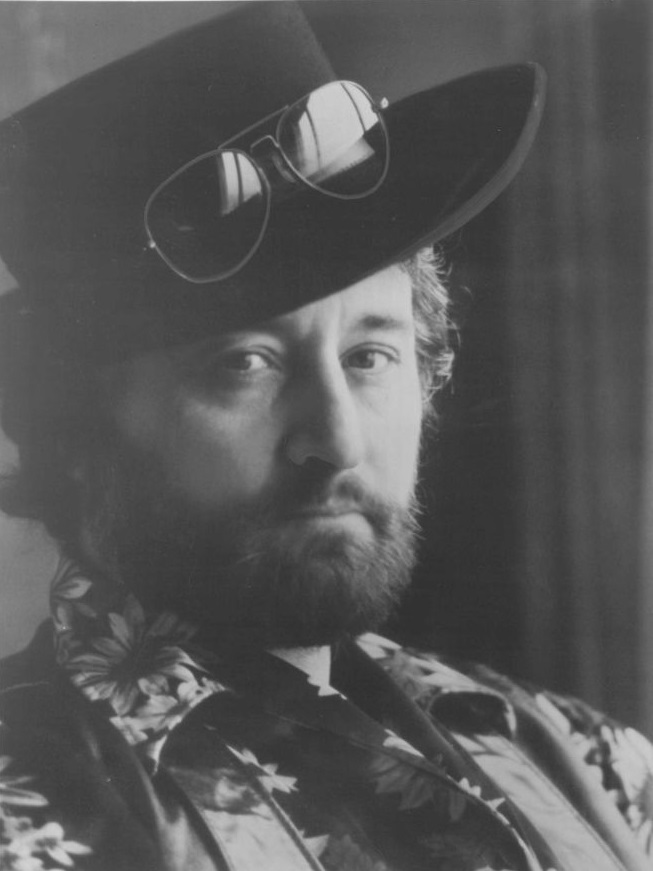
- Glaser in 1977

Background information
- Born: Thomas Paul Glaser; September 3, 1933; Spalding, Nebraska, U.S.
- Died: August 12, 2013 (aged 79) Nashville, Tennessee, U.S.
- Genres: Country; outlaw country; progressive country
- Occupation: Singer-songwriter
- Instruments: Vocals, guitar
- Years active: 1950–2013
- Labels: MGM/Curb, ABC, RCA Victor Dot/MCA, Bear Family, Clint Miller
- Formerly of: Tompall & the Glaser Brothers

Thomas Paul "Tompall" Glaser (September 3, 1933 – August 12, 2013) was an American country singer who was a key figure in the 1970s outlaw country movement.

== Biography ==
Glaser was born in Spalding, Nebraska, the son of Alice Harriet Marie (née Davis) and Louis Nicholas Glaser. He was raised on a farm along with his brothers Jim and Chuck. Growing up, Glaser and his brothers performed music in local venues and radio stations.

In the 1950s he recorded as a solo artist. He and his brothers later formed a trio, Tompall & the Glaser Brothers. In 1957 they performed on Arthur Godfrey's television show. They also shared the bill with Patsy Cline at The Mint casino in Las Vegas November-December 1962.

Glaser's highest-charting solo single was Shel Silverstein's "Put Another Log on the Fire,” which peaked at Billboard Hot Country Singles’ (now Hot Country Songs) No. 21 in 1975. He and his brothers also reached number 2 on the country charts with Lovin' Her Was Easier (than Anything I'll Ever Do Again).

Tompall co-produced Waylon Jennings's influential 1973 album Honky Tonk Heroes, one of outlaw country’s first albums. Honky Tonk Heroes has been called a "milestone album in the breaking of the Nashville studio/recording system, a true watershed event in the music business."

Tompall appeared with Willie Nelson, Waylon Jennings, and Jessi Colter on the 1976 album Wanted! The Outlaws, the first country album to be certified platinum.

In the 1970s his Nashville recording studio, Glaser Sound Studios, dubbed "Hillbilly Central," was considered the nerve center of the nascent outlaw country movement. Glaser ran the studio with his brothers and gave musicians control over what they recorded instead of their producers, unlike other Nashville studios of the time. Among the groundbreaking albums recorded at his studio were John Hartford's Aereo-Plain and Waylon Jennings' Dreaming My Dreams.

Glaser and his brothers also ran a music publishing company that allowed songwriters to retain ownership and control of their material, which was also unusual for the time period.

Glaser died on August 12, 2013, in Nashville, Tennessee, at the age of 79, after a long illness.

== Solo discography ==
=== Albums ===
Year	Album	US Country
1973	Charlie	—
1974	Take the Singer with the Song	—
1975	Tompall (Sings the Songs of Shel Silverstein)	—
1976	The Great Tompall and His Outlaw Band	13
1977	Tompall Glaser & His Outlaw Band	38
1977	The Wonder of It All	—
1986	Nights on the Borderline	—
1987	A Collection Of Love Ballads From World War Two	—
1992	The Rogue	—
1992	The Outlaw	—
2001	The Best of Tompall Glaser & the Glaser Brothers	—
2006	My Notorious Youth	—
2007	Outlaw to the Cross	—

=== Singles ===
Year	Single	Chart Positions			Album
Year	Single	US Country	US Bubbling	CAN Country	Album
1973	"Bad, Bad, Bad Cowboy"	77	—	—	Charlie
1974	"Texas Law Sez"	96	—	—	Take the Singer with the Song
1974	"Musical Chairs"	63	—	—	Tompall (Sings the Songs of Shel Silverstein)
1975	"Put Another Log on the Fire (The Male Chauvinist National Anthem)" (credited to Tompall)	21	3	34	Tompall (Sings the Songs of Shel Silverstein)
1976	"T for Texas" (credited to Tompall and His Outlaw Band)	36	—	—	Wanted! The Outlaws
1977	"It'll Be Her"	45	—	—	Tompall Glaser & and His Outlaw Band
1977	"It Never Crossed My Mind"	91	—	—	The Wonder of It All
1978	"Drinking Them Beers"	79	—	—	The Wonder of It All

== See also ==
- "Streets of Baltimore"
- Tompall & the Glaser Brothers
- Jim Glaser
