= Ken Mansfield =

American record producer (1937–2022)

- Born: October 14, 1937; Pennsylvania, U.S.
- Died: November 17, 2022 (aged 85)
- Occupations: Record producer, author
- Website: Main Mansfield: The Internet Home of Ken Mansfield

Ken Mansfield (October 14, 1937 – November 17, 2022) was an American record producer who was the manager of Apple Records in the United States. He was also a high-ranking executive for several record labels, as well as a songwriter, author of seven books and a Grammy and Dove Award-winning album producer.

From the 1960s, Mansfield was associated with an array of notable performers including The Beatles, The Beach Boys, Waylon Jennings, James Taylor, Roy Orbison, Don Ho, the Imperials, Tompall Glaser, Harry Nilsson, Glen Campbell, Buck Owens, Lou Rawls, Andy Williams, The Flying Burrito Brothers, Eric Burdon, Badfinger, Jackie Lomax, The Four Freshmen, Judy Garland, Dolly Parton, David Cassidy, Nick Gilder, Claudine Longet, and Jessi Colter. In the 1970s, he helped popularize the Outlaw movement in country music by producing Waylon Jennings' number one album, Are You Ready for the Country as well as the crossover number-one hit "I’m Not Lisa" by Jessi Colter. In 1990 he entered the Gospel Music arena and produced the legendary Imperials' Big God album and in 1991 produced Homecoming, the Gaither Vocal Band's Grammy and Dove Award-winning album. Then in 2000, the former record executive-turned-producer embarked on a literary career with The Beatles, The Bible and Bodega Bay (Broadman & Holman). His follow-up, The White Book - The Beatles, the Bands, the Biz: An Insider's Look at an Era (Thomas Nelson), was released in 2007. Mansfield's third book, Between Wyomings, (Thomas Nelson), was released on June 9, 2009. His fourth book, Stumbling On Open Ground (January 15, 2013), is also a Thomas Nelson Publication. Book number five, Rock and a Heart Place (May 1, 2015), is a Broadstreet Publishing Group, LLC publication. Mansfield penned his sixth book, the novel, "Philco" (May 29, 2018), by Post Hill Press and his seventh book, "The Roof: The Beatles' Final Concert" (November 13, 2018), also by Post Hill Press.

== Early life ==
Mansfield was born in Pennsylvania on October 14, 1937, the son of a sawmill worker and housewife. He grew up in Idaho, in a remote area in the northern panhandle of the state, known as the “Banana Belt” because of the comparatively moderate weather. Soon after graduating from high school, he joined the Navy to leave his small town roots behind.

Upon his discharge from active duty, Mansfield enrolled at the University of Idaho eventually transferring to San Diego State University, where he received a Bachelor of Science degree in Marketing. His first job was doing computerized cost, budget, and program analysis for the Saturn and Surveyor space programs in San Diego. At the same time, Mansfield sang with a folk group called The Town Criers and opened a nightclub in San Diego's suburb of La Mesa. The popular club, called The Land of Oden, was La Mesa’s former City Hall. He also managed the band The Deep Six.

== Capitol Records ==
Through his music contacts, Mansfield learned of a job opening at Capitol Records in Los Angeles. Armed with his marketing degree and a borrowed suit, he was interviewed and then hired in January 1965 as the company's District Promotion Manager West Coast, making him one of the youngest executives with the firm.

Mansfield was promoted quickly and was one of the first young American executives the Beatles worked with since their ascension to stratospheric stardom. Up until then, everyone they met in the executive world outside their isolated and insulated realm was a Lord of EMI (the parent company that owned Capitol Records), a corporate chairman or a high-ranking executive. Mansfield's age made him more accessible to the Beatles, who soon invited him to become a member of their inner sanctum.

In addition to the Beatles, while at Capitol, he was also responsible for overseeing the recording careers of the Beach Boys, Glen Campbell, The Band, Bobbie Gentry, Lou Rawls, Buck Owens, Merle Haggard, The Steve Miller Band, Bob Seger, and the Quicksilver Messenger Service.

== Apple Records ==
In 1967 when the Beatles decided to form their own corporation, they turned to Mansfield to run their record division and named him the U.S. Manager of Apple Records beginning in 1968. Mansfield joined his four new bosses setting up the worldwide launch of Apple Records and the U.S. management of subsequent projects such as The Beatles (a.k.a. The White Album), Yellow Submarine, Abbey Road, Let It Be and Hey Jude. In addition to the Beatles, Mansfield looked after the careers of Apple artists such as James Taylor, Mary Hopkin, Badfinger and Jackie Lomax.

At the time of the Apple debut, everyone agreed that the Beatles first single on the new label had to be a smash. The group was stymied on whether to release “Hey Jude” or “Revolution” as Apple's first single. “Hey Jude,” which clocked in at an unprecedented 7:11, was the obvious choice. However, it was still the era of the less than three-minute record and Top 40 stations gained listeners by playing the most hits in an hour. Mansfield came up with the solution by bringing an advance copy of the two songs from the UK to America and playing them to a few trusted radio station managers, who were unanimous in their decision that “Hey Jude” was the hit. They were right. When the song was released in September 1968, it topped the Billboard charts for nine weeks and became the Beatles' best selling single of all time.

In his position as an Apple executive and personal liaison for the Beatles between the UK and US, Mansfield was among a handful of eyewitnesses to join The Beatles as they performed their legendary last-ever gig on the rooftop of their London headquarters on January 30, 1969, which was captured in the Academy Award-winning documentary, Let It Be. Mansfield is easy to recognize as he was the only one on the roof that day wearing a white coat.

When the Apple empire began to crumble, Mansfield turned down an offer by businessman Allen Klein to stay despite the promise of his salary being tripled. Mansfield saw the writing on the wall and moved over to MGM Records as its vice president in charge of marketing and artist relations. Two years later he was hired by Andy Williams to be the president of his CBS record company, Barnaby Records in 1971 - an artist roster that over the years boasted Ray Stevens, Jimmy Buffett, the Everly Brothers, Paul Anka, Lenny Welch, and Claudine Longet.

Mansfield's tenure with Barnaby lasted two years (1971–73) chiefly because he wanted to take the label heavy into the emerging contemporary country market, which evolved into the exciting “Outlaw” movement. Williams saw things differently and Mansfield resigned over the dispute.

== Record producer ==
When Mansfield left CBS/Barnaby Records in 1973, he finally fulfilled his longtime career goal of becoming a full-time record producer. He set up Hometown Productions Inc. and went on to produce the acts that he wanted to bring to Barnaby Records – Waylon Jennings, Willie Nelson, Jessi Colter, Tompall Glaser and other cutting-edge and Outlaw country artists.

Mansfield's five-year producer tenure with the Outlaws started in 1973 with the hit single "We Had It All" from the classic Waylon Jennings album, Honky Tonk Heroes. Mansfield went on to produce approximately 70 songs for the Outlaws, including Jennings' No. 1 top-selling album Are You Ready for the Country and No. 1 single "Amanda" from his "Rambling Man" album, “A Couple More Years” with Waylon and Willie, as well as Jessi Colter's No. 1 crossover single, “I’m Not Lisa” and No. 1 albums "I'm Jessi Colter" and "Diamond in the Rough." A series of Top Ten albums and singles produced by Mansfield with both artists found a place on the charts and playlists in country and pop categories. The personal relationship between Jennings and Mansfield grew so close that one time the singer asked Mansfield if it would be OK to list him as next of kin on his emergency medical records.

Mansfield also produced The Flying Burrito Brothers, David Cassidy, Don Ho, Nick Gilder, Sam Neely, Byron Berline and Sundance, as well as David Geffen’s boy band OXO before closing down his Hollywood enterprise Hometown Productions Inc. and making his way to Nashville in the 1980s.

== Author ==
While the 1980s were a decade of prosperity for most Americans, they were not for Mansfield. Facing insurmountable debt, he was financially and spiritually broken when he arrived in Nashville in 1984.

After a born-again experience in the late 1980s, Mansfield rebounded in his personal and professional life. He produced the legendary Imperials and the Gaither Vocal Band's 1991 album, Homecoming. The Grammy Award-winning album featured a who's who of gospel artists including the Gaither Family, The Speer Family, Jake Hess, Hovie Lister, Howard and Vestal Goodman, George Younce, Glen Payne, James Blackwood, Eva Mae LeFevre, Buck Rambo, J.D. Sumner, The Stamps and Rudy and Larry Gatlin of The Gatlin Brothers. In addition, this classic recording received a Dove Award that same year.

The new millennium brought additional creative rewards to Mansfield, who penned The Beatles, The Bible and Bodega Bay in 2000. Published by Broadman & Holman, the work had three printings and was the only book ever approved by the Beatles (Yoko Ono on John Lennon's behalf) outside their own Anthology. That literary endeavor was followed by The White Book, The Beatles, the Bands, the Biz: An Insiders Look at an Era (Thomas Nelson) in 2007.

The White Book has been endorsed by many Apple/Beatles related people including The Rolling Stones' Andrew Loog Oldham, Peter Asher, Alan Parsons, Robin Leach, BeatlesandBeyond Radio show presenter Pete Dicks (who worked on the promotional video for the book) and former Apple President Jack Oliver.

Mansfield's third book, Between Wyomings, published by Thomas Nelson, was released on June 9, 2009.

Stumbling on Open Ground, his fourth, most heavily endorsed and insightful book is also a Thomas Nelson Publishing release (January 15, 2013), and reaches a whole new audience for Ken’s innovative writing approach.

Mansfield published his fifth book, Rock and a Heart Place, on May 1, 2015. Rock and a Heart Place has been called “a classic reminder that regardless what messes our family or friends might encounter, the Creator is greater; nobody is beyond hope, and there is no need to give up on anyone!” (Ken Abraham, New York Times bestselling author) and is a must-read for rock aficionados.

In 2018, Mansfield published two books with Post Hill Press, the novel, "Philco" on May 29, 2018, and "The Roof: The Beatles' Final Concert" on November 13, 2018.

== Personal life and death ==
Ken Mansfield died on November 17, 2022, at the age of 85.
