= Jessi Colter =

American country singer (born 1943)

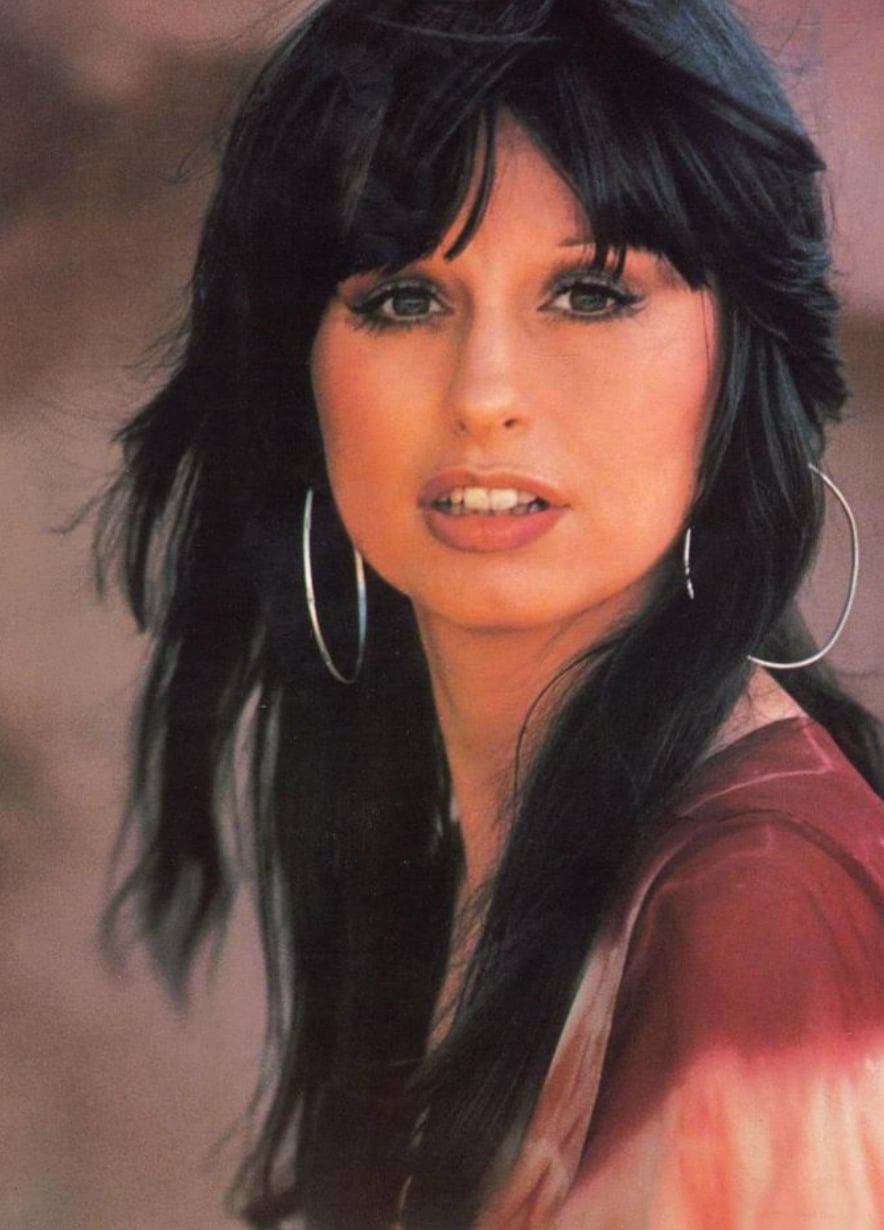
- Colter in a promotional image for Capitol Records in 1976

Background information
- Also known as: Mirriam Eddy; The First Lady of Outlaw Country
- Born: Miriam Rebecca Joan Johnson; May 25, 1943 (age 83); Phoenix, Arizona, U.S.
- Genres: Country; outlaw country; gospel; children's music; rock
- Occupations: Singer; songwriter; musician; producer; actress
- Instruments: Vocals; keyboard; piano
- Years active: 1961–present
- Labels: Black Country Rock Media; RCA; Capitol; Triad; Peter Pan; Shout! Factory
- Spouses: Duane Eddy (m. 1961; div. 1968) Waylon Jennings (m. 1969; died 2002) Arlin Brower (m. 2023)
- Children: 2, including Shooter Jennings
- Relatives: Struggle Jennings (grandson); Brianna Harness (great-granddaughter); Tommy Jennings (brother-in-law); Cowboy Jack Clement (brother-in-law)
- Website: officialjessicolter.com

Logo

Mirriam Rebecca Joan Brower (née Johnson; born May 25, 1943), known professionally as Jessi Colter, is an American country music singer who is best known for her collaborations with her second husband, Waylon Jennings, her solo albums I'm Jessi Colter, Jessi, and Diamond in The Rough, all of which broke into the US Billboard 200 in 1975 and 1976 respectively, as well as for her 1975 country-pop crossover hit "I'm Not Lisa".

Colter was one of the few female artists to emerge from the mid-1970s "outlaw country" movement. After meeting Jennings, Colter pursued a career in country music, releasing her first studio LP in 1970, A Country Star Is Born. Five years later, Colter signed with Capitol Records and released "I'm Not Lisa", which topped the country charts and reached the top five on the pop charts. In 1976, she was featured on the collaboration LP Wanted: The Outlaws, which became an RIAA-certified platinum album.

== Early life ==
Mirriam Johnson was born on May 25, 1943, in Phoenix, Arizona, and raised in a strict Pentecostal home. Her mother, Helen D Perkins Johnson, was a Pentecostal preacher and her father, Arnold Hobson Johnson, was a racecar driver. At age 11, Colter became the pianist at her church. After graduating from Mesa High School in 1961, she began singing in local clubs in Phoenix. After marrying guitarist Duane Eddy in 1961, and still using her real name of Mirriam Johnson, she released two singles that were issued on the Jamie label. The first, "Lonesome Road", received scattered airplay in several US markets, though not enough to make any national charts. After a second single failed to even get regional airplay, Johnson did not record again for nearly a decade. She continued to tour with Eddy until divorcing him in 1968. The following year, she met country artist Waylon Jennings, who helped her secure a recording contract with RCA Victor, and married him.

== Career ==
=== Early career: 1970–1974 ===
Johnson, now billing herself as "Jessi Colter", resumed her recording career in 1970. That year, Waylon Jennings and Colter sang duet on two top-40 country chart hits. On March 25, 1970, she played keyboard for her husband during his appearance on The Johnny Cash Show. She released her debut album, A Country Star Is Born, on RCA, with Jennings and Chet Atkins co-producing. The album was not successful and did not make an impact on the country music market. It was Colter's only album for RCA, and she left the label soon after, though her face appears on several of Jennings' record covers from this period.

=== Breakthrough success: 1975–1979 ===
In 1975, Colter signed with Capitol Records. On the label, she released her debut single, "I'm Not Lisa". The song was Colter's breakthrough single; it reached number one on the Billboard Country Chart, but only peaked at number four on the Billboard Pop Chart. Her second album, titled I'm Jessi Colter. was also released that year and reached number one on the Cashbox Top Country Albums chart, number four on the Billboard Country Albums Chart, and number 50 on the Billboard 200 Top 100 Pop Albums chart. The follow-up single from that same album, "What's Happened to Blue Eyes", was also very successful, peaking at number five on the Billboard country chart and number 57 on the pop chart. The single's B-side, "You Ain't Never Been Loved (Like I'm Gonna Love You)", charted among the Top Pop 100, also in 1975.

A survey of industry sources reveals that Capitol was releasing both "You Ain't Never Been Loved" and "What's Happened to Blue Eyes" as simultaneous singles for the pop and country markets. The confusion in marketing was made evident when programmers were uncertain of which single to play. Both sides of the same record scored on the Pop Top 100, but "What's Happened to Blue Eyes" powered into the Country Top 5. Capitol clearly recognized that a miscalculation had occurred and subsequently purchased full-page industry ads saying, "We've FLIPPED. What's Happened to Blue Eyes IS the single." It was too little, too late. With two competing singles marketed to radio, Capitol's risky move made certain that Colter would not naturally follow up the success of 'I'm Not Lisa' in the Pop Top 40.

The second single was nevertheless a huge country/pop success, and later that year, Colter launched a nationwide tour as part of Waylon Jennings' program at the Santa Monica Civic Auditorium. In 1976, Colter released her second and third Capitol studio albums, Jessi and Diamond in the Rough. Both albums were as successful as Colter's 1975 album, both debuting at No. 4 on the Top Country Albums chart. The lead single from her Jessi album, "It's Morning (And I Still Love You)" was a Top 15 country hit in 1976 on the country charts. Her second album that year, Diamond in the Rough produced only one charting single, "I Thought I Heard You Calling My Name". At this point, Colter had established herself as a big-selling "albums artist," rather than a casual honky-tonk hitmaker, given that her talents were far more inclined to soul-rock than to mundane country music. For the remainder of the decade, Colter toured with her husband, Waylon Jennings, and released her studio album Mirriam in 1977. She then released her next album, That's the Way a Cowboy Rocks and Rolls the following year. Her success began to decline through the remainder of the decade, with her final two albums of the decade not producing any Top 40 country hits.

=== Later music career: 1980–2002 ===
In 1981, Colter and her husband returned to release a duet album entitled Leather and Lace. The album's first single, "Storms Never Last", was written by Colter, and the second single, "The Wild Side of Life"/"It Wasn't God Who Made Honky Tonk Angels," was also a major hit in 1981, peaking at number 10 on the Billboard Country Chart. The album was certified gold in sales by the RIAA that year, Colter's second RIAA-certified album to date. Stevie Nicks wrote the title track of the album, but after receiving word that Colter and Jennings might divorce, Nicks released her own version of the song as a duet with Don Henley. It peaked at number six on pop chart, also in 1981. Also in 1981, Colter released her final studio album on Capitol records, Ridin' Shotgun, which also spawned Colter's last charting single on the country charts, "Holdin' On".

As the decade progressed, Colter's success began to decline. She released an album in 1984 on the Triad label titled Rock and Roll Lullaby, produced by Chips Moman. In the later years of the decade, though, she decided to let her recording career decline to help take care of and nurse her husband through his drug abuse and various medical problems. She remained active during this time.

In the early 1990s, she focused her attention on performing and released an album of children's music titled Jessi Colter Sings Just for Kids: Songs from Around the World in early 1996. It featured a guest appearance by Jennings, who recited some of his poetry for the video. In 2000, Colter performed on Jennings's live album Never Say Die, released two years before his death in 2002, at age 64.

=== Return to music: 2006–present ===
In 2006, Colter returned to recording with a new studio album released on the Shout! Factory label, Out of the Ashes. It was Colter's first studio album in over 20 years. The album was produced by Don Was and reflected on Jennings' death. Jennings had an unused vocal, "Out of the Rain," which was featured on the track.

The album was given many positive reviews, including Allmusic, which gave the album four out of five stars in 2006. Out of the Ashes was her first album since 1981 to chart on the Top Country Albums chart, peaking at No. 61. In 2007 Colter recorded a duet version of her 1975 hit "I'm Not Lisa" with Deana Carter on her 2007 album, The Chain. In 2017, Colter and Jan Howard provided guest vocals to a track appearing on Written in Song, an album by Jeannie Seely. The song, called "We're Still Hangin' In There Ain't We Jessi", references how Seely and Colter are seemingly two of the only women in country music who managed to have a successful marriage.

Colter's first album in 11 years, The Psalms, was released on March 24, 2017, by Legacy Recordings. The album consisted of Colter's favorite Book of Psalms passages put to music; it was produced by Lenny Kaye, who recalled an evening when Colter, Jennings, Patti Smith, and he were having dinner together in 1995 when Colter began to sing passages of the Bible. Kaye stated that he was "transfixed" and kept the evening in his mind until he convinced Colter to record those renditions in 2007, with the album being recorded over the course of two sessions, along with a further two in 2008. Of the album, Kaye stated, "we tried to choose songs that weren't about warring peoples, but more about comfort and reconciliation". On April 11, 2017, Colter released a tell-all memoir titled An Outlaw and a Lady: A Memoir of Music, Life with Waylon, and the Faith That Brought Me Home.

Her 12th solo album, Edge of Forever, was released on October 27, 2023. It was produced by Margo Price and mixed by Colter's son Shooter.

== Personal life ==
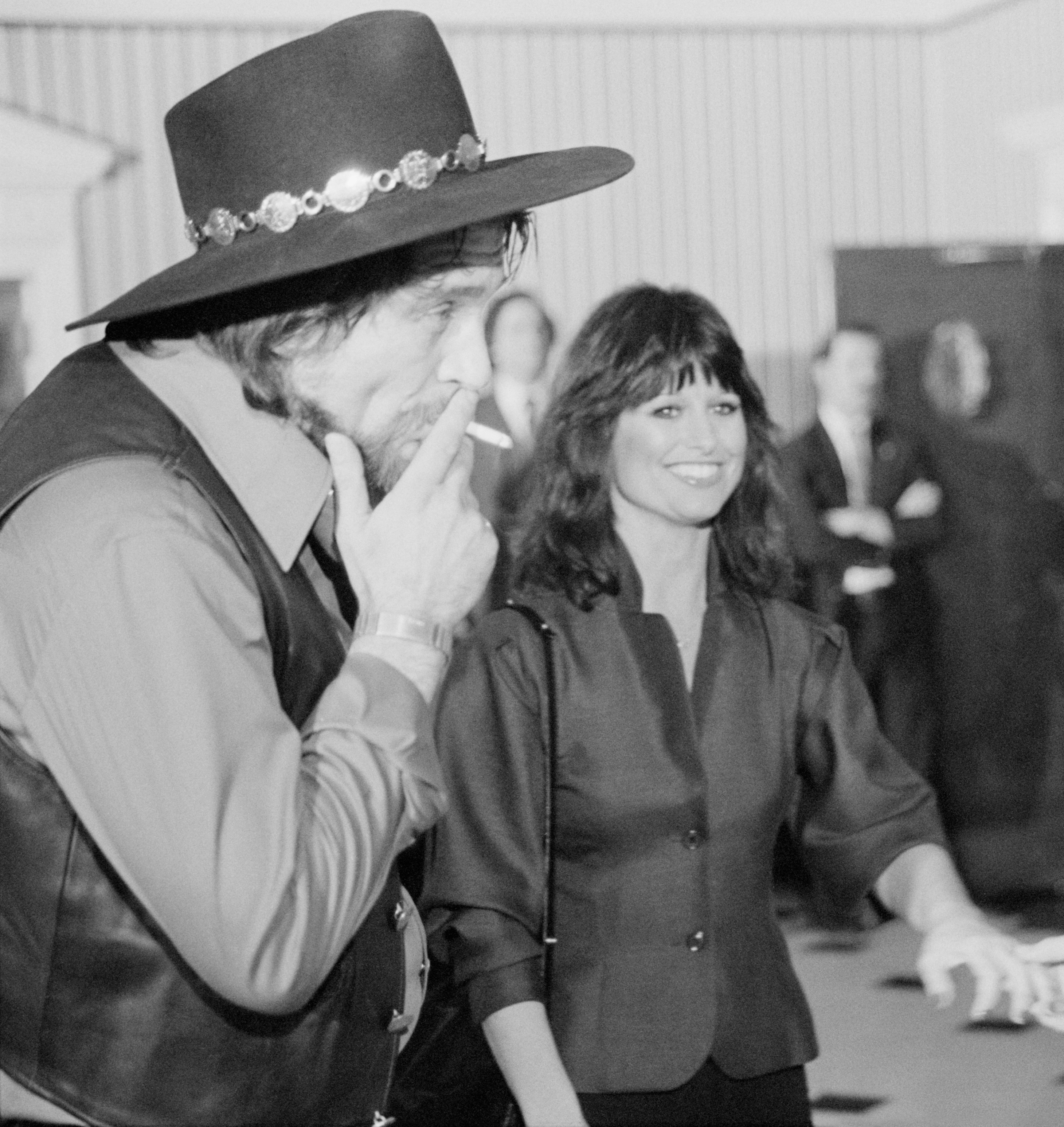
Colter with her second husband, Waylon Jennings, 1980

Colter met guitarist Duane Eddy in Phoenix through her sister Sharon L. Johnson who was married to Cowboy Jack Clement at the time. Eddy produced her first record, and she toured with him. They were married in 1961 in Las Vegas, settling in Los Angeles. She pursued a career as a songwriter under her married name, Mirriam Eddy. Her songs were recorded by Don Gibson, Nancy Sinatra, and Dottie West. Colter and Eddy have a daughter, Jennifer. In 1968, Eddy and Colter separated, divorcing later that year. Colter moved back to Arizona. In that same year, she met Waylon Jennings, and they married on October 27, 1969. At this time, Mirriam adopted her stage name, Jessi Colter. She chose the name based on a story her father once told her about an accomplice of Jesse James's, Jesse Colter. The couple then moved to Nashville, Tennessee, and had one son, Waylon Albright "Shooter" Jennings (b. 1979). Jennings and Colter were married until his death.

Colter announced on June 19, 2023, on her social media pages that she had married Arlin Brower in Rio Verde, Arizona, on February 14, 2023. Colter and Brower were married on a horse-therapy ranch. Arlin Brower is a former heavy equipment contractor and a horse breeder.

== Discography ==
Studio albums

- 1970: A Country Star is Born
- 1975: I'm Jessi Colter
- 1976: Jessi
- 1976: Diamond in the Rough
- 1977: Mirriam
- 1978: That's the Way a Cowboy Rocks and Rolls
- 1981: Ridin' Shotgun
- 1984: Rock and Roll Lullaby
- 1996: Jessi Colter Sings Just for Kids: Songs from Around the World
- 2006: Out of the Ashes
- 2017: The Psalms
- 2023: Edge of Forever

Collaboration albums

- 1976: Wanted! The Outlaws (with Waylon Jennings, Willie Nelson and Tompall Glaser)
- 1981: Leather and Lace (with Waylon Jennings)
- 1978: White Mansions (with Waylon Jennings, John Dillon, Steve Cash and Eric Clapton)

Compilation albums

- 1995: The Jessi Colter Collection
- 2003: The Very Best of Jessi Colter: An Outlaw...a Lady

== Awards and nominations ==
Year	Association	Category	Nominated Work	Result
1970	Grammy Awards	Best Country Performance by a Duo or Group with Vocal	Suspicious Minds (with Waylon Jennings)	Nominated
1975	Academy of Country Music Awards	Song of the Year	I'm Not Lisa	Nominated
1975	Country Music Association Awards	Female Vocalist of the Year	Jessi Colter	Nominated
1975	Country Music Association Awards	Song of the Year	I'm Not Lisa	Nominated
1975	Country Music Association Awards	Single of the Year	I'm Not Lisa	Nominated
1976	Country Music Association Awards	Album of the Year	Wanted! The Outlaws (with Waylon Jennings, Willie Nelson and Tompall Glaser)	Won
1976	Academy of Country Music Awards	Album of the Year	Wanted! The Outlaws (with Waylon Jennings, Willie Nelson and Tompall Glaser)	Nominated
1976	Grammy Awards	Best Female Country Vocal Performance	I'm Not Lisa	Nominated
1976	Grammy Awards	Best Country Song	I'm Not Lisa	Nominated
1981	Country Music Association Awards	Vocal Duo of the Year	Waylon Jennings and Jessi Colter	Nominated
2007	Grammy Awards	Grammy Hall of Fame Award	Wanted! The Outlaws (with Waylon Jennings, Willie Nelson and Tompall Glaser)	Won
