= Waylon Jennings singles discography =

Waylon Jennings discography
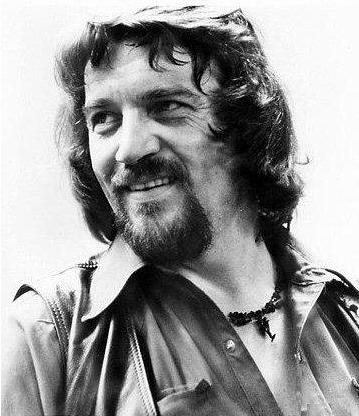
- Jennings in 1976
- Singles: 102
- B-sides: 11
- Music videos: 17
- No. 1 Single (USA): 16
- No. 1 single (All): 32

The following is a complete singles discography of American country music artist Waylon Jennings. A total of 16 Jennings' singles have reached number one on music charts. For the albums, see Waylon Jennings albums discography.

== As lead artist ==
=== 1950s - 1960s ===
Year	Single	Peak positions				Album
Year	Single	US Country	US	CAN Country	CAN	Album
1959	"Jole Blon"	—	—	—	—	Non-album single
1961	"Another Blue Day"	—	—	—	—	Non-album single
1962	"Crying"	—	—	—	—	Waylon at JD's
1963	"My Baby Walks All Over Me"	—	—	—	—	Non-album single
1964	"Love Denied"	—	—	—	—	Non-album single
1964	"Four Strong Winds"	—	—	—	—	Non-album single
1964	"Sing the Girls a Song Bill"	—	—	—	—	Non-album single
1965	"I Don't Believe You"	—	—	—	—	Non-album single
1965	"That's the Chance I'll Have to Take"	49	—	—	—	Folk-Country
1965	"Stop the World (And Let Me Off)"	16	—	—	—	Folk-Country
1965	"Anita, You're Dreaming"	17	—	—	—	Leavin' Town
1966	"Time to Bum Again"	17	—	—	—	Leavin' Town
1966	"(That's What You Get) For Lovin' Me"	9	—	—	—	Leavin' Town
1966	"Green River"	11	—	—	—	Nashville Rebel (soundtrack)
1967	"Mental Revenge"	12	—	—	—	Jewels
1967	"The Chokin' Kind"	8	—	4	—	Hangin' On
1967	"Walk On Out of My Mind"	5	—	5	—	Only the Greatest
1968	"I Got You" (with Anita Carter)	4	—	2	—	Just to Satisfy You
1968	"Only Daddy That'll Walk the Line"	2	—	1	—	Only the Greatest
1968	"Yours Love"	5	—	5	—	Jewels
1968	"My World"	—	—	—	—	Non-album single
1968	"Another Blue Day"	—	—	—	—	Non-album single
1969	"Something's Wrong in California"	19	—	—	—	The Best of Waylon Jennings
1969	"The Days of Sand and Shovels"	20	—	1	—	The Best of Waylon Jennings
1969	"MacArthur Park" (with The Kimberlys)	23	93	11	96	Country-Folk
1969	"Brown Eyed Handsome Man"	3	—	1	—	Waylon
"—" denotes releases that did not chart

=== 1970s ===
Year	Single	Peak positions							Album
Year	Single	US Country	US	US AC	CAN Country	CAN	CAN AC	AU	Album
1970	"Singer of Sad Songs"	12	—	—	11	—	—	—	Singer of Sad Songs
1970	"The Taker"	5	94	—	8	—	—	—	The Taker/Tulsa
1970	"Suspicious Minds" (with Jessi Colter)	25	—	—	—	—	—	—	Non-album single
1970	"(Don't Let the Sun Set on You) Tulsa"	16	—	—	30	—	—	—	The Taker/Tulsa
1971	"Mississippi Woman"	14	—	—	6	—	—	—	The Taker/Tulsa
1971	"Under Your Spell Again" (with Jessi Colter)	39	—	—	—	—	—	—	Ladies Love Outlaws
1971	"Cedartown, Georgia"	12	—	—	11	—	—	—	Cedartown, Georgia
1971	"Good Hearted Woman"	3	—	—	1	—	—	—	Good Hearted Woman
1972	"Sweet Dream Woman"	7	—	—	3	—	—	—	Good Hearted Woman
1972	"Pretend I Never Happened"	6	—	—	2	—	—	—	Lonesome, On'ry and Mean
1973	"You Can Have Her"	7	— (Note: "You Can Have Her" did not enter the Billboard Hot 100, but peaked at number 14 on the Bubbling Under Hot 100 Singles chart.)	—	2	—	—	—	Lonesome, On'ry and Mean
1973	"We Had It All"	28	—	—	17	—	—	—	Honky Tonk Heroes
1973	"You Ask Me To"	8	—	—	8	—	—	—	Honky Tonk Heroes
1974	"This Time"	1	—	—	1	—	—	—	This Time
1974	"I'm a Ramblin' Man"	1	75	—	2	78	—	75	The Ramblin' Man
1975	"Rainy Day Woman"	2	—	—	18	—	—	—	The Ramblin' Man
1975	"Dreaming My Dreams with You"	10	—	—	4	—	—	—	Dreaming My Dreams
1975	"Are You Sure Hank Done It This Way"	1	60	—	21	—	—	—	Dreaming My Dreams
1975	"Good Hearted Woman" (re-recording with Willie Nelson)	1	25	16	5	—	6	—	Wanted! The Outlaws
1976	"Suspicious Minds" (with Jessi Colter; re-release)	2	—	—	2	—	—	—	Wanted! The Outlaws
1976	"Can't You See"	4	97	—	1	—	—	—	Are You Ready for the Country
1976	"Are You Ready for the Country"	7	—	—	3	—	—	—	Are You Ready for the Country
1977	"Luckenbach, Texas (Back to the Basics of Love)"	1	25	16	1	46	40	—	Ol' Waylon
1977	"The Wurlitzer Prize (I Don't Want to Get Over You)"	1	—	—	1	—	—	—	Waylon & Willie
1978	"Mammas Don't Let Your Babies Grow Up to Be Cowboys" (with Willie Nelson)	1	42	33	1	57	42	—	Waylon & Willie
1978	"I've Always Been Crazy"	1	—	—	1	—	—	—	I've Always Been Crazy
1978	"Don't You Think This Outlaw Bit's Done Got Out of Hand"	5	—	—	1	—	—	—	I've Always Been Crazy
1979	"Amanda"	1	54	40	1	67	7	—	Greatest Hits
1979	"Come with Me"	1	—	—	1	—	—	—	What Goes Around Comes Around
1979	"I Ain't Living Long Like This"	1	—	—	1	—	—	—	What Goes Around Comes Around
"—" denotes releases that did not chart

=== 1980s ===
Year	Single	Peak positions				Album
Year	Single	US Country	US	US AC	CAN Country	Album
1980	"Clyde"	7	— (Note: "Clyde" did not enter the Billboard Hot 100, but peaked at number 3 on the Bubbling Under Hot 100 Singles chart.)	—	1	Music Man
1980	"Theme from The Dukes of Hazzard (Good Ol' Boys)" (Note: "Theme from The Dukes of Hazzard (Good Ol' Boys)" reached number 26 on the Official New Zealand Music Chart.)	1	21	—	2	Music Man
1981	"Storms Never Last" (with Jessi Colter)	17	—	—	11	Leather and Lace
1981	"The Wild Side of Life/ It Wasn't God Who Made Honky Tonk Angels" (with Jessi Colter)	10	—	—	6	Leather and Lace
1981	"Shine"	5	—	—	1	Black on Black
1982	"Just to Satisfy You" (with Willie Nelson)	1	52	—	2	Black on Black
1982	"Women Do Know How to Carry On"	4	—	—	6	Black on Black
1982	"(Sittin' On) The Dock of the Bay" (with Willie Nelson)	13	—	—	2	WWII
1983	"Lucille (You Won't Do Your Daddy's Will)"	1	—	—	4	It's Only Rock & Roll
1983	"Breakin' Down"	10	—	—	4	It's Only Rock & Roll
1983	"Hold On, I'm Comin'" (with Jerry Reed)	20	—	—	7	Waylon and Company
1983	"Take It to the Limit" (with Willie Nelson)	8	— (Note: "Take It to the Limit" did not enter the Billboard Hot 100, but peaked at number 2 on the Bubbling Under Hot 100 Singles chart.)	31	1	Take It to the Limit
1983	"The Conversation" (with Hank Williams, Jr.)	15	—	—	12	Waylon and Company
1984	"I May Be Used (But Baby I Ain't Used Up)"	4	—	—	4	Waylon and Company
1984	"Never Could Toe the Mark"	6	—	—	2	Never Could Toe the Mark
1984	"America"	6	—	—	—	Waylon's Greatest Hits, Vol. 2
1985	"Waltz Me to Heaven"	10	—	—	14	Waylon's Greatest Hits, Vol. 2
1985	"Drinkin' and Dreamin'"	2	—	—	26	Turn the Page
1985	"The Devil's on the Loose"	13	—	—	7	Turn the Page
1986	"Sweet Mother Texas"	—	—	—	—	Sweet Mother Texas
1986	"Working Without a Net"	7	—	—	5	Will the Wolf Survive
1986	"Will the Wolf Survive"	5	—	—	5	Will the Wolf Survive
1986	"Even Cowgirls Get the Blues" (with Johnny Cash)	35	—	—	40	Heroes
1986	"What You'll Do When I'm Gone"	8	—	—	7	Will the Wolf Survive
1986	"The Ballad of Forty Dollars" (with Johnny Cash)	—	—	—	50	Heroes
1986	"The Broken Promise Land"	—	—	—	—	The Best of Waylon
1987	"Rose in Paradise"	1	—	—	1	Hangin' Tough
1987	"Fallin' Out"	8	—	—	11	Hangin' Tough
1987	"My Rough and Rowdy Days"	6	—	—	18	A Man Called Hoss
1988	"If Ole Hank Could Only See Us Now"	16	—	—	37	A Man Called Hoss
1988	"How Much Is It Worth to Live in L.A."	38	—	—	42	Full Circle
1989	"Which Way Do I Go (Now That I'm Gone)"	28	—	—	31	Full Circle
1989	"Trouble Man"	61	—	—	—	Full Circle
1989	"You Put the Soul in the Song"	59	—	—	89	Full Circle
"—" denotes releases that did not chart

=== 1990s - 2020s ===
Year	Single	Peak positions		Album
Year	Single	US Country	CAN Country	Album
1990	"Wrong"	5	2	The Eagle
1990	"Where Corn Don't Grow"	67	42	The Eagle
1990	"What Bothers Me Most"	66	72	The Eagle
1991	"The Eagle"	22	20	The Eagle
1991	"If I Can Find a Clean Shirt" (with Willie Nelson)	51	25	Clean Shirt
1991	"Tryin' to Outrun the Wind" (with Willie Nelson)	—	—	Clean Shirt
1992	"Just Talkin'"	—	—	Too Dumb for New York City, Too Ugly for L.A.
1992	"Too Dumb for New York City"	—	83	Too Dumb for New York City, Too Ugly for L.A.
1996	"Deep in the West" (with Jessi Colter)	—	—	Right for the Time
1998	"I Know About Me, I Don't Know About You" (with Travis Tritt)	—	—	Closing in on the Fire
2012	"Goin' Down Rockin'"	—	—	Goin' Down Rockin': The Last Recordings
2025	"Songbird"	—	—	Songbird
2025	"The Cowboy (Small Texas Town)"	—	—	Songbird
2026	"Diamonds"	—	—	Diamonds
2026	"Same Old Blues" (feat. Jessi Colter)	—	—	Diamonds
2026	"Saturday Night Special"	—*	—*	Diamonds
"—" denotes releases that did not chart

== As featured artist ==
Year	Single	Peak positions						Album
Year	Single	US Country	US	US AC	CAN Country	CAN	CAN AC	Album
1967	"Chet's Tune" (as a member of Some of Chet's Friends)	38	—	—	—	—	—	Non-album single
1978	"There Ain't No Good Chain Gang" (Johnny Cash with Waylon Jennings)	2	—	—	5	—	—	I Would Like to See You Again
1983	"Leave Them Boys Alone" (Hank Williams Jr. with Waylon Jennings and Ernest Tubb)	6	—	—	7	—	—	Strong Stuff
1985	"We Are the World" (as a member of USA for Africa)	76	1	1	—	1	1	We Are the World
1987	"The Night Hank Williams Came To Town" (Johnny Cash with Waylon Jennings)	43	—	—	—	—	—	Johnny Cash Is Coming to Town
1988	"Somewhere Between Ragged and Right" (John Anderson with Waylon Jennings)	23	—	—	35	—	—	Blue Skies Again
1988	"Angels Love Bad Men" (Barbara Mandrell with Waylon Jennings)	49	—	—	40	—	—	Sure Feels Good
1988	"High Ridin' Heroes" (David Lynn Jones with Waylon Jennings)	14	—	—	12	—	—	Hard Times on Easy Street
1996	"One Good Love" (Neil Diamond with Waylon Jennings)	—	—	—	34	—	—	Tennessee Moon
2006	"Shakin' the Blues" (Tony Joe White with Waylon Jennings)	—	—	—	—	—	—	Uncovered
2025	"Mamas Don't Let Your Cowboys (Grow Up to be Babies)" (Tony Joe White with Waylon Jennings)	—	—	—	—	—	—	The Real Thang
"—" denotes releases that did not chart

== Charted B-sides ==
Year	Title	Peak positions			A-side single
Year	Title	US Country	US	CAN Country	A-side single
1967	"Love of the Common People"	67	—	—	"The Chokin' Kind"
1969	"Delia's Gone"	37	— (Note: "Delia's Gone" did not enter the Billboard Hot 100, but peaked at number 24 on the Bubbling Under Hot 100 Singles chart.)	—	"The Days of Sand and Shovels"
1975	"Let's All Help the Cowboy (Sing the Blues)"	flip	—	—	"Rainy Day Woman"
1975	"Waymore's Blues"	—	— (Note: "Waymore's Blues" did not enter the Billboard Hot 100, but peaked at number 10 on the Bubbling Under Hot 100 Singles chart.)	—	"Dreaming My Dreams with You"
1975	"Bob Wills Is Still the King"	flip	—	—	"Are You Sure Hank Done It This Way"
1976	"I'll Go Back to Her"	flip	—	—	"Can't You See"
1976	"So Good Woman"	flip	—	—	"Are You Ready for the Country"
1977	"Lookin' for a Feeling"	flip	—	—	"The Wurlitzer Prize (I Don't Want to Get Over You)"
1978	"I Can Get Off On You" (with Willie Nelson)	flip	—	—	"Mamas Don't Let Your Babies Grow Up to Be Cowboys"
1978	"Girl I Can Tell (You're Trying to Work It Out)"	flip	—	—	"Don't You Think This Outlaw Bit's Done Got Out of Hand"
1979	"I Wish I Was Crazy Again" (Johnny Cash with Waylon Jennings)	22	—	25	"There Ain't No Good Chain Gang"
"—" denotes releases that did not chart

== Music videos ==
Year	Title	Director
1983	"The Conversation" (with Hank Williams, Jr.)	David Hogan
1984	"Never Could Toe the Mark"	David Hogan
1984	"If She'll Leave Her Mama"	David Hogan
1984	"Settin' Me Up"	David Hogan
1984	"Where Would I Be (Without You)"	David Hogan
1984	"Whatever Gets You Through the Night"	David Hogan
1984	"America"	David Hogan
1990	"Wrong"	Deaton Flanigen
1991	"If I Can Find a Clean Shirt" (with Willie Nelson)	Deaton Flanigen
1993	"Cowboy Movies"	Greg Travis
1995	"Wild Ones"	Deaton Flanigen
1996	"One Good Love" (with Neil Diamond)	Deaton Flanigen
1996	"Deep in the West" (with Jessi Colter)	Jane Minarovic
2001	"Drift Away"	Wyatt Smith
2001	"Never Say Die"	Wyatt Smith
2001	"Amanda/A Couple More Years"	Wyatt Smith
2025	"Songbird"	Greg Olliver
2025	"The Cowboy (Small Texas Town)"	
2026	"Diamonds"	Will Acuña
2026	"Same Old Blues" (with Jessi Colter)	Will Acuña

== See also ==
- The Highwaymen, for a discography of the supergroup consisting of Johnny Cash, Jennings, Kris Kristofferson, and Willie Nelson.
- Old Dogs, for a discography of the supergroup consisting of Bobby Bare, Jennings, Jerry Reed, and Mel Tillis.
