= Waylon Jennings albums discography =

Cataloging of published albums by Waylon Jennings

Waylon Jennings discography
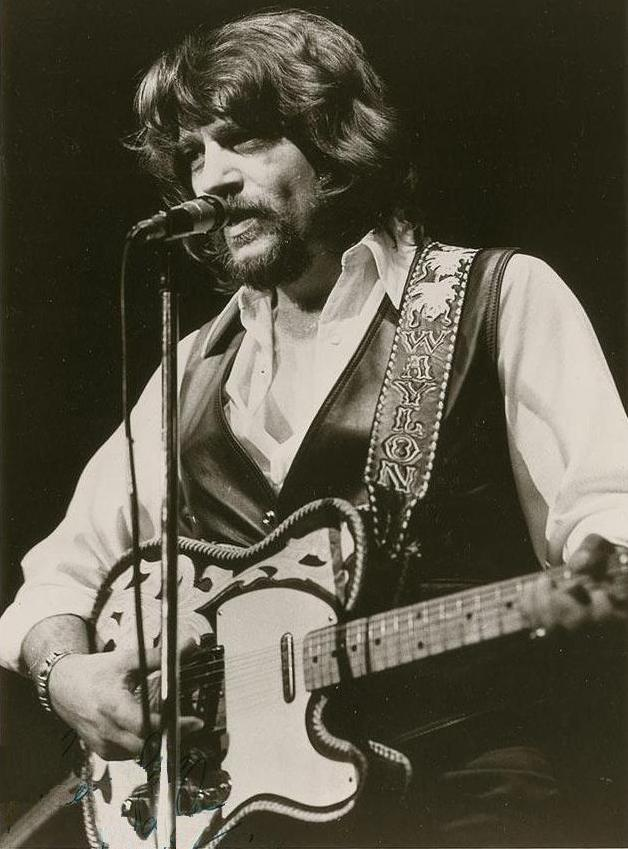
- Jennings in 1973
- Studio albums: 47
- Soundtrack albums: 5
- Live albums: 11
- Compilation albums: 33
- Collaborations: 13

The following is a complete albums discography of American country music artist Waylon Jennings. For the singles, see Waylon Jennings singles discography. For a discography as a member of The Highwaymen, see The Highwaymen discography.

== Studio albums ==
=== 1960s ===
Title	Details	Peak positions
Title	Details	US Country
Waylon at JD's	Release date: 1964; Label: Sounds LTD	—
Folk-Country	Release date: 1966; Label: RCA Victor	9
Leavin' Town	Release date: 1966; Label: RCA Victor	3
Waylon Sings Ol' Harlan	Release date: 1967; Label: RCA Victor	32
Love of the Common People	Release date: 1967; Label: RCA Victor	3
The One and Only	Release date: 1967; Label: RCA Camden	19
Hangin' On	Release date: 1968; Label: RCA Victor	9
Only the Greatest	Release date: 1968; Label: RCA Victor	12
Jewels	Release date: 1968; Label: RCA Victor	6
Just to Satisfy You	Release date: 1969; Label: RCA Victor	7
"—" denotes releases that did not chart

=== 1970s ===
Title	Details	Peak chart positions				Certifications (sales thresholds)
Title	Details	US Country	US	CAN Country	CAN	Certifications (sales thresholds)
Waylon	Release date: 1970; Label: RCA Victor	14	192	—	—	
Singer of Sad Songs	Release date: 1970; Label: RCA Records	23	—	—	—	
The Taker/Tulsa	Release date: 1971; Label: RCA Records	12	—	—	—	
Cedartown, Georgia	Release date: 1971; Label: RCA Records	27	—	—	—	
Good Hearted Woman	Release date: 1972; Label: RCA Records	7	—	—	—	
Ladies Love Outlaws	Release date: 1972; Label: RCA Records	11	—	—	—	
Lonesome, On'ry and Mean	Release date: 1973; Label: RCA Victor	8	214	—	—	
Honky Tonk Heroes	Release date: 1973; Label: RCA Victor	14	185	—	—	
This Time	Release date: 1974; Label: RCA Victor	4	—	—	—	
The Ramblin' Man	Release date: 1974; Label: RCA Victor	3	105	—	—	
Dreaming My Dreams	Release date: 1975; Label: RCA Victor	1	49	—	—	US: Gold
Are You Ready for the Country	Release date: 1976; Label: RCA Victor	1	34	—	—	US: Gold
Ol' Waylon	Release date: 1977; Label: RCA Victor	1	15	—	65	US: Platinum; CAN: Gold
I've Always Been Crazy	Release date: 1978; Label: RCA Victor	1	48	1	71	US: Gold
What Goes Around Comes Around	Release date: 1979; Label: RCA Victor	2	49	3	58	US: Gold
"—" denotes releases that did not chart

=== 1980s ===
Title	Details	Peak chart positions				Certifications (sales thresholds)
Title	Details	US Country	US	CAN Country	CAN	Certifications (sales thresholds)
Music Man	Release date: 1980; Label: RCA Victor	1	36	1	46	US: Gold
Black on Black	Release date: 1982; Label: RCA Victor	3	39	—	—	
It's Only Rock + Roll	Release date: 1983; Label: RCA Victor	10	109	—	—	
Waylon and Company	Release date: 1983; Label: RCA Victor	12	—	—	—	
Never Could Toe the Mark	Release date: 1984; Label: RCA Victor	20	208	—	—	
Turn the Page	Release date: 1985; Label: RCA Victor	23	—	—	—	
Sweet Mother Texas	Release date: 1986; Label: RCA Victor	—	—	—	—	
Will the Wolf Survive	Release date: 1986; Label: MCA Records	1	—	—	—	
Hangin' Tough	Release date: 1987; Label: MCA Records	19	—	—	—	
A Man Called Hoss	Release date: 1987; Label: MCA Records	22	—	—	—	
Full Circle	Release date: 1988; Label: MCA Records	37	—	—	—	
"—" denotes releases that did not chart

=== 1990s ===
Title	Details	Peak chart positions	
Title	Details	US Country	US
The Eagle	Release date: 1990; Label: Epic Records	9	172
Too Dumb for New York City, Too Ugly for L.A.	Release date: 1992; Label: Epic Records	70	—
Ol' Waylon Sings Ol' Hank	Release date: 1992; Label: WJ Records	—	—
Cowboys, Sisters, Rascals & Dirt	Release date: 1993; Label: Ode 2 Kids / BMG	—	—
Waymore's Blues (Part II)	Release date: 1994; Label: RCA Records	63	—
Right for the Time	Release date: 1996; Label: Justice Records	—	—
Closing In on the Fire	Release date: 1998; Label: Ark 21 Records	71	—
"—" denotes releases that did not chart

=== 2000s - 2020s ===
Title	Details	Peak chart positions	
Title	Details	US	US Country
Waylon Forever (with Shooter Jennings and the .357's)	Release date: 2008; Label: Vagrant Records	142	28
Goin' Down Rockin': The Last Recordings	Release date: 2012; Label: Saguaro Road	67	14
Songbird	Release date: October 3, 2025; Label: Son of Jessi, Thirty Tigers	116	17
Diamonds	Release date: November 13, 2026; Label: Son of Jessi, Thirty Tigers	—*	—*

== Live albums ==
Title	Details	Peak chart positions		Certifications (sales thresholds)	Source
Title	Details	US Country	US	Certifications (sales thresholds)	Source
Waylon Live	Release date: December 1976; Label: RCA Victor	1	46	US: Gold	
The Restless Kid: Live at JD's	Release date: April 25, 2000; Label: Bear Family Records	—	—		
Never Say Die: Live	Release date: October 10, 2000; Label: Columbia Records	71	—		
Live from Austin, TX '89	Release date: February 21, 2006; Label: New West Records	—	—		
Never Say Die: The Final Concert	Release date: July 24, 2007; Label: Legacy Recordings	67	—		
Live from Austin, TX '84	Release date: October 28, 2008; Label: New West Records	—	—		
Setlist: The Very Best Of Waylon Jennings Live	Release date: July 12, 2011; Label: Legacy Recordings	—	—		
Live At the US Festival, 1983	Release date: November 15, 2011; Label: Shout! Factory	—	—		
Live In Concert (Myrtle Beach, South Carolina 1995)	Release date: 2015; Label: Black Country Rock Media, Cracker Barrel Music	—	—		
Live at the Grand Ole Opry, Nashville, TN, August 12, 1978	Release date: June 17, 2015; Label: Hotspur	—	—		
Live In Concert Vol. 2 (Omaha, Nebraska 1979)	Release date: November 27, 2015; Label: Black Country Rock Media	—	—		
"—" denotes releases that did not chart

== Compilations ==
Title	Details	Peak chart positions					Certifications (sales thresholds)
Title	Details	US Country	US	AUS	CAN Country	CAN	Certifications (sales thresholds)
Waylon Jennings	Release date: 1969; Label: Vocalion Records	—	—	—	—	—	
The Best of Waylon Jennings	Release date: 1970; Label: RCA Records	—	—	—	—	—	
Don't Think Twice	Release date: 1970; Label: A&M Records	—	—	—	—	—	
Heartaches by the Number	Release date: 1972; Label: RCA Camden	—	—	—	—	—	
Ruby, Don't Take Your Love to Town	Release date: 1973; Label: RCA Camden	—	—	—	—	—	
Only Daddy That'll Walk the Line	Release date: 1974; Label: RCA Camden	—	—	—	—	—	
Greatest Hits	Release date: 1979; Label: RCA Records	1	28	75	1	20	US: 5× Platinum; CAN: 3× Platinum
Waylon's Greatest Hits, Vol. 2	Release date: 1984; Label: RCA Victor	27	202	—	—	—	
The Collector's Series	Release date: 1985; Label: RCA Victor	—	—	—	—	—	
The Waylon Files, Vol. 1–15	Release date: 1985; Label: Bear Family Records	—	—	—	—	—	
The Best of Waylon	Release date: 1986; Label: RCA Records	—	—	—	—	—	
The Early Years	Release date: 1989; Label: RCA Records	—	—	—	—	—	
New Classic Waylon	Release date: 1989; Label: MCA Records	48	—	—	—	—	
Waylon Jennings – The RCA Years – Only Daddy That'll Walk the Line	Release date: 1993; Label: RCA Records	—	—	—	—	—	
The Essential Waylon Jennings	Release date: 1996; Label: RCA Records	—	—	—	—	—	
Super Hits	Release date: 1996; Label: RCA Records	66	—	—	—	—	
Super Hits II	Release date: 1998; Label: RCA Records	—	—	—	—	—	
20th Century Masters – The Millennium Collection: The Best of Waylon Jennings	Release date: 2000; Label: MCA Nashville	67	—	—	—	—	
RCA Country Legends	Release date: 2001; Label: RCA Records	19	155	—	—	—	
Ultimate Waylon Jennings	Release date: 2004; Label: RCA Records	16	139	—	—	—	
The Complete MCA Recordings	Release date: 2006; Label: MCA Nashville	—	—	—	—	—	
16 Biggest Hits	Release date: 2005; Label: Legacy Recordings	42	—	—	—	—	
Nashville Rebel	Release date: 2006; Label: RCA Records	—	—	—	—	—	
Waylon Sings Hank Williams	Release date: 2006; Label: YMC Records	—	—	—	—	—	
Covered By Waylon	Release date: 2006; Label: Label: Sony BMG Music Entertainment (Sterling Entertainment Group)	—	—	—	—	—	
The Essential Waylon Jennings	Release date: 2007; Label: Legacy Recordings	—	—	—	—	—	
Playlist: The Very Best of Waylon Jennings	Release date: 2008; Label: Legacy Recordings	53	—	—	—	—	
Super Hits II	Release date: 2010; Label: Sony Music	74	—	—	—	—	
Country: Waylon Jennings	Release date: 2012; Label: Sony Music	62	—	—	—	—	
Live 55	Release date: April 18, 2015; Label: Black Country Rock Media	—	—	—	—	—	
The Lost Nashville Sessions	Release date: September 2, 2016; Label: Country Rewind Records	—	—	—	—	—	
New Stuff	Release date: November 24, 2017; Label: Black Country Rock Media	—	—	—	—	—	
When the Balladeer Met the Dukes	Release date: April 18, 2026; Label: Son of Jessi	—	—	—	—	—	
"—" denotes releases that did not chart

== Collaborations ==
=== With Willie Nelson ===
Title	Details	Peak chart positions					Certifications (sales thresholds)
Title	Details	US Country	US	AUS	CAN Country	CAN	Certifications (sales thresholds)
Waylon & Willie	Release date: 1978; Label: RCA Victor	1	12	—	7	11	US: 2× Platinum; CAN: Platinum
WWII	Release date: 1982; Label: RCA Victor	3	57	92	—	—	US: Gold
Take It to the Limit	Release date: 1983; Label: Columbia Records	3	60	—	—	—	US: Gold
Clean Shirt	Release date: 1991; Label: Epic Records	28	193	—	—	—	
Waylon and Willie Super Hits	Release date: 1999; Label: RCA Records	—	—	—	—	—	
"—" denotes releases that did not chart

=== Other collaborations ===
Title	Details	Peak chart positions			Certifications (sales thresholds)
Title	Details	US Country	US	CAN	Certifications (sales thresholds)
Country-Folk (with the Kimberlys)	Release date: 1969; Label: RCA Victor	13	169	—	
Wanted! The Outlaws (with Willie Nelson, Jessi Colter and Tompall Glaser)	Release date: 1976; Label: RCA Victor	1	10	59	US: 2× Platinum; CAN: Platinum
White Mansions (with Jessi Colter, John Dillon and Steve Cash)	Release date: 1978; Label: A&M Records	—	—	—	
Leather and Lace (with Jessi Colter)	Release date: 1982; Label: RCA Victor	11	43	—	US: Gold
Heroes (with Johnny Cash)	Release date: 1986; Label: Columbia Records	13	—	—	
Old Dogs (with Bobby Bare, Jerry Reed, Mel Tillis)	Release date: 1998; Label: Atlantic Records	61	—	—	
The Crickets and Their Buddies (with the Crickets and various artists)	Release date: 2004; Label: Sovereign Artists	—	—	—	
Old 97's & Waylon Jennings (with Old 97's)	Release date: 2013; Label: Omnivore Recordings	65	—	—	
"—" denotes releases that did not chart

== Soundtrack albums ==
Title	Details	Peak chart positions			Certifications (sales thresholds)
Title	Details	US Country	US	CAN	Certifications (sales thresholds)
Nashville Rebel	Release date: 1966; Label: RCA Victor	4	—	—	
Ned Kelly	Release date: 1970; Label: United Artists Records	—	—	—	
Mackintosh & T.J.	Release date: 1976; Label: RCA Victor	16	189	—	
The Pursuit of D. B. Cooper	Release date: 1981; Label: Polydor Records	—	—	—	
Sesame Street Presents: Follow That Bird	Release date: 1981; Label: RCA Victor	—	—	—	
"—" denotes releases that did not chart
