= List of Top Country LP's number ones of 1977 =

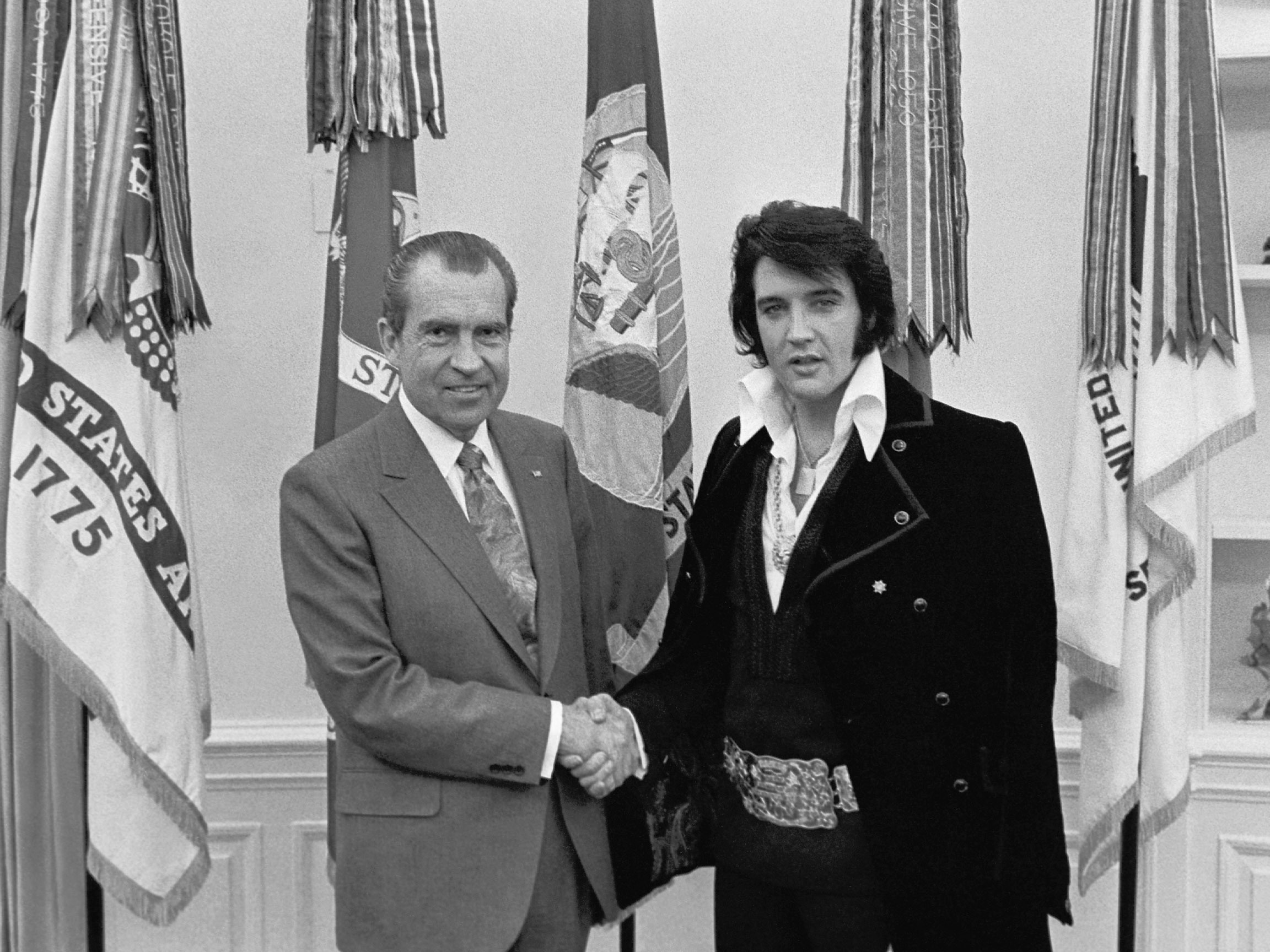
Elvis Presley (right, pictured with US president Richard Nixon in 1970) spent 15 consecutive weeks at number one, beginning shortly after his death in August 1977.

Top Country Albums is a chart that ranks the top-performing country music albums in the United States, published by Billboard. In 1977, 12 different albums topped the chart, which was at the time published under the title Top Country LP's, based on sales reports submitted by a representative sample of stores nationwide.

In the issue of Billboard dated January 1, Waylon Jennings was at number one with his album Are You Ready for the Country, its tenth week in the top spot. The following week it was displaced by Conway Twitty's album Conway Twitty's Greatest Hits Vol. II, but one week later Jennings was back at number one with Waylon Live, an album of live performances recorded in 1974, which spent six weeks atop the chart. In June Jennings topped the chart once again with Ol' Waylon, which featured his most successful single, "Luckenbach, Texas (Back to the Basics of Love)". Having entered the country albums chart regularly for nearly ten years without ever reaching number one, Jennings had now achieved four chart-topping albums in less than two years. Ol' Waylon spent 13 consecutive weeks in the top spot, the longest unbroken run at number one since 1972, and meant that Jennings had the highest total number of weeks at number one during the year.

Two artists other than Jennings achieved more than one chart-topper during the year. Dolly Parton spent a single week at number one in May with New Harvest...First Gathering, and returned to the top spot in December with Here You Come Again, which was the year's final number one. The other artist with multiple chart-topping albums was Elvis Presley, who died on August 16. In the issue of Billboard dated September 3, Moody Blue, the last album released in his lifetime, reached the top spot on the Top Country LP's chart and began a run of 10 consecutive weeks atop the listing. When it was displaced from the top spot in the issue dated November 12, it was by another of Presley's recordings, Elvis in Concert, the soundtrack to a television special recorded in June 1977 and broadcast two months after his death. The album reached number one in only its third week on the country chart, and spent five weeks at number one, giving Presley an unbroken run of 15 weeks in the top spot. The singer, known as the "King of Rock and Roll", would make many more posthumous appearances in the country albums chart, but his next number one would not come until 2002. In May Kenny Rogers topped the chart for the first time with his eponymous second solo album. Over the next decade, Rogers would go on to experience huge success not only in country music but also in the pop music field, with number ones in both markets. He is regarded as one of the most successful country singers of his generation.

== Chart history ==
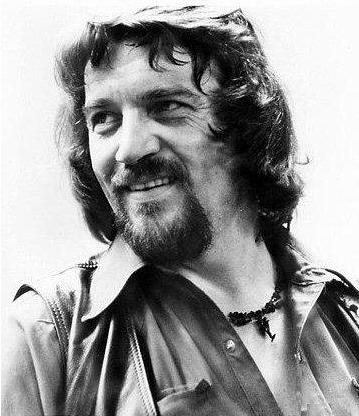
Waylon Jennings spent the most weeks at number one in 1977.

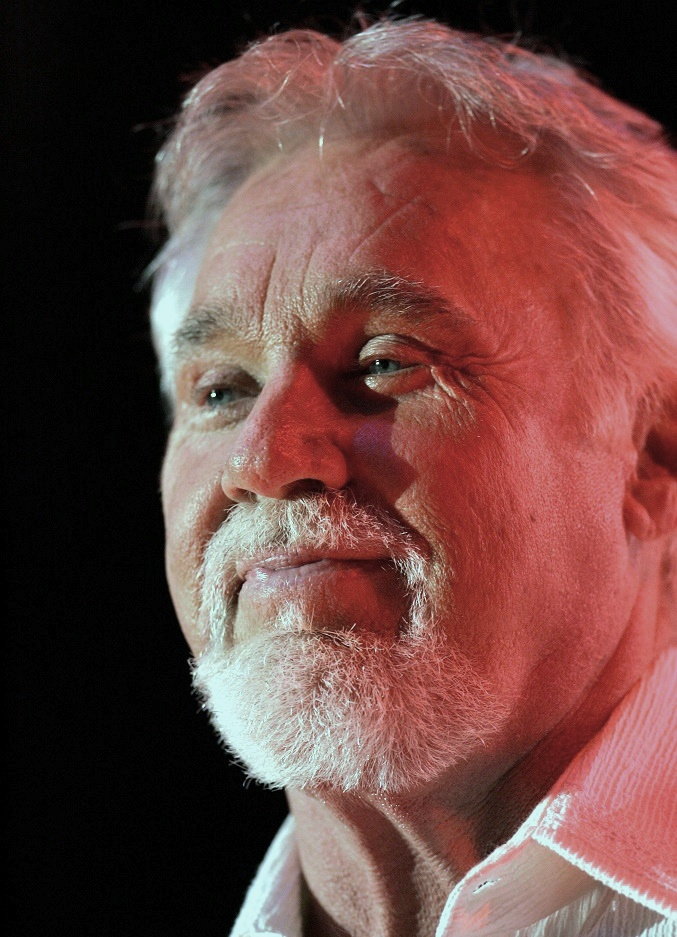
Kenny Rogers topped the chart for the first time with his eponymous second solo album.

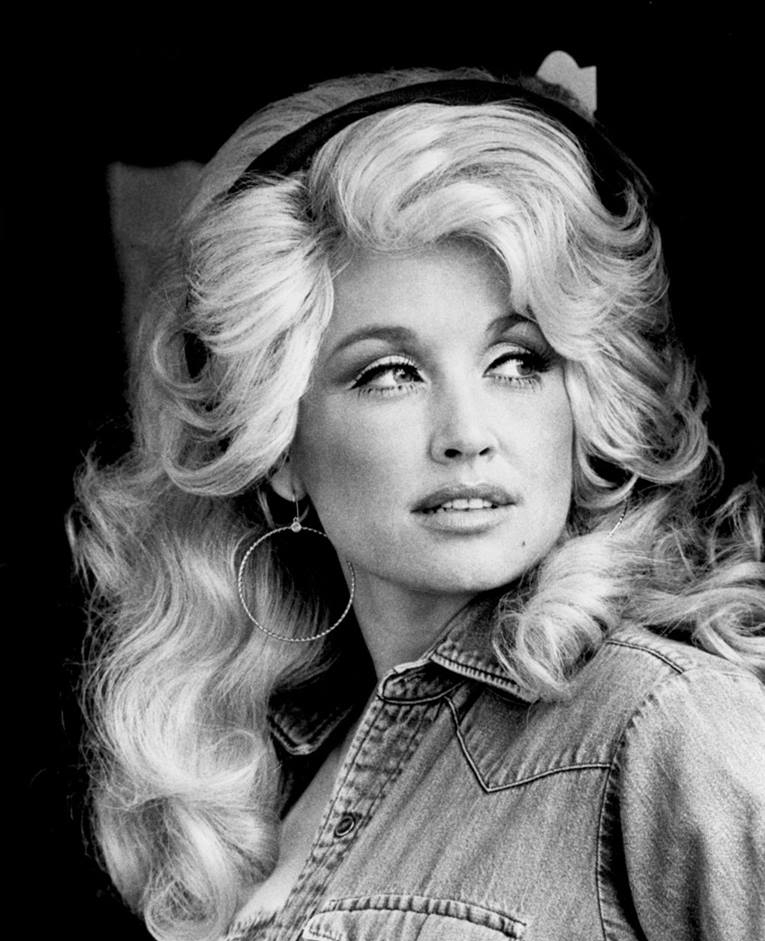
Dolly Parton had two number ones and ended the year in the top spot.

Issue date	Title	Artist(s)	Ref.
January 1	Are You Ready for the Country	Waylon Jennings	
January 8	Conway Twitty's Greatest Hits Vol. II	Conway Twitty	
January 15	Waylon Live	Waylon Jennings	
January 22	Waylon Live	Waylon Jennings	
January 29	Waylon Live	Waylon Jennings	
February 5	Waylon Live	Waylon Jennings	
February 12	Waylon Live	Waylon Jennings	
February 19	Waylon Live	Waylon Jennings	
February 26	Luxury Liner	Emmylou Harris	
March 5	Luxury Liner	Emmylou Harris	
March 12	Luxury Liner	Emmylou Harris	
March 19	Luxury Liner	Emmylou Harris	
March 26	Luxury Liner	Emmylou Harris	
April 2	Luxury Liner	Emmylou Harris	
April 9	Luxury Liner	Emmylou Harris	
April 16	Luxury Liner	Emmylou Harris	
April 23	Southern Nights	Glen Campbell	
April 30	Southern Nights	Glen Campbell	
May 7	Southern Nights	Glen Campbell	
May 14	New Harvest...First Gathering	Dolly Parton	
May 21	Kenny Rogers	Kenny Rogers	
May 28	Kenny Rogers	Kenny Rogers	
June 4	Ol' Waylon	Waylon Jennings	
June 11	Ol' Waylon	Waylon Jennings	
June 18	Ol' Waylon	Waylon Jennings	
June 25	Ol' Waylon	Waylon Jennings	
July 2	Ol' Waylon	Waylon Jennings	
July 9	Ol' Waylon	Waylon Jennings	
July 16	Ol' Waylon	Waylon Jennings	
July 23	Ol' Waylon	Waylon Jennings	
July 30	Ol' Waylon	Waylon Jennings	
August 6	Ol' Waylon	Waylon Jennings	
August 13	Ol' Waylon	Waylon Jennings	
August 20	Ol' Waylon	Waylon Jennings	
August 27	Ol' Waylon	Waylon Jennings	
September 3	Moody Blue	Elvis Presley	
September 10	Moody Blue	Elvis Presley	
September 17	Moody Blue	Elvis Presley	
September 24	Moody Blue	Elvis Presley	
October 1	Moody Blue	Elvis Presley	
October 8	Moody Blue	Elvis Presley	
October 15	Moody Blue	Elvis Presley	
October 22	Moody Blue	Elvis Presley	
October 29	Moody Blue	Elvis Presley	
November 5	Moody Blue	Elvis Presley	
November 12	Elvis in Concert	Elvis Presley	
November 19	Elvis in Concert	Elvis Presley	
November 26	Elvis in Concert	Elvis Presley	
December 3	Elvis in Concert	Elvis Presley	
December 10	Elvis in Concert	Elvis Presley	
December 17	Simple Dreams	Linda Ronstadt	
December 24	Here You Come Again	Dolly Parton	
December 31	Here You Come Again	Dolly Parton	
