= 16 Biggest Hits (Waylon Jennings album) =

Greatest hits album by Waylon Jennings
- Released: March 22, 2005
- Genre: Country
- Label: Legacy

Waylon Jennings chronology
The Complete MCA Recordings (2004)	16 Biggest Hits (2005)	Live from Austin, TX (2006)

Professional ratings
Review scores
Source	Rating
AllMusic	3.5/5 stars

16 Biggest Hits is the twenty-second compilation album. It is part of a series of similar 16 Biggest Hits albums released by Legacy Recordings in 2005. It has sold 747,000 copies in the US as of May 2013.

== Track listing ==
No.	Title	Writer(s)	Length
1.	"This Time"	Waylon Jennings	2:26
2.	"I'm a Ramblin' Man"	Ray Pennington	2:48
3.	"Rainy Day Woman"	Jennings	2:31
4.	"Are You Sure Hank Done It This Way"	Jennings	2:55
5.	"Good Hearted Woman" (Duet with Willie Nelson)	Jennings, Willie Nelson	2:59
6.	"Luckenbach, Texas (Back to the Basics of Love)"	Bobby Emmons, Chips Moman	3:20
7.	"The Wurlitzer Prize (I Don't Want to Get Over You)"	Emmons, Moman	2:09
8.	"Mammas Don't Let Your Babies Grow Up to Be Cowboys" (Duet with Willie Nelson)	Ed Bruce, Patsy Bruce	2:33
9.	"I've Always Been Crazy"	Jennings	4:15
10.	"Amanda"	Bob McDill	2:59
11.	"Come with Me"	Chuck Howard	3:02
12.	"I Ain't Living Long Like This"	Rodney Crowell	4:47
13.	"Theme from The Dukes of Hazzard (Good Ol' Boys)"	Jennings	2:08
14.	"Just to Satisfy You" (Duet with Willie Nelson)	Don Bowman, Jennings	2:50
15.	"Lucille (You Won't Do Your Daddy's Will)"	Al Collins, Little Richard	3:27
16.	"Drinkin' and Dreamin'"	Naomi Martin, Jimmy Payne	3:00

== Charts ==
=== Weekly charts ===
Chart (2005–06)	Peak position
US Top Country Albums (Billboard)	42

=== Year-end charts ===
Chart (2006)	Position
US Top Country Albums (Billboard)	75
