= Live from Austin, TX (Waylon Jennings album) =

Live album by Waylon Jennings
- Released: February 21, 2006
- Recorded: April 1, 1989
- Genres: Country; Outlaw country
- Label: New West
- Producers: Gary Briggs, Cameron Strang

Waylon Jennings chronology
16 Biggest Hits (2005)	Live from Austin, TX (2006)	Nashville Rebel (2006)

Waylon Jennings live album chronology
Never Say Die: Live (2000)	Live from Austin, TX '89 (2006)	Never Say Die: The Final Concert (2007)

Professional ratings
Review scores
Source	Rating
AllMusic	3.5/5 stars

Live from Austin, TX is the fourth live album by Waylon Jennings, released on New West Records in 2006. As part of New West's series of albums featuring individual artists' performances on Austin City Limits, it was recorded on April 1, 1989.

The songs featured themselves primarily include popular selections from Jennings' own catalog: "I'm a Ramblin' Man", "America", "Theme from The Dukes of Hazzard (Good Ol' Boys)", "Luckenbach, Texas (Back to the Basics of Love)" and "Mamas Don't Let Your Babies Grow Up to Be Cowboys", among others. The concert was also released in video format and in 2007, the DVD of Live from Austin, TX was certified gold by the RIAA.

== Track listing ==
1. "I'm a Ramblin' Man" (Ray Pennington)
2. "Rainy Day Woman" (Jennings)
3. "America" (Sammy Johns)
4. "I May Be Used (But Baby I Ain't Used Up)" (Bob McDill)
5. "Amanda" (McDill)
6. "Me and Bobby McGee" (Kris Kristofferson)
7. "Trouble Man" (Jennings, Tony Joe White)
8. "Mammas Don't Let Your Babies Grow Up to Be Cowboys" (Ed Bruce, Patsy Bruce)
9. "Good Ol' Boys" (Jennings)
10. "Bob Wills Is Still the King" (Jennings)
11. "Are You Sure Hank Done It This Way" (Jennings)
12. "Suspicious Minds" (Mark James)
13. "Honky Tonk Angels" (Edward Miller, Patsy Miller)
14. "Good Hearted Woman" (Jennings, Willie Nelson)
15. "I've Always Been Crazy" (Jennings)
16. "Luckenbach, Texas (Back to the Basics of Love)" (Bobby Emmons, Chips Moman)
17. "I Ain't Living Long Like This" (Rodney Crowell)
