= Waylon Live =

Live album by Waylon Jennings
- Released: December 1976
- Recorded: September 25-27, 1974
- Venues: The Western Place, (Dallas, TX, September 25, 1974); The Austin Opry House (Austin, TX, September 26-27, 1974)
- Genres: Country; outlaw country
- Length: Original release: 39:36; 1999 reissue: 1:09:19; 2003 reissue: 2:07:22
- Label: RCA Victor
- Producers: Waylon Jennings; Ray Pennington

Waylon Jennings chronology
Are You Ready for the Country (1976)	Waylon Live (1976)	Ol' Waylon (1977)

Waylon Jennings live album chronology
Waylon Live (1976)	The Restless Kid: Live at JD's (2000)

Alternative cover
- 2003 Expanded Edition cover

Waylon Live is the first live album by Waylon Jennings, released on RCA Victor in 1976.

== Background ==
Jennings first gained fame as a live performer at a club called J.D.s in Phoenix, Arizona in the early 1960s. A protégé of Buddy Holly (with whom he toured before the rock and roll pioneer's death in 1959), Jennings and his band the Waylors played many styles of music, including folk, rock, and country, and it was on the basis of his local fame throughout Arizona that he was signed to RCA Victor in 1966 by Chet Atkins. However, the Texan quickly became disillusioned with the lackluster sound of his recordings, especially when compared to his live shows. He began demanding the right to record with the Waylors and produce his own records, and by 1972 RCA - regretting the loss of Willie Nelson to Atlantic and under siege from Waylon's new manager Neil Reshen - gave in. What followed was an unprecedented string of critically acclaimed albums, including the groundbreaking Honky Tonk Heroes in 1973, widely regarded as ground zero for the outlaw country movement. Reshen also booked Jennings and his band into clubs not known for country music, like Max's Kansas City in New York City. In the CMT episode of Inside Fame about his life, Jennings recalled that he told the jaded rock audience at Max's Kansas City on January 17, 1973 that he was from Nashville and would be playing country music, adding "We sure hope you like it, but if you don't like it you better keep your mouth shut, 'cause we will kick your ass." When met with the audience's reply of "Who the hell are you?", Jennings replied: "I'm Waylon goddamn Jennings."

== Recording ==
In late September 1974, as his single "I'm a Ramblin' Man" was riding high on the country singles charts, Jennings and producer Ray Pennington recorded three shows with the Waylors: one at Dallas' Western Place and two more at Austin's Texas Opry House on back to back nights, across three consecutive nights. The original LP assembled from these shows is one of Jennings' most highly praised releases and includes some of his most popular songs, including "Rainy Day Women," "This Time," and "Good Hearted Woman." The latter track had been included on Wanted! The Outlaws with an overdubbed vocal by Willie Nelson and released as a single, hitting #1 on the Billboard country singles chart and peaking at #25 on the pop chart. The album also contained songs not found on his previous records, such as the Jimmie Rodgers song "T For Texas," a cover of Nelson's "Me and Paul," and Rex Griffin's anguished 1930's lament "The Last Letter." The album is best known for "Bob Wills Is Still the King", which had appeared as the B-side to his 1975 #1 hit "Are You Sure Hank Done It This Way." The Wills tribute, which Jennings introduces as "a song I wrote on a plane between Dallas and Austin," took aim at country trends, including the outlaw country movement that he and friend Willie Nelson had done so much to create. As author Michael Striessguth observes, "It was another delightful example of Waylon's eagerness to poke fun at the highfalutin music industry, in this case, Willie Nelson and the redneck rock thing down in Texas. It don't matter who's in Austin/Bob Wills is still the king."

According to Rich Kienzle's liner notes for the 2003 expanded edition, Jennings had originally planned on releasing a double album, but the idea was dropped simply because double albums were not considered viable in country music, although they were very popular in rock music. In 1999, a revised CD version restored the nine extra tracks like Jennings had wanted, including the outlaw anthem "Lonesome, On'ry and Mean," the Kris Kristofferson songs "The Taker" and "Loving Her Was Easier than Anything I'll Ever Do Again," and the Willie Nelson-composed "Pick Up the Tempo." In 2003, an expanded deluxe version was released that contained 42 tracks taken from the three shows, making it the definitive document of Jennings live sound in this mid-seventies prime. Jennings is backed by his band the Waylors, including drummer Richie Albright and the legendary steel guitarist Ralph Mooney. Mooney, who had previously played with Bakersfield singers Wynn Stewart, Buck Owens, and Merle Haggard and had co-written the country standard "Crazy Arms," is in especially fine form on the recordings, with Jennings calling out "Pick it, Moon!" on several instrumental breaks. In his essay for the 2003 expanded edition of the album, Rich Kienzle notes:

"Moon was the unifier within the Waylors. His sharp toned, economical style gave the band's disparate musical elements cohesion. He played exactly what the song needed - no more, no less. His playing made a greater point: Waylon's sound might have roared more than some purists and old timers might have liked (in that era, a few reactionaries actually felt he was assaulting all that country held dear). But with Moon riding shotgun, it couldn't have been anything but country."

On Nelson's "Me and Paul," Jennings changes the tag line to "me and Tompall," a reference to his good friend and fellow outlaw renegade Tompall Glaser, and he mentions Billy Joe Shaver by name on the Shaver-written "Willy the Wandering Gypsy and Me". On "Ladies Love Outlaws", he proclaims that "Outlaws touch ladies anywhere they want!" and utters a loud "goddamn" on "Laid Back Country Picker" and again menacingly on "The Taker," a rarity for a country singer on record at the time.

== Reception ==
Professional ratings
Review scores
Source	Rating
Allmusic	link

Waylon Live reached No. 1 on the Billboard country albums chart and No. 46 on the pop albums chart. Stephen Thomas Erlewine of AllMusic wrote, "As one of the great live albums, Waylon Live is nearly flawless, a snapshot of Waylon Jennings at the height of his powers...It winds up as one of the great country records and one of the great live albums, capturing a movement at its peak and transcending it." Marc Greilsamer of Amazon.com: "When the tapes rolled over three nights in the fall of 1974, Hoss and company were at the peak of their powers - growling menacingly at some times, purring seductively at others - with the steady, sturdy, unshakable rumble of bassist Duke Goff and drummer Richie Albright laying the groundwork and steel-guitar master Ralph Mooney vividly coloring throughout."

== Track listings ==
=== Original 1976 album ===
No.	Title	Writer(s)	Length
1.	"T for Texas"	Jimmie Rodgers	4:03
2.	"Rainy Day Woman"	Waylon Jennings	2:33
3.	"Me and Paul"	Willie Nelson	3:33
4.	"The Last Letter"	Rex Griffin	3:54
5.	"I'm a Ramblin' Man"	Ray Pennington	2:46
6.	"Bob Wills Is Still the King"	Jennings	3:18
7.	"Pick Up the Tempo"	Nelson	3:37
8.	"Good Hearted Woman"	Jennings, Nelson	2:59
9.	"House of the Rising Sun"	Traditional; arranged by Alan Price	3:41
10.	"Me and Bobby McGee"	Fred Foster, Kristofferson	4:46
11.	"This Time"	Jennings	4:14

=== 1999 CD ===
No.	Title	Writer(s)	Length
1.	"T for Texas"	Jimmie Rodgers	4:03
2.	"Rainy Day Woman"	Waylon Jennings	2:33
3.	"Me and Paul"	Willie Nelson	3:33
4.	"The Last Letter"	Rex Griffin	3:54
5.	"I'm a Ramblin' Man"	Ray Pennington	2:46
6.	"Bob Wills Is Still the King"	Jennings	3:18
7.	"Lovin' Her Was Easier (Than Anything I'll Ever Do Again)"	Kris Kristofferson	4:08
8.	"Look Into My Teardrops"	Don Bowman, Harlan Howard	2:39
9.	"Lonesome, On'ry and Mean"	Steve Young	3:13
10.	"Freedom to Stay"	Bill Hoover	3:59
11.	"Big Ball's in Cowtown"	Hoyle Nix	2:36
12.	"The Taker"	Kristofferson, Shel Silverstein	2:12
13.	"Mississippi Woman"	Red Lane	2:02
14.	"Mona"	Miriam Eddy	3:21
15.	"Never Been to Spain"	Hoyt Axton	5:05
16.	"Pick Up the Tempo"	Nelson	3:37
17.	"Good Hearted Woman"	Jennings, Nelson	2:59
18.	"House of the Rising Sun"	Traditional; arranged by Alan Price	3:41
19.	"Me and Bobby McGee"	Fred Foster, Kristofferson	4:46
20.	"This Time"	Jennings	4:14

=== 2003 CD ===
==== Disc one ====
Disc one
No.	Title	Length
1.	"T for Texas"	4:02
2.	"Stop the World (and Let Me Off)"	2:14
3.	"Lonesome, On'ry And Mean"	3:23
4.	"You Ask Me To"	2:35
5.	"Louisiana Woman"	3:47
6.	"I'm A Ramblin' Man"	2:46
7.	"Me And Paul"	3:41
8.	"It's Not Supposed to Be That Way"	2:42
9.	"Slow Rollin' Low"	3:16
10.	"Rainy Day Woman"	2:39
11.	"Good Hearted Woman"	3:05
12.	"Mental Revenge"	2:13
13.	"Amanda"	2:42
14.	"This Time"	4:04
15.	"Laid Back Country Picker"	2:57
16.	"The Last Letter"	3:57
17.	"Honky Tonk Heroes"	2:57
18.	"Willie, The Wandering Gypsy And Me"	2:37
19.	"Donna On My Mind"	2:21
20.	"We Had It All"	3:02

==== Disc two ====
Disc two
No.	Title	Length
1.	"Ladies Love Outlaws"	1:56
2.	"Big Ball In Cowtown"	2:41
3.	"Just to Satisfy You"	2:05
4.	"Anita You're Dreaming"	2:40
5.	"Big Big Love"	2:28
6.	"Me and Bobby McGee"	4:47
7.	"If You Could Touch Her At All"	3:01
8.	"Bob Wills Is Still The King"	3:20
9.	"Look Into My Teardrops"	2:42
10.	"Long Way From Home"	3:36
11.	"The Taker"	2:17
12.	"Mississippi Woman"	2:03
13.	"Mona"	3:19
14.	"Never Been to Spain"	5:14
15.	"Only Daddy That'll Walk the Line"	2:33
16.	"Freedom to Stay"	4:02
17.	"Lovin' Her Was Easier (Than Anything I'll Ever Do Again)"	4:06
18.	"Pick Up the Tempo"	3:37
19.	"Ain't No God in Mexico"	2:04
20.	"House of the Rising Sun"	3:43
21.	"Band Intros"	2:18
22.	"You Can Have Her"	2:11

== Personnel ==
Credits adapted from original and reissue versions of the album.

=== Musicians ===
- Waylon Jennings – vocals, lead guitar
- Richie Albright – drums
- Duke Goff – bass
- Larry Whitmore – 12-string guitar
- Roger Crabtree – harmonica
- Billy Ray Reynolds – harmony vocals, guitar
- Ralph Mooney – pedal steel

=== Technical and visuals ===
- Waylon Jennings — production, arrangement
- Ray Pennington — production
- Al Pachucki — engineer
- Randy Kling — engineer, mastering
- George Bennett — recording technician
- Neil Zlozower — photographer (original release)
- Jim Osborne — cover illustration (original release)
- Hot Graphics — art direction (original release)
- Scott Newton — photographer (reissue release)
- Rich Kienzle — liner notes

== Charts ==
=== Weekly charts ===
Chart (1976–1977)	Peak position
US Billboard 200	46
US Top Country Albums (Billboard)	1

=== Year-end charts ===
Chart (1977)	Position
US Top Country Albums (Billboard)	5

== Certifications ==
Region	Certification	Certified units/sales
United States (RIAA)	Gold	500,000^{^}
^{^} Shipments figures based on certification alone.
