= Cowboys and Dreamers =

Studio album by George Strait
- Released: September 6, 2024
- Genres: Neotraditional country; honky-tonk
- Length: 47:49
- Label: MCA Nashville
- Producers: Chuck Ainlay; Tony Brown; George Strait

George Strait chronology
Honky Tonk Time Machine (2019)	Cowboys and Dreamers (2024)

Cowboys and Dreamers is the thirty-first studio album by American country music artist George Strait. It was released on September 6, 2024, via MCA Nashville. The album's first promotional single, "MIA Down in MIA", was released on May 17, 2024.

Strait dedicated the album to longtime fiddle player of Ace in the Hole Band Gene Elders and manager Erv Woosley, who both died on March 20, 2024, as well as road manager Tom Foote, who died on April 29, 2024.

== Content ==
Strait announced the album on May 16, 2024, while performing at Lucas Oil Stadium. Three promotional singles — "MIA Down in MIA", "The Little Things", and "Three Drinks Behind" — were released ahead of the album. As with his last album, Honky Tonk Time Machine, Cowboys and Dreamers was co-produced by Chuck Ainlay.

While performing in 2024, Strait teased songs for Cowboys and Dreamers, including "Honky Tonk Hall of Fame" (featuring Chris Stapleton) and "Three Drinks Behind." "Waymore's Blues" was co-written and previously recorded by Waylon Jennings for his 1975 studio album, Dreaming My Dreams.

== Musical style and composition ==
Cowboys and Dreamers has been labeled primarily neotraditional country and honky-tonk by critics, with elements of Western swing.

== Commercial performance ==
Cowboys and Dreamers debuted at number 14 on the Billboard 200 and number six on the Billboard Top Country Albums chart, with first-week totals of 27,000 equivalent units.

== Track listing ==
Cowboys and Dreamers track listing
No.	Title	Writer(s)	Length
1.	"Three Drinks Behind"	Benjamin Gaither; Jeff Silvey; Kim Williams	3:39
2.	"Cowboys and Dreamers"	Jessie Jo Dillon; Keith Gattis; Bubba Strait	3:29
3.	"To the Moon"	Marty Brown; Steve Clark	3:12
4.	"MIA Down in MIA"	Adam Craig; Dean Dillon	3:29
5.	"Wish I Could Say"	Gattis	4:07
6.	"Calling from the Car"	Bobby Braddock	2:40
7.	"People Get Hurt Sometimes"	Jim Lauderdale; Kendell Marvel; Jimmy Ritchey	3:15
8.	"Honky Tonk Hall of Fame" (featuring Chris Stapleton)	Stapleton; Jameson Clark; Tim James	3:09
9.	"The Little Things"	George Strait; Monty Criswell; Bubba Strait	3:38
10.	"The Book"	G. Strait; D. Dillon; J. Dillon; B. Strait	3:10
11.	"Rent"	Guy Clark; Gattis	5:58
12.	"Waymore's Blues"	Curtis Buck; Waylon Jennings	4:44
13.	"The Journey of Your Life"	Ronnie Bowman; Troy Jones	3:19
Total length:			47:49

== Personnel ==
Musicians

- George Strait – lead vocals, acoustic guitar
- Marty Slayton – background vocals
- Wes Hightower – background vocals
- Glenn Worf – bass guitar (tracks 1–3, 6, 9, 13), upright bass (7, 8, 11)
- Eddie Bayers – drums (tracks 1–3, 6–11, 13)
- Brent Mason – electric guitar (tracks 1–3, 6–11, 13)
- Mac McAnally – acoustic guitar (tracks 1–3, 6, 7, 13)
- Paul Franklin – steel guitar (tracks 1–3, 6, 8, 9, 11, 13)
- Matt Rollings – Wurlitzer electric piano (tracks 1, 2, 9), piano (3, 6–9), Hammond B3 (11)
- Steve Nathan – synthesizer (tracks 1, 3, 9), Hammond B3 (8, 13)
- Stuart Duncan – mandolin (tracks 3, 13), fiddle (6, 8, 9, 11)
- Steve Gibson – acoustic guitar (tracks 3, 6, 8, 9, 11)
- Andrew Dunn – cello (tracks 3, 7, 13)
- Austin Hoke – cello (tracks 3, 7, 13)
- Kevin Bate – cello (tracks 3, 7, 13)
- Sari Reist – cello (tracks 3, 7, 13)
- Kristin Wilkinson – conductor (tracks 3, 7, 13)
- Chris Farrell – viola (tracks 3, 7, 13)
- Elizabeth Lamb – viola (tracks 3, 7, 13)
- Monisa Angell – viola (tracks 3, 7, 13)
- Seanad Chang – viola (tracks 3, 7, 13)
- Alison Hoffman – violin (tracks 3, 7, 13)
- Annaliese Kowert – violin (tracks 3, 7, 13)
- Carrie Bailey – violin (tracks 3, 7, 13)
- Conni Ellisor – violin (tracks 3, 7, 13)
- David Angell – violin (tracks 3, 7, 13)
- David Davidson – violin (tracks 3, 7, 13)
- Jenny Bifano – violin (tracks 3, 7, 13)
- Jung-Min Shin – violin (tracks 3, 7, 13)
- Karen Winkelmann – violin (tracks 3, 7, 13)
- Mary Kathryn Vanosdale – violin (tracks 3, 7, 13)
- Peter Otto – violin (tracks 3, 7, 13)
- WeiTsun Chang – violin (tracks 3, 7, 13)
- John Michael Whitby – Hammond B3 (tracks 4, 5, 7, 10, 12)
- Benny McArthur – acoustic guitar (tracks 4, 5, 10), electric guitar (12)
- Joe Manuel – acoustic guitar (tracks 4, 5, 10, 12)
- Terry Hale – bass guitar (tracks 4, 5, 10, 12)
- Bobby Jarzombek – drums (tracks 4, 5, 10, 12)
- Rick McRae – electric guitar (tracks 4, 5, 10, 12)
- Mike Daily – steel guitar (tracks 4, 5, 10, 12)
- Ronnie Huckaby – Wurlitzer electric piano (tracks 4, 5, 12), Wurlitzer organ (4), piano (10, 12)
- Gene Elders – mandolin (track 4), fiddle (5, 12)
- Chris Stapleton – acoustic guitar, lead vocals (track 8)

Technical

- George Strait – production
- Chuck Ainlay – production, mixing, engineering
- Tony Brown – production (tracks 1–3, 6–9, 11)
- Bob Ludwig – mastering
- Dan Harrison – engineering (track 2)
- Lance Van Dyke – additional engineering, engineering assistance
- Jon Clover Brown – engineering assistance (tracks 1–6, 8–13)
- Kaitlyn Walker – engineering assistance (tracks 3, 7, 13)
- Tate Sablatura – engineering assistance (tracks 3, 7, 13)
- Dan Flynn – engineering assistance (tracks 4, 5, 10, 12)
- Kristin Wilkinson – string arrangement (tracks 3, 7, 13)

== Charts ==
Chart performance for Cowboys and Dreamers
Chart (2024)	Peak position
Australian Country Albums (ARIA)	35
Scottish Albums (Official Charts)	51
Swiss Albums (Schweizer Hitparade)	71
UK Album Downloads (Official Charts)	52
UK Country Albums (Official Charts)	6
US Billboard 200	14
US Top Country Albums (Billboard)	6
