= Waymore's Blues =

Single by Waylon Jennings

from the album Dreaming My Dreams
- A-side: "Dreaming My Dreams with You"
- B-side: "Waymore's Blues"
- Released: 1975
- Recorded: September 3, 1974
- Genre: Outlaw country
- Length: 2:42
- Label: RCA Victor
- Songwriters: Waylon Jennings; Curtis Buck
- Producers: Waylon Jennings; Jack Clement

Waylon Jennings singles chronology
"Dreaming My Dreams with You" (1975)	"Waymore's Blues" (1975)	"Can't You See" (1976)

"Waymore's Blues" is a song written and recorded by American country music artist Waylon Jennings. It was released in 1975 as the B-side to Dreaming My Dreams with You from the album of the same name.

== Composition and recording ==
The song itself borrows heavily from Furry Lewis' 1928 single Kassie Jones. It interpolates several portions of Lewis' song, which itself is a tribute to Casey Jones.

The track starts out its 1st verse recounting the tale of Jimmie Rodgers going onto state "Jimmie he's dead, he's been a long time gone" with Rodgers having passed away in 1933, 42 years before its release. In the 3rd verse Waylon speaks of his marriage to Jessi Colter, calling her "a good woman" but also speaking of his struggles with infidelity, stating at the end of the verse "but every woman she sees looks like a place I came in", a very taboo line for the time. He later references Rodgers once again, while closing out the song in its 4th and final verse stating "I got my name painted on my shirt, I ain't no ordinary dude, I don't have to work" a line taken almost verbatim from Blue Yodel No. 9.

== Chart performance ==
Chart (1975)	Peak position
US Bubbling Under Hot 100 (Billboard)	110

== Cover versions ==
- Johnny Cash, Roy Orbison, Jerry Lee Lewis, and Carl Perkins recorded the song for their 1986 album Class of '55: Memphis Rock & Roll Homecoming
- J.J. Cale recorded the song and released it on his 2007 album Rewind: Unreleased Recordings
- Shooter Jennings, Waylon's youngest son, recorded the song as a duet with Waylon in the late-1990s. It was then released in 2 different versions with one being on the 2008 album Waylon Forever and one being on the 2014 album Fenixon.
- Justin McBride covered the song in 2010 on his Live at Billy Bob's Texas: Justin McBride album.
- Hank Williams Jr. covered the song in 2012 on the tribute album The Music Inside: A Collaboration Dedicated To Waylon Jennings, Volume II.
- George Strait covered the song on his 2024 album Cowboys and Dreamers as the albums 12th and 2nd to final track.
- Whitey Morgan and the 78s covered the song in a live performance in 2024 and released it on their 2025 album Live from Bandit Town USA.

== Legacy ==
The track has appeared in several films and television shows such as True Detective (2014), Too Late (2015), and Borderline (2025).

Waylon's original 1975 version of the song is set to appear in 2026's Grand Theft Auto VI releasing on November 19.
