= Just to Satisfy You =

Just to Satisfy You may refer to:

- Just to Satisfy You (album), a 1969 Waylon Jennings album released on RCA Records.
- Just to Satisfy You (song), a song written by Don Bowman and Waylon Jennings, released by A&M Records in 1964.
