= 20th Century Masters – The Millennium Collection: The Best of Waylon Jennings =

Greatest hits album by Waylon Jennings
- Released: May 9, 2000
- Genre: Country; outlaw country
- Length: 34:20
- Label: MCA Nashville
- Producer: Various

Waylon Jennings chronology
Closing in on the Fire (1998)	20th Century Masters – The Millennium Collection: The Best of Waylon Jennings (2000)	Never Say Die: Live (2000)

20th Century Masters – The Millennium Collection: The Best of Waylon Jennings is the eighteenth compilation album by American country music artist Waylon Jennings, released on MCA Nashville on May 9, 2000. It contains material from the singer's short tenure at MCA; this includes three tracks from Will the Wolf Survive (1986), two from Hangin' Tough (1987), another two from A Man Called Hoss (1987) and four from Full Circle (1988).

== Track listing ==
No.	Title	Writer(s)	Length
1.	"Rough and Rowdy Days"	Waylon Jennings, Roger Murrah	2:31
2.	"If Ole Hank Could Only See Us Now"	Jennings, Murrah	2:51
3.	"Working Without a Net"	Don Cook, John Barlow Jarvis, Gary Nicholson	2:40
4.	"What You'll Do When I'm Gone"	Larry Butler	2:55
5.	"Rose in Paradise"	Jim McBride, Stewart Harris	3:36
6.	"Fallin' Out"	Denny Lile	3:33
7.	"Which Way Do I Go (Now That I'm Gone)"	Johnny MacRae, Steve Clark	3:09
8.	"How Much Is It Worth to Live in L.A."	Jennings, Murrah	2:53
9.	"You Put the Soul in the Song"	Don Goodman, Tim Gaetano, John B. Detterline	3:32
10.	"Trouble Man"	Jennings, Tony Joe White	3:16
11.	"Will the Wolf Survive"	David Hidalgo, Louie Pérez	3:24

== Critical reception ==
Professional ratings
Review scores
Source	Rating
AllMusic	3/5 stars

20th Century Masters – The Millennium Collection: The Best of Waylon Jennings received three out of five stars from Steve Huey of AllMusic. In his review, Huey states that "the compilation demonstrates that Jennings did produce some quality work during his time with MCA" and is "a worthy addition to the collections of devoted fans."

== Chart performance ==
20th Century Masters – The Millennium Collection: The Best of Waylon Jennings peaked at number 67 on the U.S. Billboard Top Country Albums chart.

Chart (2002)	Peak position
U.S. Billboard Top Country Albums	67
