= Mackintosh and T.J. =

1975 film by Marvin J. Chomsky

- Original film poster
- Directed by: Marvin J. Chomsky
- Produced by: Tim Penland
- Starring: Roy Rogers; Clay O'Brien; Billy Green Bush; Andrew Robinson; Joan Hackett
- Cinematography: Terry K. Meade
- Music by: Waylon Jennings
- Release date: November 21, 1975
- Country: United States
- Language: English

Mackintosh and T.J. is a 1975 American modern day Western film starring Roy Rogers in his last feature film appearance in a film that was specifically written for him. Prior to this film his most recent feature film appearances were in the Bob Hope films Son of Paleface (1952) and 1959's Alias Jesse James (a cameo).

== Plot ==
MacKintosh is an aging migrant cowboy drifting from ranch to ranch, taking whatever work is available. When stopping at a town for gas, plus water for his old truck's leaking radiator, he sees T.J., a 14-year-old recently released from doing clean up work for vagrancy. Shopping for supplies, MacKintosh sights T.J. preparing to steal an apple while being watched by the store owner. MacKintosh pretends the boy is with him and pays for their supplies.

Giving T.J. a ride the two realize they have much in common. Having left his single mother and not having been in school since Dick and Jane books were used (early primary school), T.J. is off to work his way to the Pacific Ocean that he has never seen. When MacKintosh's vehicle breaks down T.J. catches a lift with a well dressed stranger on his way to El Paso as MacKintosh makes his repairs.

Stopping for dinner in a bar that night, MacKintosh sights T.J. working as a busboy in the bar. T.J. explains that the man who picked him up was "funny" (homosexual), and that made T.J. leave him as quickly as possible. A drunken loud cowboy named Cal misplaces his money and accuses T.J. of stealing. When Cal strikes T.J., MacKintosh knocks him down. Cal comes after MacKintosh with a knife, but MacKintosh knocks him down again by breaking a catsup bottle on his head. After the fight, it was discovered that Cal's money had fallen to the floor. T.J. and MacKintosh team up again.

The pair find work at the 6666 Ranch run by Jim Webster, and MacKintosh impresses everyone when he breaks horses. T.J. is put to work cleaning up abandoned buildings. The work was to end after the horses were broken, but the man hired to trap coyotes was found with rabies, and Webster offers MacKintosh the sick man's job. He would live in a remote cabin, earn the wage of a ranch hand, plus get cash bounties for all coyotes he shoots. MacKintosh and T.J. settle in until accusations are made against the older man for his being too friendly to the battered wife of a ranch hand named Luke. At a birthday party for Webster Luke punches MacKintosh for standing next to his wife. MacKintosh says that he'll assume the alcohol Luke had been drinking caused his anger, so he'll forgive him. Then he warns that if Luke ever hits him again he'll beat him within an inch of his life.

Late that evening a ranch hand, who is a Peeping Tom, is caught by Luke looking into a window at his wife. The two have a knock-down fight and the ranch hand grabs hold of a rock and bashes it against Luke's head, killing the man. When Luke's wife telephones for help several ranch hands show up, assume MacKintosh is responsible, and go after him. They are prevented from killing him by Webster arriving on the scene and saying that the man is innocent. The Peeping Tom ranch hand had been wracked with guilt, wrote down what happened, and hanged himself from the top of a windmill.

MacKintosh and T.J. leave the ranch, and head for the Pacific Ocean, planning to look for work along the way.

== Cast ==
- Roy Rogers as Mackintosh
- Clay O'Brien as T.J.
- Billy Green Bush as Luke
- Andrew Robinson as Coley Phipps
- Joan Hackett as Maggie
- James Hampton as "Cotton"
- Dennis Fimple as Schuster
- Luke Askew as Cal
- Walter Barnes as Jim Webster
- Edith Atwater as Mrs. Webster
- Larry Mahan as Dan

== Production ==
Producer Tim Penland explained that the funding of the film came from twenty investors from Fort Worth, Texas and Tulsa, Oklahoma, who also played extras.

On casting Roy Rogers, Penland said he was their first choice but it was challenging since Rogers hadn't acted in a motion picture over twenty years.

Rogers said that "over the years I have been presented with scripts to entice me back to movies but I have not gone for any of them. I don't care for explicit violence — all that blood and guts over the screen. But the script for this film is worthy of viewing by all members of the family."

The film was shot on Texas locations at the 6666 Ranch. Waylon Jennings provided several songs for the film and released a soundtrack album. Former child star Claude Jarman Jr. acted as a production manager on the film.

== See also ==
- List of American films of 1975
