= Mackintosh & T.J. =

Music from 'Mackintosh & T.J.'

Soundtrack album by Waylon Jennings
- Released: March 1976
- Genre: Country; outlaw country
- Label: RCA Victor
- Producer: Waylon Jennings; Ritchie Albright

Waylon Jennings chronology
Wanted! The Outlaws (1976)	Music from 'Mackintosh & T.J.' (1976)	Are You Ready for the Country (1976)

Music from 'Mackintosh & T.J.' is a soundtrack album to the film of the same name, featuring four songs performed by Waylon Jennings, another by Willie Nelson, and several featuring Jennings' backing band The Waylors. The record was released on RCA Victor in March 1976, following the film which had come out in November 1975. Three of the Jennings songs had been previously unreleased; four of the tracks on the album are instrumentals. The album peaked at #16 on the country charts.

AllMusic said of the soundtrack, "Actually, only four tracks are by Jennings (and one of those is a repeat) and probably of little interest to anyone but a collector." The repeat was a reference to "All Around Cowboy", which appears twice on the album. A live version of "Bob Wills Is Still the King" had appeared on his 1975 album Dreaming My Dreams; the Mackintosh & T.J. version, however, is a studio recording . A different recording of "Ride Me Down Easy" appeared on Honky Tonk Heroes (1973). Willie Nelson's track, "(Stay All Night) Stay a Little Longer", previously appeared on Willie's 1973 Atlantic album, Shotgun Willie.

Professional ratings
Review scores
Source	Rating
Allmusic	link

== Track listing ==
1. "All Around Cowboy" – Waylon Jennings (Jack Wesley Routh, Len Pollard) – 2:55
2. "Back in the Saddle Again" – The Waylors (Gene Autry, Ray Whitley) – 2:25
3. "Ride Me Down Easy" – Waylon Jennings (Billy Joe Shaver) – 2:40
4. "Gardenia Waltz" – Johnny Gimble with the Waylors – (Johnny Gimble) – 2:00
5. "Bob Wills Is Still the King" – Waylon Jennings (Jennings) – 3:00
6. "Shopping" – The Waylors (Jennings) – 2:06
7. "(Stay All Night) Stay a Little Longer" – Willie Nelson (Bob Wills, Tommy Duncan) – 2:32
8. "Crazy Arms" – The Waylors with Ralph Mooney (Ralph Mooney, Chuck Seals) – 2:59
9. "All Around Cowboy" – Waylon Jennings (Routh, Pollard) – 2:48
