= Bob Wills Is Still the King =

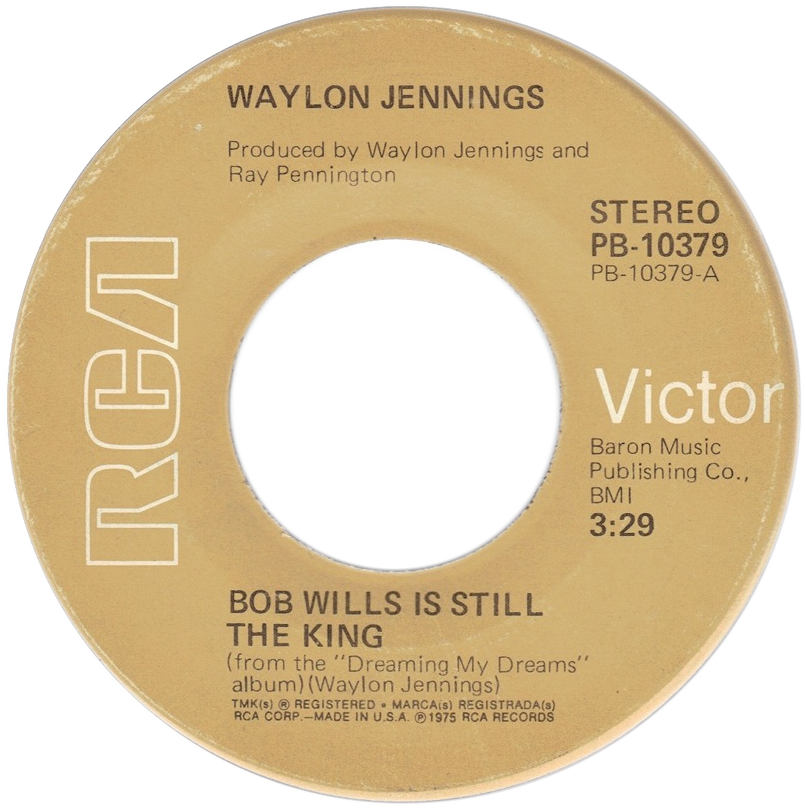

Song by Waylon Jennings

from the album Dreaming My Dreams
- B-side: "Are You Sure Hank Done It This Way"
- Released: August 1975
- Recorded: September 27, 1974
- Genre: Country
- Length: 3:29
- Label: RCA Victor
- Songwriter: Waylon Jennings
- Producers: Waylon Jennings; Ray Pennington

"Bob Wills Is Still the King" is a song written and performed by American country music artist Waylon Jennings, as a tribute to the Western swing musician Bob Wills.

There are two main versions of the song. A live recording of the song was released in June 1975 as the closing track on the album Dreaming My Dreams, and then appeared in August 1975 as the A-side of "Are You Sure Hank Done It This Way", the second single from the album. By early November, the B-side had risen to number one on the country singles chart, but the A-side gained considerable airplay as well, enough so that Billboard listed it as a two-sided hit whereas Cashbox showed it with just the B-side listed. A studio version of the song was released in March 1976 on the Mackintosh & T.J. film soundtrack.

The exact meaning of the song, which also alludes to Jennings' fellow outlaw country star Willie Nelson, has been the subject of considerable commentary. Nonetheless "Bob Wills Is Still the King" continues to be a staple at classic country radio stations and the satellite radio channel Willie's Roadhouse plays both versions of the song. The live version is included in Classic Country Music: A Smithsonian Collection, a multi-volume set of recordings released by the Smithsonian Institution in 1990 that contains 100 tracks deemed to be significantly important to the history of country music.

== Composition and recording ==
The song was composed sometime before September 27, 1974, when the live version was recorded at the Texas Opry House in Austin, Texas before what owner Willie Nelson later described as "a crowd that had jammed in there shoulder to shoulder so tight that even the fire marshall couldn't get out." Nelson also believed that this was the first time the song had been performed in public. Despite their unfamiliarity with it, the audience responds robustly to each mention of Texas in the song. The live recording was produced by Jennings and Ray Pennington.

The song contains allusions to the Wills song "San Antonio Rose", Wills singer Tommy Duncan, Wills band the Texas Playboys, the existence of honky-tonks in Texas, the Grand Ole Opry in Nashville, and the Red River that denotes one of the boundaries of Texas. The song also quotes from "At The Crossroads" ("You just can't live in Texas if you ain't got a whole lot of soul"), a 1969 record by the Sir Douglas Quintet. The music to the song is not obviously Western swing nor does it sound like Bob Wills. Nor for that matter is it straight country music; rather, it is a slow-tempo mixture of country, country rock, and rockabilly with some possible hints of Western swing. The basic group instrumentation features pedal steel guitar and harmonica, both of which lend credibility to the performance's Western origins.

The song gained some renown even before it was released on record, as one verse of it was quoted by a United Press International story published on May 14, 1975, following the death of Wills the day before:

You can hear the Grand Ol' Opry in Nashville, Tennessee
It's the home of country music, on that we all agree
But when you cross that ol' Red River, hoss,
That just don't mean a thing.
Once you're down in Texas, Bob Wills is still the King.

The song concludes, in another verse about Texas, with lines directed at his friend and occasional collaborator:

It's the home of Willie Nelson, the home of Western swing
He'll be the first to tell you, Bob Wills is still the King.

Jennings played the song at one of the early instantiations of the Willie Nelson's Fourth of July Picnic and later wrote that in the wild environment of that setting, women started taking their clothes off during the song, leading to an orgy taking place on one side of the audience.

The studio version, whose date of recording is unclear, is 3:00 long, and was produced by Waylon Jennings and Richard (Ritchie) Albright. It is shorter than the live version because it omits the spoken introduction and pauses in the singing for audience reaction. It does however include a false ending followed by an instrumental outro of the fiddle theme from the Bob Wills classic hit "Faded Love". This outro had not been present in the recorded live version, thus making it hard to hear echoes of Western swing in that arrangement.

The album Waylon Live, released in December 1976, was recorded at the same performances that produced "Bob Wills Is Still the King", and included that version again.

== Charts and performance ==
By October 1975, the single had reached the top ten of country charts, with Billboard showing both side of it in its listings. Indeed, some outlets such as WTHI-FM in Terre Haute, Indiana listed "Bob Wills Is Still the King" first rather than "Are You Sure Hank Done It This Way".

By early November 1975, the single had reached the top spot on both the Billboard country chart (with both sides listed) and the Cashbox country chart (with just the A-side listed). "Bob Wills Is Still the King" did well both on traditional hits-oriented country stations, such as KVET-AM in Austin, as well as on the newer progressive country stations, such as KOKE-FM, also in the Austin area.

== Themes and interpretations ==
The piece, which Jennings introduces in the live version as "a song I wrote on a plane between Dallas and Austin," appears on the surface to be plainspoken tribute to Bob Wills. After all, Jennings says in the introduction that it was "about a man that has as much to do with why we're down here as anybody."

But in fact it took aim at country trends, including the outlaw country movement that he and friend Willie Nelson had done so much to create. As author Michael Striessguth observes, "It was another delightful example of Waylon's eagerness to poke fun at the highfalutin music industry, in this case, Willie Nelson and the redneck rock thing down in Texas. It don't matter who's in Austin/Bob Wills is still the king."

In Nicholas R. Spitzer's essay "Romantic Regionalism and Convergent Culture in Central Texas", which was published in 1975 and contains a determined exegesis of the song, he states that "The crowd hoots and hollers on cue in a manner that from participant-observation I would describe as self-conscious. That is, they are themselves performing in a fashion presumed to be truly Texan."

In part inspired by Spitzer, the song has since generated a fair amount of culturally based scholarly attention. Indeed, American Studies professor Barry Shank has presented a sort of historiography of it. Lecturer Trent Hill believes that the song best exemplifies the "complexities of country tradition as well as its differences with the modernist, 'rockist' version of tradition". Hill says that it is possible that the song is best viewed as "a complicated joke", with it being unclear exactly who all the targets of the joke are. In a somewhat similar vein, cultural historian Jason Mellard writes that the song illustrates how the Wills tradition and Western swing became "strange bedfellows" of the progressive country movement: "... for 1970s cosmic cowboys to ground a performance of Anglo-Texan masculinity of the figure of Bob Wills connoted, at different times, either a subtle recognition or a willed erasure of the patchwork nature of that identity's cultural forms."

In terms of regular music criticism, Fred Schruers' review of the containing album in The Rolling Stone Record Guide of 1979, which he gave four out of five stars, termed the song "live and fierce in Austin" and contributing to the album's ability to "showcase a determinedly history-minded Waylon." Stephen Thomas Erlewine's review for All Music Guide states that the A- and B-sides of the single, which open and close Dreaming My Dreams, make Jennings "an heir apparent to [the] legacies" of the subjects of those two songs.

And in any case, people in Texas came to identify with the song. The work of the Austin-based group Asleep at the Wheel helped to keep popular knowledge of Wills going, and they collaborated with Clint Black on a new version of "Bob Wills Is Still the King" on a 1999 tribute album Ride With Bob. Another recording of the song by Asleep at the Wheel, this time in collaboration with Waylon's son Shooter Jennings together with Randy Rogers and Reckless Kelly, appeared on the 2015 effort Still the King: Celebrating the Music of Bob Wills and His Texas Playboys. The song itself is collected on several Jennings live sets, compilations, and box sets, including RCA Country Legends (2001 compilation, includes studio version), Live from Austin, TX (recorded 1989, released 2006), and Nashville Rebel (2006 box set including studio version). Perhaps the most unexpected appearance was a performance by The Rolling Stones in Austin in 2006 during their A Bigger Bang Tour. Their arrangement featuring Ronnie Wood playing pedal steel guitar was captured on their 2007 The Biggest Bang concert DVD release.

Willie Nelson's 2015 memoir It's a Long Story interprets the song as a good-natured jibe against him, one that Jennings had specially prepared once he knew he would be recording a live album in Nelson's Texas Opry House. In his telling, he was present when Jennings sang it and praised it once the singer came offstage. And he wrote in 2015, "Truth be told, I really did like the song. And besides, he'd sung the gospel truth: far as I was concerned, Bob Wills was still the king." Indeed, in his earlier 1988 work, Willie: An Autobiography, Nelson had described growing up and witnessing Bob Wills as a charismatic, magnetic force – comparable to Elvis Presley or John the Baptist. From watching Wills in action, through good nights and bad, Nelson said he learned how to be a compelling front man of a band.

Jennings wrote in liner notes for a later compilation box set of his, "I never was a big Bob Wills fan." The singer says in his memoir that the song was about his early days in playing clubs in Texas that "had those big Bob Wills dance floors. ... I'd get up on the long bandstand, built for a twelve-piece cowboy orchestra, and I'd be telling my four guys to start spreading out." He continues that the audience was frustrated by his songs he played that were difficult to dance to.

This was echoed on the 1990s cable television show Ryman Country Homecoming, which featured country music legends discussing and playing some of their most famous songs to each other, host Ralph Emery asks him, "Waylon, were you like a lot of kids in Texas when you grew up, were you a big fan of Bob Wills?" To which Jennings replies, "No, I wasn't," provoking laughter from his fellow musicians, after which he added, "I liked two of his songs. I really did. That was a misconception." Jennings then proceeds to say the song was about a couple of things, the first being the point about playing with a small group on a large Wills-sized stage. But he then digresses into an exchange in praise of Glen Campbell and never gets to the second thing. Then in his singing of it, he changes the reference in the next-to-last line to "It's the home of Willie what's-his-name", earning a playful bonk on the head from Nelson, who was sitting next to him and laughing.

Indeed, one Nelson biographer, Joe Nick Patoski, believes that despite all the analysis, the song is a straight ode to Wills and that the rivalry aspect has been overstated: "Waylon's song simply put the whole [outlaw] movement in perspective: Both he and Willie were sons of Bob Wills, who put Texas music on the map."

== Personnel ==
Players on the live version:

- Waylon Jennings – vocals, lead guitar
- Richie Albright – drums
- Duke Goff – bass
- Larry Whitmore – 12-string guitar
- Roger Crabtree – harmonica
- Billy Ray Reynolds – guitar, harmony
- Ralph Mooney – steel guitar
