= Dreaming My Dreams with You =

Single by Waylon Jennings

from the album Dreaming My Dreams
- B-side: "Waymore's Blues"
- Released: 1975
- Recorded: September 3, 1974
- Genre: Country
- Length: 2:27
- Label: RCA Victor
- Songwriter: Allen Reynolds
- Producers: Waylon Jennings, Jack Clement

Waylon Jennings singles chronology
"Rainy Day Woman" (1975)	"Dreaming My Dreams with You" (1975)	"Are You Sure Hank Done It This Way" (1975)

"Dreaming My Dreams with You" is a song written by Allen Reynolds, and recorded by Waylon Jennings' for his 1975 album, Dreaming My Dreams. Jennings' version was also released as a single that year.

The song has been covered by many artists including Bria Salmena, Emmylou Harris and Rodney Crowell, Cowboy Jack Clement, Cowboy Junkies, Alison Krauss, Jamey Johnson, Crystal Gayle, Patty Loveless, Martina McBride, Mark Chesnutt, John Prine and Kathy Mattea, Marianne Faithfull, Jewel, Collin Raye, and Charles Esten. A version of the song was also used in Nicholas Roeg's 1980 film Bad Timing.

In June 2026, CBS News included the song in its list of the 250 essential American songs of the past 250 years.

== Charts ==
Chart (1975)	Peak position
US Hot Country Songs (Billboard)	10

== Marianne Faithfull version ==
In 1975, British recording artist Marianne Faithfull released a version which peaked at number 1 in Ireland.

=== Charts ===
==== Weekly charts ====
Weekly chart performance for "Dreamin' My Dreams"
Chart (1976)	Peak position
Ireland (IRMA)	1

== Colleen Hewett version ==
In 1979, Australian recording artist Colleen Hewett released a version which peaked at number 2 in Australia and was certified gold.

=== Charts ===
==== Weekly charts ====
Weekly chart performance for "Dreaming My Dreams with You"
Chart (1979–1980)	Peak position
Australia (Kent Music Report)	2
New Zealand (Recorded Music NZ)	34

==== Year-end charts ====
Year-end chart performance for "Dreaming My Dreams with You"
Chart (1980)	Position
Australia (Kent Music Report)	4
