= The Wurlitzer Prize (I Don't Want to Get Over You) =

Single by Waylon Jennings

from the album Waylon & Willie
- B-side: "Lookin' for a Feeling"
- Released: September 1977
- Genre: Country
- Length: 2:08
- Label: RCA Victor
- Songwriters: Bobby Emmons; Chips Moman
- Producers: Waylon Jennings; Willie Nelson

Waylon Jennings singles chronology
"Luckenbach, Texas (Back to the Basics of Love)" (1977)	"The Wurlitzer Prize (I Don't Want to Get Over You)" (1977)	"Mammas Don't Let Your Babies Grow Up to Be Cowboys" (1978)

"The Wurlitzer Prize (I Don't Want to Get Over You)" is a song written by Chips Moman and Bobby Emmons, and recorded by American country music artist Waylon Jennings. It was released in September 1977 as the first single from the album Waylon & Willie. The song was Jennings' sixth number one on the country charts. The single spent two weeks at the top and a total of eleven weeks on the chart.

== Chart performance ==
Chart (1977)	Peak position
US Hot Country Songs (Billboard)	1
Canadian RPM Country Tracks	1

== Cover versions ==
- Kacey Musgraves covered the track in 2017 as a part of a tribute show to Jennings, the live album of which was released the same year.
