= Only the Greatest =

Studio album by Waylon Jennings
- Released: July 1968
- Recorded: 28:44
- Studio: RCA Studio A (Nashville, Tennessee)
- Genre: Country
- Label: RCA Victor
- Producer: Chet Atkins

Waylon Jennings chronology
Hangin' On (1968)	Only the Greatest (1968)	Jewels (1968)

Only the Greatest is the ninth studio album by American country music artist Waylon Jennings, released in 1968 on RCA Victor. It includes the single "Only Daddy That'll Walk the Line," which Jennings took to #2 on the country music charts that year.

== Background ==
Only the Greatest was Jennings eighth LP for RCA Victor in four years. Contrary to the title, it is not a "best of" package, although it does contain the singer's first pair of Top 5 country hits: "Walk On Out of My Mind," which rose to #5, and "Only Daddy That'll Walk the Line, which peaked at #2. Written by Jimmy Bryant, "Only Daddy That'll Walk the Line" was released in July 1968 as the second single from Only the Greatest. Billboard, in a review of the album, said that it and "Walk On Out of My Mind" were "typical of the robust, compelling vocal style" that Jennings became known for. Nathan Brackett and Christian Hoard, in The New Rolling Stone Album Guide, wrote that Jennings began to "really assert his rough-hewn sensibility" on "Only Daddy That'll Walk the Line." The song spent eighteen weeks on the Hot Country Singles charts, peaking at #2 and holding that peak for five weeks. In his autobiography Waylon, Jennings recalled of the song, "I waited a damn year to cut that song; Charlie Louvin's bass player had the original version for Capitol [Records]. I didn't want to cover him. I think he outsang me on it, but I had the best track. I knew it had the potential to go all the way, and it might had not 'Harper Valley P.T.A.' kept it out of the number-one slot."

In Canada, the song reached Number One on the RPM Country Tracks charts for the week ending September 30, 1968. Jennings would perform the song as part of a medley on The Johnny Cash Show. Although the single was Jennings' biggest success yet, he was chafing under the constrictions imposed by RCA Victor, and remained frustrated that the strapping sound of his live shows with his backing band the Waylors was not coming across on record with the studio musicians that played on his recordings.

The album primarily relied on other songwriters, including Harlan Howard, Bobby Bare, Jerry Chesnut, Billy Sherrill, and Neil Diamond.

Professional ratings
Review scores
Source	Rating
Allmusic	3.5/5 stars

== Track listing ==
No.	Title	Writer(s)	Length
1.	"Only Daddy That'll Walk the Line"	Ivy Bryant	2:21
2.	"California Sunshine"	Harlan Howard	2:13
3.	"Weakness in a Man"	Jerry Chesnut	2:51
4.	"Sorrow (Breaks a Good Man Down)"	Jackson King, Jimmy Rule	2:08
5.	"Christina"	Steve Karliski	2:14
6.	"Such a Waste of Love"	Bobby Bare	2:34
7.	"Walk On Out of My Mind"	Red Lane	2:21
8.	"Kentucky Woman"	Neil Diamond	2:21
9.	"Long Gone"	Jerry Reed	2:31
10.	"You'll Think of Me"	Hank Cochran	2:12
11.	"Wave Goodbye to Me"	King, Don Bowman	2:04
12.	"Too Far Gone"	Billy Sherrill	2:54
