= Hangin' Tough (Waylon Jennings album) =

1987 album by Waylon Jennings

Studio album by Waylon Jennings
- Released: January 1987
- Recorded: Groundstar Lab, Nashville; Sound Stage Studio, Nashville
- Genres: Country; outlaw country
- Length: 36:17
- Label: MCA
- Producers: Jimmy Bowen; Waylon Jennings

Waylon Jennings chronology
The Best of Waylon (1986)	Hangin' Tough (1987)	A Man Called Hoss (1987)

Singles from Hangin' Tough
- 1. "Rose in Paradise" Released: January 1987; 2. "Fallin' Out" Released: May 16, 1987

Professional ratings
Review scores
Source	Rating
AllMusic	2/5 stars

Hangin' Tough is the thirty-fifth studio album by American country music artist Waylon Jennings, released on MCA Records in 1987.

Jennings, who was only recently drug-free at the time of the sessions, later expressed disappointment with the album and his performance: "After I signed with MCA, we gave it out best shot, through a couple of albums...On Will the Wolf Survive? and Hangin' Tough, it was like I was off in a corner of a separate room, clouded by delay, distanced. I wasn't leading the band. I was trying to get my feet back on the ground, and that took as much concentration as singing. Though I was off drugs, I was still smoking heavily, and my voice showed the wear and tear."

== Track listing ==
No.	Title	Writer(s)	Length
1.	"Baker Street"	Gerry Rafferty	4:33
2.	"I Can't Help the Way I Don't Feel About You"	Chris Waters, Michael Garvin, Tom Shapiro	4:21
3.	"Rose in Paradise"	Jim McBride, Stewart Harris	3:42
4.	"Crying Don't Even Come Close"	Steve Gillette, Charles John Quarto	2:28
5.	"Chevy Van"	Sammy Johns	3:06
6.	"Fallin' Out"	Denny Lile	3:35
7.	"Deep in the West"	Shake Russell	3:58
8.	"Between Fathers and Sons"	Gary Nicholson, John Barlow Jarvis	3:18
9.	"The Crown Prince"	Roger Murrah, Jim McBride	4:08
10.	"Defying Gravity (Executioner's Song)"	Jesse Winchester	3:31

== Personnel ==
- Waylon Jennings - lead and backing vocals
- Richard Bennett - acoustic guitar
- Matt Betton - drums
- Jerry Bridges - bass guitar
- Larry Byrom - electric guitar
- John Jarvis - piano, synthesizer
- Ralph Mooney - steel guitar
- Mark O'Connor - mandola, mandolin
- Steve Schaffer - synclavier
- Gary Scruggs - electric guitar, acoustic guitar
- Billy Joe Walker, Jr. - electric guitar, acoustic guitar
- Curtis "Mr. Harmony" Young - background vocals
- Reggie Young - electric guitar

== Chart performance ==
Chart (1987)	Peak position
US Top Country Albums (Billboard)	19
