= Country-Folk =

Studio album by Waylon Jennings and The Kimberlys
- Released: August 1969
- Studios: RCA Studio A (Nashville, Tennessee)
- Genre: Country
- Label: RCA Victor
- Producers: Chet Atkins; Danny Davis

Waylon Jennings and The Kimberlys chronology
| Just to Satisfy You (1969) | Country-Folk (1969) | Waylon (1970) |

Professional ratings
Review scores
| Source | Rating |
|---|---|
| Allmusic | 3.5/5 stars |

Country-Folk is a collaborative studio album by American country music artist Waylon Jennings featuring the Kimberlys on vocals. It was released in 1969 on RCA Victor.

== Background ==
On Country-Folk, Jennings worked with producer Danny Davis, a New York City veteran who had produced Connie Francis and Nina Simone. RCA Victor executive Chet Atkins, who also produced Jennings' albums, had called Waylon's 1966 debut Folk-Country in an attempt to market the singer to this new, younger audience, and this idea continued on Country-Folk. Jennings, who was unhappy with the sound of his records at RCA Victor despite decent sales, butted heads with his new producer. In Michael Striessguth's book Outlaw: Waylon, Willie, Kris, and the Renegades of Nashville, Jennings guitarist Billy Ray Reynolds recalls, "Waylon liked Danny but the chemistry wasn't there. He [Davis] was a good guy but he had a little bit more of a New York attitude than Waylon was used to. They do things a little differently up there. They don't pull their punches." in his own memoir, Jennings agreed:

Chet had decided to leave producing and return to playing music, and he put me with Danny Davis. He couldn't have made a worse choice. We were like oil and water. I've always had a tendency to treat people right, with respect and honor. But I came pretty close to putting my hands around Danny's throat on more than one occasion, and I suspect he didn't like me much either...Danny didn't care what I was about; in his eyes, the producer was there to control the artist.

The Kimberlys were a quartet consisting of two brothers from Oklahoma and their wives, who are also sisters. The liner notes state that they were familiar to other musicians in the Las Vegas area. Jennings intended to gain for them a wider audience with this album. Three of the songs on the album are written or co-written by Harold Gay, one of the members. The album is best remembered for its version of Jimmy Webb's "MacArthur Park," which rose to #23 on the Billboard country charts and won a Grammy for Best Country Performance by a Duo or Group. In his autobiography, Jennings insisted he had a vision for the song from the start: "Danny and I got into it a couple of times over the arrangement. I knew exactly what I wanted the strings to do; I had to hum the parts. He probably had his own ideas. But the single got into the Top Twenty Five that fall...By then, everybody was more than happy to claim it was their idea." Jennings also speculated that him broaching the idea of covering the song was when Chet Atkins "thought I was too far gone and turned me over to Danny."

== Critical reception ==
Country-Folk reached number 13 on the Billboard country album charts. In 2013 author Michael Streissguth noted, "To say the least, it was an unusual outing that spouted from Waylon's romance with Verna Gay Kimberly...Nothing recorded before or after in Waylon's discography sounded like this album. Monstrous orchestral arrangements alternated with a cherry folk that echoed the Seekers...Despite the Grammy, the album soon receded into country music trivia."

== Track listing ==
| No. | Title | Writer(s) | Length |
|---|---|---|---|
| 1. | "MacArthur Park" | Jimmy Webb | 5:10 |
| 2. | "These New Changing Times" | Harold Gay, Waylon Jennings | 2:56 |
| 3. | "Come Stay with Me" | Jackie DeShannon | 2:45 |
| 4. | "Cindy, Oh Cindy" | Bob Barron, Burt Long | 2:45 |
| 5. | "Games People Play" | Joe South | 3:14 |
| 6. | "Mary Ann Regrets" | Harlan Howard | 3:54 |
| 7. | "Let Me Tell You My Mind" | Gay, Walt Rogers | 2:58 |
| 8. | "Drivin' Nails in the Wall" | Gay | 2:37 |
| 9. | "Long Way Back Home" | Gordon Lightfoot | 2:53 |
| 10. | "But You Know I Love You" | Mike Settle | 2:33 |
| 11. | "A World of Our Own" | Tom Springfield | 2:04 |

== Bibliography ==
- Jennings, Waylon; Kaye, Lenny (1996). Waylon: An Autobiography. Warner Brooks. ISBN 978-0-446-51865-9.
