= Closing In on the Fire =

Studio album by Waylon Jennings
- Released: June 16, 1998
- Genres: Country; outlaw country
- Length: 53:09
- Label: Ark 21
- Producer: Gregg Brown

Waylon Jennings chronology
Right for the Time (1996)	Closing In on the Fire (1998)	The Millennium Collection: The Best of Waylon Jennings (2000)

Professional ratings
Review scores
Source	Rating
AllMusic	4/5 stars

Closing In on the Fire is the forty-fourth and final studio album released by American country music artist Waylon Jennings in his lifetime, released on Ark 21 Records label on June 16, 1998.

It features contributions from several celebrities associated with both country and rock music. The selections include, among others, Sting's "She's Too Good for Me" and Tony Joe White's title track, creating a greater degree of musical eclecticism than in many previous Jennings releases. The singer incorporated elements of genres such as blues and rock, in addition to traditional country ballads. "Best Friends of Mine," an autobiographical song, is a tribute to Buddy Holly, Hank Williams Jr. and Jim Garchow (former DJ and longtime voice of the Idaho Falls Chukars) minor league baseball team who was one of Jennings' close friends from Waylon's days in Phoenix. Carl Smith, one of Jennings's idols, appears on "Untitled Waltz." In an interview the singer mentioned that he wasn't fully satisfied with his take on The Rolling Stones' "No Expectations", calling it "a little more contrived than I would have liked."

An interview featuring Jennings commenting on the record is included as a bonus track. Closing In on the Fire, Jennings' 72nd release, reached #71 on the country charts and was the last studio album by the singer to be released before his death in 2002.

== Track listing ==
1. "Closing In on the Fire" (Tony Joe White) – 4:41
2. "I Know About Me Don't Know About You" – 3:02
  - With Travis Tritt
3. "Best Friends of Mine" (Jennings) – 3:57
4. "Just Watch Your Mama and Me" (Jennings) – 4:45
  - With Jessi Colter
5. "She's Too Good for Me" (Sting) – 2:30
  - With Sheryl Crow and Mark Knopfler
6. "Back Home (Where I Come From)" (Jennings) – 4:37
7. "Be Mine" (Kimmie Rhodes) – 4:41
8. "Easy Money" – 4:51
9. "The Blues Don't Care" – 6:08
10. "Untitled Waltz" (Kevin Welch) – 3:52
  - With Carl Smith
11. "No Expectations" (Mick Jagger, Keith Richards) – 10:05
12. Interview – 9:25

== Personnel ==
- Sam Bacco - percussion
- Richard Bennett - acoustic guitar, electric guitar
- Pat Buchanan - electric guitar
- Larry Byrom - acoustic guitar, electric guitar
- Jessi Colter - vocals
- Sheryl Crow - vocals
- Michael Henderson - acoustic guitar, electric guitar, mandolin, harmonica
- Jack Holder - electric guitar
- Mark Knopfler - electric guitar
- Bill Livsey - electric guitar, harmonium, accordion, Wurlitzer piano, Clavinet, Hammond B-3 organ
- Greg Morrow - drums
- Michael Rhodes - bass
- Carter Robinson - vocals
- Hargus "Pig" Robbins - piano
- Matt Rollings - piano
- Randy Scruggs - acoustic guitar
- Sting - bass
- Harry Stinson - percussion
- Marty Stuart - electric guitar, mandolin
- George Tidwell - trumpet
- Travis Tritt - vocals
- Robby Turner - steel guitar, resonator guitar
- Steve Turner - drums
- Waylon Jennings - vocals

== Charts ==
Chart performance for Closing In on the Fire
Chart (1998)	Peak position
UK Country Albums (Official Charts)	8
US Top Country Albums (Billboard)	71
