= Rose in Paradise =

Single by Waylon Jennings

from the album Hangin' Tough
- B-side: "Crying Don't Even Come Close"
- Released: January 1987
- Genre: Country
- Length: 3:42
- Label: MCA
- Songwriters: Jim McBride; Stewart Harris
- Producers: Jimmy Bowen; Waylon Jennings

Waylon Jennings singles chronology
"The Broken Promise Land" (1986)	"Rose in Paradise" (1987)	"Fallin' Out" (1987)

"Rose in Paradise" is a song written by Stewart Harris and Jim McBride, and recorded by American country music artist Waylon Jennings. It was released in January 1987 as the first single from the album Hangin' Tough. The song was Jennings' twelfth number one country single. The single went to number one for one week and spent a total of nineteen weeks on the country chart.

== Charts ==
Chart (1987)	Peak position
US Hot Country Songs (Billboard)	1
Canadian RPM Country Tracks	1
