= Right for the Time =

Studio album by Waylon Jennings
- Released: May 21, 1996
- Recorded: January 26–31, 1996
- Genres: Country; outlaw country
- Length: 44:13
- Label: Justice
- Producer: Randall Jamail

Waylon Jennings chronology
The Road Goes on Forever (1995)	Right for the Time (1996)	Closing In on the Fire (1998)

Professional ratings
Review scores
Source	Rating
Allmusic	3/5 stars

Right for the Time is the forty-third studio album by American country music artist Waylon Jennings, released on Justice Records, an independent label, in 1996. Most of the songs on the album, as is the case with several later Jennings releases, were written by the singer himself. Among the other tracks, a cover of Paul Simon's "The Boxer" is notable. The liner notes for the album were written by the record's producer, Randall Jamail. Right for the Time failed to chart. "Deep in the West," a duet with Jessi Colter, was released as a single and a music video was made.

== Track listing ==
All tracks composed by Waylon Jennings; except where indicated

1. "WBPT" – 3:03
2. "Cactus Texas" – 3:08
3. "The Most Sensible Thing" (Jennings, Troy Seals, Bobby Emmons) – 4:05
4. "The Boxer" (Paul Simon) – 3:47
5. "Hittin' the Bottle Again" – 4:21
6. "Wastin' Time" – 2:50
7. "Kissing You Goodbye" – 2:00
8. "Carnival Song" (Jeff Black) – 3:49
9. "Out of Jail" – 3:33
10. "Lines" (Jennings, Kimmie Rhodes) – 3:03
11. "Deep in the West" (Shake Russell) – 3:37
12. "Right for the Time" – 3:54
13. "Living Legends, Pt. II" – 3:03

== Personnel ==
- Jerry Bridges – acoustic bass, 12-string guitar, acoustic guitar, bass guitar
- Jessi Colter – background vocals
- Jesse Dayton – acoustic guitar, electric guitar
- Jeff Hale – drums, tambourine, ocean drum
- Randall Jamail – acoustic guitar
- Waylon Jennings – acoustic guitar, electric guitar, lead vocals, background vocals
- Shawn Jones – 12-string guitar, acoustic guitar, electric guitar, slide guitar
- Fred Lawrence – Hammond organ, acoustic piano, Wurlitzer piano
- Robby Turner – Dobro, lap steel guitar, mandolin, pedal steel guitar

== Charts ==
Chart performance for Right for the Time
Chart (1996)	Peak position
UK Country Albums (Official Charts)	8
