= Jewels (Waylon Jennings album) =

Studio album by Waylon Jennings
- Released: December 1968
- Genre: Country
- Label: RCA Victor
- Producer: Chet Atkins

Waylon Jennings chronology
Only the Greatest (1968)	Jewels (1968)	Just to Satisfy You (1969)

Professional ratings
Review scores
Source	Rating
Allmusic	3/5 stars

Jewels is the tenth studio album by American country music singer and songwriter Waylon Jennings, released in 1968 on RCA Victor.

== Chart performance ==
The album debuted on the Billboard Top Country LP's chart in the issue dated January 4, 1969, peaking at number 6 during a twenty-week run on it.

== Track listing ==
No.	Title	Writer(s)	Length
1.	"New York City, RFD"	Larry Collins, Alice Joy
2.	"Today I Started Loving You Again"	Merle Haggard, Bonnie Owens
3.	"Folsom Prison Blues"	Johnny Cash
4.	"If You Were Mine to Lose"	Mickey Jaco
5.	"See You Around (On Your Way Down)"	Harlan Howard
6.	"Six Strings Away"	Waylon Jennings
7.	"Yours Love"	Harlan Howard
8.	"How Much Rain Can One Man Stand"	Dallas Frazier
9.	"Mental Revenge"	Mel Tillis
10.	"I'm Doing This for You"	Hank Cochran
11.	"You Love the Ground I Walk On"	Harlan Howard, Don McHan
12.	"My Ramona"	Merle Haggard
