= Ol' Waylon =

Studio album by Waylon Jennings
- Released: April 1977
- Genres: Country; outlaw country
- Length: 34:37
- Label: RCA Victor
- Producer: Chips Moman

Waylon Jennings chronology
Waylon Live (1976)	Ol' Waylon (1977)	Waylon & Willie (1978)

Singles from Ol' Waylon
- 1. "Luckenbach, Texas (Back to the Basics of Love)" Released: April 11, 1977

Ol' Waylon is the twenty-fourth studio album by American country music artist Waylon Jennings. It was released on RCA Victor in 1977. It eventually became one of Jennings' highest-selling albums, due in no small part to the phenomenal success of the chart-topping "Luckenbach, Texas (Back to the Basics of Love)." It was also the singer's fourth solo album in a row to reach the top of the country charts, remaining there for thirteen weeks and becoming country music's first platinum album by any single solo artist.

== Background ==
He won the CMA Award for Vocalist of the Year in 1975 and Duo of the Year in 1976 with Nelson for their smash duet "Good Hearted Woman." "People came out to hear our outlaw shows like they were rock concerts," Tompall Glaser recalled in Nelson's 1988 autobiography Willie: An Autobiography. "All at once we were in coliseums and stadiums, we had tractor-trailer trucks and a huge overhead."

== Recording and composition ==
The album's biggest hit – and the biggest hit single of Jennings' career – was "Luckenbach, Texas (Back to the Basics of Love)," written by Moman and keyboardist Bobby Emmons. The song references a couple whose position in "high society" has placed strains on their marriage and finances ("four-car garage and we're still buildin' on"). As Andrew Dansby of Rolling Stone wrote in Jennings' obituary in 2002, "The song was part of a self-referential trinity for Jennings, who was always first to call bullshit when a scene had gotten out of hand. The song condemns 'this successful life we're living' that had Willie, Waylon and the boys living like 'the Hatfields and McCoys.' The spoils of success frequently made Jennings uncomfortable." Luckenbach, a microscopic hamlet 80 miles from Austin, became a metaphor for spiritual renewal, although most people had never heard of it. In his autobiography, Jennings admitted that he hated the song immediately, feeling it was too similar to the laid back "Good Time Charlie's Got the Blues," but also recognized that it was a sure hit. It debuted on April 16, 1977 reaching #1 on the country charts on May 21, 1977 and staying there until June 25, 1977. It also reached #25 on the pop charts, causing Ol' Waylon to skyrocket to the top of the country album charts and hit #15 on Billboard Top LPs and Tapes chart. Willie Nelson, whose own monumental success had begun to eclipse Jennings', makes a cameo on the song near the end. Moman also contributed "Brand New Goodbye Song," which he wrote with Reggie Young.

The album cover features a photo of Jennings on a wall covered by graffiti, including references to Jennings' wife Jessi Colter ("JESSI"), RCA Records ("VICTIM") and ("WHERE IS NIPPER?"), a 1964 Roger Miller song ("MOON is HIGH SO AM I"), Willie Nelson ("WILLIE WAS HERE FIRST!" and "WILLIE WHO?"), Chips Moman ("CHIPS WUZ HEAR"), the Grammy Awards ("My GRAMMY DON'T WORK") and the Country Music Association ("THE CMA IS WATCHING").

== Reception ==
Professional ratings
Review scores
Source	Rating
AllMusic	3.5/5 stars

Ol' Waylon remained at #1 on Billboard's Top Country Albums chart for 13 weeks in 1977 (16 weeks on the Cash Box charts) and was certified Platinum by the RIAA. It also became Jennings' highest-charting album on the Billboard 200, where it peaked at number 15. Stephen Thomas Erlewine of AllMusic writes, "Overall, Ol' Waylon is pretty enjoyable, but it winds up feeling a little hollow, as if Jennings was trying to give the audience what it wanted. There are enough good moments to make it worthwhile, not just to the dedicated but for some casual fans enamored of the outlaw years, but it's still an album that gets by more on its style than substance."

== Track listing ==
1. "Luckenbach, Texas (Back to the Basics of Love)" (Bobby Emmons, Chips Moman) – 3:22
2. "If You See Me Getting Smaller" (Jimmy Webb) – 3:39
3. "Lucille" (Roger Bowling, Hal Bynum) – 4:07
4. "Sweet Caroline" (Neil Diamond) – 3:10
5. "I Think I'm Gonna Kill Myself" (Buddy Knox) – 2:23
6. "Belle of the Ball" (Jennings) – 3:26
7. Medley of Elvis Hits: – 2:37
  "That's All Right Mama" (Arthur Crudup)
  "My Baby Left Me" (Crudup)
8. "Till I Gain Control Again" (Rodney Crowell) – 4:18
9. "Brand New Goodbye Song" (Moman, Reggie Young) – 2:54
10. "Satin Sheets" (Willis Alan Ramsey) – 2:43
11. "This is Getting Funny (But There Ain't Nobody Laughing)" (Michael Smotherman) – 2:48

== Production ==
- Produced By Chips Moman
- Production Assistants: Gretchen Brennison, Jeremy Holiday
- Engineers: Don Cobb, Neil Wilburn
- Mastering: Vic Anesini, Steve Hoffman

== Personnel ==
- Waylon Jennings - guitar, vocals
- Ritchie Albright - drums
- Sherman Hayes - bass guitar
- Johnny Christopher, Gordon Payne, Rance Wasson, Reggie Young - guitar
- Ralph Mooney - steel guitar
- Clifford Robertson - keyboards
- Harrison Calloway Jr., Ronnie Eades, Muscle Shoals Horns, Charles Rose, Harvey Thompson - horns
- Willie Nelson - co-lead vocals on “Luckenbach, Texas (Back to the Basics of Love)”
- Johnny Christopher, Jessi Colter, Gordon Payne, Steve Pippin, Carter Robertson, Toni Wine - backing vocals

== Charts ==
=== Weekly charts ===
Chart (1977)	Peak position
Canadian Albums (RPM)	65
US Billboard 200	15
US Top Country Albums (Billboard)	1

=== Year-end charts ===
Chart (1977)	Position
US Billboard 200	67
US Top Country Albums (Billboard)	1

== Certifications ==
Region	Certification	Certified units/sales
United States (RIAA)	Platinum	1,000,000^{^}
^{^} Shipments figures based on certification alone.
