= Just to Satisfy You (album) =

Studio album by Waylon Jennings
- Released: March 1969
- Studio: RCA Studio A (Nashville, Tennessee)
- Genre: Country
- Length: 31:11
- Label: RCA Victor
- Producer: Chet Atkins

Waylon Jennings chronology
Jewels (1968)	Just to Satisfy You (1969)	Country-Folk (1969)

Just to Satisfy You is the eleventh studio album by American country music artist Waylon Jennings, released in 1969 on RCA Victor.

== Background ==
Just to Satisfy You was Jennings tenth release from RCA Victor with Chet Atkins producing. The album contains the Top 5 hit duet "I Got You," which Jennings recorded with Anita Carter. The title track was written with Don Bowman in 1963. The same year, Jennings signed a recording contract with A&M records but his releases had little success, because the main releases of the label were folk music rather than country. However, the single "Just To Satisfy You" backed with Ian Tyson's "Four Strong Winds" were radio hits in Phoenix, Arizona. Singer Bobby Bare, who liked Jennings' style, covered both songs and recommended Jennings to Atkins, who signed him to RCA Victor in 1965. In a 1967 interview, Jennings remarked that the song was a "pretty good example" of the influence of his work with Buddy Holly and rockabilly music. Despite that the song was included in Jennings performing repertoire, it was not released as a single in 1969. In the authorized documentary Renegade Outlaw Legend, Jennings recalls, "We wrote 'Just to Satisfy You,' and I almost didn't even try to record that, 'cause I didn't think it was any good at all. But that song has really lived down through the ages, you might say." The song has been covered by Glen Campbell and Jennings and Willie Nelson would score a hit with the song as a duet in 1982.

== Reception ==
Professional ratings
Review scores
Source	Rating
Allmusic	4/5 stars

Just to Satisfy You peaked at number 7 on the Billboard Top Country LP's chart. Jim Worbois of AllMusic writes, "The title track on this album is the strongest track here," but declares the LP is "not one of his best."

== Track listing ==
No.	Title	Writer(s)	Length
1.	"Lonely Weekends"	Charlie Rich	2:33
2.	"Sing the Blues to Daddy"	Ray "Slim" Corbin	2:41
3.	"Change My Mind"	Curly Putman	2:30
4.	"Farewell Party"	Lawton Williams	2:54
5.	"Rings of Gold"	Gene Thomas	2:32
6.	"Alone"	Dee Moeller	2:57
7.	"Just to Satisfy You"	Don Bowman, Waylon Jennings	2:17
8.	"I Lost Me"	Helen Carter	2:31
9.	"I've Been Needing Someone Like You"	Ben Peters	2:50
10.	"For the Kids"	Shel Silverstein	2:39
11.	"I Got You"	Ricci Mareno, Gordon Galbraith	2:37
12.	"Straighten My Mind"	Moeller	2:10
