= Are You Ready for the Country =

Studio album by Waylon Jennings
- Released: June 1976
- Recorded: March 22, 1976 – April 21, 1976
- Studio: Sound Labs (Los Angeles)
- Genres: Country; outlaw country; country rock
- Length: 36:06
- Label: RCA Victor
- Producers: Waylon Jennings; Ken Mansfield

Waylon Jennings chronology
Mackintosh & T.J. (1976)	Are You Ready for the Country (1976)	Waylon Live (1976)

Singles from Are You Ready for the Country
- 1. "Can't You See" Released: July 1976; 2. "Are You Ready for the Country" Released: November 20, 1976

Professional ratings
Review scores
Source	Rating
Allmusic	4/5 stars
Rolling Stone	(Not Rated)

Are You Ready for the Country is the twenty-third studio album by American country music artist Waylon Jennings, released on RCA Victor in 1976.

== Critical reception ==
The album was eventually certified gold, with four top ten singles, and topped the Billboard country albums chart. It also hit #34 on the pop charts. Allmusic states that Are You Ready For the Country is "the first time since the late '60s that one of Jennings' albums felt like less than the sum of its parts, and if it didn't necessarily mark the end of the era, it did mark the point when he started to ease back from his startling peak of creativity."

== Track listing ==
No.	Title	Writer(s)	Length
1.	"Are You Ready for the Country"	Neil Young	3:12
2.	"Them Old Love Songs"	Donnie Fritts, Troy Seals	3:13
3.	"So Good Woman"	Waylon Jennings	2:03
4.	"Jack-A-Diamonds"	Daniel Moore	3:27
5.	"Can't You See"	Toy Caldwell	3:46
6.	"MacArthur Park (Revisited)"	Jimmy Webb	6:39
7.	"I'll Go Back to Her"	Jennings	3:10
8.	"A Couple More Years"	Dennis Locorriere, Shel Silverstein	4:11
9.	"Old Friend"	Jennings	3:23
10.	"Precious Memories"	Jennings, Ken Mansfield	3:42

== Personnel ==
- Waylon Jennings - guitar, vocals
- Carter Robertson - backing vocals
- Gordon Payne - backing vocals
- Rance Wasson - backing vocals
- Duke Goff - bass
- Sherman Hayes - bass, backing vocals
- Richie Albright - drums
- Barry Rudolph - engineer
- John Sands - assistant engineer
- Linda Tyler - aslant engineer
- Billy Graham - fiddle
- John Leslie Hug - guitar
- Jim Gordon - horns
- Mack Johnson - horns
- Maurice Spears - horns
- Graham Nash - backing vocals
- Mike Reese - mastering
- Ralph Mooney - pedal steel, dobro
- Barny Robertson - piano, backing vocals, string arrangement
- The Thomas Buffum String Section - strings

== Charts ==
=== Weekly charts ===
Chart (1976)	Peak position
US Billboard 200	34
US Top Country Albums (Billboard)	1

=== Year-end charts ===
Chart (1976)	Position
US Top Country Albums (Billboard)	5
Chart (1977)	Position
US Top Country Albums (Billboard)	12

== Certifications ==
Region	Certification	Certified units/sales
United States (RIAA)	Gold	500,000^{^}
^{^} Shipments figures based on certification alone.
