= I'm a Ramblin' Man =

- Spanish release picture sleeve

Single by Waylon Jennings

from the album The Ramblin' Man
- B-side: "Got a Lot Goin' for Me"
- Released: July 1974
- Recorded: February 8, 1974
- Studio: Glaser Sound (Nashville, Tennessee)
- Genre: Country
- Length: 2:49
- Label: RCA Victor
- Songwriter: Ray Pennington
- Producers: Waylon Jennings, Ray Pennington

Waylon Jennings singles chronology
"This Time" (1974)	"I'm a Ramblin' Man" (1974)	"Rainy Day Woman" (1974)

"I'm a Ramblin' Man" is a song written by Ray Pennington. He recorded the song in 1967 for Capitol Records and took it to number 29 on the country charts.

It was later recorded by American country music artist Waylon Jennings. The song was Jennings' second number one on the country chart and stayed at number one for a single week. "I'm a Ramblin' Man" also appeared on the Australian charts.

The song was featured on the official soundtrack of the 2024 Marvel Cinematic Universe film Deadpool & Wolverine.

== Content ==
The song is a warning to beware ramblers.

== Chart performance ==
=== Ray Pennington ===
Chart (1967)	Peak position
US Hot Country Songs (Billboard)	29

=== Waylon Jennings ===
Chart (1974)	Peak position
US Hot Country Songs (Billboard)	1
US Billboard Hot 100	75
Canadian RPM Country Tracks	2
Canadian RPM Top Singles	78
Australian Kent Music Report	75
