= Rainy Day Woman =

Single by Waylon Jennings

from the album The Ramblin' Man
- B-side: "Let's All Help the Cowboys (Sing the Blues)"
- Released: December 21, 1974
- Recorded: July 15, 1974
- Studio: Glaser Sound (Nashville, Tennessee)
- Genre: Country
- Length: 2:33
- Label: RCA Victor
- Songwriter: Waylon Jennings
- Producers: Waylon Jennings, Tompall Glaser

Waylon Jennings singles chronology
| "I'm a Ramblin' Man" (1974) | "Rainy Day Woman" (1974) | "Dreaming My Dreams with You" (1975) |

"Rainy Day Woman" is a song written and recorded by American country music artist Waylon Jennings. It was released in December 1974 as the second single from the album The Ramblin' Man. The song reached number 2 on the Billboard Hot Country Singles & Tracks chart.

20 years later, the song was covered by Mark Chesnutt as a duet with Jennings on Chesnutt's 1994 album What a Way to Live.

== Charts ==
=== Weekly charts ===
| Chart (1974–1975) | Peak position |
|---|---|
| US Hot Country Songs (Billboard) | 2 |
| Canadian RPM Country Tracks | 18 |

=== Year-end charts ===
| Chart (1975) | Position |
|---|---|
| US Hot Country Songs (Billboard) | 43 |
