= Luckenbach, Texas (Back to the Basics of Love) =

Single by Waylon Jennings

from the album Ol' Waylon
- B-side: "Belle of the Ball"
- Released: April 11, 1977
- Recorded: January 1977
- Genre: Country, outlaw country
- Length: 3:22
- Label: RCA Victor
- Songwriters: Bobby Emmons, Chips Moman
- Producer: Chips Moman

Waylon Jennings singles chronology
"Are You Ready for the Country" (1977)	"Luckenbach, Texas (Back to the Basics of Love)" (1977)	"The Wurlitzer Prize (I Don't Want to Get Over You)" (1977)

"Waylon Jennings – Luckenbach, Texas (Back to the Basics of Love)"

"Luckenbach, Texas (Back to the Basics of Love)" is a song recorded by American country music artist Waylon Jennings. It was released in April 1977 as the first single from the album Ol' Waylon. It was written by Chips Moman and Bobby Emmons.

== Lyrics ==
The song refers to a couple whose position in "high society" has placed strains on their marriage ("this successful life we're livin' got us feudin' like the Hatfields and McCoys") and finances ("four-car garage, and we're still buildin' on"). Jennings suggests that the couple return to "the basics of love" and move to the small town of Luckenbach, Texas.

References in the song include the Hatfields and McCoys, Hank Williams, Mickey Newbury, Jerry Jeff Walker, and "Blue Eyes Crying in the Rain". The final refrain of the song features a guest vocal by Willie Nelson.

== History ==
The song was co-written by Chips Moman and Bobby Emmons who proposed the song to Jennings because his "name's in it." At the time of recording the song, neither the writers nor Jennings had ever been to Luckenbach. In his autobiography, Jennings wrote, "I knew it was a hit song, even though I didn't like it, and still don't." Jennings stated that he disliked the song because it required him to sing his own name in the third-person, and because he felt it was too similar to Danny O'Keefe's "Good Time Charlie's Got the Blues".

== Reception ==
Rolling Stone considered the song to be a "myth-making moment" in the history of outlaw country music.

== Chart performance ==
The song debuted on April 16, 1977, reaching #1 on the country charts on May 21, 1977 and stayed there until June 25, 1977.

=== Weekly charts ===
Chart (1977)	Peak position
US Billboard Hot 100	25
US Adult Contemporary (Billboard)	16
US Hot Country Songs (Billboard)	1
Canadian RPM Country Tracks	1
Canadian RPM Top Singles	46
Canadian RPM Adult Contemporary Tracks	40

=== Year-end charts ===
Chart (1977)	Position
US Hot Country Songs (Billboard)	1

== Cover versions ==
- In 1981, Alvin and the Chipmunks covered the song for their country album Urban Chipmunk.
- Kid Rock and Kenny Chesney covered the song in 2003 for the album I've Always Been Crazy: A Tribute to Waylon Jennings. M.M.

== In popular culture ==
The song has inspired tourists to visit Luckenbach, Texas.
