= Dreaming My Dreams (Waylon Jennings album) =

Studio album by Waylon Jennings
- Released: June 1975
- Recorded: February – July 1974
- Studios: Glaser Sound (Nashville, Tennessee)
- Genre: Outlaw Country
- Length: 31:07
- Label: RCA Victor
- Producers: Waylon Jennings; Jack Clement

Waylon Jennings chronology
The Ramblin' Man (1974)	Dreaming My Dreams (1975)	Wanted! The Outlaws (1976)

Dreaming My Dreams is the twenty-second studio album by American country music artist Waylon Jennings. The album was co-produced with Jack Clement and recorded at Glaser Sound Studios in Nashville, Tennessee, between February and July 1974.

Following the 1972 renewal of his contract with RCA Records, Jennings gained artistic freedom and started to produce his own records - a feat unheard of amongst artists signed to major Nashville record labels at the time. He changed his image to reflect the emerging outlaw movement which himself and other like-minded artists were driving in rebellion against the powerful and controlling Nashville recording establishment. Jennings recorded the critically acclaimed Lonesome, On'ry and Mean and Honky Tonk Heroes, and the commercial success This Time.

Jennings left the recording studios of RCA and moved his operation to the Glaser Sound Studio. After producer Clement married Jennings' sister-in-law and they became acquainted, Jennings was inspired to record an album upon hearing Allen Reynolds singing "Dreaming My Dreams with You" during a demo session hosted by Clement.

Dreaming My Dreams was released in June 1975, and instantly received critical acclaim from publications such as Rolling Stone, with critics praising the choice of songs and Jennings' vocals. It topped the country albums chart and peaked at number forty-nine on the Billboard's Top LPs & Tapes. It was certified gold by the RIAA and Jennings won the Male Vocalist of the Year Country Music Association award.

The singles "Are You Sure Hank Done It This Way" and "Dreaming My Dreams with You" peaked at numbers one and ten respectively on Billboard's Hot Country Songs. "Are You Sure Hank Done It This Way" became an anthem for outlaw country music as well as the wider genre.

Rolling Stone magazine ranked Dreaming My Dreams at No. 2 on its list of the 100 Greatest Country Albums of All Time.

== Background ==
In 1972, Jennings' new manager Neil Reshen renegotiated the artist's contract with RCA Records. Under the new deal, Jennings received complete artistic control over his output. As a leading figure in the emerging outlaw movement, Jennings changed his image. He grew his beard and started to wear jeans, a hat, and leather vests during live performances. Jennings produced his next album, 1973's Lonesome, On'ry and Mean, himself and with the backing of his own band - as opposed to the label's elected band as was the conventional industry-wide practice. The same year he released the critically acclaimed album Honky Tonk Heroes, composed mainly of songs by then unknown songwriter Billy Joe Shaver.

Recording at RCA's Nashville studios with the label's personnel did not please Jennings. During the sessions for the album This Time, he moved his operation to Glaser Sound Studio. RCA initially refused to release the record, citing their agreement with the Engineers Union. The deal established that RCA artists could only record in the company's studio with label engineers. In a September 1973 interview with The Tennessean, Neil Reshen said RCA Records had violated Jennings' contract and talked about the possibility of signing the singer to another label. RCA Nashville director Jerry Bradley and New York-based label executive Mel Ilberman decided to allow Jennings to record at Glaser Sound, and broke RCA's deal with the Engineers Union. Citing Jennings as a precedent, RCA artists requested to be allowed to record in external facilities. Eventually, the label sold its Nashville studios. This Time topped Billboard's Top Country Albums chart.

== Recording and composition ==
Dreaming My Dreams is the only Jennings album produced (in part) by "Cowboy" Jack Clement, an eccentric ex-Marine and former bluegrass sideman who was Sam Phillips right-hand man at Sun Records, producing Johnny Cash and Jerry Lee Lewis. Jennings later declared, "He was a sheer-out genius, all soul. If you got around him at the right moment, he could put the world back on track." As Rich Kienzle observes in the liner notes to the 2001 reissue of the album, Clement and the renegade Jennings were kindred spirits when it came to their outlook on recording:

"In an era when most Nashville producers favored formulas over creativity, Clement viewed the studio as a painter viewed a blank canvas. To him, even the most whimsical or uncommon ideas were worth trying. Like Phillips, he favored an organic approach: recording singer and musicians together, live, in the studio and overdubbing only when necessary. Anything else, he felt, robbed a performance of soul and spontaneity."

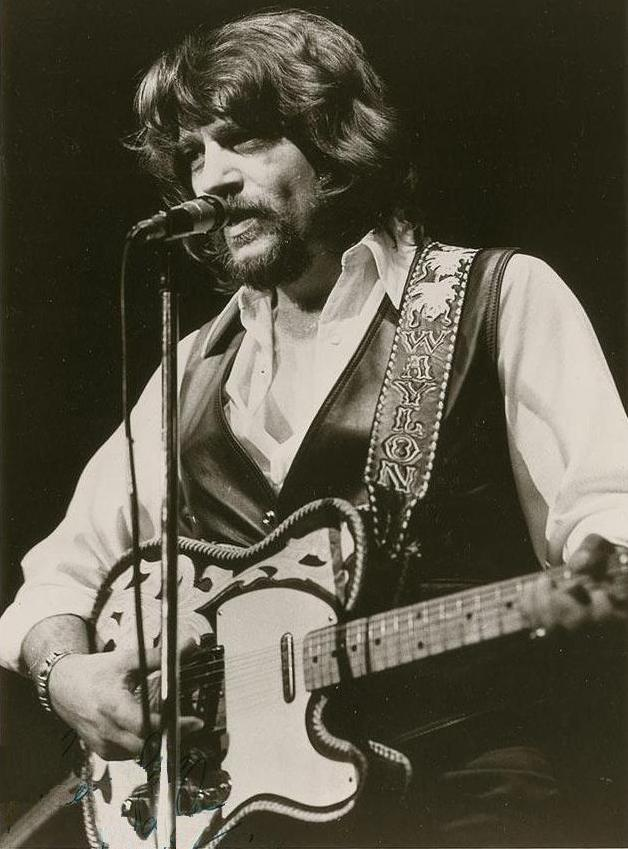
Jennings c. 1973-74

After Jack Clement married Waylon Jennings' sister-in-law, Clement invited him to a Thursday night demo session in his personal studio. Clement's friend, Allen Reynolds, gave Jennings his recently written song "I Recall a Gypsy Woman", and later his co-composition with Bob McDill "Dreaming My Dreams With You". The latter inspired Jennings to record an album. The singer later remembered, "Jack liked to record musicians without earphones, trying to set up an environment that was live without sacrificing acoustics. He wanted everybody to be in the room, to be able to hear and see and interact with each other...He would always try to get as much of it live as he could, though he was riveted on the rhythm section. The main thing was to capture the drums and bass, and even if you got the bass just right, you could work from there." Co-producing with Jack Clement, Jennings was backed by session musicians and his band members; drummer Richie Albright, bassist Duke Goff and steel-guitarist Ralph Mooney. After tracking "I Recall A Gypsy Woman" and "Dreaming My Dreams with You", Jennings recorded the testosterone-driven "Waymore's Blues", a song he wrote with Curtis Buck and inspired by Jimmie Rodgers' songs. The sessions were halted because of miscommunication with Jennings and problems caused by his drug use. While recording "Waymore's Blues", Clement tried to eject Jennings' wife and her sister from the control room. Confused by Clement's gestures, Jennings assumed that the producer was distracted by talking to the women instead of following the session. The singer left the studio for two weeks and was persuaded to return after having dinner with Clement and his wife. When Jennings and Clement returned to redo "Waymore's Blues", they found that they could not reproduce the feel of the original track. They decided to use the original on the album, and this explains the abrupt fade at the end of the song - to cover up Jennings storming out of the studio.

Although Jennings was at the forefront of "progressive" country music during this time, many of the songs on Dreaming My Dreams are rooted in the past, with Jennings celebrating his musical heroes and the cowboy tradition. As music critic Stephen Thomas Erlewine in his review of the LP on AllMusic:

"This is an unabashedly romantic album, not just in its love songs, but in its tributes to Waylon's heroes. 'Are You Sure Hank Done It This Way' opens and 'Bob Wills Is Still the King' closes the album – making Jennings an heir apparent to their legacies. Between those two extremes, Waylon appropriates Jimmie Rodgers ('Waymore's Blues'), covers Roger Miller ('I've Been a Long Time Leaving'), ups the outlaw ante ('Let's All Help the Cowboys'), and writes and records as many sentimental tunes as possible without seeming like a sissy."

Songwriter Billy Ray Reynolds, who had befriended Ernest Tubb's bassist, told Jennings of an expression used by Tubb's band the Texas Troubadours. During breaks from the Midnight Jamboree, moving from Tubb's Record Shop to the air-conditioned bus, the musicians would ask if "Hank done it this way". While driving to the sessions for Dreaming My Dreams, inspired by the line and Hank Williams' influence, Jennings wrote on an envelope the lyrics to "Are You Sure Hank Done It This Way." He recorded the song upon his arrival to the studio. In the book Outlaw: Waylon, Willie, Kris, and the Renegades of Nashville, Clement told author Michael Streissguth, "That was one of the key tracks. We'd worked on it. I played something on it, guitar or something. Then he left, and I started mixing it. And I mixed it in a whole different way. I brought them guitars way up there, and he came in the next day or whenever we got back there and listened to it and loved it." Jennings later said of the song:

With its relentless four-on-the-floor rhythm, phased guitars, and eerie drums, 'Hank' didn't sound like a standard country song. There was no clear-cut verse and chorus, no fiddle middle break, no bridge, nothing but an endless back-and-forth seesaw between two chords. Jack mixed the guitars together so they sounded like one huge instrument, matching their equalization settings so you couldn't tell where one blended into the other. It felt like a different music, and Outlaw was as good a description as any.

Jennings also recorded the Hank Williams song "Let's Turn Back the Years". In his autobiography Jennings recalls, "I felt chills all over me the first time I heard Hank Williams sing 'Lost Highway'. I would stay up late on Saturday night listening for him, happy if I could just hear him speak. I always wanted to be a singer, but he etched it in stone." Clement provided backing vocals to his original composition "Let's All Help the Cowboys (Sing the Blues)" and Autry Inman's "She's Looking Good". The last addition to the LP, "Bob Wills Is Still The King" was recorded live in Austin, Texas, on September 27, 1974. The production of the record lasted six months, between February and July 1974.

"Are You Sure Hank Done It This Way"
The album's hit single topped Billboard's Hot Country Songs

"Are You Sure Hank Done It This Way", backed with "Bob Wills Is Still The King", was released in August 1974, and topped the Hot Country Singles chart, while "Dreaming My Dreams with You", backed with "Waymore's Blues", peaked at number ten on that chart. In his 1996 autobiography, Waylon, Jennings called Dreaming My Dreams his favorite among the albums he recorded. The liner notes, that stated that "the human voice is the only instrument that manages to give a glimpse of [Jennings'] soul", were written by Neil Diamond. The 2001 reissue features the bonus tracks "All Around Cowboy" and Billy Joe Shaver's "Ride Me Down Easy" from the film Mackintosh and T.J. starring Roy Rogers.

== Critical reception ==
Professional ratings
Review scores
Source	Rating
Rolling Stone	Favorable
Billboard	Favorable
Stereo Review	Favorable
The American Home	Favorable
Allmusic	link

Dreaming My Dreams was released in June 1975 to critical acclaim; it topped the Billboard's Top Country albums chart and peaked at number forty-nine on Billboard's Top LPs & Tapes chart. It became Jennings' first album to be certified gold by the RIAA. He was elected Male Vocalist of the Year by the Country Music Association in 1975.

Tony Glover of Rolling Stone described Jennings as "an ultimate performer". Comparing his studio recordings with his live performances, Glover said Jennings' work in the studio "seems to aim more for the midnight mind." Billboard praised Jennings' blend of Country music with other genres. The review said "...the show belongs to Jennings' powerfully distinctive voice and the excellent production of the artist and Jack Clement." It called the recordings a "solid mix of ballad and rockers, some straight country and lots that cannot be classified," and said Jennings is "one of the few artists whose voice is immediately recognizable." Stereo Review praised the album, called Jennings "one of the rare good singers capable of playing his own lead guitar," and called the instrumental breaks "witty and surprising."

The American Home delivered a favorable review, saying the release "features fine interpretive material". Allmusic rated the album five stars out of five, calling it "[Jennings'] best album since Honky Tonk Heroes, and one of the few of his prime outlaw period to deliver from beginning to end". In the liner notes to the 2001 reissue of the LP, country music historian Rich Kienzle calls Jennings' singing on the title track, "a moving performance, brimming with passion and eloquence that in many ways summarized his musical essence."

Dreaming My Dreams is considered one of the greatest country albums ever released.

== Track listing ==
=== Original release ===
Side One
No.	Title	Writer(s)	Length
1.	"Are You Sure Hank Done It This Way"	Waylon Jennings	2:55
2.	"Waymore's Blues"	Curtis Buck, Jennings	2:43
3.	"I Recall a Gypsy Woman"	Bob McDill, Allen Reynolds	2:59
4.	"High Time (You Quit Your Lowdown Ways)"	Billy Ray Reynolds	2:44
5.	"I've Been a Long Time Leaving (But I'll Be a Long Time Gone)"	Roger Miller	2:43

Side Two
No.	Title	Writer(s)	Length
1.	"Let's All Help the Cowboys (Sing the Blues)"	Jack Clement	3:16
2.	"The Door Is Always Open"	Dickey Lee, McDill	2:42
3.	"Let's Turn Back the Years"	Hank Williams	2:30
4.	"She's Looking Good"	Autry Inman	2:33
5.	"Dreaming My Dreams with You"	A. Reynolds	2:28
6.	"Bob Wills Is Still the King (Live)"	Jennings	3:34

=== 2001 reissue ===
Track 1-11 were from the original release
No.	Title	Writer(s)	Length
12.	"All Around Cowboy"	Len Pollard, Jack Routh	2:58
13.	"Ride Me Down Easy"	Billy Joe Shaver	2:41

== Personnel ==
- Waylon Jennings – vocals, lead guitar
- Richie Albright – drums
- Duke Goff – bass guitar
- Ralph Mooney – steel guitar

Overdubbed and session musicians

- Johnny Gimble, Joe P. Allen, James Colvard, Billy Ray Raynolds, Randy Scruggs, Merle Watson, John Wilkin, Larry Whitmore – guitar
- Kenny Malone – drums
- Charles E. Cochran – piano
- Buddy Spicher – fiddle
- Charlie McCoy, Roger Crabtree – harmonica
- Roy Christiansen, Martha McCrory – cello
- Brenton Banks, Carl Gorodetzky, Martin Katahn, Sheldon Kurland, Stephanie Woolf – violin
- George Binkley III – violino
- Marvin Chantry – viola

== Charts ==
=== Weekly charts ===
Chart (1975)	Peak position
US Billboard 200	49
US Top Country Albums (Billboard)	1

=== Year-end charts ===
Chart (1975)	Position
US Top Country Albums (Billboard)	28

=== Singles ===
Song	Chart (1975)	Peak position
"Are You Sure Hank Done It This Way"	Billboard Hot Country Singles	1
"Dreaming My Dreams With You"	Billboard Hot Country Singles	10

== Certifications ==
Region	Certification	Certified units/sales
United States (RIAA)	Gold	500,000^{^}
^{^} Shipments figures based on certification alone.
