= Are You Sure Hank Done It This Way =

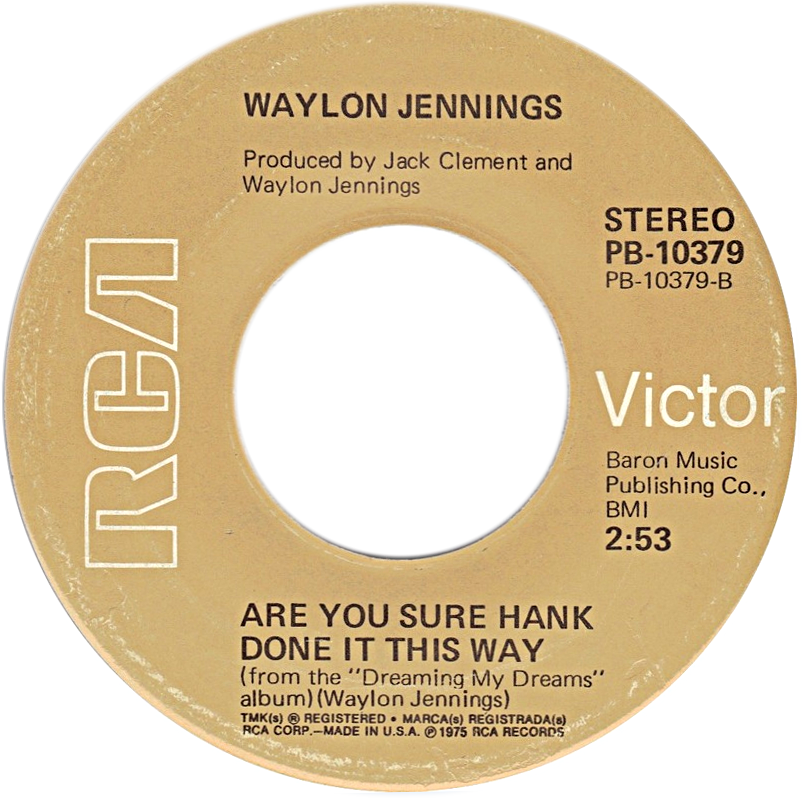

Single by Waylon Jennings

from the album Dreaming My Dreams
- A-side: "Bob Wills Is Still the King"
- Released: August 1975
- Recorded: September 2, 1974
- Genre: Outlaw country
- Length: 2:55
- Label: RCA Victor
- Songwriter: Waylon Jennings
- Producers: Waylon Jennings; Jack Clement

Waylon Jennings singles chronology
"Dreaming My Dreams with You" (1975)	"Are You Sure Hank Done It This Way" (1975)	"Can't You See" (1976)

"Are You Sure Hank Done It This Way" is a song written and recorded by American country music artist Waylon Jennings. It was released in August 1975 as the first single from the album Dreaming My Dreams. An outlaw country anthem, the song was Jennings' third number one on the country chart as a solo artist, spending sixteen weeks on the chart.

The A-side, "Bob Wills is Still the King", is a tribute to the music of Wills.

== Content ==
Jennings, one of the driving forces of outlaw country, released Are You Sure Hank Done It This Way at the height of the movement's success. The song, penned by Jennings on the back of an envelope, captured the singer's frustration with the direction country music had taken over the previous two decades, largely as a result of the control country record labels held over their artists, and the resultant "Nashville sound".

The song pays homage to the influence of country music singer Hank Williams, and criticizes the glitz that had come to characterize top-selling country artists in the 1970s, through references to "rhinestone suits" and "new shiny cars".

Rolling Stone labeled it the "closest things outlaw country has to a mission statement" and ranked it the 34th greatest country song of all time.

== Chart performance ==
=== Waylon Jennings ===
Chart (1975)	Peak position
US Hot Country Songs (Billboard)	1
US Billboard Hot 100	60
Canadian RPM Country Tracks	21

=== Alabama ===
Chart (2011)	Peak position
US Hot Country Songs (Billboard)	53
