= John Anderson discography =

- Studio albums: 22
- Compilation albums: 10
- Singles: 68
- Music videos: 25
- #1 Singles: 5

The discography of American country music singer-songwriter John Anderson consists of 22 studio albums and 68 singles. He recorded for Warner Bros. Records from 1980 to 1986, and again in 2007. Other labels to which he was signed include MCA, Capitol, BNA, Mercury, and Easy Eye Sound. His most commercially successful album, 1992's Seminole Wind, achieved double platinum certification from the Recording Industry Association of America (RIAA). Anderson has charted five number 1 singles on the Hot Country Songs charts, and has had 15 other singles reach Top 10.

== Studio albums ==
=== 1980s ===
Title	Album details	Peak chart positions			Certifications
Title	Album details	US Country	US	CAN Country	Certifications
John Anderson	Release date: July 1, 1980; Label: Warner Bros. Records; Formats: LP, cassette	61	—	—	
John Anderson 2	Release date: April 1981; Label: Warner Bros. Records; Formats: LP, cassette	25	—	—	
I Just Came Home to Count the Memories	Release date: October 14, 1981; Label: Warner Bros. Records; Formats: LP, cassette	40	—	—	
Wild & Blue	Release date: September 15, 1982; Label: Warner Bros. Records; Formats: LP, cassette	3	58	—	RIAA: Gold
All the People are Talkin'	Release date: September 1983; Label: Warner Bros. Records; Formats: LP, cassette	9	163	—	
Eye of a Hurricane	Release date: June 18, 1984; Label: Warner Bros. Records; Formats: LP, cassette	3	—	16	
Tokyo, Oklahoma	Release date: June 3, 1985; Label: Warner Bros. Records; Formats: LP, cassette	24	—	—	
Countrified	Release date: October 6, 1986; Label: Warner Bros. Records; Formats: LP, cassette	17	—	—	
Blue Skies Again	Release date: November 2, 1987; Label: MCA Records; Formats: CD, LP, cassette	41	—	—	
10	Release date: 1988; Label: MCA Records; Formats: CD, LP, cassette	51	—	—	
Too Tough to Tame	Release date: August 8, 1989; Label: Universal/Capitol Records; Formats: CD, LP, cassette	—	—	—	
"—" denotes releases that did not chart

=== 1990s ===
Title	Album details	Peak chart positions			Certifications (sales thresholds)
Title	Album details	US Country	US	CAN Country	Certifications (sales thresholds)
Seminole Wind	Release date: February 10, 1992; Label: BNA Records; Formats: CD, cassette	10	35	11	RIAA: 2× Platinum; MC: Gold
Solid Ground	Release date: June 22, 1993; Label: BNA Records; Formats: CD, cassette	12	75	13	RIAA: Gold
Christmas Time	Release date: August 30, 1994; Label: BNA Records; Formats: CD, cassette	—	—	—	
Country 'Til I Die	Release date: October 11, 1994; Label: BNA Records; Formats: CD, cassette	43	—	—	
Paradise	Release date: January 30, 1996; Label: BNA Records; Formats: CD, cassette	40	—	—	
Takin' the Country Back	Release date: July 29, 1997; Label: PolyGram/Mercury Records; Formats: CD, cassette	19	138	—	
"—" denotes releases that did not chart

=== 2000s–2020s ===
Title	Album details	Peak chart positions	
Title	Album details	US Country	US
Nobody's Got It All	Release date: March 27, 2001; Label: Columbia Records; Formats: CD, cassette	64	—
Easy Money	Release date: May 15, 2007; Label: Warner Bros./Raybaw; Formats: CD, music download	36	170
Bigger Hands	Release date: June 9, 2009; Label: Country Crossing; Formats: CD, music download	53	—
Goldmine	Release date: May 26, 2015; Label: Bayou Boys Music; Formats: CD, music download	36	—
Years	Release date: April 10, 2020; Label: Easy Eye Sound; Formats: LP, CD, music download	—	—
"—" denotes releases that did not chart

== Compilation albums ==
Title	Album details	Peak positions	Certifications (sales thresholds)
Title	Album details	US Country	Certifications (sales thresholds)
Greatest Hits	Release date: 1984; Label: Warner Bros. Records; Formats: CD, LP, cassette	28	RIAA: Gold
Greatest Hits Volume II	Release date: August 21, 1990; Label: Warner Bros. Records; Formats: CD, LP, cassette	—	
You Can't Keep a Good Memory Down	Release date: August 30, 1994; Label: MCA Records; Formats: CD, cassette	—	
Greatest Hits	Release date: October 15, 1996; Label: BNA Records; Formats: CD, cassette	56	
The Encore Collection	Release date: November 18, 1997; Label: BNA Records; Formats: CD, cassette	—	
Super Hits	Release date: March 24, 1998; Label: BNA Records; Formats: CD, cassette	72	
The Essential John Anderson	Release date: June 2, 1998; Label: BNA Records; Formats: CD, cassette	—	
RCA Country Legends	Release date: 2002; Label: BNA Records; Formats: CD	—	
Anthology	Release date: October 22, 2002; Label: Audium/Koch Records; Formats: CD	65	
The Ultimate Hits	Release date: October 19, 2004; Label: Audium/Koch Records; Formats: CD, music download	—	
"—" denotes releases that did not chart

== Singles ==
=== 1970s ===
Year	Single	Peak chart positions		Album
Year	Single	US Country	CAN Country	Album
1975	"Swoop Down Sweet Jesus"	—	—	Non-album single
1976	"What Did I Promise Her Last Night"	—	—	Non-album single
1977	"I've Got a Feelin' (Somebody's Been Stealin')"	62	—	Non-album single
1978	"Whine, Whistle, Whine"	69	—	Non-album single
1978	"The Girl at the End of the Bar"	40	—	John Anderson
1979	"My Pledge of Love"	41	—	Non-album single
1979	"Low Dog Blues"	31	—	John Anderson
1979	"Your Lying Blue Eyes"	15	39	John Anderson
"—" denotes releases that did not chart

=== 1980s ===
Year	Single	Peak chart positions			Certifications (sales thresholds)	Album
Year	Single	US Country	US	CAN Country	Certifications (sales thresholds)	Album
1980	"She Just Started Liking Cheatin' Songs"	13	—	60		John Anderson
1980	"If There Were No Memories"	21	—	—		John Anderson
1980	"1959"	7	—	4		John Anderson
1981	"I'm Just an Old Chunk of Coal (But I'm Gonna Be a Diamond Someday)"	4	—	2		John Anderson 2
1981	"Chicken Truck"	8	—	—		John Anderson 2
1981	"I Just Came Home to Count the Memories"	7	—	5		I Just Came Home to Count the Memories
1982	"Would You Catch a Falling Star"	6	—	15		I Just Came Home to Count the Memories
1982	"Wild and Blue"	1	—	15		Wild & Blue
1983	"Swingin'"	1	43	4	RIAA: Gold	Wild & Blue
1983	"Goin' Down Hill"	5	—	7		Wild & Blue
1983	"Black Sheep"	1	—	1		All the People Are Talkin'
1984	"Let Somebody Else Drive"	10	—	10		All the People Are Talkin'
1984	"I Wish I Could Write You a Song"	14	—	12		Eye of a Hurricane
1984	"She Sure Got Away with My Heart"	3	—	4		Eye of a Hurricane
1984	"Eye of a Hurricane"	20	—	17		Eye of a Hurricane
1985	"It's All Over Now"	15	—	18		Tokyo, Oklahoma
1985	"Tokyo, Oklahoma"	30	—	33		Tokyo, Oklahoma
1985	"Down in Tennessee"	12	—	35		Tokyo, Oklahoma
1986	"You Can't Keep a Good Memory Down"	31	—	48		Non-album single
1986	"Honky Tonk Crowd"	10	—	7		Countrified
1986	"Countrified"	44	—	31		Countrified
1987	"What's So Different About You"	55	—	—		Countrified
1987	"When Your Yellow Brick Road Turns Blue"	48	—	—		Blue Skies Again
1987	"Somewhere Between Ragged and Right" (with Waylon Jennings)	23	—	35		Blue Skies Again
1988	"It's Hard to Keep This Ship Together"	65	—	—		Blue Skies Again
1988	"If It Ain't Broke, Don't Fix It"	35	—	—		10
1988	"Down in the Orange Grove"	68	—	—		10
1989	"Lower on the Hog"	73	—	—		10
1989	"Who's Lovin' My Baby"	66	—	—		Too Tough to Tame
"—" denotes releases that did not chart

=== 1990s ===
Year	Single	Peak chart positions			Album
Year	Single	US Country	US Bubbling	CAN Country	Album
1990	"Tryin' to Make a Livin' on the Road"	—	—	88	Too Tough to Tame
1991	"Who Got Our Love"	67	—	—	Seminole Wind
1991	"Straight Tequila Night"	1	—	1	Seminole Wind
1992	"When It Comes to You"	3	—	2	Seminole Wind
1992	"Seminole Wind"	2	—	1	Seminole Wind
1992	"Let Go of the Stone"	7	—	11	Seminole Wind
1993	"Money in the Bank"	1	—	1	Solid Ground
1993	"I Fell in the Water"	13	—	22	Solid Ground
1993	"I've Got It Made"	3	—	19	Solid Ground
1994	"I Wish I Could Have Been There"	4	—	21	Solid Ground
1994	"Country 'Til I Die"	35	—	31	Country 'Til I Die
1994	"Bend It Until It Breaks"	3	—	28	Country 'Til I Die
1995	"Mississippi Moon"	15	—	11	Country 'Til I Die
1995	"Paradise"	26	—	21	Paradise
1996	"Long Hard Lesson Learned"	51	—	71	Paradise
1996	"My Kind of Crazy"	67	—	—	Paradise
1997	"Somebody Slap Me"	22	15	35	Takin' the Country Back
1997	"Small Town"	44	—	—	Takin' the Country Back
1998	"Takin' the Country Back"	41	—	69	Takin' the Country Back
"—" denotes releases that did not chart

=== 2000s–2020s ===
Year	Single	Peak positions	Album
Year	Single	US Country	Album
2000	"You Ain't Hurt Nothin' Yet"	56	Nobody's Got It All
2000	"Nobody's Got It All"	55	Nobody's Got It All
2001	"The Big Revival"	—	Nobody's Got It All
2001	"It Ain't Easy Being Me"	—	Nobody's Got It All
2006	"If Her Lovin' Don't Kill Me"	59	Easy Money
2007	"A Woman Knows"	—	Easy Money
2009	"Cold Coffee & Hot Beer"	—	Bigger Hands
2009	"Bigger Hands"	—	Bigger Hands
2015	"I Work a Lot Better"	—	Goldmine
2015	"Don't Forget to Thank the Lord"	—	Goldmine
2015	"Magic Mama"	—	Goldmine
2020	"Years"	—	Years
2020	"Tuesday I'll Be Gone" (featuring Blake Shelton)	—	Years
"—" denotes releases that did not chart

== Other singles ==
=== Charted B-sides ===
Year	Single	Peak chart positions		Original A-side
Year	Single	US Country	CAN Country	Original A-side
1981	"I Love You a Thousand Ways"	54	11	"Chicken Truck"

=== Other charted songs ===
Year	Single	Peak positions	Album
Year	Single	US Country	Album
1994	"Christmas Time"	57	Christmas Time

=== Featured singles ===
Year	Single	Artist	Album
1994	"Amazing Grace"	The Maverick Choir	Maverick (soundtrack)
2007	"Get Thee Behind Me Satan"	Billy Joe Shaver	Everybody's Brother
2016	"Trashy Women (20th Anniversary)"	Confederate Railroad (feat. Willie Nelson & Colt Ford)	Lucky to Be Alive

== Music videos ==
Year	Video	Director
1986	"Countrified"	Martin Kahan
1988	"Down in the Orange Grove"	Jim May
1989	"Who's Lovin' My Baby"	Joe Young
1991	"Straight Tequila Night"	Steve Boyle
1992	"When It Comes to You"	Steve Boyle
1992	"Let Go of the Stone"	Michael Salomon
1992	"Seminole Wind"	Jim Shea
1993	"Money in the Bank"	Jim Shea
1993	"I Fell in the Water"	Sherman Halsey
1994	"Amazing Grace" (The Maverick Choir)	Gil Bettman
1994	"I Wish I Could Have Been There"	Jim Shea
1994	"Country 'Til I Die"	Jim Shea
1994	"Christmas Time"	Jim Shea
1995	"Mississippi Moon"	Jim Shea
1996	"Long Hard Lesson Learned"	Jim Shea
1997	"Somebody Slap Me"	Jim Shea
1997	"Small Town"	Jim Shea
1998	"Takin' the Country Back"	Jim Shea
2000	"Nobody's Got It All"	Jim Shea
2007	"A Woman Knows"	Jim Shea
2007	"Get Thee Behind Me Satan" (with Billy Joe Shaver)	The Brads
2013	"Swingin'" (with Colt Ford)	Potsy Ponciroli
2013	"I'll Fly Away" (with Paul Brandt)	Joel Stewart
2020	"Years"	Josh Bishop
2020	"Tuesday I'll Be Gone" (ft. Blake Shelton)	Tim Hardiman
2021	"No Country Music for Old Men" (ft. The Bellamy Brothers)	Derrek Kupish
