= Greatest Hits (1996 John Anderson album) =

1996 compilation album by John Anderson

Greatest hits album by John Anderson
- Released: October 15, 1996
- Genre: Country
- Length: 51:07
- Label: BNA
- Producer: John Anderson, James Stroud

John Anderson chronology
Paradise (1996)	Greatest Hits (1996)	Takin' the Country Back (1997)

Professional ratings
Review scores
Source	Rating
Allmusic	3.5/5 stars

Greatest Hits is a compilation album by American country music artist John Anderson. It is Anderson's second compilation album of that name and third overall. It was released on October 15, 1996 as his last studio album for BNA Records.

The version of "Swingin'" on this release is a remake of the original 1982 hit version.

== Track listing ==
No.	Title	Writer(s)	Length
1.	"Money in the Bank"	Mark D. Sanders, Bob DiPiero, John Jarrard	2:58
2.	"Seminole Wind"	John Anderson	3:58
3.	"Straight Tequila Night"	Debbie Hupp, Kent Robbins	2:55
4.	"I Wish I Could Have Been There"	J. Anderson, Robbins	3:32
5.	"I Fell in the Water"	Jerry Salley, Jeff Stevens	2:40
6.	"I've Got It Made"	Max D. Barnes	2:52
7.	"Keep Your Hands to Yourself"	Dan Baird	3:44
8.	"Mississippi Moon"	Tony Joe White, Carson Whitsett	4:15
9.	"Swingin'(new version)"	J. Anderson, Lionel Delmore	2:59
10.	"When It Comes to You"	Mark Knopfler	3:52
11.	"Long Hard Lesson Learned"	J. Anderson, Donna Anderson, Michael Anderson	3:26
12.	"Let Go of the Stone"	Max D. Barnes, Max T. Barnes	3:20
13.	"Country 'Til I Die"	J. Anderson, Troy Seals, Eddie Setzer	3:02
14.	"Who Got Our Love"	J. Anderson, Delmore	3:18
15.	"Bend It Until It Breaks"	J. Anderson, Delmore	4:05

== Chart performance ==
Chart (1996)	Peak position
U.S. Billboard Top Country Albums	56
