= Greatest Hits (John Anderson album) =

Greatest hits album by John Anderson
- Released: September 1984
- Genre: Country; Traditional country
- Length: 29:25
- Label: Warner Bros. Nashville
- Producer: Frank Jones; John Anderson; Norro Wilson; Lou Bradley

John Anderson chronology
| Eye of a Hurricane (1984) | Greatest Hits (1984) | Tokyo, Oklahoma (1985) |

Professional ratings
Review scores
| Source | Rating |
|---|---|
| Allmusic | 5/5 stars |
| Christgau's Record Guide | A |

Greatest Hits is the first compilation album by American country music singer John Anderson. It was released under Warner Bros. Records in 1984. The album includes singles from Anderson's first albums for Warner Bros., and among its cuts are the number one singles "Swingin'", "Black Sheep" and "Wild and Blue".

== Track listing ==
| No. | Title | Writer(s) | Length |
|---|---|---|---|
| 1. | "Swingin'" | John Anderson, Lionel Delmore | 3:03 |
| 2. | "I Just Came Home to Count the Memories" | Glenn Ray | 3:32 |
| 3. | "She Just Started Liking Cheatin' Songs" | Kent Robbins | 2:20 |
| 4. | "1959" | Gary Gentry | 2:57 |
| 5. | "Chicken Truck" | Anderson, Ervan James Parker, Monroe Fields | 2:43 |
| 6. | "I'm Just an Old Chunk of Coal (But I'm Gonna Be a Diamond Someday)" | Billy Joe Shaver | 3:44 |
| 7. | "Would You Catch a Falling Star" | Bobby Braddock | 2:56 |
| 8. | "Wild and Blue" | John Scott Sherrill | 2:47 |
| 9. | "Your Lying Blue Eyes" | Ken McDuffie | 3:00 |
| 10. | "Black Sheep" | Danny Darst, Robert Altman | 2:56 |

== Chart performance ==
| Chart (1984) | Peak position |
|---|---|
| U.S. Billboard Top Country Albums | 28 |
| U.S. Billboard 200 | 202 |
