= Greatest Hits Volume II (John Anderson album) =

Greatest hits album by John Anderson
- Released: August 21, 1990
- Genre: Country
- Label: Warner Bros. Nashville
- Producer: Various original producers

John Anderson chronology
Too Tough to Tame (1989)	Greatest Hits Volume II (1990)	Seminole Wind (1992)

Greatest Hits Volume II is American country music artist John Anderson's second compilation album. It was released on August 21, 1990, since he left Warner Bros. Records in 1986. before signing with BNA Records in 1991. The album includes ten singles that Anderson released for Warner between 1983 and 1988, starting with "Goin' Down Hill" in 1983 and ending with "Countrified" in 1986.

== Track listing ==
No.	Title	Writer(s)	Length
1.	"She Sure Got Away with My Heart"	Walt Aldridge, Tom Brasfield	2:47
2.	"Down in Tennessee"	Wayland Holyfield	3:23
3.	"It's All Over Now"	Bobby Womack, Shirley Womack	3:21
4.	"Honky Tonk Crowd"	Larry Cordle, Lionel Delmore	3:41
5.	"You Can't Keep a Good Memory Down"	Roger Murrah, Michael Murrah, Bruce Burch	3:13
6.	"Let Somebody Else Drive"	Merle Kilgore, Mack Vickery	2:33
7.	"Goin' Down Hill"	John Anderson, X Lincoln (aka Billy Lee Tubb)	3:34
8.	"I Wish I Could Write You a Song"	Anderson, Delmore	3:09
9.	"Tokyo, Oklahoma"	Vickery	2:43
10.	"Countrified"	Tom Lazaros	3:25
