= Peace in the Valley =

1939 song by Thomas A. Dorsey

"There'll Be Peace in the Valley for Me"

Song by Mahalia Jackson
- Published: January 25, 1939
- Released: 1939
- Genre: Gospel song
- Songwriter: Thomas A. Dorsey

"There'll Be Peace in the Valley for Me", also known informally as "Peace in the Valley" is a 1939 song written by Thomas A. Dorsey, originally for Mahalia Jackson. In 1951, a version of the song by Red Foley and the Sunshine Boys was a hit, and among the first gospel recordings to sell one million copies. Elvis Presley performed the song at the close of his third and final appearance on The Ed Sullivan Show, which reached 54.6 million viewers. The song has become one of the ten best-known gospel standards of all time, and has been performed and recorded by numerous artists.

== Background and composition ==
Blues and gospel composer Thomas A. Dorsey conceived the song during the pre-World War II tensions of the late 1930s while traveling via train through southern Indiana. Upon observing horses, cows, and sheep all grazing together in a small valley, Dorsey questioned why mankind can't live in peace. "The Valley" in this gospel song refers to Heaven. Copyrighted on January 25, 1939, under the title "There'll Be Peace in the Valley for Me", the song often appears informally as "Peace in the Valley". Dorsey intended the song for Mahalia Jackson, with whom he toured off and on through the early 1950s.

"Peace in the Valley"

Single by Red Foley with the Sunshine Boys Quartet
- B-side: "Where Could I Go But To The Lord"
- Written: 1939
- Published: 1939
- Released: 1951
- Studio: Castle Studio, Nashville, Tennessee
- Genre: Gospel song
- Length: 3:10
- Label: Decca
- Songwriter: Thomas A. Dorsey

== Red Foley version ==
The song was a hit in 1951 for Red Foley backed by the Sunshine Boys Quartet, reaching number seven on the Country & Western Best Seller chart. It was among the first gospel recordings to sell one million copies. Foley's version was a 2006 entry into the Library of Congress' National Recording Registry.

== Elvis Presley version ==
Elvis Presley performed the song at the end of his third and final appearance on The Ed Sullivan Show on January 6, 1957, against the advice of the show's producers, who did not want Elvis to sing a gospel song on national television. Presley insisted on singing the song, which was one of his mother's favorites, saying “No, I told my mother that I was going to do ‘Peace in the Valley’ for her, and I'm going to do it,” and Ed Sullivan supported his decision. Introducing the segment, Sullivan noted Presley chose the selection because he felt "keenly" about the recent crisis involving refugees fleeing Hungary after an invasion by the Soviet Union, and that immediate aid was needed to support them.

Presley's performance of the song has been cited as changing the public's perception of Elvis from a rebel to an "all-American" boy. Based on the positive response from the performance, Presley recorded the song at Radio Recorders studio in Hollywood the following week, and RCA Records included it both as the title track of an EP released in January, as well as the singer's first Christmas album released in October of the same year.

== Other recordings ==
The song, now one of the best-known gospel standards of all time, has been performed and recorded by numerous artists:

- In 1950, it was one of the first songs recorded by a young Sam Cooke, during his tenure as lead singer of the Soul Stirrers.
- Jo Stafford, on her 1954 gospel album Garden of Prayer
- Little Richard, on his 1961 Quincy Jones-produced gospel album The King of the Gospel Singers
- Connie Francis, on her 1959 album Country & Western Golden Hits
- Johnny Cash released it as a single in 1962. Cash released the song again in 1969 as part of his live album At San Quentin
- John Anderson, on his 1986 album Countrified.
- Anne Murray, on her 1999 album "What a Wonderful World".
- Tom Brumley, and the Light Crust Doughboys, on the Grammy Award-nominated 2002 album God Is Love: The Gospel Sessions featuring Ann-Margret
- Randy Travis, as part of his 2003 gospel album "Worship & Faith".

== Popular culture ==
Lyndon B. Johnson, before his death, requested that "Peace In The Valley" be sung at his funeral, and Anita Bryant was chosen to perform the song at the ceremony in January 1973.

The song was included in the jukebox musical Million Dollar Quartet which opened on Broadway in New York City in April 2010. The song was sung by Eddie Clendening, portraying Elvis Presley. Additionally, the song was included on the original Broadway cast recording.
