= Countrified =

Countrified may refer to:

- Countrified (Emerson Drive album)
- Countrified (Farmer Boys album)
- Countrified (John Anderson album)
