= Honky Tonk Crowd =

Honky Tonk Crowd may refer to:

- "Honky Tonk Crowd" (John Anderson song)
- "Honky Tonk Crowd" (Marty Stuart song), later recorded by Rick Trevino
