= NFL Country =

Compilation album by Various artists
- Released: November 26, 1996
- Genre: Country
- Label: Castle
- Producer: various

Various artists chronology
NFL Country (1996)	NFL Jams (1996)

NFL Country is a compilation album released by the National Football League that featured country musicians performing songs with NFL stars. The album made it to 66 on the Top Country Albums and was released the same day as NFL Jams, an album with a similar concept but with hip hop music instead.

Among the tracks, "Let Somebody Else Drive" is a re-recording of John Anderson's 1984 single. "You Never Know Just How Good You've Got It", performed here by Glen Campbell, also appeared on Tracy Byrd's 1994 album No Ordinary Man, and "Four Scores and Seven Beers Ago" was previously a single for Ray Benson in 1991.

Stephen Thomas Erlewine of AllMusic says "It's not much more than a novelty item, but as a novelty item, it's pretty entertaining, since the music itself is fairly strong and the athletes do provide a few chuckles."

== Track listing ==
No.	Title	Performer(s)	Writer(s)	Producer(s)	Length
1.	"Born with It"	Steve Azar; Brett Favre	Azar; Kent McNeel; Kim Venable	Azar	3:30
2.	"Two Pairs of Levis and a Pair of Justin Boots"	Toby Keith; Troy Aikman	Red Steagall	Keith	2:33
3.	"Four Scores and Seven Beers Ago"	Doug Supernaw; Herschel Walker	Danny Morrison; Kerry Kurt Phillips; Andy Spooner	Supernaw	3:13
4.	"Too Hip for the Room"	Jamie Warren; Chris Mohr; Steve Tasker	Warren; Jason Barry; Rick Hutt	Warren; Hutt	3:48
5.	"Another Broken Heart"	Lari White; Esera Tuaolo	White; Chuck Cannon	White	3:19
6.	"You Never Know Just How Good You've Got It"	Glen Campbell; Terry Bradshaw	Mark Nesler	Jerry Crutchfield	3:19
7.	"The Boys Are Back in Town"	Neal McCoy; Joe Avezzano	Brian O'Neal	Barry Beckett	2:57
8.	"Let Somebody Else Drive"	John Anderson; Mike Young	Mack Vickery; Merle Kilgore	Anderson	2:46
9.	"The Good Old Dallas Cowboys"	Waylon Jennings; Troy Aikman; Bill Bates; Dale Hellestrae; Mark Tuinei; Avezzano	Jennings	Jennings	3:14
10.	"Boogie Back to Texas"	Asleep at the Wheel; Jason Sehorn	Ray Benson	Benson	3:26

== Chart performance ==
Chart (1996)	Peak position
U.S. Billboard Top Country Albums	66
