= Eye of a Hurricane (song) =

Single by John Anderson

from the album Eye of a Hurricane
- B-side: "Chicken Truck"
- Released: December 8, 1984
- Genre: Country
- Length: 3:24
- Label: Warner Bros. Nashville
- Songwriter(s): Jerry Fuller
- Producer(s): Lou Bradley

John Anderson singles chronology
"She Sure Got Away with My Heart" (1984)	"Eye of a Hurricane" (1984)	"It's All Over Now" (1985)

"Eye of a Hurricane" is a song written by Jerry Fuller, and recorded by American country music artist John Anderson. It was released in December 1984 as the third single and title track from the album Eye of a Hurricane. The song reached number 20 on the Billboard Hot Country Singles & Tracks chart. Its B-side was "Chicken Truck", which was a Top 10 hit for Anderson in 1981.

== Chart performance ==
Chart (1984–1985)	Peak position
US Hot Country Songs (Billboard)	20
Canadian RPM Country Tracks	17
