= Tuesday I'll Be Gone =

Single by John Anderson featuring Blake Shelton

from the album Years
- Released: February 7, 2020
- Genre: Country
- Length: 3:45
- Label: Easy Eye Sound
- Songwriters: John Anderson; Dan Auerbach; David Ferguson
- Producer: David Ferguson

John Anderson singles chronology
"Years" (2020)	"Tuesday I'll Be Gone" (2020)	"I'm Still Hanging On" (2020)

Blake Shelton singles chronology
"Get Ready" (2020)	"Tuesday I'll Be Gone" (2020)	"Happy Anywhere" (2020)

Music video
- "Tuesday I'll Be Gone" on YouTube

"Tuesday I'll Be Gone" is a song by American singer John Anderson for his twenty-second studio album, Years (2020). It features guest vocals from American singer Blake Shelton. Anderson co-wrote the song with Dan Auerbach and David Ferguson, the sole producer. It was released as the album's second single on February 7, 2020, through Auerbach's Easy Eye Sound record label.

== Composition and lyrics ==
Stephen L. Betts from Rolling Stone described "Tuesday I'll Be Gone" as a "plaintive yet forward-looking" country song with lyrics that discuss the uncertainty of life. Taste of Country's Sterling Whitaker called it a musical departure from Anderson's "traditional country" roots, noting that it sounds more like an "early country rock" song suited for the American band Eagles.

== Track listings ==
Digital download/streaming
No.	Title	Length
1.	"Tuesday I'll Be Gone"	3:44

Streaming – Spotify single edition
No.	Title	Length
1.	"Tuesday I'll Be Gone"	3:45
2.	"Years"	2:56

== Release history ==
Release dates and formats for "Tuesday I'll Be Gone"
Region	Date	Format(s)	Label	Ref.
United States	February 7, 2020	Digital download; streaming	Easy Eye Sound	
United States	February 7, 2020	Streaming (Spotify single edition)	Easy Eye Sound	
