= Bend It Until It Breaks =

Single by John Anderson

from the album Country 'til I Die
- B-side: "Keep Your Hands to Yourself"
- Released: November 28, 1994
- Genre: Country
- Length: 4:05
- Label: BNA
- Songwriters: John Anderson; Lionel Delmore
- Producers: John Anderson; James Stroud

John Anderson singles chronology
"Country 'Til I Die" (1994)	"Bend It Until It Breaks" (1994)	"Mississippi Moon" (1995)

"Bend It Until It Breaks" is a song co-written and recorded by American country music artist John Anderson. It was released in November 1994 as the second single from his album Country 'til I Die. The song reached number 3 on the U.S. Billboard Hot Country Singles & Tracks chart and number 28 on the Canadian RPM Country Tracks chart. Anderson wrote the song with Lionel Delmore. It is the last Top 10 hit for Anderson to date.

== Critical reception ==
Deborah Evans Price of Billboard magazine gave the song a positive review, saying that Anderson uses "his own sharp songwriting pen and a fiddle hook reminiscent of 'Seminole Wind.'"

== Chart performance ==
"Bend It Until It Breaks" debuted at number 72 on the U.S. Billboard Hot Country Singles & Tracks for the week of December 10, 1994.

Chart (1994–1995)	Peak position
Canada Country Singles (RPM)	28
US Hot Country Songs (Billboard)	3

=== Year-end charts ===
Chart (1995)	Position
US Country Songs (Billboard)	43
