= Solid Ground (John Anderson album) =

Studio album by John Anderson
- Released: June 22, 1993
- Recorded: 1992–1993
- Studios: Mesa; Sound Stage, Nashville, TN
- Genre: Country
- Length: 31:19
- Label: BNA
- Producers: James Stroud, John Anderson

John Anderson chronology
Seminole Wind (1992)	Solid Ground (1993)	Country 'Til I Die (1994)

Singles from Solid Ground
- 1. "Money in the Bank" Released: April 16, 1993; 2. "I Fell in the Water" Released: August 28, 1993; 3. "I've Got It Made" Released: November 29, 1993; 4. "I Wish I Could Have Been There" Released: April 18, 1994

Professional ratings
Review scores
Source	Rating
AllMusic	4/5 stars

Solid Ground is the thirteenth studio album by American country music artist John Anderson. It was released in 1993 under BNA Records. The album includes the singles "Money in the Bank" (his final Number One hit), I've Got It Made", "I Fell in the Water", and "I Wish I Could Have Been There". Also included is "Bad Love Gone Good", which was written by Dave Robbins, Van Stephenson, and Henry Paul, who comprised the band BlackHawk at the time. They later recorded this song on their 1995 album Strong Enough.

== Track listing ==
No.	Title	Writer(s)	Length
1.	"Money in the Bank"	Mark D. Sanders, Bob DiPiero, John Jarrard	2:58
2.	"I've Got It Made"	Max D. Barnes	2:52
3.	"I Fell in the Water"	Jerry Salley, Jeff Stevens	2:40
4.	"Bad Love Gone Good"	Dave Robbins, Van Stephenson, Henry Paul	3:55
5.	"All Things to All Things"	John Anderson, Fred Carter Jr.	2:53
6.	"Where I Come From"	Kent Robbins	2:41
7.	"I Wish I Could Have Been There"	Anderson, Robbins	3:34
8.	"Nashville Tears"	Bobby Braddock	3:07^{A}
9.	"Can't Get Away from You"	Anderson, Lionel Delmore	3:25
10.	"Solid Ground"	Anderson, Delmore	3:16

^{A}Track omitted from cassette version.

== Personnel ==
- John Anderson - lead vocals, background vocals, electric guitar (track 9)
- Eddie Bayers - drums
- Barry Beckett - Hammond B-3 organ
- Larry Byrom - acoustic guitar
- Buddy Emmons - steel guitar
- Sonny Garrish - steel guitar, Dobro
- Dann Huff - electric guitar
- Gary Prim - piano
- Matt Rollings - piano
- Gary Smith - keyboards
- Joe Spivey - fiddle, mandolin, banjo
- James Stroud - drums (track 9)
- Glenn Worf - bass guitar
- Curtis Wright - background vocals
- Curtis "Mr. Harmony" Young - background vocals

== Chart performance ==
Chart (1993)	Peak position
U.S. Billboard Top Country Albums	12
U.S. Billboard 200	75
Canadian RPM Country Albums	13
