= A Man Called Hoss =

Studio album by Waylon Jennings
- Released: October 19, 1987
- Genres: Country; outlaw country
- Length: 32:29
- Label: MCA
- Producers: Jimmy Bowen; Waylon Jennings

Waylon Jennings chronology
Hangin' Tough (1987)	A Man Called Hoss (1987)	Full Circle (1988)

Singles from A Man Called Hoss
- 1. "My Rough and Rowdy Days" Released: September 12, 1987; 2. "If Ole Hank Could Only See Us Now" Released: January 23, 1988

Professional ratings
Review scores
Source	Rating
AllMusic	3.5/5 stars

A Man Called Hoss is the thirty-sixth studio album by American country music artist Waylon Jennings, released on MCA in 1987.

== Background ==
It is a quasi-autobiographical record which chronicles Jennings' life and experiences in ten "chapters", each of which corresponds to a single track on the album; the titles of these chapters are: "Childhood", "Texas", "First Love", "Lost Love", "Nashville", "Crazies", "Drugs", "Jessi", "Reflections" and "The Beginning". Each song was written in collaboration with Roger Murrah, who is given credit on the album's cover. "Rough and Rowdy Days" was Jennings' second-to-last top ten single, reaching #6 on the country charts. The album itself peaked at #22.

He later recalled, "Somebody talked me into doing a narration between the cuts, and I've regretted that part of the album, though it remains one of my favourite records. If you have to tell somebody the story as you're singing it, you don't have faith in the power of the songs, and the songs didn't need any extra help." Jennings performed the album as a one-man show in California and at Duke University.

== Track listing ==
All tracks written by Waylon Jennings and Roger Murrah.

1. "Prologue" – 3:36
2. Chapter One – Childhood: "Littlefield" – 2:11
3. Chapter Two – Texas: "You'll Never Take Texas Out of Me" – 2:58
4. Chapter Three – First Love: "You Went Out with Rock and Roll" – 2:21
5. Chapter Four – Lost Love: "A Love Song (I Can't Sing Anymore)" – 2:39
6. Chapter Five – Nashville: "If Ole Hank Could Only See Us Now" – 2:53
7. Chapter Six – Crazies: "Rough and Rowdy Days" – 2:35
8. Chapter Seven – Drugs: "I'm Living Proof (There's Life After You)" – 3:17
9. Chapter Eight – Jessi: "You Deserve the Stars in My Crown" – 2:44
10. Chapter Nine – Reflections: "Turn It All Around" – 2:24
11. Chapter Ten – The Beginning: "Where Do We Go from Here" – 4:51

== Personnel ==
- Waylon Jennings - vocals, electric guitar, backing vocals
- Larrie Londin, Eddie Bayers - drums
- Jerry Bridges - bass guitar
- John Jarvis, Matt Rollings, Barry Walsh - piano
- Billy Joe Walker Jr., Gary Scruggs - acoustic guitar
- Reggie Young, Gary Scruggs - electric guitar
- Mike Lawler - synthesizer
- Larrie Londin - percussion
- Ralph Mooney - steel guitar
- Mark O'Connor - fiddle, viola
- Jim Horn, George Tidwell - trumpet
- Quitman Dennis - tenor saxophone
- Jim Horn - baritone and alto saxophone
- Dennis Good - trombone

Technical

- Producer: Jimmy Bowen, Waylon Jennings
- Art direction: Simon Levy
- Cover photography: Matt Barnes

== Chart performance ==
Chart (1987)	Peak position
U.S. Billboard Top Country Albums	22
