= Somebody Slap Me =

Single by John Anderson

from the album Takin' the Country Back
- B-side: "We've Got a Good Thing Goin'"
- Released: July 5, 1997
- Genre: Country
- Length: 3:24
- Label: Mercury
- Songwriter(s): Bob McDill; Roger Murrah
- Producer(s): Keith Stegall

John Anderson singles chronology
"My Kind of Crazy" (1996)	"Somebody Slap Me" (1997)	"Small Town" (1997)

"Somebody Slap Me" is a song recorded by American country music artist John Anderson. It was released in July 1997 as the first single from the album Takin' the Country Back. The song reached #22 on the Billboard Hot Country Single & Tracks chart. The song was written by Bob McDill and Roger Murrah.

== Chart performance ==
Chart (1997)	Peak position
US Bubbling Under Hot 100 Singles (Billboard)	15
US Hot Country Songs (Billboard)	22
Canadian RPM Country Tracks	35
