= Easy Money (album) =

Studio album by John Anderson
- Released: May 15, 2007
- Genre: Country
- Label: Raybaw/Warner Bros. Nashville
- Producer: John Rich

John Anderson chronology
The Ultimate Hits (2004)	Easy Money (2007)	Bigger Hands (2009)

Professional ratings
Review scores
Source	Rating
Allmusic	4.5/5 stars

Easy Money is the nineteenth studio album of country music artist John Anderson. It was released in 2007 under the Warner Bros. Records label, and was his first album for the label since 1986's Countrified. The album produced the singles: "If Her Lovin' Don't Kill Me" (previously a single in 2002 for Aaron Tippin from his album Stars & Stripes) and "A Woman Knows".

Easy Money peaked at 36 for country albums and reached 170 on the United States Billboard 200. Allmusic stated that Anderson pulled the album off "with ease" and that most of the album "feels natural and unforced." The reviewer stated that Anderson "hasn't made a record this good in years...at least [since] the early '90s, possibly the early '80s." The album was produced by John Rich of the duo Big & Rich.

== Track listing ==
1. "Easy Money" (John Anderson, Shannon Lawson, James Otto) - 3:43
2. "A Woman Knows" (Vicky McGehee, John Rich, Julie Roberts) - 3:31
3. "Funky Country" (Anderson, Rich) - 4:00
4. "Bonnie Blue" (Anderson, Troy Coleman) - 6:02
5. "If Her Lovin' Don't Kill Me" (McGehee, Rich, Tim Womack) - 3:03
6. "Something to Drink About" (Anderson, "Wild" Bill Emerson, Jody Emerson) - 3:48
7. "Weeds" (Anderson, Lionel Delmore) - 4:01
8. "You Already Know My Love" (Marcel, Trevor Rosen, Kevin Savigar) - 4:20
9. "Brown Liquor" (Lawson, John Phillips, Rich) - 3:09
10. "I Can't Make Her Cry Anymore" (Anderson, Lawson, Rich) - 4:08
11. "Willie's Guitar" (Phillips, Ray Stephenson) - 3:34

== Personnel ==
- John Anderson - lead vocals
- Brian Barnett - drums
- Dan Dugmore - steel guitar
- Merle Haggard - vocals on "Willie's Guitar"
- Tommy Harden - drums
- Wes Hightower - background vocals
- Mike Johnson - steel guitar
- Troy Lancaster - electric guitar
- Liana Manis - background vocals
- Greg Morrow - drums
- Willie Nelson - vocals on "Willie's Guitar"
- John Rich - background vocals
- Mike Rojas - accordion, Hammond organ, piano
- Joe Spivey - fiddle, mandolin
- Keith Urban - electric guitar, soloist
- John Willis - acoustic guitar
- Glenn Worf - bass guitar

== Chart ==
Chart (2007)	Peak position
U.S. Top Country Albums	36
U.S. Billboard 200	170

=== Singles ===
Year	Song	Chart	Position
2006	"If Her Lovin' Don't Kill Me"	Hot Country Singles	59
2007	"A Woman Knows"	Hot Country Singles	-
