= Somewhere Between Ragged and Right =

Single by John Anderson with Waylon Jennings

from the album Blue Skies Again
- B-side: "Just for You"
- Released: December 5, 1987
- Genre: Country
- Length: 3:20
- Label: MCA
- Songwriters: Waylon Jennings; Roger Murrah
- Producer: Jimmy Bowen

John Anderson singles chronology
"When Your Yellow Brick Road Turns Blue" (1987)	"Somewhere Between Ragged and Right" (1987)	"It's Hard to Keep This Ship Together" (1987)

Waylon Jennings singles chronology
"Rough and Rowdy Days" (1987)	"Somewhere Between Ragged and Right" (1987)	"If Ole Hank Could Only See Us Now" (1988)

"Somewhere Between Ragged and Right" is a song recorded by American country music artists John Anderson and Waylon Jennings. It was released in December 1987, as the first single from Anderson's album Blue Skies Again. The song reached #23 on the Billboard Hot Country Singles & Tracks chart. The song was written by Jennings and Roger Murrah.

== Chart performance ==
Chart (1987–1988)	Peak position
US Hot Country Songs (Billboard)	23
Canadian RPM Country Tracks	35
