= Full Circle (Waylon Jennings album) =

Studio album by Waylon Jennings
- Released: October 1988
- Studio: Groundstar Lab and Sound Stage Studio, Nashville
- Length: 32:30
- Label: MCA
- Producer: Jimmy Bowen; Waylon Jennings

Waylon Jennings chronology
A Man Called Hoss (1987)	Full Circle (1988)	The Eagle (1990)

Singles from Full Circle
- 1. "How Much Is It Worth to Live in L.A." Released: September 24, 1988; 2. "Which Way Do I Go (Now That I'm Gone)" Released: January 7, 1989

Professional ratings
Review scores
Source	Rating
Allmusic	2/5 stars

Full Circle is the thirty-seventh studio album by American country music artist Waylon Jennings, released on MCA Records in 1988. Jennings' fourth and final studio album for MCA before his move to Epic Records, it yielded four minor country hits: "Trouble Man" (#61), "Which Way Do I Go (Now That I'm Gone)" (#28), "How Much Is It Worth to Live in L.A." (#39) and "You Put the Soul in the Song" (#59). Jennings was partly responsible for writing the lyrics to six of the album's ten tracks. Full Circle was a minor success on the charts, peaking at #36.

== Track listing ==
No.	Title	Writer(s)	Length
1.	"Trouble Man"	Tony Joe White, Waylon Jennings	3:18
2.	"Grapes on the Vine"	Steve Gillette, Charles John Quarto	2:59
3.	"Which Way Do I Go (Now That I'm Gone)"	Johnny MacRae, Steve Clark	3:12
4.	"Yoyos, Bozos, Bimbos and Heroes"	Roger Murrah, Jennings	3:09
5.	"It Goes with the Territory"	Phil Barnhart, Ted Hewitt, Barry Walsh	3:47
6.	"How Much Is It Worth to Live in L.A."	Murrah, Jennings	2:56
7.	"Hey Willie"	Murrah, Jennings	2:02
8.	"You Put the Soul in the Song"	Don Goodman, Tim Gaetano, John B. Detterline	3:35
9.	"G.I. Joe"	Troy Seals, Jennings	2:58
10.	"Woman I Hate It"	Rodney Crowell, Jennings	4:34

== Production ==
- Producer: Jimmy Bowen, Waylon Jennings
- Art Direction: Simon Levy
- Cover Photography: Wayne Williams
- Design: Dennas Davis

== Personnel ==
- Waylon Jennings - vocals, electric guitar
- Rick Marotta - drums
- Leland Sklar, David Hungate - bass guitar
- Reggie Young, Dann Huff, Billy Joe Walker Jr., Tony Joe White - electric guitar
- Billy Joe Walker Jr. - acoustic guitar
- John Jarvis - piano
- Steve Schaffer - Synclavier
- Jerry Douglas - dobro
- Mark O'Connor - fiddle
- Tony Joe White - harmonica
- Waylon Jennings, Curtis "Mr. Harmony" Young - harmony vocals

== Chart performance ==
Chart (1988)	Peak position
U.S. Billboard Top Country Albums	37
