= Who Got Our Love =

Single by John Anderson

from the album Seminole Wind
- B-side: "Steamy Windows"
- Released: September 9, 1991
- Recorded: 1991
- Genre: Country
- Length: 3:19
- Label: BNA
- Songwriter(s): John Anderson; Lionel Delmore
- Producer(s): James Stroud

John Anderson singles chronology
"Tryin' to Make a Livin' on the Road" (1990)	"Who Got Our Love" (1991)	"Straight Tequila Night" (1991)

"Who Got Our Love" is a song co-written and recorded by American country music singer John Anderson. It was released in September 1991 as the first single from Anderson's album Seminole Wind. It reached number 67 on the country singles chart in the United States.

== Content ==
The song is a fast-tempo number about a man asking his partner who she's been seeing behind his back.

== Critical reception ==
A review in Billboard called the song "A keening, hard-driving interrogation by one of the great country voices."

== Charts ==
Chart (1991)	Peak position
US Hot Country Songs (Billboard)	67
