= If Ole Hank Could Only See Us Now =

Single by Waylon Jennings

from the album A Man Called Hoss
- B-side: "You Went Out with Rock 'N' Roll"
- Released: January 23, 1988
- Genre: Country
- Length: 2:52
- Label: MCA
- Songwriters: Waylon Jennings, Roger Murrah
- Producers: Jimmy Bowen, Waylon Jennings

Waylon Jennings singles chronology
| "Somewhere Between Ragged and Right" (1987) | "If Ole Hank Could Only See Us Now" (1988) | "High Ridin' Heroes" (1988) |

"If Ole Hank Could Only See Us Now" is a song co-written and recorded by American country music artist Waylon Jennings. It was released in January 1988 as the second single from the album A Man Called Hoss. The song reached number 16 on the Billboard Hot Country Singles & Tracks chart. The song was written by Jennings and Roger Murrah. Jennings would perform the song live in a cameo appearance during episode 2 of Tanner '88.

== Chart performance ==
| Chart (1988) | Peak position |
|---|---|
| US Hot Country Songs (Billboard) | 16 |
| Canadian RPM Country Tracks | 37 |
