= How Much Is It Worth to Live in L.A. =

Single by Waylon Jennings

from the album Full Circle
- B-side: "G.I. Joe"
- Released: September 24, 1988
- Genre: Country
- Length: 2:56
- Label: MCA
- Songwriters: Waylon Jennings, Roger Murrah
- Producers: Jimmy Bowen, Waylon Jennings

Waylon Jennings singles chronology
"High Ridin' Heroes" (1988)	"How Much Is It Worth to Live in L.A." (1988)	"Which Way Do I Go (Now That I'm Gone)" (1989)

"How Much Is It Worth to Live in L.A." is a song co-written and recorded by American country music artist Waylon Jennings. It was released in September 1988 as the first single from the album Full Circle. The song reached #38 on the Billboard Hot Country Singles & Tracks chart. The song was written by Jennings and Roger Murrah.

== Chart performance ==
Chart (1988)	Peak position
US Hot Country Songs (Billboard)	38
