= My Rough and Rowdy Days =

Single by Waylon Jennings

from the album A Man Called Hoss
- B-side: "A Love Song (It Can't Sing Anymore)"
- Released: September 12, 1987
- Genre: Country
- Length: 2:31
- Label: MCA
- Songwriters: Waylon Jennings, Roger Murrah
- Producers: Jimmy Bowen, Waylon Jennings

Waylon Jennings singles chronology
"Fallin' Out" (1987)	"My Rough and Rowdy Days" (1987)	"Somewhere Between Ragged and Right" (1987)

"My Rough and Rowdy Days" is a song recorded by the American country music artist Waylon Jennings. It was released in September 1987 as the first single from the album A Man Called Hoss. The song reached number 6 on the Billboard Hot Country Singles and Tracks chart. It was written by Jennings and Roger Murrah.

== Chart performance ==
Chart (1987–1988)	Peak position
US Hot Country Songs (Billboard)	6
Canadian RPM Country Tracks	18
