= Which Way Do I Go (Now That I'm Gone) =

Single by Waylon Jennings

from the album Full Circle
- B-side: "Hey Willie"
- Released: January 7, 1989
- Genre: Country
- Length: 3:12
- Label: MCA
- Songwriters: Johnny MacRae, Steve Clark
- Producers: Jimmy Bowen, Waylon Jennings

Waylon Jennings singles chronology
"How Much Is It Worth to Live in L.A." (1988)	"Which Way Do I Go (Now That I'm Gone)" (1989)	"Trouble Man" (1989)

"Which Way Do I Go (Now That I'm Gone)" is a song recorded by American country music artist Waylon Jennings. It was released in January 1989 as the second single from the album Full Circle. The song reached #28 on the Billboard Hot Country Singles & Tracks chart. The song was written by Johnny MacRae and Steve Clark.

== Chart performance ==
Chart (1989)	Peak position
US Hot Country Songs (Billboard)	28
