= Mississippi Moon =

Single by John Anderson

from the album Country 'til I Die
- B-side: "It Ain't Pneumonia, It's the Blues"
- Released: April 10, 1995
- Genre: Country
- Length: 4:15
- Label: BNA
- Songwriters: Tony Joe White; Carson Whitsett
- Producers: John Anderson; James Stroud

John Anderson singles chronology
"Bend It Until It Breaks" (1994)	"Mississippi Moon" (1995)	"Paradise" (1996)

"Mississippi Moon" is a song written by Tony Joe White and Carson Whitsett, and recorded by American country music artist John Anderson. It was released in April 1995 as the third and final single from his album Country 'til I Die. The song reached number 15 on the U.S. Billboard Hot Country Singles & Tracks chart and number 11 on the Canadian RPM Country Tracks chart.

The song was covered by Eric Church on the 2022 John Anderson tribute album Something Borrowed, Something New.

== Critical reception ==
Deborah Evans Price, of Billboard magazine gave the song positive review, calling it a "midtempo Dixie meditation" and saying that it does a great job of "showcasing the breathy delivery and vocal swoops that instantly distinguish Anderson from the truckload of country hopefully currently clinging to country radio playlists."

== Music video ==
The music video was directed by Jim Shea and premiered in April 1995.

Natchez native Chris Heard made his debut performance in the video. Many have said his performance inspired Mississippi, his home state.

== Chart performance ==
"Mississippi Moon" debuted at number 65 on the U.S. Billboard Hot Country Singles & Tracks for the week of April 22, 1995.

Chart (1995)	Peak position
Canada Country Singles (RPM)	11
US Hot Country Songs (Billboard)	15
