= Takin' the Country Back =

Studio album by John Anderson
- Released: July 29, 1997
- Genre: Country
- Label: Mercury
- Producer: Keith Stegall

John Anderson chronology
Greatest Hits (1996)	Takin' the Country Back (1997)	The Encore Collection (1997)

Professional ratings
Review scores
Source	Rating
Allmusic	3/5 stars

Takin' the Country Back is the seventeenth studio album by American country music artist John Anderson. It was released on July 29, 1997, as his first album for Mercury Records after leaving BNA Records in 1996. The album produced the singles "Somebody Slap Me", which peaked at 22 on Country charts, "Small Town", which peaked at 44, and the title track, which peaked at 41. Also included on the album is a cover of Van Morrison's 1967 hit "Brown Eyed Girl" from his album Blowin' Your Mind!.

Takin' the Country Back charted at 19 for country albums and reached 138 on the United States Billboard 200. Allmusic stated that it was "one of John Anderson's best latter-day efforts, thanks to his impassioned vocals and the clean, muscular production from Keith Stegall" despite "suffering" from "uneven material".

== Track listing ==
No.	Title	Writer(s)	Length
1.	"Somebody Slap Me"	Bob McDill, Roger Murrah	3:24
2.	"South Moon Under"	John Anderson, George Anderson, Lionel Delmore	3:10
3.	"Sara"	J. Anderson, Dave Colwell	4:55
4.	"Brown Eyed Girl"	Van Morrison	3:46
5.	"Small Town"	Anderson, Gary Scruggs	4:58
6.	"Takin' the Country Back"	Marty Stuart, Curtis Wright	3:30
7.	"Who's Who"	Wesley Dennis, Michael White	3:24
8.	"The Fall"	J. Anderson, Donna Anderson, Michael Anderson	2:38
9.	"I Used To Love Her"	J. Anderson, Kent Robbins	3:15
10.	"Jump On It"	Pamela Terry, Pat Terry	3:55
11.	"ts a Long Way Back"	J. Anderson, Craig Wiseman	3:14

== Personnel ==
- John Anderson - lead vocals
- Eddie Bayers - drums
- Paul Franklin - steel guitar
- Brent Mason - electric guitar
- Hargus "Pig" Robbins - keyboards
- John Wesley Ryles - background vocals
- Joe Spivey - fiddle
- John Willis - acoustic guitar
- Glenn Worf - bass guitar

== Chart performance ==
=== Album ===
Chart (1997)	Peak position
U.S. Billboard Top Country Albums	19
U.S. Billboard 200	138

=== Singles ===
Year	Single	Peak chart positions		
Year	Single	US Country	US	CAN Country
1997	"Somebody Slap Me"	22	115	35
1997	"Small Town"	44	—	—
1998	"Takin' the Country Back"	41	—	69
