= When It Comes to You =

1991 song by Dire Straits

Song by Dire Straits

from the album On Every Street
- Released: 10 September 1991
- Genre: Roots rock, country rock
- Length: 5:01
- Label: Vertigo
- Songwriter: Mark Knopfler
- Producers: Mark Knopfler and Dire Straits

"When It Comes to You"

Single by John Anderson

from the album Seminole Wind
- B-side: "Cold Day in Hell"
- Released: April 13, 1992
- Genre: Country
- Length: 3:52
- Label: BNA
- Songwriter: Mark Knopfler
- Producer: James Stroud

John Anderson singles chronology
"Straight Tequila Night" (1992)	"When It Comes to You" (1992)	"Seminole Wind" (1992)

"When It Comes to You" is a song written by Mark Knopfler and recorded by British rock music band Dire Straits for their 1991 album On Every Street. It was covered by American country music artist John Anderson (with Knopfler on guitar) and released in April 1992 as the third single from his album Seminole Wind. Anderson's version peaked at number 3 on the Billboard Hot Country Singles & Tracks chart in the United States and number 2 on the RPM Country Tracks chart in Canada.

== Content ==
The song is about a faltering marriage told from the point of view of the husband, who feels that his wife gives him a hard time in regards to everything he does and is wishing the relationship ends, rather than continue his feelings of despair.

== Music video ==
The music video of Anderson's version was directed by Steve Boyle.

== Chart positions ==
Chart (1992)	Peak position
Canada Country Singles (RPM)	2
US Hot Country Songs (Billboard)	3

=== Year-end charts ===
Chart (1992)	Position
Canada Country Tracks (RPM)	28
US Country Songs (Billboard)	25
