= Seminole Wind =

Studio album by John Anderson
- Released: February 11, 1992
- Recorded: 1991
- Studios: Masterfonics Studio 6; Javelina (Nashville, Tennessee); Digital Recorders, Nashville, TN
- Genre: Country
- Length: 34:49
- Label: BNA
- Producer: James Stroud

John Anderson chronology
Greatest Hits Vol. 2 (1990)	Seminole Wind (1992)	Solid Ground (1993)

Singles from Seminole Wind
- 1. "Who Got Our Love" Released: September 9, 1991; 2. "Straight Tequila Night" Released: December 2, 1991; 3. "When It Comes to You" Released: April 13, 1992; 4. "Seminole Wind" Released: August 10, 1992; 5. "Let Go of the Stone" Released: November 16, 1992

Professional ratings
Review scores
Source	Rating
AllMusic	4/5 stars

Seminole Wind is the twelfth studio album by American country music artist John Anderson, released on February 11, 1992. This is also known as his comeback album. It features the singles: "Who Got Our Love", "Straight Tequila Night", "Let Go of the Stone", "When It Comes to You", and the title track, all of which (Except for "Who Got Our Love") reached the country top 10, and the second of which was his first number one country hit since "Black Sheep" in 1983. This is also Anderson's highest-certified album, having achieved 2× Platinum certification by the RIAA. This was also Anderson's first album for BNA Records.

"Steamy Windows" was originally recorded by Tina Turner in 1989, and was later recorded by Kenny Chesney on his 1997 album I Will Stand. In addition, "Seminole Wind" was recorded by James Taylor on his 2008 release Covers.

== Track listing ==
No.	Title	Writer(s)	Length
1.	"Who Got Our Love"	John Anderson, Lionel Delmore	3:18
2.	"Straight Tequila Night"	Debbie Hupp, Kent Robbins	2:55
3.	"Last Night I Laid Your Memory to Rest"	Donna K. Anderson, Frankie W. Treat	3:14
4.	"Let Go of the Stone"	Max D. Barnes, Max T. Barnes	3:19
5.	"Look Away"	Bobby Braddock	4:21
6.	"Steamy Windows"	Tony Joe White	3:32
7.	"Hillbilly Hollywood"	Vince Melamed, Jim Photoglo	2:49
8.	"Cold Day in Hell"	Joe Allen, Mike Elliot, Bucky Lindsey	3:03
9.	"When It Comes to You"	Mark Knopfler	3:52
10.	"Seminole Wind"	J. Anderson	3:58

== Personnel ==
- John Anderson – lead vocals, guitar, banjo, harmonica
- Mark Casstevens – acoustic guitar on "Straight Tequila Night"
- Buddy Emmons – steel guitar
- Sonny Garrish – steel guitar and Dobro on "Straight Tequila Night"
- Dann Huff – electric guitar
- Carl Jackson – backing vocals
- Jana King – backing vocals
- Mark Knopfler – electric guitar on "When It Comes to You"
- Gary Lunn – bass guitar on "Straight Tequila Night"
- Milton Sledge – drums
- Gary W. Smith – keyboards, piano, synthesizer
- Joe Spivey – fiddle
- James Stroud – drums on "Straight Tequila Night"
- Billy Joe Walker Jr. – acoustic guitar
- Glenn Worf – bass guitar
- Curtis Young – backing vocals

Production

- Produced by James Stroud
- Recorded & Mixed by Lynn Peterzell, Julian King and John Kunz
- Mastered by Glenn Meadows
- Digital Editing by Milan Bogdan

== Chart performance ==
=== Weekly charts ===
Chart (1992)	Peak position
Canadian RPM Country Albums	11
US Billboard 200	35
US Top Country Albums (Billboard)	10

=== Singles ===
Year	Single	Peak positions	
Year	Single	US Country	CAN Country
1991	"Who Got Our Love"	67	—
1992	"Straight Tequila Night"	1	1
1992	"When It Comes to You"	3	2
1992	"Seminole Wind"	2	1
1993	"Let Go of the Stone"	7	11
"—" denotes releases that did not chart

=== Year-end charts ===
Chart (1992)	Position
US Billboard 200	99
US Top Country Albums (Billboard)	16
Chart (1993)	Position
US Top Country Albums (Billboard)	21
