= Nobody's Got It All =

Studio album by John Anderson
- Released: March 27, 2001
- Genre: Country
- Label: Columbia Nashville
- Producer: Blake Chancey, Paul Worley

John Anderson chronology
The Essential John Anderson (1998)	Nobody's Got It All (2001)	Anthology (2002)

Professional ratings
Review scores
Source	Rating
Allmusic	3/5 stars

Nobody's Got It All is the eighteenth studio album by country music artist John Anderson released under the Columbia Records label on March 27, 2001. The album produced the singles "Nobody's Got It All" which peaked at 55 on the country charts and "You Ain't Hurt Nothin' Yet", which peaked at 56. Also included on the album was a cover of Bruce Springsteen's 1982 song Atlantic City from his album Nebraska.

According to Allmusic, Anderson's vocals are best utilized in the album on "the ballads, which prominently feature steel guitar and fiddle in traditional country style." His voice is described as "vulnerable, slightly wheezy tenor" that is best suited for "slow material." The reviewer states that some of the tracks are "conservative reflections" on life. Anderson's voice is compared by the reviewer to Levon Helm.

The album was produced by Blake Chancey and Paul Worley, who were a popular production team at the end of the 1990s, most notable for their work with the Dixie Chicks.

"It Ain't Easy Being Me" was previously recorded by Chris Knight on his self-titled album. "The Big Revival" was later recorded by Montgomery Gentry on Back When I Knew It All, which was also produced by Chancey. The song was later recorded by Kenny Chesney in 2014 and used as the title track of his album The Big Revival.

== Track listing ==
1. "You Ain't Hurt Nothin' Yet" (Al Anderson, Billy Lawson) - 3:51
2. "It Ain't Easy Being Me" (Chris Knight, Craig Wiseman) - 3:50
3. "I Ain't Afraid of Dying" (John Anderson, Dean Dillon) - 3:32
4. "Nobody's Got It All" (Layng Martine, Jr., Kent Robbins) - 3:44
5. "The Call" (Eric Heatherly, Michael White) - 4:38
6. "Appalachian Blue" (Donna Anderson, Michael Anderson) - 3:43
7. "The Big Revival" (Dennis Linde) - 3:16
8. "Go to Town" (J. Anderson, Dillon) - 4:17
9. "Five Generations of Rock County Wilsons" (John Scott Sherrill) - 3:51
10. "Baby's Gone Home to Mama" (Shawn Camp, Herb McCullough) - 3:20
11. "I Love You Again" (J. Anderson, Wiseman) - 3:51
12. "Atlantic City" (Bruce Springsteen) - 4:47

== Personnel ==
- Al Anderson - acoustic guitar
- John Anderson - lead vocals, background vocals
- Joe Chemay - bass guitar, background vocals
- Chad Cromwell - drums
- Dan Dugmore - steel guitar
- David Grissom - electric guitar
- John Hobbs - keyboards
- Jim Horn - baritone saxophone, horn arrangements
- Liana Manis - background vocals
- Terry McMillan - percussion, harmonica
- Steve Nathan - keyboards
- Steve Patrick - trumpet
- Charles Rose - trombone
- Joe Spivey - banjo, fiddle, mandolin
- Harry Stinson - background vocals
- Harvey Thompson - tenor saxophone
- Paul Worley - acoustic guitar, electric guitar

== Chart performance ==
Chart (2001)	Peak position
U.S. Top Country Albums	64

=== Singles ===
Year	Single	Peak positions
Year	Single	US Country
2000	"You Ain't Hurt Nothin' Yet"	56
2000	"Nobody's Got It All"	55
