= John Anderson 2 =

Studio album by John Anderson
- Released: April 1981
- Studio: Columbia, Nashville, TN
- Genre: Country
- Length: 33:10
- Label: Warner Bros. Nashville
- Producer: Norro Wilson

John Anderson chronology
John Anderson (1980)	John Anderson 2 (1981)	I Just Came Home to Count the Memories (1981)

Singles from John Anderson 2
- 1. "I'm Just an Old Chunk of Coal (But I'm Gonna Be a Diamond Someday)" Released: March 28, 1981; 2. "Chicken Truck" Released: August 1, 1981

Professional ratings
Review scores
Source	Rating
AllMusic	4.5/5 stars
Christgau's Record Guide	A−
The Rolling Stone Album Guide	3/5 stars

John Anderson 2 is the second studio album by American country music artist John Anderson, released in 1981 under Warner Bros. Records. The album includes the singles "I'm Just an Old Chunk of Coal" and "Chicken Truck".

== Track listing ==
No.	Title	Writer(s)	Length
1.	"I'm Just an Old Chunk of Coal (But I'm Gonna Be a Diamond Someday)"	Billy Joe Shaver	3:47
2.	"I Love You a Thousand Ways"	Lefty Frizzell, Jim Beck	3:05
3.	"July the 12th, 1939"	Norro Wilson	3:40
4.	"I've Almost Jack Daniels Drowned"	Ronnie Reynolds, Linda Craig	3:18
5.	"Mountain High, Valley Low"	John Anderson, Lionel Delmore	2:53
6.	"Makin' Love and Makin' Out"	Charlie Craig	2:54
7.	"Motel with No Phone"	Ronal McCown, A.V. Mittlestedt	3:41
8.	"Chicken Truck"	Anderson, Monroe Fields, Ervan James Parker	2:43
9.	"The Same Old Girl"	Ray Kennedy	3:19
10.	"You've Got the Longest Leaving Act in Town"	Dave Kirby, Sonny Throckmorton	3:48

== Personnel ==
- Background Vocals: Ronnie Drake, Beckie Foster, Allen Henson, Joy Gardner, Ima Withers
- Bass guitar: Henry Strzelecki
- Dobro: Pete Drake
- Drums: Jerry Carrigan
- Fiddle: Michael Kott, Buddy Spicher
- Guitar: Harold Bradley, Fred Carter Jr., Jerry Reed, Pete Wade
- Lead Vocals: John Anderson
- Organ: Mike Jordan
- Piano: Mike Jordan, Hargus "Pig" Robbins
- Steel Guitar: Pete Drake
- Upright Bass: Bob Moore

== Chart performance ==
Chart (1981)	Peak position
U.S. Billboard Top Country Albums	25
