= 10 (John Anderson album) =

Studio album by John Anderson
- Released: 1988
- Studio: Sound Stage, Nashville, TN
- Genre: Country
- Label: MCA Nashville
- Producer: Jimmy Bowen, John Anderson

John Anderson chronology
| Blue Skies Again (1987) | 10 (1988) | Too Tough to Tame (1989) |

Singles from 10
- 1. "If It Ain't Broke, Don't Fix It" Released: June 1988; 2. "Down in the Orange Grove" Released: September 1988; 3. "Lower on the Hog" Released: January 1989

Professional ratings
Review scores
| Source | Rating |
|---|---|
| AllMusic | 2/5 stars |
| Christgau's Record Guide | B− |

10 is the tenth studio album by American country music artist John Anderson. It was released in 1988 as his last studio album for MCA Nashville, before leaving for BNA Records in 1992. The album produced the singles: "If It Ain't Broke, Don't Fix It," "Down in the Orange Grove" and "Lower on the Hog".

== Track listing ==
| No. | Title | Writer(s) | Length |
|---|---|---|---|
| 1. | "Down in the Orange Grove" | John Anderson, Lionel Delmore, Herb McCullough | 3:31 |
| 2. | "I Hope Things Aren't Like This Tomorrow" | Anderson, Delmore, | 3:12 |
| 3. | "If It Ain't Broke, Don't Fix It" | Anderson, Tony Stampley, | 2:32 |
| 4. | "Just to Hold a Little Hand" | Anderson, | 3:30 |
| 5. | "The Ballad of Zero and the Tramp" | Anderson, Bernie Taupin | 3:45 |
| 6. | "Lower on the Hog" | Larry Cordle, Delmore, | 2:40 |
| 7. | "Before I Met You" | Anderson, Delmore, | 3:02 |
| 8. | "The Will of God" | Anderson, Delmore, | 2:38 |
| 9. | "Warm Place in the Snow" | Bill Rice, Sharon Vaughn, John Wesley Ryles | 3:35 |
| 10. | "Light at the End of the Tunnel" | Don Cook, Keith Whitley | 2:57 |
| Total length: | | | 31:22 |

== Personnel ==
- Donna Anderson - background vocals
- John Anderson - lead vocals, background vocals
- Buddy Emmons - steel guitar
- John Barlow Jarvis - keyboards
- Mike Jordan - DX-7, synthesizer, organ
- Larrie Londin - drums, percussion
- Michael Rhodes - bass guitar
- Joe Spivey - fiddle
- Billy Joe Walker - acoustic guitar
- Deanna Anderson Walls - background vocals
- Curtis "Mr. Harmony" Young - background vocals
- Reggie Young - electric guitar

== Chart performance ==
=== Album ===
| Chart (1988) | Peak position |
|---|---|
| U.S. Billboard Top Country Albums | 51 |

=== Singles ===
| Year | Single | Peak positions |
| Year | Single | US Country |
|---|---|---|
| 1988 | "If It Ain't Broke, Don't Fix It" | 35 |
| 1988 | "Down in the Orange Grove" | 68 |
| 1989 | "Lower on the Hog" | 73 |
