= Years (John Anderson album) =

Studio album by John Anderson
- Released: April 10, 2020
- Studios: Easy Eye (Nashville, Tennessee)
- Genre: Country
- Length: 31:51
- Label: Easy Eye Sound
- Producers: Dan Auerbach; David R. Ferguson

John Anderson chronology
Goldmine (2015)	Years (2020)

Singles from Years
- 1. "Years" Released: January 17, 2020; 2. "Tuesday I'll Be Gone" Released: February 7, 2020; 3. "I'm Still Hangin' On" Released: March 20, 2020

Years is the twenty-second and final studio album released by American country music artist John Anderson in his lifetime. The album was released on April 10, 2020, via Easy Eye Sound. It is Anderson's first album to be co-produced by Dan Auerbach and David R. Ferguson. The album marked Anderson's return to the studio after a five-year hiatus following 2015's Goldmine.

== Critical reception ==
Professional ratings
Review scores
Source	Rating
Allmusic	4.5/5 stars
American Songwriter	4/5 stars
PopMatters	8/10
Rolling Stone	3.5/5 stars

Years was met with acclaim upon release, praised for its honesty, emotional depth, and Anderson's rejuvenated vocal performance. Many critics viewed it as a comeback that placed the country veteran in the same breath as peers like Glen Campbell and David Bowie, who delivered their most vulnerable and human work in the face of personal challenges.

While some critics noted the album's heavy thematic focus on mortality could feel one-dimensional at times, most acknowledged the raw sincerity and artistry throughout. As Rolling Stone noted, Years was "the type of record that should cast his entire discography in a new light...an inspired offering that shows a forgotten legend pulling off a new trick just as effectively as his old ones."

== Track listing ==
All tracks co-written by John Anderson and Dan Auerbach with additional co-writers listed.

No.	Title	Writer(s)	Length
1.	"I'm Still Hangin' On"	Paul Overstreet	3:45
2.	"Celebrate"		2:55
3.	"Years"	David R. Ferguson; Patrick McLaughlin	2:56
4.	"Tuesday I'll Be Gone" (featuring Blake Shelton)	Ferguson	3:44
5.	"What's a Man Got to Do"	Dee White	3:17
6.	"Wild and Free"	Joseph Allen	2:39
7.	"Slow Down"	Bobby Wood	2:47
8.	"All We're Really Looking For"	Larry Cordle	3:28
9.	"Chasing Down a Dream"	Ferguson	3:24
10.	"You're Nearly Nothing"		3:00
Total length:			31:51

== Personnel ==
- John Anderson – vocals (all tracks)
- Blake Shelton – vocals (track 4)
- Dan Auerbach – producer, mixing, engineer, background vocals (all tracks), electric guitar, percussion (1–9), acoustic guitar (10)
- David R. Ferguson – producer (all tracks)
- Gene Chrisman – drums, percussion (all tracks)
- Stuart Duncan – fiddle (tracks 1, 5, 9)
- Mark Howard – banjo (all tracks)
- Ronnie McCoury – mandolin (tracks 1, 4)
- Russ Pahl – electric guitar, acoustic guitar (all tracks), steel guitar (1, 3–10), lap steel guitar, bass (3), electric sitar (5)
- Dave Roe – bass (all tracks)
- Mike Rojas – Hammond organ, glockenspiel (all tracks), piano (1–3, 5–10), vibraphone (2, 5, 10), Harpsichord (3, 4), bell (3), electric piano, Wurlitzer piano (4), percussion (5, 10)
- Billy Sanford – dobro (tracks 1–5, 7–10), electric guitar (3, 4, 8–10)
- Chris St. Hilaire – percussion (tracks 1, 2, 4, 5, 7, 8, 10)
- Bobby Wood – Wurlitzer piano, electric piano (all tracks)
- Shelton Feazell – background vocals, bass (all tracks)
- Ashley Wilcoxson – background vocals (tracks 1, 4–10)
- Leisa Hans – background vocals (tracks 1, 3–10)
- Terry Eldredge – background vocals (tracks 1, 4, 5, 8)
- Charlie McCoy – harmonica (all tracks)
- Matt Combs – strings (all tracks), violin (10)
- Pat McLaughlin – background vocals (all tracks)
- Roy Agee – trombone (tracks 3, 7, 9, 10)
- Tyler Childers – background vocals (track 6)
- Molly Tuttle – background vocals (track 7)
- M. Allen Parker – engineer, mixing (all tracks)
- Josh Ditty – engineer, additional engineer (all tracks)
- Austin Atwood – engineer, additional engineer (all tracks)
- Trey Keller – engineer, additional engineer (all tracks)
- Alex Skelton – engineer, additional engineer (all tracks)
- Caleb Vanbuskirk – engineer, additional engineer (all tracks)
- Ryan Smith – mastering, engineer (all tracks)
