= She Sure Got Away with My Heart =

Single by John Anderson

from the album Eye of a Hurricane
- B-side: "Lonely Is Another State"
- Released: August 18, 1984
- Genre: Country
- Length: 2:48
- Label: Warner Bros. Nashville
- Songwriter(s): Walt Aldridge; Tom Brasfield
- Producer(s): John Anderson; Lou Bradley

John Anderson singles chronology
"I Wish I Could Write You a Song" (1984)	"She Sure Got Away with My Heart" (1984)	"Eye of a Hurricane" (1984)

"She Sure Got Away with My Heart" is a song written by Walt Aldridge and Tom Brasfield, and recorded by American country music artist John Anderson. It was released in August 1984 as the second single from the album Eye of a Hurricane. The song reached number 3 on the Billboard Hot Country Singles & Tracks chart.

== Chart performance ==
Chart (1984)	Peak position
US Hot Country Songs (Billboard)	3
Canadian RPM Country Tracks	4
