= I Wish I Could Have Been There =

Single by John Anderson

from the album Solid Ground
- B-side: "Solid Ground"
- Released: April 18, 1994
- Genre: Country
- Length: 3:34
- Label: BNA
- Songwriters: John Anderson; Kent Robbins
- Producers: James Stroud; John Anderson

John Anderson singles chronology
"I've Got It Made" (1993)	"I Wish I Could Have Been There" (1994)	"Country 'Til I Die" (1994)

"I Wish I Could Have Been There" is a song co-written and recorded by American country music artist John Anderson. It was released in April 1994 as the fourth and final single from his album Solid Ground. It peaked at number 4 in the United States, and number 21 in Canada. Anderson co-wrote this song with Kent Robbins.

== Content ==
The narrator wishes that he could have been around his family more often for many things.

== Critical reception ==
Deborah Evans Price, of Billboard magazine gave the song a mixed review, saying that while Anderson "squeezes the emotional maximum from this nostalgic ballad with his usual full vocal assault", she compared its theme to the song "Cat's in the Cradle."

== Music video ==
There was a music video for this song. It features Anderson singing in a room at a fireplace, and also shows him on his touring.

== Chart positions ==
"I Wish I Could Have Been There" debuted at number 75 on the U.S. Billboard Hot Country Singles & Tracks for the week of April 23, 1994.

Chart (1994)	Peak position
Canada Country Singles (RPM)	21
US Hot Country Songs (Billboard)	4

=== Year-end charts ===
Chart (1994)	Position
US Country Songs (Billboard)	64
