= Wild & Blue =

Studio album by John Anderson
- Released: September 15, 1982
- Studios: Columbia, Nashville Sound Connection, and Sound Emporium, Nashville, TN
- Genre: Country
- Length: 30:15
- Label: Warner Bros. Nashville
- Producers: John Anderson, Frank Jones

John Anderson chronology
I Just Came Home to Count the Memories (1981)	Wild & Blue (1982)	All the People Are Talkin' (1983)

Singles from Wild & Blue
- 1. "Wild and Blue" Released: September 1982; 2. "Swingin'" Released: January 10, 1983; 3. "Goin' Down Hill" Released: June 25, 1983

Professional ratings
Review scores
Source	Rating
AllMusic	4/5 stars
Christgau's Record Guide	B+

Wild & Blue is the fourth studio album by American country music artist John Anderson. It was released in September 1982 under Warner Bros. Records. It includes the Number One country hits "Swingin'" and "Wild and Blue".

This LP reached third place on Billboard's Country Albums chart (underneath Alabama and Willie Nelson & Merle Haggard) and was certified Gold.

== Track listing ==
No.	Title	Writer(s)	Length
1.	"Wild and Blue"	John Scott Sherrill	2:53
2.	"The Waltz You Saved for Me" (duet with Emmylou Harris)	Emil Flindt, Gus Kahn, Wayne King	2:45
3.	"Honky Tonk Hearts"	Bob McDill	3:13
4.	"Long Black Veil"	Danny Dill, Marijohn Wilkin	3:18
5.	"She Never Looked That Good When She Was Mine"	Johnny MacRae, Bob Morrison	2:34
6.	"Disappearing Farmer"	James Cowan, Sandy Pinkard	3:03
7.	"Honky Tonk Saturday Night"	Sanger D. Shafer	2:53
8.	"Goin' Down Hill"	John Anderson, X Lincoln (aka Billy Lee Tubb)	3:37
9.	"The Price of a Thin Silver Dime"	Ronal McCown	3:43
10.	"Swingin'"	Anderson, Lionel Delmore	3:04
11.	"If a Broken Heart Could Kill"	Allen Henson, Wayland Holyfield, Norro Wilson	3:03

== Personnel ==
- John Anderson - lead vocals
- Steve Gibson - electric guitar, acoustic guitar
- Fred Carter Jr. - acoustic guitar, electric guitar
- Beckie Foster - background vocals
- Joy Gardner - background vocals
- Dennis Good - trombone
- Lloyd Green - dobro, steel guitar
- Merle Haggard - vocals on "Long Black Veil"
- Emmylou Harris - vocals on "The Waltz You Saved for Me"
- Allen Henson - background vocals
- Mike Jordon - organ
- Larrie Londin - drums
- Cam Mullins - string arrangements
- The Nashville String Machine - strings
- Billy Puett - tenor saxophone
- Hargus "Pig" Robbins - piano
- Don Sheffield - trumpet
- Buddy Spicher - fiddle
- Henry Strzelecki - bass guitar
- Pete Wade - electric guitar
- Bobby Thompson - banjo

== Chart performance ==
Chart (1982)	Peak position
U.S. Billboard Top Country Albums	3
U.S. Billboard 200	58
