= Tokyo, Oklahoma =

Studio album by John Anderson
- Released: June 3, 1985
- Studio: The Music Mill, Nashville Sound Connection, and Sound Stage Studios, Nashville, TN
- Genre: Country
- Length: 32:59
- Label: Warner Bros. Nashville
- Producer: Jim Ed Norman, Lou Bradley, John Anderson

John Anderson chronology
Greatest Hits (1984)	Tokyo, Oklahoma (1985)	Countrified (1986)

Singles from Tokyo, Oklahoma
- 1. "It's All Over Now" Released: April 1985; 2. "Tokyo, Oklahoma" Released: August 1985; 3. "Down in Tennessee" Released: November 4, 1985

Professional ratings
Review scores
Source	Rating
AllMusic	3/5 stars
Christgau's Record Guide	A−

Tokyo, Oklahoma is the seventh studio album by American country music artist John Anderson, it was released in June 1985. It was re-released on November 12, 2007.

== Track listing ==
No.	Title	Writer(s)	Length
1.	"It's All Over Now"	Bobby Womack, Shirley Womack	3:21
2.	"I've Got Me a Woman"	Paul Kennerley	3:23
3.	"Down in Tennessee"	Wayland Holyfield	3:23
4.	"Tokyo, Oklahoma"	Mack Vickery	2:43
5.	"A Little Rock 'n' Roll (And Some Country Blues)"	Mike Reid, Troy Seals	3:25
6.	"Till I Get Used to the Pain"	Todd Cerney, Kent Robbins	3:52
7.	"Twelve Bar Blues"	Mac McAnally	3:10
8.	"Even a Fool Would Let Go"	Kerry Chater, Tom Snow	3:31
9.	"Willie's Gone"	Bill Emerson	2:35
10.	"Only Your Love"	John Anderson, Fred Carter Jr.	3:36

== Personnel ==
- Donna Anderson - backing vocals
- Eddie Bayers - drums
- Barry Beckett - keyboards
- Clyde Brooks - drums
- Dennis Burnside - keyboards
- Larry Byrom - guitar
- Fred Carter Jr. - guitar
- Buddy Emmons - steel guitar
- Larry Emmons - bass
- Steve Gibson - guitar
- John Barlow Jarvis - keyboards
- Mike Jordan - keyboards
- Jerry Kroon - drums
- Josh Leo - guitar
- X Lincoln - bass
- Tom Morley - fiddle, mandolin
- Nashville String Machine - strings
- Vern Pilder - guitar
- Bill Puett - saxophone, recorder
- Buck Reid - steel guitar
- Michael Rhodes - bass
- Diane Tidwell - backing vocals
- Bergen White - backing vocals
- Hershel Wiginton - backing vocals
- Jim Wolfe - drums
- Paul Worley - guitar
- John Anderson - vocals, guitar, harmonica

== Chart performance ==
=== Album ===
Chart (1985)	Peak position
U.S. Billboard Top Country Albums	24

=== Singles ===
Year	Single	Peak positions	
Year	Single	US Country	CAN Country
1985	"It's All Over Now"	15	18
1985	"Tokyo, Oklahoma"	30	33
1985	"Down in Tennessee"	12	35
