= I Just Came Home to Count the Memories (song) =

Single by John Anderson

from the album I Just Came Home to Count the Memories
- B-side: "Girl, for You"
- Released: November 21, 1981
- Genre: Country
- Length: 3:29
- Label: Warner Bros. Nashville
- Songwriter(s): Glenn Ray
- Producer(s): Frank Jones; John Anderson

John Anderson singles chronology
"Chicken Truck" (1981)	"I Just Came Home to Count the Memories" (1981)	"Would You Catch a Falling Star" (1982)

"I Just Came Home to Count the Memories" is a country music song written by Glenn Ray.

Three versions of the song have charted. The first, released in 1975 by Bobby Wright on ABC Records. Cal Smith's version from 1977, reached number 15 on the same chart. John Anderson had the highest-charting rendition, releasing his version in late 1981 and taking it to number 7 on the country charts in early 1982. The song was covered by Gillian Welch and David Rawlings on the 2022 John Anderson tribute album Something Borrowed, Something New.

== Chart performance ==
=== Bobby Wright ===
Chart (1975)	Peak position
US Hot Country Songs (Billboard)	75

=== Cal Smith ===
Chart (1977)	Peak position
US Hot Country Songs (Billboard)	15
Canadian RPM Country Tracks	10

=== John Anderson ===
Chart (1981–1982)	Peak position
US Hot Country Songs (Billboard)	7
Canadian RPM Country Tracks	5
