= Your Lying Blue Eyes =

Single by John Anderson

from the album John Anderson
- B-side: "Mountain High, Valley Low"
- Released: October 27, 1979
- Genre: Country
- Length: 3:03
- Label: Warner Bros. Nashville
- Songwriter(s): Ken McDuffie
- Producer(s): Norro Wilson

John Anderson singles chronology
"Low Dog Blues" (1979)	"Your Lying Blue Eyes" (1979)	"She Just Started Liking Cheatin' Songs" (1980)

"Your Lying Blue Eyes" is a song written by Ken McDuffie, and recorded by American country music artist John Anderson. It was released in October 1979 as the third single from the album John Anderson. The song reached #15 on the Billboard Hot Country Singles & Tracks chart.

George Jones also recorded the song on his 1984 album You've Still Got a Place in My Heart.

== Chart performance ==
Chart (1979–1980)	Peak position
US Hot Country Songs (Billboard)	15
Canadian RPM Country Tracks	39
