= Goin' Down Hill =

Single by John Anderson

from the album Wild & Blue
- B-side: "If a Broken Heart Could Kill"
- Released: June 25, 1983
- Genre: Country
- Length: 3:34
- Label: Warner Bros. Nashville
- Songwriters: John Anderson; X. Lincoln
- Producers: Frank Jones; John Anderson

John Anderson singles chronology
"Swingin'" (1983)	"Goin' Down Hill" (1983)	"Black Sheep" (1983)

"Goin' Down Hill" is a song co-written and recorded by American country music artist John Anderson. It was released in June 1983 as the third single from the album Wild & Blue. The song reached number 5 on the Billboard Hot Country Singles & Tracks chart. Anderson wrote the song with X. Lincoln (a.k.a. Billy Lee Tubb).

== Chart performance ==
Chart (1983)	Peak position
US Hot Country Songs (Billboard)	5
Canadian RPM Country Tracks	7
