= I've Got It Made =

Single by John Anderson

from the album Solid Ground
- B-side: "Can't Get Away from You"
- Released: November 29, 1993
- Genre: Country
- Length: 2:52
- Label: BNA
- Songwriter: Max D. Barnes
- Producers: John Anderson; James Stroud

John Anderson singles chronology
"I Fell in the Water" (1993)	"I've Got It Made" (1993)	"I Wish I Could Have Been There" (1994)

"I've Got It Made" is a song written by Max D. Barnes, and recorded by American country music artist John Anderson. It was released in November 1993 as the third single from his album Solid Ground. The song reached number 3 on the Billboard Hot Country Singles & Tracks chart and number 19 on the Canadian RPM Country Tracks chart.

In August 2020, Josh Turner recorded a cover version of "I've Got It Made" featuring Anderson on duet vocals on his album, Country State of Mind.

== Chart performance ==
Chart (1993–1994)	Peak position
Canada Country Singles (RPM)	19
US Hot Country Songs (Billboard)	3

=== Year-end charts ===
Chart (1994)	Position
US Country Songs (Billboard)	25
