= Bigger Hands =

Studio album by John Anderson
- Released: June 9, 2009
- Genre: Country
- Label: Country Crossing
- Producer: John Anderson; James Stroud

John Anderson chronology
Easy Money (2007)	Bigger Hands (2009)	Goldmine (2015)

Professional ratings
Review scores
Source	Rating
Allmusic	4/5 stars
PopMatters	5/10 stars

Bigger Hands is the twentieth studio album of country music artist John Anderson. It was released in 2009 under the Country Crossing label. The album produced the single "Cold Coffee and Hot Beer." Anderson co-produced the album and co-wrote all of the tracks, and includes his version of "Shuttin' Detroit Down," a protest song he wrote with John Rich, who included it on his 2009 album Son of a Preacher Man from which it was released as a single. Also included is the song "How Can I Be So Thirsty," which was also recorded by co-writer Jerrod Niemann on his 2010 album Judge Jerrod & the Hung Jury.

== Content ==
Anderson remarked that he did not make the decision to release "Cold Coffee and Hot Beer" as the lead single, but instead it was "selected by committee." He stated that he believed there are "four or five good singles on the record."

== Track listing ==
1. "How Can I Be So Thirsty" (John Anderson, Jerrod Niemann, Billy Joe Walker, Jr.) - 2:33
2. "Better News" (J. Anderson, Dean Dillon) - 3:17
3. "Hawaia in Hawaii" (J. Anderson, Shawn Camp) - 3:46
4. "The Greatest Story Never Told" (J. Anderson, Mike Anderson, Donna Anderson) - 3:19
5. "Shuttin' Detroit Down" (J. Anderson, John Rich) - 4:15
6. "Cold Coffee and Hot Beer" (J. Anderson, Lionel Delmore) - 3:09
7. "Bar Room Country" (J. Anderson, Milton Sledge, Stan Webb) - 3:22
8. "Missing Her Again" (J. Anderson, Dean Dillon) - 3:20
9. "Shorty's Long Gone" (J. Anderson, Mark Farner) - 4:08
10. "What Used to Turn Me On" (J. Anderson, "Wild" Bill Emerson, Jody Emerson) - 3:12
11. "Fade Out" (J. Anderson, Shawn Camp) - 3:27
12. "Bigger Hands" (J. Anderson, James Ervan Parker) - 4:28

== Personnel ==
- John Anderson – acoustic guitar, lead vocals
- Eddie Bayers – drums
- Mike Brignardello – bass guitar
- Paul Franklin – Dobro, steel guitar
- Wes Hightower – background vocals
- Chip Martin – acoustic guitar
- Brent Mason – electric guitar
- Steve Nathan – keyboards, piano
- Larry Paxton – bass guitar
- Scotty Sanders – Dobro, steel guitar
- Joe Spivey – fiddle, mandolin
- Biff Watson – acoustic guitar

== Chart performance ==
Chart (2009)	Peak position
U.S. Billboard Top Country Albums	53
