= Honky Tonk Crowd (John Anderson song) =

Single by John Anderson

from the album Countrified
- B-side: "If I Could Have My Way"
- Released: August 4, 1986
- Genre: Country
- Length: 3:42
- Label: Warner Bros. Nashville
- Songwriter(s): Larry Cordle; Lionel Delmore
- Producer(s): John Anderson; Jim Ed Norman

John Anderson singles chronology
"You Can't Keep a Good Memory Down" (1986)	"Honky Tonk Crowd" (1986)	"Countrified" (1987)

"Honky Tonk Crowd" is a song written by Larry Cordle and Lionel Delmore, and recorded by American country music artist John Anderson. It was released in August 1986 as the first single from the album Countrified. The song reached number 10 on the Billboard Hot Country Singles & Tracks chart. It was his last Top 10 hit on that chart until "Straight Tequila Night" in late 1991-early 1992.

== Chart performance ==
"Honky Tonk Crowd" debuted at number 65 on the U.S. Billboard Hot Country Singles & Tracks for the week of August 16, 1986.

Chart (1986)	Peak position
US Hot Country Songs (Billboard)	10
Canadian RPM Country Tracks	7
