= Let Somebody Else Drive =

Single by John Anderson

from the album All the People Are Talkin'
- B-side: "Old Mexico"
- Released: January 14, 1984
- Genre: Country
- Length: 2:38
- Label: Warner Bros. Nashville
- Songwriters: Merle Kilgore; Mack Vickery
- Producers: John Anderson; Lou Bradley

John Anderson singles chronology
"Black Sheep" (1983)	"Let Somebody Else Drive" (1984)	"I Wish I Could Write You a Song" (1984)

"Let Somebody Else Drive" is a song written by Merle Kilgore and Mack Vickery, and recorded by American country music artist John Anderson. It was released in January 1984 as the second single from the album All the People Are Talkin'. The song reached number 10 on the Billboard Hot Country Singles nd Tracks chart.

== Success ==
The song's success led to Anderson promoting public awareness of drinking and driving through the Florida State Highway Safety Department.

Anderson re-recorded the song for the 1996 compilation NFL Country, a multiple-artist compilation album pairing country artists with players in the National Football League. This rendition featured guest vocals from Mike Young.

== Content ==
The song is about the dangers of drinking and driving, warning those who drink to "let somebody else drive".

== Other versions ==
The song was recorded by John Rich featuring Hank Williams Jr. on Rich's 2010 extended play album Rich Rocks.

== Chart performance ==
Chart (1984)	Peak position
US Hot Country Songs (Billboard)	10
Canadian RPM Country Tracks	10
