= All the People Are Talkin' =

Studio album by John Anderson
- Released: September 1983
- Studios: The Music Mill, Nashville, TN
- Genre: Country
- Length: 29:16
- Label: Warner Bros. Nashville
- Producer: Lou Bradley

John Anderson chronology
Wild & Blue (1982)	All the People Are Talkin' (1983)	Eye of a Hurricane (1984)

Singles from All the People Are Talkin'
- 1. "Black Sheep" Released: September 1983; 2. "Let Somebody Else Drive" Released: January 14, 1984

Professional ratings
Review scores
Source	Rating
AllMusic	4/5 stars
American Songwriter	3.5/5 stars
Christgau's Record Guide	A−
The Encyclopedia of Popular Music	3/5 stars
The Rolling Stone Album Guide	3/5 stars

All The People Are Talkin' is the fifth studio album by American country music artist John Anderson. It was released in 1983 under Warner Bros. Records. Singles from it include the Number One country hit "Black Sheep" and "Let Somebody Else Drive".

== Critical reception ==
PopMatters called the songs "upbeat, bluesy pop-rock numbers that still sound thoroughly country in Anderson's hands." Chuck Eddy, in The Village Voice, called All the People Are Talkin' "raucous" and Anderson's "only real hair-up-the-butt rock'n'roll album."

== Track listing ==
No.	Title	Writer(s)	Length
1.	"All the People Are Talkin'"	Fred Carter Jr.	2:41
2.	"Blue Lights and Bubbles"	Ken McDuffie	2:41
3.	"Haunted House"	Bob Geddins	3:13
4.	"Look What Followed Me Home"	Becky Hobbs, Mark Sherrill	3:19
5.	"Black Sheep"	Robert Altman, Daniel Darst	2:59
6.	"Let Somebody Else Drive"	Merle Kilgore, Mack Vickery	2:38
7.	"An Occasional Eagle"	Carter	3:47
8.	"Things Ain't Been the Same Around the Farm"	John Anderson, "Wild" Bill Emerson	2:23
9.	"Call on Me"	Anderson	2:38
10.	"Old Mexico"	Anderson, Lionel Delmore, Larry Emmons	2:57

== Personnel ==
- Donna Kay Anderson - background vocals
- John Anderson - electric guitar, lead vocals, background vocals
- Larry Emmons - bass guitar
- Mike Jordon - organ, piano
- X. Lincoln - tic-tac bass
- Tom Morley - fiddle, mandolin
- Vernon Pilder - acoustic guitar, electric guitar
- Bill Puett - saxophone, flute
- Buck Reid - steel guitar
- Deanna Anderson Walls - background vocals
- James Wolfe - drums

== Charts ==
=== Weekly charts ===
Chart (1983)	Peak position
US Billboard 200	163
US Top Country Albums (Billboard)	9

=== Year-end charts ===
Chart (1984)	Position
US Top Country Albums (Billboard)	31
