= Eye of a Hurricane (John Anderson album) =

Studio album by John Anderson
- Released: June 18, 1984
- Studio: The Music Mill, Nashville Sound Connection, and Sound Stage, Nashville, TN
- Genre: Country
- Length: 31:14
- Label: Warner Bros. Nashville
- Producer: Lou Bradley

John Anderson chronology
All the People are Talkin' (1983)	Eye of a Hurricane (1984)	Greatest Hits (1984)

Singles from Eye of a Hurricane
- 1. "I Wish I Could Write You a Song" Released: May 1984; 2. "She Sure Got Away with My Heart" Released: August 18, 1984; 3. "Eye of a Hurricane" Released: December 8, 1984

Professional ratings
Review scores
Source	Rating
AllMusic	3.5/5 stars
Christgau's Record Guide	B+

Eye of a Hurricane is the sixth studio album by American country music artist John Anderson. It was released in June 1984. It produced singles in its title track, "She Sure Got Away with My Heart", and "I Wish I Could Write You a Song". It was re-released in 2007.

== Track listing ==
No.	Title	Writer(s)	Length
1.	"I Can't Take Another Heartache"	Scott Anders, Michael Murrah, Roger Murrah	2:53
2.	"Red Georgia Clay"	Hal Bynum, "Wild" Bill Emerson, Jody Emerson	2:35
3.	"Eye of a Hurricane"	Jerry Fuller	3:24
4.	"I Wish I Could Write You a Song"	John Anderson, Lionel Delmore	3:09
5.	"The Sun's Gonna Shine (On Our Back Door)"	Anderson, Kerry O'Neil, Mark Sherrill	3:08
6.	"She Sure Got Away with My Heart"	Walt Aldridge, Tom Brasfield	2:47
7.	"Take That Woman Away"	Paul Kennerley	3:09
8.	"Lonely Is Another State"	Anderson, Ervan James Parker	3:53
9.	"One Shot Deal"	Bob DiPiero, John Scott Sherrill	2:43
10.	"I Wish I Had Loved Her That Way"	Jim McBride, R. Murrah	3:33

== Personnel ==
- Guitar: John Anderson, Fred Carter Jr., Bill Emerson, Peter Michaud, Vern Pilder, Buck Reid. Mandolin: Tom Morley
- Bass: Larry Emmons, X. Lincoln
- Keyboards: Mike Jordan
- Drums: James Wolfe
- Percussion: Lou Bradley
- Saxophone: Bill Puett
- Harmonica: Mack Vickery
- Strings: Jack Abell, John Catchings, Mark Feldman, Jim Grosjean, Cornelia Heard, Ted Madsen, Bob Mason, Conni McCollister, Laura Molyneaux, Tom Morley, Sam Terranova, Kristin Wilkinson
- Backing Vocals: Deeanna Anderson Wall, Donna Kay Anderson, Jamie Anderson

== Chart performance ==
=== Weekly charts ===
Chart (1984)	Peak position
Canadian Country Albums (RPM)	16
US Top Country Albums (Billboard)	3

=== Year-end charts ===
Chart (1984)	Position
US Top Country Albums (Billboard)	43

=== Singles ===
Year	Single	Peak positions	
Year	Single	US Country	CAN Country
1984	"I Wish I Could Write You a Song"	14	12
1984	"She Sure Got Away with My Heart"	3	4
1985	"Eye of a Hurricane"	20	17
