= John Anderson (album) =

Studio album by John Anderson
- Released: July 1, 1980
- Recorded: 1978–1979
- Studios: Columbia, Nashville, TN
- Genre: Country
- Length: 33:34
- Label: Warner Bros. Nashville
- Producer: Norro Wilson

John Anderson chronology
John Anderson (1980)	John Anderson 2 (1981)

Singles from John Anderson
- 1. "The Girl at the End of the Bar" Released: 1978; 2. "Low Dog Blues" Released: 1979; 3. "Your Lying Blue Eyes" Released: October 27, 1979; 4. "She Just Started Liking Cheatin' Songs" Released: March 15, 1980; 5. "If There Were No Memories" Released: 1980; 6. "1959" Released: November 22, 1980

Professional ratings
Review scores
Source	Rating
Allmusic	4/5 stars
Christgau's Record Guide	B+

John Anderson is the debut studio album by American country music artist John Anderson. It was released in 1980 on the Warner Bros. Records label. The album produced the singles "The Girl at the End of the Bar", "Low Dog Blues", "1959", "She Just Started Liking Cheatin' Songs", "If There Were No Memories" and "Your Lying Blue Eyes".

== Track listing ==
No.	Title	Writer(s)	Length
1.	"Havin' Hard Times"	John Anderson, Lionel Delmore	3:18
2.	"Something Borrowed, Something Blue"	Wayland Holyfield, Norro Wilson	3:07
3.	"Shoot Low, Sheriff!"	Monroe Fields, Carmol Taylor	2:12
4.	"The Girl at the End of the Bar"	Anderson, Delmore	3:28
5.	"Low Dog Blues"	Anderson, Delmore	2:56
6.	"1959"	Gary Gentry	3:00
7.	"She Just Started Liking Cheatin' Songs"	Kent Robbins	2:24
8.	"The Arms of a Fool"	Ronal McCown	2:38
9.	"It Looks Like the Party Is Over"	Anderson, Delmore	2:49
10.	"If There Were No Memories"	McCown	2:18
11.	"Your Lying Blue Eyes"	Ken McDuffie	3:03
12.	"You're Right, I'm Wrong, I'm Sorry"	Anderson, Betty Gallup, Ervan James Parker	2:21

== Personnel ==
- Tommy Allsup - acoustic guitar
- John Anderson - lead vocals, background vocals
- Phil Baugh - electric guitar
- Harold Bradley - six string bass guitar
- David Briggs - piano
- Tommy Cogbill - bass guitar
- Pete Drake - steel guitar
- Ray Edenton - electric guitar
- Ralph Gallant (Larrie Londin) - drums
- Tommy Jackson - fiddle
- Terry McMillan (musician) - harmonica
- Kenny Malone - drums
- Bob Moore - upright bass
- Hargus "Pig" Robbins - piano
- Billy Sanford - electric guitar
- Henry Strzelecki - bass guitar
- Pete Wade - electric guitar
- Bobby Wood - piano
- Reggie Young - electric guitar

== Chart performance ==
Chart (1980)	Peak position
U.S. Billboard Top Country Albums	61
