= Would You Catch a Falling Star =

Single by John Anderson

from the album I Just Came Home to Count the Memories
- B-side: "I Danced with the San Antonio Rose"
- Released: April 17, 1982
- Genre: Country
- Length: 2:56 (CD/Digital Release) 2:53 (45 RPM Vinyl Release)
- Label: Warner Bros. Nashville
- Songwriter(s): Bobby Braddock
- Producer(s): Frank Jones; John Anderson

John Anderson singles chronology
"I Just Came Home to Count the Memories" (1981)	"Would You Catch a Falling Star" (1982)	"Wild and Blue" (1982)

"Would You Catch a Falling Star" is a song written by Bobby Braddock, and recorded by American country music artist John Anderson. It was released in April 1982 as the second single from the album I Just Came Home to Count the Memories. The song reached number 6 on the Billboard Hot Country Singles & Tracks chart.

The song was covered by Del McCoury and Sierra Hull on the 2022 John Anderson tribute album Something Borrowed, Something New.

== Content ==
"Would You Catch a Falling Star" is a tongue in cheek look at the pitfalls of stardom and fame, describing a one-time superstar whose drawing power and appeal to fans is fading.

The song opens with the former superstar finishing a country music show attended by a small crowd. He then departs backstage half drunk and meets a woman. "With all his country charm" he asks her, "Would you catch a falling star before he crashes to the ground?" He offers to bring his guitar and sing her a song in exchange for taking him home. The second verse tells of his former wealth and fame and his descent back into obscurity, trading a large bus for a small van.

== Charts ==
=== Weekly charts ===
Chart (1982)	Peak position
US Hot Country Songs (Billboard)	6
Canadian RPM Country Tracks	15

=== Year-end charts ===
Chart (1982)	Position
US Hot Country Songs (Billboard)	42
