= Too Tough to Tame =

Studio album by John Anderson
- Released: August 8, 1989
- Studio: Sound Stage, Nashville, TN
- Genre: Country
- Label: Universal/Capitol Nashville
- Producer: Jimmy Bowen

John Anderson chronology
10 (1988)	Too Tough to Tame (1989)	Greatest Hits Vol. 2 (1990)

Singles from Too Tough to Tame
- 1. "Who's Lovin' My Baby" Released: August 1, 1989; 2. "Tryin' to Make a Living on the Road" Released: January 1990

Professional ratings
Review scores
Source	Rating
AllMusic	2.5/5 stars
Entertainment Weekly	B

Too Tough to Tame is the eleventh studio album by American country music artist John Anderson. It was released on August 8, 1989, and was originally on the Universal Records label, which became Capitol Nashville. The album featured the singles "Who's Lovin' My Baby" and "Tryin' to Make a Living on the Road," which was the first Anderson single to not chart since "Swoop Down Sweet Jesus" in 1975. It was the first album of his career to not feature a Top 40 Hit.

== Track listing ==
1. "Too Tough to Tame" - (John Anderson, Max D. Barnes) 2:55
2. "Guitars That Won't Stay in Tune" (Troy Seals, Eddie Setser) - 2:06
3. "The Tears That I Cry" - (Anderson, Paul Kennerley) 3:21
4. "Tryin' to Make a Living on the Road" (Anderson, Lionel Delmore) - 2:45
5. "Maybe Go Down" (Paul Overstreet) - 3:45
6. "Who's Lovin' My Baby" (Curtis Wright) - 3:21
7. "When the Darkness Falls" (Anderson, Kennerley) - 3:02
8. "She Worships the Quicksand That I Walk On" (Ken Bell, Tony Stampley) - 2:37
9. "Bamboo Annie" - (Anderson, Delmore) 2:49
10. "There Was a Time When I Was Alone" (Anderson, Delmore) - 3:15

== Personnel ==
- Donna Anderson - background vocals
- John Anderson - acoustic guitar, lead vocals, background vocals
- Eddie Bayers - drums
- Glen Hardin - piano
- Mike Jordan - organ, synthesizer
- Vernon Pilder - acoustic guitar
- Buck Reid - steel guitar
- Michael Rhodes - bass guitar
- Joe Spivey - fiddle, mandolin
- Billy Joe Walker Jr. - acoustic guitar, electric guitar
- Deanna Anderson Wall - background vocals
- Curtis Young - background vocals
- Reggie Young - acoustic guitar, electric guitar

== Chart ==
=== Singles ===
Year	Song	Chart	Position
1989	"Who's Lovin' My Baby"	Hot Country Singles	66
1990	"Tryin' to Make a Livin' on the Road"	Canadian Country Singles	88
