= I Fell in the Water =

Single by John Anderson

from the album Solid Ground
- B-side: "All Things to All Things"
- Released: August 28, 1993
- Genre: Country
- Length: 2:40
- Label: BNA
- Songwriters: Jerry Salley; Jeff Stevens
- Producers: James Stroud; John Anderson

John Anderson singles chronology
"Money in the Bank" (1993)	"I Fell in the Water" (1993)	"I've Got It Made" (1993)

"I Fell in the Water" is a song written by Jerry Salley and Jeff Stevens, and recorded by American country music artist John Anderson. It was released in August 1993 as the second single from his album Solid Ground. The song reached number 13 on the Billboard Hot Country Singles & Tracks chart in November 1993.

== Chart performance ==
Chart (1993)	Peak position
Canada Country Singles (RPM)	22
US Hot Country Songs (Billboard)	13
