= Blue Skies Again (album) =

Studio album by John Anderson
- Released: November 2, 1987
- Studio: Sound Stage, Nashville, TN
- Genre: Country
- Length: 29:50
- Label: MCA Nashville
- Producer: John Anderson, Jimmy Bowen

John Anderson chronology
Countrified (1986)	Blue Skies Again (1987)	10 (1988)

Singles from Blue Skies Again
- 1. "When Your Yellow Brick Road Turns Blue" Released: September 1987; 2. "Somewhere Between Ragged and Right" Released: December 3, 1987; 3. "It's Hard to Keep This Ship Together" Released: March 1988

Professional ratings
Review scores
Source	Rating
The Village Voice	B+

Blue Skies Again is the ninth studio album by American country music artist John Anderson. It was released on November 2, 1987, as his first album for MCA Nashville after leaving Warner Bros. Records in 1986.

== Track listing ==
No.	Title	Writer(s)	Length
1.	"Blue Skies Again"	Michael P. Heeney	3:26
2.	"There's Nothing Left for Me to Take for Granted"	John Anderson, Lionel Delmore	3:01
3.	"Quittin' Time"	William Bell, Steve Cropper, Ben Dover, John Jarrard, Russell Smith	3:57
4.	"Just for You"	Anderson	2:35
5.	"Somewhere Between Ragged and Right" (duet with Waylon Jennings)	Roger Murrah, Waylon Jennings	3:20
6.	"When Your Yellow Brick Road Turns Blue"	Bernie Nelson, Gary Vincent	3:08
7.	"His and Hers"	Paul Craft	2:05
8.	"I Make It Hard to Lose"	Mark Germino	2:43
9.	"Lying in Her Arms"	Anderson, Paul Kennerley	2:45
10.	"It's Hard to Keep This Ship Together"	Anderson, Fred Carter Jr.	2:50

== Personnel ==
- Donna Anderson - background vocals
- John Anderson - lead vocals
- Eddie Bayers - drums and percussion on "Somewhere Between Ragged and Right"
- Jerry Bridges - bass guitar on "Somewhere Between Ragged and Right"
- Buddy Emmons - steel guitar
- David Hungate - bass guitar
- John Barlow Jarvis - DX-7, piano
- Waylon Jennings - duet vocals on "Somewhere Between Ragged and Right"
- Mike Lawler - synthesizer, keyboards on "Somewhere Between Ragged and Right"
- Larrie Londin - drums
- Gary Scruggs - acoustic guitar on "Somewhere Between Ragged and Right"
- Joe Spivey - fiddle, mandolin
- Billy Joe Walker Jr. - acoustic guitar, electric guitar
- Deanna Anderson Wall - background vocals
- Curtis Young - background vocals
- Reggie Young - electric guitar

== Chart performance ==
=== Album ===
Chart (1987)	Peak position
U.S. Billboard Top Country Albums	41

=== Singles ===
Year	Single	Peak positions	
Year	Single	US Country	CAN Country
1987	"When Your Yellow Brick Road Turns Blue"	48	—
1988	"Somewhere Between Ragged and Right" (with Waylon Jennings)	23	35
1988	"It's Hard to Keep This Ship Together"	65	*
