= Let Go of the Stone =

Single by John Anderson

from the album Seminole Wind
- B-side: "Look Away"
- Released: November 16, 1992
- Genre: Country
- Length: 3:19
- Label: BNA
- Songwriters: Max D. Barnes; Max T. Barnes
- Producer: James Stroud

John Anderson singles chronology
"Seminole Wind" (1992)	"Let Go of the Stone" (1992)	"Money in the Bank" (1993)

"Let Go of the Stone" is a song written by Max D. Barnes and Max T. Barnes, and recorded by American country music artist John Anderson. It was released in November 1992 as the fifth single from his album Seminole Wind. The song reached number 7 on the Billboard Hot Country Singles & Tracks chart in 1993.

== Critical reception ==
Deborah Evans Price, of Billboard magazine reviewed the song favorably, calling it "a thoughtfully written and exquisitely executed ballad." She goes on to say that Anderson is "at his most emotionally persuasive here."

== Music video ==
The music video was directed by Michael Salomon and premiered on CMT, The Nashville Network and GAC in late 1992.

== Chart performance ==
"Let Go of the Stone" debuted at number 59 on the U.S. Billboard Hot Country Singles & Tracks for the week of November 28, 1992.

Chart (1992–1993)	Peak position
Canada Country Singles (RPM)	11
US Hot Country Songs (Billboard)	7
