= I Just Came Home to Count the Memories =

Studio album by John Anderson
- Released: October 14, 1981
- Studio: Columbia, Nashville, TN
- Genre: Country
- Length: 32:49
- Label: Warner Bros. Nashville
- Producer: Frank Jones, John Anderson

John Anderson chronology
John Anderson 2 (1981)	I Just Came Home to Count the Memories (1981)	Wild & Blue (1982)

Singles from I Just Came Home to Count the Memories
- 1. "I Just Came Home to Count the Memories" Released: November 21, 1981; 2. "Would You Catch a Falling Star" Released: April 17, 1982

Professional ratings
Review scores
Source	Rating
AllMusic	3.5/5 stars
Christgau's Record Guide	B
The Rolling Stone Album Guide	3/5 stars

I Just Came Home to Count the Memories is the third studio album by American country music artist John Anderson. It was released in October 1981 under Warner Bros. Records. Three singles were released from this album, "Would You Catch a Falling Star", "I Danced with the San Antone Rose", and the title track.

== Track listing ==
No.	Title	Writer(s)	Length
1.	"I Just Came Home to Count the Memories"	Glenn Ray	3:29
2.	"Would You Catch a Falling Star"	Bobby Braddock	2:52
3.	"One of Those Old Things"	Jo-El Sonnier, Hoy Lindsey	3:35
4.	"Girl for You"	John Anderson, Lionel Delmore	2:32
5.	"When a Lady is Cloudin' Your Vision"	Anderson, Sandy Pinkard	3:14
6.	"Stop in the Road"	Ronal McCown	2:52
7.	"I Danced with the San Antone Rose"	Anderson, L. Delmore	3:22
8.	"Don't Think Twice, It's Alright"	Bob Dylan	3:38
9.	"Jessie Clay and the 12:05"	Gary Setton	2:22
10.	"Trail of Time"	Alton Delmore	4:01

== Personnel ==
- Acoustic Guitar: Bobby Thompson, Pete Wade
- Background Vocals: Donna Kay Anderson, Ronnie Drake, Beckie Foster, Joy Gardner, Allen Henson
- Banjo: Bobby Thompson
- Bass guitar: Henry Strzelecki
- Drums: Jerry Carrigan, Buddy Harman, Kenny Malone
- Electric guitar: Fred Carter Jr.
- Fiddle: Buddy Spicher
- Lead Vocals: John Anderson
- Piano: Hargus "Pig" Robbins, Bobby Wood
- Steel Guitar: Pete Drake, Buddy Emmons
- Strings: The Sheldon Kurland Strings
- Tic-Tac Bass: Harold Bradley
- Upright Bass: Bob Moore

== Chart performance ==
Chart (1981)	Peak position
U.S. Billboard Top Country Albums	40
