= I'm Just an Old Chunk of Coal (But I'm Gonna Be a Diamond Someday) =

Single by John Anderson

from the album John Anderson 2
- B-side: "Havin' Hard Times"
- Released: March 28, 1981
- Genre: Country
- Length: 3:47
- Label: Warner Bros. Nashville
- Songwriter(s): Billy Joe Shaver
- Producer(s): Norro Wilson

John Anderson singles chronology
"1959" (1980)	"I'm Just an Old Chunk of Coal (But I'm Gonna Be a Diamond Someday)" (1981)	"Chicken Truck" (1981)

"I'm Just an Old Chunk of Coal (But I'm Gonna Be a Diamond Someday)" is a song written and originally recorded by Billy Joe Shaver. American country music artist John Anderson released the song in March 1981 as the first single from his album John Anderson 2. The song reached number 4 on the Billboard Hot Country Singles & Tracks chart.

The song is briefly sung by the title character in one scene of Jimmy Neutron: Boy Genius and featured in the end credits of Norm Macdonald's Netflix comedy special Norm Macdonald: Nothing Special. Two covers of the song were released in 2022, performed by Jamey Johnson on the John Anderson tribute album Something Borrowed, Something New and Miranda Lambert on the Billy Joe Shaver tribute album Live Forever.

This song was played at the end of David Johansen's Mansion of Fun weekly radio show on Sirius XM Radio. David Johansen is no longer with us, but Sirius continues to air past shows on The Loft.

== Chart performance ==
Chart (1981)	Peak position
US Hot Country Songs (Billboard)	4
Canadian RPM Country Tracks	2
