= Country 'til I Die =

Country 'Til I Die

Studio album by John Anderson
- Released: October 11, 1994
- Studios: Loud, The Music Mill, Sound Stage, Nashville
- Genre: Country
- Label: BNA
- Producers: Flip Anderson (track 10); John Anderson (all tracks except 10); Tracy Lawrence (track 10); James Stroud (all tracks)

John Anderson chronology
"Christmas Time" (1994)	Country 'Til I Die (1994)	Paradise (1996)

Singles from Country 'Til I Die
- 1. "Country 'Til I Die" Released: August 1994; 2. "Bend It Until It Breaks" Released: November 28, 1994; 3. "Mississippi Moon" Released: April 10, 1995

Professional ratings
Review scores
Source	Rating
AllMusic	3/5 stars

Country 'Til I Die is the fifteenth studio album by the American country music artist John Anderson. It was released in 1994 under the BNA Records label. The album produced the singles "Bend It Until It Breaks", "Mississippi Moon", and the title track, which respectively peaked at Nos. 3, 15, and 35 on the country singles charts. Also included were a new recording of Anderson's signature hit "Swingin'" and a cover of the Georgia Satellites hit "Keep Your Hands to Yourself".

== Track listing ==
No.	Title	Writer(s)	Length
1.	"Country ’Til I Die"	John Anderson, Troy Seals, Eddie Setser	3:02
2.	"Bend It Until It Breaks"	Anderson, Lionel Delmore	4:05
3.	"The Good"	Bobby Braddock	4:05
4.	"The Real Deal"	Robert Ellis Orrall, Billy Spencer, Curtis Wright	2:32
5.	"Keep Your Hands to Yourself"	Dan Baird	3:44
6.	"Mississippi Moon"	Tony Joe White, Carson Whitsett	4:15
7.	"It Ain’t Pneumonia, It’s the Blues"	Anderson, Delmore, Larry Emmons	2:53
8.	"Where the Children Have Gone"	Anderson, Delmore	3:11
9.	"Swingin' (new version)"	Anderson, Delmore	2:59
10.	"Hillbilly with a Heartache" (featuring Tracy Lawrence)"	Bobby Alexander, Richard E. Carpenter, Cris Moore	3:41

== Chart performance ==
=== Album ===
Chart (1994)	Peak position
U.S. Billboard Top Country Albums	43

=== Singles ===
Year	Single	Peak positions	
Year	Single	US Country	CAN Country
1994	"Country 'til I Die"	35	31
1994	"Bend It Until It Breaks"	3	28
1995	"Mississippi Moon"	15	11
