= Chicken Truck =

Single by John Anderson

from the album John Anderson 2
- B-side: "I Love You a Thousand Ways"
- Released: August 1, 1981
- Genre: Country
- Length: 2:43
- Label: Warner Bros. Nashville
- Songwriters: John Anderson; Monroe Fields; Ervan James Parker
- Producer: Norro Wilson

John Anderson singles chronology
"I'm Just an Old Chunk of Coal (But I'm Gonna Be a Diamond Someday)" (1981)	"Chicken Truck" (1981)	"I Just Came Home to Count the Memories" (1981)

"Chicken Truck" is a song co-written and recorded by American country music artist John Anderson. It was released in August 1981 as the second single from album John Anderson 2. The song reached number 8 on the Billboard Hot Country Singles & Tracks chart. The song's b-side, "I Love You a Thousand Ways", charted at number 54 in the U.S. and number 11 in Canada. Anderson wrote the song with Monroe Fields and Ervan James Parker.

"Chicken Truck" was later the B-side to Anderson's 1984 single "Eye of a Hurricane".

== Content ==
The song features Anderson (in first person narration) discussing an experience of getting stuck behind a Georgia truck hauling a load of chickens (Georgia is a major poultry-producing state), on "Highway 65" (which is not specifically identified; it could be either Alabama State Route 65, a winding, 2-lane highway in Jackson County in the northeast corner of Alabama, or Interstate 65, in the north central portion of Alabama near the Tennessee border) heading to Tennessee in mid-July. The driver is unable to pass the truck, which is causing a potential crash as the feathers from the chickens are clouding up the driver's windshield. In the second verse Anderson is finally able to pass the truck, and notices the driver has a box of "Colonel Sanders" on the dashboard while carelessly tossing the scraps out the window (and on to Anderson's vehicle).

== Chart performance ==
Chart (1981)	Peak position
US Hot Country Songs (Billboard)	8
