= Money in the Bank (John Anderson song) =

Single by John Anderson

from the album Solid Ground
- B-side: "Nashville Tears"
- Released: April 16, 1993
- Genre: Country
- Length: 2:58
- Label: BNA
- Songwriters: Mark D. Sanders; Bob DiPiero; John Jarrard
- Producers: James Stroud; John Anderson

John Anderson singles chronology
"Let Go of the Stone" (1993)	"Money in the Bank" (1993)	"I Fell in the Water" (1993)

"Money in the Bank" is a song written by Bob DiPiero, John Jarrard and Mark D. Sanders, and recorded by American country music artist John Anderson. It was released in April 1993 as the lead single from his album Solid Ground. It peaked at number one on the United States Billboard Hot Country Singles & Tracks chart, and number one on the Canadian RPM Country Tracks chart. It was his final number one hit.

== Music video ==
The music video was directed by Jim Shea and premiered in early 1993.

== Chart positions ==
"Money in the Bank" debuted at number 61 on the U.S. Billboard Hot Country Singles & Tracks for the week of May 1, 1993.

Chart (1993)	Peak position
Canada Country Tracks (RPM)	1
US Hot Country Songs (Billboard)	1

=== Year-end charts ===
Chart (1993)	Position
Canada Country Tracks (RPM)	20
US Country Songs (Billboard)	18
