= Black Sheep (John Anderson song) =

Single by John Anderson

from the album All the People Are Talkin'
- B-side: "Call on Me"
- Released: September 1983
- Genre: Country
- Length: 2:59
- Label: Warner Bros. Nashville
- Songwriter(s): Robert Altman; Danny Darst
- Producer(s): John Anderson; Lou Bradley

John Anderson singles chronology
"Goin' Down Hill" (1983)	"Black Sheep" (1983)	"Let Somebody Else Drive" (1984)

"Black Sheep" is a song written by Danny Darst and Robert Altman, and recorded by American country music artist John Anderson. It was released in September 1983 as the first single from the album All the People Are Talkin'. The song was Anderson's third number one on the country chart. "Black Sheep" went to number one for one week and spent a total of 14 weeks within the top 40.

== Content ==
In the song, a young man, one of four siblings, moans that he is the family's black sheep, while his older brother and little sister have become very successful – the brother as a prominent physician, the sister after marrying a successful banker – and often brag about the things they have been able to do with their money. (The lyrics also mention a "little brother", but no lyrics are dedicated solely to him regarding his success.)

Meantime, the young man, an over-the-road truck driver, bemoans that he is only able to afford a two-room shack while his wife has to work to help make ends meet. Still, he seems to love his family, and tells her to "wake me up early, be good to my dogs, and teach my children to pray."

== Chart performance ==
Chart (1983)	Peak position
US Hot Country Songs (Billboard)	1
Canadian RPM Country Tracks	1
