= Wild and Blue =

Single by John Anderson

from the album Wild & Blue
- B-side: "Honky Tonk Hearts"
- Released: September 1982
- Genre: Country; bluegrass
- Length: 2:53
- Label: Warner Bros. Nashville
- Songwriter: John Scott Sherrill
- Producers: John Anderson; Frank Jones

John Anderson singles chronology
"Would You Catch a Falling Star" (1982)	"Wild and Blue" (1982)	"Swingin'" (1983)

"Wild and Blue" is a song written by John Scott Sherrill, and recorded by American country music artist John Anderson. It was released in September 1982 as the first single and title track from the album Wild & Blue. The song was Anderson's eleventh country hit and the first of five number ones on the country chart. The single went to number one for two weeks and spent a total of eleven weeks within the top 40. John's sister Donna Kay Anderson provides background vocals.

Punk-folk band The Mekons covered "Wild and Blue" on their 1991 album Curse of the Mekons. The alternative country band Freakwater also recorded their cover of the song in 1991, for their album "Dancing Under Water." The 2014 re-issue of Lucinda Williams' self-titled album includes a live cover of "Wild and Blue", recorded on her 1989 European tour.

Hank Williams Jr. covered the song on his 1984 album Major Moves.

The Country/Southern Rock Band The Steel Woods covered the song on their 2017 album Straw in the Wind. The song was covered by Brent Cobb on the 2022 John Anderson tribute album Something Borrowed, Something New.

Waylon Jennings recorded the song in the 1980s and is set to be released on his posthumous album Diamonds later in 2026 as the album's 5th track.

== Charts ==
Chart (1982–1983)	Peak position
US Hot Country Songs (Billboard)	1
Canadian RPM Country Tracks	15
