= 1959 (John Anderson song) =

Single by John Anderson

from the album John Anderson
- B-side: "It Looks Like the Party Is Over"
- Released: November 22, 1980
- Genre: Country
- Length: 3:00
- Label: Warner Bros. Nashville
- Songwriter: Gary Gentry
- Producer: Norro Wilson

John Anderson singles chronology
"If There Were No Memories" (1980)	"1959" (1980)	"I'm Just an Old Chunk of Coal (But I'm Gonna Be a Diamond Someday)" (1981)

"1959" is a song written by Gary Gentry, and recorded by American country music artist John Anderson. It was released in November 1980 as the fifth single from the album John Anderson. The song reached #7 on the Billboard Hot Country Singles & Tracks chart. The song was covered by John Prine on the 2022 John Anderson tribute album Something Borrowed, Something New.

== Content ==
The singer reflects on the year 1959, particularly a relationship he had that year with a girl named Betty, to whom he is singing the song. The "most important thing" for them was making sure the singer's truck had gas so they could go to the drive-in movie. He was drafted into the military after graduation, and Betty married someone else while he was away. He cries whenever he reads the letters she wrote to him, promising she would never leave him. He has even kept the old truck he had that year (in which the couple "went all the way"), and looking at it takes him "back to '59."

== Chart performance ==
Chart (1980–1981)	Peak position
US Hot Country Songs (Billboard)	7
Canadian RPM Country Tracks	4
