= Countrified (John Anderson album) =

Studio album by John Anderson
- Released: October 6, 1986
- Studio: Digital Recorders, The Loft, The Music Mill, and Sound Stage, Nashville, TN
- Genre: Country
- Length: 36:16
- Label: Warner Bros. Nashville
- Producer: Jim Ed Norman

John Anderson chronology
Tokyo, Oklahoma (1985)	Countrified (1986)	Blue Skies Again (1987)

Singles from Countrified
- 1. "Honky Tonk Crowd" Released: August 4, 1986; 2. "Countrified" Released: December 1986; 3. "What's So Different About You" Released: March 1987

Professional ratings
Review scores
Source	Rating
AllMusic	2.5/5 stars
Christgau's Record Guide	B−

Countrified is the eighth studio album by American country music artist John Anderson. It was released on October 6, 1986. It was his last studio album for Warner Bros. Records before leaving for MCA Nashville in 1987. The album featured "The Fightin' Side of Me", a song written and originally recorded by country singer Merle Haggard as well as a cover of the gospel standard "Peace in the Valley."

== Track listing ==
No.	Title	Writer(s)	Length
1.	"Countrified"	Tom Lazaros	3:27
2.	"What’s So Different About You"	John Anderson, Fred Carter Jr.	3:30
3.	"Yellow Creek"	Ken McDuffie	3:43
4.	"If I Could Have My Way"	Anderson, Carter	3:39
5.	"Do You Have a Garter Belt"	Tony Joe White	3:02
6.	"Honky Tonk Crowd"	Larry Cordle, Lionel Delmore	3:43
7.	"The Fighting Side of Me"	Merle Haggard	3:02
8.	"Wife’s Little Pleasures"	Buck Moore, Tony Stampley, Mentor Williams	4:03
9.	"You Can’t Judge a Book (By the Cover)"	Willie Dixon	4:24
10.	"Peace in the Valley"	Rev. Thomas A. Dorsey	3:43

== Chart performance ==
=== Album ===
Chart (1986)	Peak position
U.S. Billboard Top Country Albums	17

=== Singles ===
Year	Single	Peak positions	
Year	Single	US Country	CAN Country
1986	"Honky Tonk Crowd"	10	7
1987	"Countrified"	44	31
1987	"What's So Different About You"	55	—
