= Straight Tequila Night =

Single by John Anderson

from the album Seminole Wind
- B-side: "Seminole Wind"
- Released: December 2, 1991
- Recorded: 1991
- Genre: Country
- Length: 2:55
- Label: BNA
- Songwriters: Debbie Hupp; Kent Robbins
- Producer: James Stroud

John Anderson singles chronology
"Who Got Our Love" (1991)	"Straight Tequila Night" (1991)	"When It Comes to You" (1992)

Music video
- "Straight Tequila Night" at CMT.com

"Straight Tequila Night" is a song written by Debbie Hupp and Kent Robbins, and recorded by American country music singer John Anderson. It was released on December 2, 1991, as the second single from Anderson's album Seminole Wind. It reached number-one on the country charts in the United States and Canada. It was Anderson's first number one song since 1983 and considered his comeback single.

The song was covered by Ashley McBryde on the 2022 John Anderson tribute album Something Borrowed, Something New.

== Content ==
The song is a mid-tempo number in which the narrator is a person counseling a man in a tavern, who is regarding a frequent female patron, sitting by herself at a table ("Tonight, she's only sippin' white wine"). It is implied or assumed that she is typically much more open and outgoing when any other type of alcohol is consumed ("She's friendly and fun-lovin' most of the time."), except for "straight tequila"; this will have the effect of making the woman think about her ex-lover and cause her to become upset and agitated ("She'll start thinkin' about him, and she's ready to fight").

== Chart positions ==
Chart (1991–1992)	Peak position
Canada Country Singles (RPM)	1
US Hot Country Songs (Billboard)	1

=== Year-end charts ===
Chart (1992)	Position
Canada Country Tracks (RPM)	16
US Country Songs (Billboard)	16
