= She Just Started Liking Cheatin' Songs =

1980 single by John Anderson

Single by John Anderson

from the album John Anderson
- B-side: "I Wish I Could Write You a Song"
- Released: March 15, 1980
- Genre: Country
- Length: 2:24
- Label: Warner Bros. Nashville
- Songwriter: Kent Robbins
- Producer: Norro Wilson

John Anderson singles chronology
| "Your Lying Blue Eyes" (1979) | "She Just Started Liking Cheatin' Songs" (1980) | "If There Were No Memories" (1980) |

"She Just Started Liking Cheatin' Songs" is a song written by Kent Robbins and recorded by American country music artist John Anderson. It was released in March 1980 as the third single from the album John Anderson. The song reached #13 on the Billboard Hot Country Singles & Tracks chart.

== Chart performance ==
| Chart (1980) | Peak position |
|---|---|
| US Hot Country Songs (Billboard) | 13 |
| Canadian RPM Country Tracks | 60 |

== Alan Jackson version ==
"She Just Started Liking Cheatin' Songs"

Song by Alan Jackson

from the album Under the Influence
- Released: October 26, 1999
- Genre: Country
- Length: 2:43
- Label: Arista Nashville
- Songwriter: Kent Robbins
- Producer: Keith Stegall

Alan Jackson covered the song for his 1999 album Under the Influence. Although not released as a single, Jackson's cover charted at #72 due to unsolicited airplay.
