= Seminole Wind (song) =

Single by John Anderson

from the album Seminole Wind
- B-side: "Steamy Windows"
- Released: August 10, 1992
- Genre: Country
- Length: 3:58 (album version); 3:04 (single version)
- Label: BNA
- Songwriter: John Anderson
- Producer: James Stroud

John Anderson singles chronology
"When It Comes to You" (1992)	"Seminole Wind" (1992)	"Let Go of the Stone" (1992)

"Seminole Wind" is a song written and recorded by American country music artist John Anderson. It was released in August 1992 as the fourth single and title track from the album of the same name. It peaked at number 2 on the United States Billboard Hot Country Singles & Tracks chart for 2 weeks, behind "No One Else on Earth" by Wynonna and it reached number 1 on the Canadian RPM Country Tracks chart. Before its release as a single, it was included on the B-side of the album's second single release, "Straight Tequila Night." Following Anderson's death in October 2026, the song was designated as the Florida state anthem.

"Seminole Wind" was covered by Donna the Buffalo in 1998, as well as well-known folk artist James Taylor on his 2008 album Covers. It was covered by Luke Combs on the 2022 John Anderson tribute album Something Borrowed, Something New and in 2024 by JJ Grey & Mofro on their 2024 album Olustee.

== Critical reception ==
Deborah Evans Price of Billboard magazine reviewed the song favorably, calling it a "vividly imagistic song". She went on to say that it "conveys feelings of urgency and great loss without being self-righteous or preachy."

== Content ==
The song has naturalistic overtones, lamenting the destruction of the environment by humans for economic gain. This is illustrated in the first verse, Anderson sings:

"Ever since the days of old,
Men would search for wealth untold.
They'd dig for silver and for gold,
And leave the empty holes."

The second verse discusses the draining of the Florida Everglades due to flooding, and Seminole war chief Osceola, who led the Seminole who lived there during the Second Seminole War.

The song begins with a slow piano and fiddle solo, before leading into an up-tempo country rock beat of approximately 126 beats per minute. It is in E Dorian with a main chord pattern of Em-G-D-A. During the song's instrumental outro that follows the repeat of the chorus a second time, the song goes back to slow fiddle and piano chords about halfway through.

== Music video ==
The music video features views of Indian lands, people, and traditions. It was directed by Jim Shea. It features a large group of Seminole Indian tribes performing with Anderson beside a campfire. Anderson is also seen riding an airboat through the swamp in some scenes. Anderson had to get permission from the tribes' masters before they and their land could be filmed. It was featured in the show CMT's 100 Greatest Videos in 2004 and 2008. It was filmed in the Florida Everglades.

== Chart positions ==
"Seminole Wind" debuted at number 71 on the U.S. Billboard Hot Country Singles & Tracks for the week of August 15, 1992.

Chart (1992)	Peak position
Canada Country Singles (RPM)	1
US Hot Country Songs (Billboard)	2

=== Year-end charts ===
Chart (1992)	Position
Canada Country Tracks (RPM)	10
US Country Songs (Billboard)	59
