= Swingin' (John Anderson song) =

1983 single by John Anderson

Single by John Anderson

from the album Wild & Blue
- B-side: "Honky Tonk Saturday Night"
- Released: December 1982 (Charted on January 15, 1983)
- Studio: Columbia Recording Studios (Nashville, TN)
- Genre: Country
- Length: 3:04
- Label: Warner Bros. Nashville
- Songwriters: John Anderson; Lionel Delmore
- Producers: John Anderson; Frank Jones

John Anderson singles chronology
"Wild and Blue" (1982)	"Swingin'" (1982)	"Goin' Down Hill" (1983)

"Swingin'" (1983)
A 30 second sample of John Anderson's "Swingin'", featuring the chorus.

"Swingin'" is a song co-written and recorded by American country music singer John Anderson. It was released in January 1983 as the second single from his album Wild & Blue. The song was the second of five number one singles in Anderson's career, spending one week at the top of the Hot Country Songs charts.

It quickly sold over a million copies in the United States, receiving a gold certification from the Recording Industry Association of America. It won the 'Single of the Year' award from the Country Music Association. Anderson re-recorded the song for his 1994 album Country 'til I Die on BNA Records. This re-recording served as the b-side to the album's title track, which was also the first single from it. In addition to LeAnn Rimes, Chris Young performed an acoustic cover of "Swingin'" for his 2010 EP Voices.

== Chart performance ==
"Swingin'" debuted at number 71 on the U.S. Billboard Hot Country Singles for the week of January 15, 1983.

=== Weekly charts ===
Chart (1983)	Peak position
US Hot Country Songs (Billboard)	1
US Billboard Hot 100	43
US Cash Box Top 100	30
Canadian RPM Country Tracks	4

=== Year-end charts ===
Chart (1983)	Position
US Hot Country Songs (Billboard)	9

== LeAnn Rimes version ==
"Swingin'"

Single by LeAnn Rimes

from the album Lady & Gentlemen
- Released: June 14, 2010
- Genre: Country
- Length: 2:55
- Label: Asylum-Curb
- Songwriters: John Anderson; Lionel Delmore
- Producers: Vince Gill; Darrell Brown; LeAnn Rimes

LeAnn Rimes singles chronology
"When It's Good" (2009)	"Swingin'" (2010)	"Crazy Women" (2010)

"Swingin'" (2010)
A 30 second sample of LeAnn Rimes' "Swingin'", featuring the chorus.

LeAnn Rimes covered the song for her tenth studio album Lady & Gentlemen (2011). She co-produced it with Darrell Brown and Vince Gill. It was released to country radio on June 14, 2010, as the lead single from the album. Rimes debuted the cover at the 2010 CMT Music Awards, which aired on June 9, 2010. The song also had a music video, directed by David McClister. It was also nominated for a Grammy.

=== Commercial performance ===
"Swingin'" debuted at number 60 on the US Billboard Hot Country Songs chart the week of July 17, 2010. The following week, it reached its peak position of number 57; it stayed for three weeks in total.

=== Charts ===
Chart (2010)	Peak position
US Hot Country Songs (Billboard)	57

== Other versions ==
- Billie Jo Spears covered the song in 1983.
- The Kidsongs kids covered the song on their 1994 video "Country Sing-Along".
- Cledus T. Judd released a rap version of "Swingin" on his 1995 debut album Cledus T. Judd (No Relation). He starts off with the opening bars of John Anderson's 1983 hit, followed by Cledus saying "Let's dance!", which leads into a rap version of the song.
- "On the Swing" is a parody of "Swingin." It's on Lollipoprock 2, released in 2003.
- Colt Ford and John Anderson released a remix version of the song for the 2012 film Super Zeroes.
- The Mavericks covered the song for release as a digital download single in 2019.

== Certifications ==
Region	Certification	Certified units/sales
United States (RIAA)	Gold	1,000,000^{^}
^{‡} Sales+streaming figures based on certification alone.
