= John Anderson (singer) =

American country musician (1954–2026)

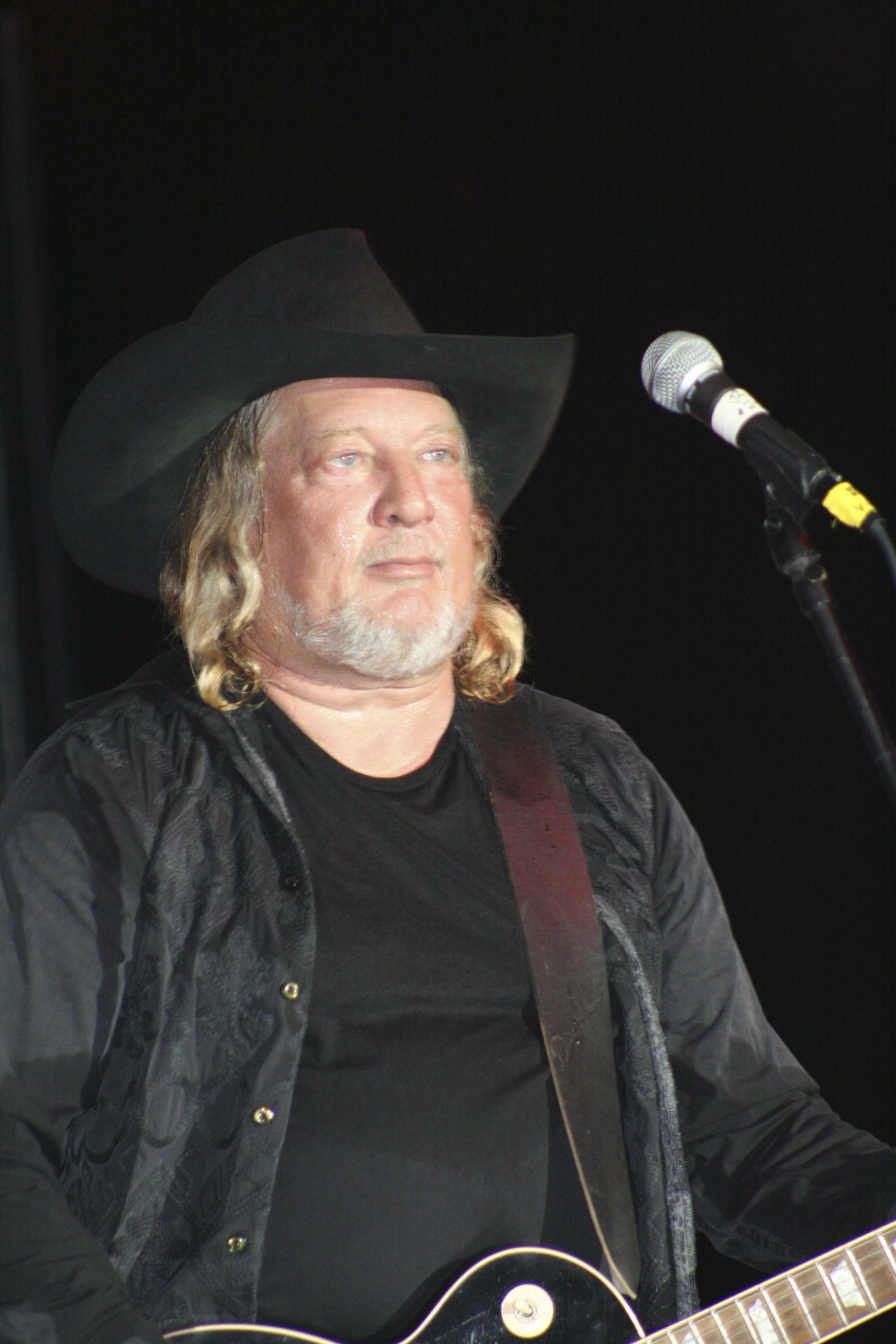
- Anderson at the Pike County Fair, 2008

Background information
- Born: John David Anderson; December 13, 1954; Apopka, Florida, U.S.
- Died: October 21, 2026 (aged 71) Smithville, Tennessee, U.S.
- Genre: Neotraditional country
- Occupations: Singer, songwriter
- Instruments: Vocals, guitar, banjo
- Years active: 1974–2026
- Labels: Warner Bros., MCA, Capitol, RCA, BNA, Mercury, Columbia, Orpheus, Blu Mountain, Warner Bros./Raybaw, Broken Bow, Easy Eye Sound
- Spouse: Jamie Addikison (m. 1983)
- Website: johnanderson.com

John David Anderson (December 13, 1954 – October 21, 2026) was an American country singer. Starting in 1977 with the release of his first single, "I've Got a Feelin' (Somebody's Been Stealin')", Anderson charted more than 40 singles on the Billboard country music charts, including five number ones: "Wild and Blue", "Swingin'", "Black Sheep", "Straight Tequila Night", and "Money in the Bank". "Seminole Wind" charted at number two. He also recorded 22 studio albums on several labels. His final album, Years, was released on April 10, 2020, on the Easy Eye Sound label and was produced by Nashville veteran producer David Ferguson and Dan Auerbach of the Black Keys.

Anderson was inducted to the Nashville Songwriters Hall of Fame on October 5, 2014. He was elected into the Country Music Hall of Fame 10 years later.

== Career ==
=== Early career (1974–1981) ===
Raised in Apopka, Florida, Anderson's first musical influences were not country artists, but rock and roll musicians such as Jimi Hendrix and the Rolling Stones. He played in a rock band Living End and the Weed Seeds until the age of 15, when he discovered the music of George Jones and Merle Haggard and turned to country music. Anderson graduated from Apopka High School in 1972, being nominated as Most Talented Senior Boy. Immediately after graduation, he moved to Nashville, Tennessee, arriving unannounced at his older sister Donna Kay Anderson's home. The two initially performed as a duo before Anderson took a solo route. He took on odd jobs during the day – including one as a roofer at the Grand Ole Opry House – while playing in clubs during the evenings.

Anderson recorded a song called “What Did I Promise Her Last Night” for a small label that soon closed. The song caught the attention of publisher Al Gallico, who helped him get a publishing deal. The club appearances finally paid off in 1977, when he signed his first recording contract with Warner Bros. Records. He first hit the Billboard country chart in 1977 with the song "I've Got a Feelin' (Somebody's Been Stealin')", then broke into the country top 40 with "The Girl at the End of the Bar" the next year. Anderson's decidedly backwoods accent and distinctive vocal timbre helped land him in the forefront of the "New Traditionalist" movement with artists such as Ricky Skaggs and George Strait.

A steady stream of singles through the late 1970s and early 1980s continued to build Anderson's name in the country genre. In 1980, Haggard invited Anderson to open for him on tour. Months later, his debut self-titled album was released on July 1, producing multiple country top 20 hits "Your Lying Blue Eyes", "She Just Started Liking Cheatin' Songs", and "1959". The latter became his first top 10 hit. His second album John Anderson 2 followed in April 1981 featuring two more top 10 hits "Chicken Truck" and "I'm Just an Old Chunk of Coal (But I'm Gonna Be a Diamond Someday)". The latter netted Anderson a Grammy Award nomination for Best Male Country Vocal Performance. I Just Came Home to Count the Memories was released his on October 14, 1981 as his third album.

=== "Swingin'" and mainstream breakthrough (1982–1986) ===
The release of Anderson's fourth album, Wild & Blue, in 1982 led to his breakthrough to mainstream country when its singles "Swingin'" and the title track hit the airwaves. Both became back-to-back number one hits on the country charts. "Swingin" broke into the country charts and reached number one by March, while at the same time crossing over to the Billboard Hot 100, reaching a peak of number 43. The single became the biggest-selling record in the history of Warner Bros. Records and was certified Gold by RIAA for selling a million copies. In the wake of "Swingin'", Anderson received five nominations for Country Music Association awards for the year. He was the winner of the Horizon Award, and the song was named Single of the Year; he also received nominations for Song of the Year, Male Vocalist of the Year, and Album of the Year.

Wild & Blue entered the mainstream Billboard 200 chart at No. 58 was certified Gold by RIAA on May 15, 1984. 1983's All the People Are Talkin' was another successful record for Anderson, producing his third number-one single "Black Sheep." Anderson's success carried on through several more albums such as 1984's Eye of a Hurricane, 1985's Tokyo, Oklahoma, and 1986's Countrified, but none would match its chart numbers or sales. By the end of 1986, Anderson and Warner Bros. parted ways.

=== Seminole Wind and Solid Ground (1990–1996) ===
After leaving Warner Bros., Anderson signed with MCA Records and released two albums under that label Blue Skies Again (1987) and 10 (1988), followed Too Tough to Tame with Capitol Records in 1989. Chart success was poor throughout those years due to poor management and label changes. That turned around in 1991, though, when Anderson joined BNA Records, and working with legendary country producer James Stroud, released the album Seminole Wind on February 10, 1992. Powered by the title single, which rose to number two, and the number-one single "Straight Tequila Night", the album provided a resurgence for Anderson's career. The album twice has been certified platinum, the highest of any of Anderson's albums, and he was nominated for three CMA Awards – Male Vocalist, Song of the Year,and Album of the Year. In October 2026, the title song was designated as the Florida state anthem.

The success of Seminole Wind brought a fresh life to Anderson's career, and he released a number of albums that charted well, producing several more singles that pushed to the upper levels of the country charts. The 1993 album Solid Ground produced a number-one single, "Money in the Bank", which turned out to be the final chart-topper of Anderson's career. Solid Ground would also be his later record to be certified Gold by RIAA on June 14, 1994. In 1993, Anderson was awarded the Academy of Country Music Career Achievement award. He participated in the 1994 CMA Album of the Year winning compilation Common Thread: The Songs of the Eagles. He recorded Country 'Til I Die (1994) and Paradise (1996) for BNA before leaving the label.

=== Later career (1997–2026) ===
Anderson recorded for several labels following his departure from BNA, with moderate chart success. 1997's Takin' the Country Back was released through PolyGram/Mercury Records, crossing over to No. 138 on the Billboard 200. He worked with Waylon Jennings on his last live album before Jennings's death in 2002, Never Say Die: The Final Concert, where he performed a duet with Jennings on the track "Waymore's Blues." In September 2003, Anderson suffered a heart attack in a Charleston hotel, forcing him to suspend his touring schedule.

He eventually moved to Columbia Records for Nobody's Got It All in 2001 before briefly returning to Warner Bros for Easy Money in 2007. This was his final Billboard 200 entry, debuting at No. 170. Anderson also worked with John Rich of Big & Rich on this record, and co-wrote Rich's 2009 single "Shuttin' Detroit Down" He was named an honorary member of the MuzikMafia, of which Rich is also a member. An album entitled Bigger Hands, a return to working with Stroud as producer, was released in June 2009. Anderson's final albums Goldmine, released through his own Bayou Boys Music imprint, and Years were released in 2015 and 2020 respectively. Blake Shelton invited Anderson to join his headlining 2019 Friends and Heroes Tour during a time he was recovering from a severe illness using Shelton's own backing band.

A tribute album Something New: A Tribute to John Anderson was released in 2022, featuring various country and Americana artists covering his catalog. Sierra Ferrell's cover of "Years" has become one of her biggest releases.

== Musical style ==
Anderson was best known as a pioneering leader of the "New Traditionalist" movement of the early 1980s. His style defined a bridge between classic country roots and a rugged, modern edge. His unique breathy, note-bending, and gravelly twang was deeply influenced by the likes of Lefty Frizzell and George Jones. Anderson infused traditional honky-tonk with a rugged "swamp-country" Southern rock edge, layering hard-driving acoustic instrumentation, prominent fiddles, and steel guitars beneath his tracks. He frequently encountered resistance from record label executives when attempting to release his self-penned material that included future hits like "Swingin'" and "Seminole Wind."

He influenced a wide range of country music artists including Luke Combs, Blake Shelton, Alan Jackson, Tim McGraw, Jason Aldean, John Rich, Eric Church, Ashley McBryde, Sturgill Simpson, Sierra Hull, and Brent Cobb.

== Personal life and death ==
John David Anderson was born in Apopka, Florida on December 13, 1954.

He married Jamie Addikison in 1983. The couple lived in Smithville, Tennessee, for more than 30 years with their two daughters.

Anderson died on October 21, 2026, at the age of 71, three days after attending the Country Music Hall of Fame induction ceremony for Tim McGraw, The Stanley Brothers, and his "I'm Still Hangin' On" songwriting partner Paul Overstreet. No cause of death was given.

== Discography ==
Studio albums

- John Anderson (1980)
- John Anderson 2 (1981)
- I Just Came Home to Count the Memories (1981)
- Wild & Blue (1982)
- All the People are Talkin' (1983)
- Eye of a Hurricane (1984)
- Tokyo, Oklahoma (1985)
- Countrified (1986)
- Blue Skies Again (1987)
- 10 (1988)
- Too Tough to Tame (1989)
- Seminole Wind (1992)
- Solid Ground (1993)
- Christmas Time (1994)
- Country 'Til I Die (1994)
- Paradise (1996)
- Takin' the Country Back (1997)
- Nobody's Got It All (2001)
- Easy Money (2007)
- Bigger Hands (2009)
- Goldmine (2015)
- Years (2020)

Billboard number-one hits

- "Wild and Blue" (2 weeks, 1982)
- "Swingin'" (1 week, 1983)
- "Black Sheep" (1 week, 1983)
- "Straight Tequila Night" (1 week, 1991-1992)
- "Money in the Bank" (1 week, 1993)

== Awards and nominations ==
=== Grammy Awards ===
Year	Nominee / work	Award	Result
1982	"I'm Just an Old Chunk of Coal (But I'm Gonna Be a Diamond Someday)"	Best Male Country Vocal Performance	Nominated

=== American Music Awards ===
Year	Nominee / work	Award	Result
1984	"Swingin'"	Favorite Country Single	Nominated

=== Academy of Country Music Awards ===
Year	Nominee / work	Award	Result
1980	John Anderson	Top New Male Vocalist	Nominated
1984	"Swingin'"	Single Record of the Year	Nominated
1984	"Swingin'"	Song of the Year	Nominated
1984	Wild & Blue	Album of the Year	Nominated
1984	John Anderson	Top Male Vocalist of the Year	Nominated
1993	John Anderson	Top Male Vocalist of the Year	Shortlisted
1993	"Straight Tequila Night"	Single Record of the Year	Nominated
1994	John Anderson	Career Achievement Award	Awarded
1994	Common Thread: The Songs of the Eagles	Album of the Year	Nominated
1995	John Anderson and Tracy Lawrence	Top Vocal Duo of the Year	Nominated

=== Country Music Association Awards ===
Year	Nominee / work	Award	Result
1982	John Anderson	Horizon Award	Nominated
1983	John Anderson	Horizon Award	Won
1983	John Anderson	Male Vocalist of the Year	Nominated
1983	"Swingin'"	Single of the Year	Won
1983	"Swingin'"	Song of the Year	Nominated
1983	Wild & Blue	Album of the Year	Nominated
1993	"Seminole Wind"	Song of the Year	Nominated
1993	"Seminole Wind"	Video of the Year	Nominated
1993	John Anderson	Male Vocalist of the Year	Nominated
1994	John Anderson	Male Vocalist of the Year	Nominated
1994	Common Thread: The Songs of the Eagles	Album of the Year	Won

== See also ==
- Academy of Country Music
- Country Music Association
- Inductees of the Country Music Hall of Fame (2024 inductee)
- List of country musicians
