= Kris Kristofferson discography =

- Studio albums: 18
- Live albums: 4
- Compilation albums: 5
- Singles: 31
- Collaboration albums: 6
- No.1 Single: 1

This is a discography for American singer-songwriter Kris Kristofferson.

== Studio albums ==
=== 1970s ===
Title	Album details	Peak chart positions				Certifications (sales thresholds)
Title	Album details	US Country	US	AUS	CAN	Certifications (sales thresholds)
Kristofferson (Note: Kristofferson was re-released in 1971 as Me and Bobby McGee)	Release date: 1970; Label: Monument Records	10	43	—	—	NZ: Gold
The Silver Tongued Devil and I	Release date: 1971; Label: Monument Records	4	21	—	22	US: Gold; NZ: Gold
Border Lord	Release date: February 1972; Label: Monument Records	6	41	—	—	
Jesus Was a Capricorn	Release date: November 1972; Label: Monument Records	1	31	—	27	US: Gold
Spooky Lady's Sideshow	Release date: May 1974; Label: Monument Records	11	78	42	53	
Who's to Bless and Who's to Blame	Release date: November 1975; Label: Monument Records	23	105	—	—	
Surreal Thing	Release date: July 1976; Label: Monument Records	17	180	—	—	
Easter Island	Release date: February 1978; Label: Monument Records	21	86	—		
Shake Hands with the Devil	Release date: July 1979; Label: Monument Records	—	—	—	—	
"—" denotes releases that did not chart

=== 1980s and 1990s ===
Title	Album details	Peak chart positions	
Title	Album details	US Country	CAN Country
To the Bone	Release date: January 1981; Label: Monument Records	—	—
Repossessed	Release date: October 1986; Label: Mercury Records	31	—
Third World Warrior	Release date: March 6, 1990; Label: Mercury Records	—	—
A Moment of Forever	Release date: August 15, 1995; Label: Justice Records	—	—
The Austin Sessions	Release date: August 24, 1999; Label: Atlantic Records	26	10
"—" denotes releases that did not chart

=== 2000s and 2010s ===
Title	Album details	Peak chart positions			
Title	Album details	US Country	US	US Indie	US Folk
This Old Road	Release date: March 7, 2006; Label: New West Records	36	172	14	—
Closer to the Bone	Release date: September 28, 2009; Label: New West Records	29	167	28	—
Feeling Mortal	Release date: January 29, 2013; Label: KK Records	28	—	38	9
The Cedar Creek Sessions	Release date: June 17, 2016; Label: KK Records	—	—	—	—
"—" denotes releases that did not chart

== Live albums ==
Title	Album details
Live at the Philharmonic	Release date: 1992; Label: Monument Records
Broken Freedom Song: Live from San Francisco	Release date: July 8, 2003; Label: Oh Boy Records
An Evening with Kris Kristofferson: The Pilgrim: Ch 77 – Union Chapel, London	Release date: September 29, 2014; Label: Virgin Records
Joni 75: A Birthday Celebration	Release date: March 8, 2019; Label: Decca Records

== Collaboration albums ==
Title	Album details	Peak chart positions			
Title	Album details	US Country	US	AUS	CAN
Full Moon (with Rita Coolidge)	Release date: September 1973; Label: A&M Records	1	26	40	7
Breakaway (with Rita Coolidge)	Release date: December 1974; Label: Monument Records	19	103	99	81
A Star Is Born (with Barbra Streisand)	Release date: November 1976; Label: Columbia Records	—	1	3	1
Natural Act (with Rita Coolidge)	Release date: December 1978; Label: A&M Records	24	106	87	—
The Winning Hand (with Dolly Parton, Willie Nelson and Brenda Lee)	Release date: December 1982; Label: Monument Records	4	109	—	—
Music from Songwriter (with Willie Nelson)	Release date: October 1984; Label: Columbia Records	21	152	—	—
"—" denotes releases that did not chart

== Compilation albums ==
Title	Album details	Peak chart positions			Certifications (sales thresholds)
Title	Album details	US Country	US	CAN	Certifications (sales thresholds)
Songs of Kristofferson	Release date: April 1977; Label: Monument Records	8	45	35	US: Gold
The Essential Kris Kristofferson	Release date: March 2, 2004; Label: Monument Records	—	—	—	
Help Me Make It Through the Night	Release date: August 16, 2004; Label: Delta No. 1	—	—	—	
Please Don't Tell Me How the Story Ends: The Publishing Demos	Release date: May 11, 2010; Label: Light in the Attic Records	61	—	—	
Playlist: The Very Best of Kris Kristofferson	Release date: October 11, 2011; Label: Columbia Records	75	—	—	
The Complete Monument & Columbia Album Collection	Release date: June 10, 2016; Label: Legacy Recordings	—	—	—	
"—" denotes releases that did not chart

== Singles ==
=== 1960s—1970s ===
Year	Single	Peak chart positions							Certifications (sales threshold)	Album
Year	Single	US Country	US	US AC	AUS	CAN Country	CAN	CAN AC	Certifications (sales threshold)	Album
1967	"Golden Idol" b/w "Killing Time"	—	—	—	—	—	—	—		non-album single/re-recorded for Surreal Thing
1970	"To Beat the Devil"	—	—	—	—	—	—	—		Kristofferson
1970	"Jody and the Kid"	—	—	—	—	—	—	—		The Silver Tongued Devil and I
1971	"Lovin' Her Was Easier (Than Anything I'll Ever Do Again)"	—	26	4	61	—	21	8		The Silver Tongued Devil and I
1972	"Josie"	70	63	—	—	—	69	—		Border Lord
1972	"Jesus Was a Capricorn"	—	91	—	—	—	87	—		Jesus Was a Capricorn
1972	"Jesse Younger"	—	—	—	—	—	—	72		Jesus Was a Capricorn
1973	"Why Me"	1	16	28	67	1	19	23	US: Gold	Jesus Was a Capricorn
1974	"I May Smoke Too Much"	—	—	—	—	—	—	—		Spooky Lady's Sideshow
1975	"Easy, Come On"	—	—	—	—	—	—	—		Who's to Bless and Who's to Blame
1975	"The Year 2000 Minus 25"	—	—	—	—	—	—	—		Who's to Bless and Who's to Blame
1976	"It's Never Gonna Be The Same Again"	—	—	—	—	—	—	—		Surreal Thing
1977	"Watch Closely Now"	—	52	—	—	—	66	—		A Star Is Born (soundtrack)
1978	"Forever in Your Love"	—	—	—	—	—	—	—		Easter Island
1979	"Prove It to You One More Time Again"	91	—	—	—	—	—	—		Shake Hands with the Devil
"—" denotes releases that did not chart

=== 1980s—2000s ===
Year	Single	Peak chart positions		Album
Year	Single	US Country	CAN Country	Album
1980	"I'll Take Any Chance I Can With You"	—	—	To the Bone
1981	"Nobody Loves Anybody Anymore"	68	—	To the Bone
1981	"Here Comes That Rainbow Again"	—	—	The Winning Hand
1982	"Put It off Until Tomorrow" (with Dolly Parton)	—	—	The Winning Hand
1984	"How Do You Feel About Foolin' Around" (with Willie Nelson)	46	35	Music From Songwriter
1986	"They Killed Him"	67	53	Repossessed
1987	"Love Is The Way"	—	—	Repossessed
1987	"El Coyote"	—	—	Repossessed
2006	"This Old Road"	—	—	This Old Road
2009	"Closer to the Bone"	—	—	Closer to the Bone
"—" denotes releases that did not chart

=== Singles with Rita Coolidge ===
Year	Single	Peak chart positions							Album
Year	Single	US Country	US	US AC	AUS	CAN Country	CAN	CAN AC	Album
1971	"The Taker"	—	—	—	—	—	—	—	The Silver Tongued Devil and I
1973	"A Song I'd Like to Sing"	92	49	12	97	54	53	3	Full Moon
1974	"Loving Arms"	98	86	25	96	—	83	9	Full Moon
1974	"Rain"	87	—	44	—	—	—	40	Breakaway
1975	"Lover Please"	—	—	42	—	—	—	—	Breakaway
1975	"We Must Have Been Out of Our Minds"	—	—	—	—	—	—	—	Breakaway
"—" denotes releases that did not chart

== Other appearances ==
=== Studio appearances ===
Year	Song	Album	Notes
1994	"All Shook Up"	Brace Yourself! A Tribute to Otis Blackwell	
1995	"Paperback Writer"	Come Together: America Salutes the Beatles	
2000	"San Francisco Mabel Joy"	Frisco Mabel Joy Revisited: A Tribute to Mickey Newbury	
2004	"Gold Watch and Chain"	The Unbroken Circle: The Musical Heritage of the Carter Family	with the Nitty Gritty Dirt Band
2007	"Far Side Banks of Jordan"	Anchored in Love: A Tribute to June Carter Cash	with Patty Loveless
2010	"The Winner"	Twistable, Turnable Man: A Musical Tribute to the Songs of Shel Silverstein	
2017	"Turpentine"	Cover Stories: Brandi Carlile Celebrates 10 Years of The Story – An Album to Benefit War Child	
2018	"Forever/I Still Miss Someone"	Forever Words	with Willie Nelson
2018	"Old Friends"	King of the Road: A Tribute to Roger Miller	with Willie Nelson and Merle Haggard

=== Guest appearances ===
Year	Song	Artist	Notes
2018	"Footlights"	Scott Joss	vocals on Merle Haggard cover
2018	"How Far to Jordan"	Scott Joss	vocals
2021	"The Lonely Night"	Moby	with Mark Lanegan

== Music videos ==
Year	Video
1986	"They Killed Him"
1987	"Love Is The Way"
2006	"Closer To The Bone"
2009	"This Old Road"
2026	"On My Way to Heaven’ with Tanya Tucker and Dennis Quaid
