= The Essential Kris Kristofferson =

Compilation album by Kris Kristofferson
- Released: March 2, 2004
- Recorded: 1969–1983
- Genre: Country
- Length: 2:07:58
- Label: Monument; Columbia; Legacy

Kris Kristofferson chronology
Broken Freedom Song: Live from San Francisco (2003)	The Essential Kris Kristofferson (2004)	This Old Road (2006)

Professional ratings
Review scores
Source	Rating
AllMusic	4.5/5 stars

The Essential Kris Kristofferson is a 37-track, 2-CD compilation and career retrospective for Kris Kristofferson.

The compilation was released in 2004 and covers the period 1969–1999, although it focuses heavily on the years 1969–1971. Disc 1 covers only this period, spotlighting tracks from his first two albums, while Disc 2 mostly covers the rest of the 1970s, with only four songs from the 1980s (including one by The Highwaymen) and one from the 1990s.

== Track listing ==
=== Disc 1 ===
	Title	Performer	Writers	Original release
1.	"Sunday Mornin' Comin' Down"	Kris Kristofferson	Kris Kristofferson	From the album Kristofferson (Monument, 1970)
2.	"To Beat the Devil"	Kris Kristofferson	Kristofferson	Kristofferson
3.	"Just the Other Side of Nowhere"	Kris Kristofferson	Kristofferson	Kristofferson
4.	"Me and Bobby McGee"	Kris Kristofferson	Kristofferson, Fred Foster	Kristofferson
5.	"The Best of All Possible Worlds"	Kris Kristofferson	Kristofferson	Kristofferson
6.	"Casey's Last Ride"	Kris Kristofferson	Kristofferson	Kristofferson
7.	"Help Me Make It Through the Night"	Kris Kristofferson	Kristofferson	Kristofferson
8.	"Darby's Castle"	Kris Kristofferson	Kristofferson	Kristofferson
9.	"Jody and the Kid"	Kris Kristofferson	Kristofferson	From the album The Silver Tongued Devil and I (Monument, 1971)
10.	"Loving Her Was Easier (Than Anything I'll Ever Do Again)"	Kris Kristofferson	Kristofferson	The Silver Tongued Devil and I
11.	"For the Good Times"	Kris Kristofferson	Kristofferson	Kristofferson
12.	"Come Sundown"	Kris Kristofferson	Kristofferson	From the reissue of Kristofferson (Monument/Legacy, 2001; recorded 1969)
13.	"From the Bottle to the Bottom"	Kris Kristofferson	Kristofferson	From the album Singer/Songwriter (Sony, 1991; recorded 1971)
14.	"Billy Dee"	Kris Kristofferson	Kristofferson	The Silver Tongued Devil and I
15.	"Breakdown (A Long Way from Home)"	Kris Kristofferson	Kristofferson	The Silver Tongued Devil and I
16.	"The Silver Tongued Devil and I"	Kris Kristofferson	Kristofferson	The Silver Tongued Devil and I
17.	"The Taker"	Kris Kristofferson	Kristofferson, Shel Silverstein	The Silver Tongued Devil and I
18.	"The Pilgrim: Chapter 33" (live)	Kris Kristofferson	Kristofferson	From the live festival album Big Sur Festival/One Hand Clapping (Various artists, Columbia, 1972)

=== Disc 2 ===
	Title	Performer	Writers	Original release
1.	"Border Lord"	Kris Kristofferson	Kristofferson, Stephen Bruton, Donnie Fritts, Terry Paul	From the album Border Lord (Monument, 1972)
2.	"The Sabre and the Rose"	Kris Kristofferson	Kristofferson	From the album Easter Island (Monument, 1978)
3.	"Broken Freedom Song"	Kris Kristofferson	Kristofferson	From the album Spooky Lady's Sideshow (Monument, 1974)
4.	"Jesus Was a Capricorn (Owed to John Prine)"	Kris Kristofferson	Kristofferson	From the album Jesus Was a Capricorn (Monument, 1972)
5.	"Shandy (The Perfect Disguise)"	Kris Kristofferson	Kristofferson	Spooky Lady's Sideshow
6.	"Sugar Man"	Kris Kristofferson	Kristofferson	Jesus Was a Capricorn
7.	"The Last Time"	Kris Kristofferson	Kristofferson	From the album To the Bone (Monument, 1981)
8.	"Nobody Wins"	Kris Kristofferson	Kristofferson	Jesus Was a Capricorn
9.	"I'd Rather Be Sorry"	Kris Kristofferson & Rita Coolidge	Kristofferson	From the album Breakaway (Kris Kristofferson & Rita Coolidge, Monument, 1974)
10.	"Highwayman"	The Highwaymen (Kris Kristofferson, Waylon Jennings, Willie Nelson & Johnny Cash)	Jimmy Webb	From the album Highwayman (The Highwaymen, Columbia, 1985)
11.	"Don't Cuss the Fiddle"	Kris Kristofferson	Kristofferson	From the album Who's to Bless and Who's to Blame (Monument, 1975)
12.	"The Bigger the Fool, the Harder the Fall"	Kris Kristofferson	Kristofferson, Bruton, Michael Utley	Easter Island
13.	"Stranger"	Kris Kristofferson	Kristofferson	Who's to Bless and Who's to Blame
14.	"If You Don't Like Hank Williams"	Kris Kristofferson	Kristofferson	From the album Surreal Thing (Monument, 1976)
15.	"Here Comes that Rainbow Again"	Kris Kristofferson	Kristofferson	From the album The Winning Hand (Kris Kristofferson, Willie Nelson, Dolly Parton & Brenda Lee, Monument, 1982)
16.	"Once More with Feeling"	Kris Kristofferson	Kristofferson, Silverstein	From the album Shake Hands with the Devil (Monument, 1979)
17.	"How Do You Feel About Foolin' Around"	Kris Kristofferson & Willie Nelson	Kristofferson, Bruton, Utley	From the soundtrack album Music from Songwriter (Kris Kristofferson & Willie Nelson, Columbia, 1984)
18.	"Why Me"	Kris Kristofferson	Kristofferson	Jesus Was a Capricorn
19.	"Please Don't Tell Me How the Story Ends"	Kris Kristofferson	Kristofferson	From the album The Austin Sessions (Atlantic, 1999)
