= The Complete Monument & Columbia Album Collection =

Box set by Kris Kristofferson
- Released: June 10, 2016
- Recorded: 1967–1993
- Genre: Country
- Label: Legacy/Columbia
- Producer: Fred Foster

Kris Kristofferson chronology
Feeling Mortal (2013)	The Complete Monument & Columbia Album Collection (2016)	The Cedar Creek Sessions (2016)

The Complete Monument & Columbia Album Collection is a box set by country singer/songwriter Kris Kristofferson, released in 2016 by Columbia Records and Legacy Recordings.

The set consists of 16 CDs, majority of which are reissues of albums released by Kristofferson during his 1970-1984 tenure with Monument Records. It features all of his 10 studio albums from that period, along with a duet album recorded with Rita Coolidge. Each CD is packaged in a replica of the original LP cover, with albums originally issued as two-LP set condensed into a single disc. Additional content consists of three live records (two of them previously unreleased), demos and a bonus disc called 'Extras', compiling non-album tracks and duets taken from other albums. For example, every Kristofferson song from The Winning Hand and Music from Songwriter list included there.

The CD set also includes a booklet featuring newly written essays and liner notes by Fred Foster, Don Was and Mikal Gilmore.

Alongside the CD version, digital download versions of the content were published (all songs/albums individually as well as the complete set containing all 16 albums).

== Album list ==
1. Kristofferson (1970)
2. The Silver Tongued Devil and I (1971)
3. Border Lord (1972)
4. Jesus Was a Capricorn (1972)
5. Spooky Lady's Sideshow (1974)
6. Breakaway - Kris Kristofferon & Rita Coolidge (1974)
7. Who's to Bless and Who's to Blame (1975)
8. Surreal Thing (1976)
9. Easter Island (1978)
10. Shake Hands with the Devil (1979)
11. To the Bone (1981)
12. Live At The Big Sur Folk Festival (recorded 1970, previously unreleased)
13. The WPLJ-FM Broadcast (recorded 1972, previously unreleased)
14. Live at the Philharmonic (recorded 1972/released 1992)
15. Extras (previously released non-LP singles, outtakes and appearances)
16. Demos (previously unreleased)

== Track listing ==
Track listings from the previously unreleased CDs.

Disc 12: Live At The Big Sur Folk Festival
No.	Title	Length
1.	"If You Don't Like Hank Williams"	2:10
2.	"The Law Is for Protection of the People"	3:29
3.	"Band Introduction"	1:29
4.	"The Pilgrim, Chapter 33"	3:26
5.	"Duvalier's Dream"	2:53
6.	"Help Me Make It Through the Night"	3:01
7.	"Shake Hands With the Devil"	2:50
8.	"To Beat the Devil"	4:43
9.	"Loving Her Was Easier (Than Anything I'll Ever Do Again)"	3:35
10.	"Sunday Mornin' Comin' Down"	4:46
11.	"Me and Bobby McGee"	4:48

Disc 13: The WPLJ-FM Broadcast
No.	Title	Length
1.	"Duvalier's Dream"	2:55
2.	"When I Loved Her"	3:24
3.	"Jesus Was a Capricorn"	2:16
4.	"Same Old Song"	3:17
5.	"Band Introduction"	2:24
6.	"Smile at Me Again"	2:40
7.	"Loving Her Was Easier (Than Anything I'll Ever Do Again)"	3:43
8.	"Casey's Last Ride"	3:55
9.	"Billy Dee"	2:50
10.	"The Law Is for Protection of the People"	2:26
11.	"Sunday Mornin' Comin' Down"	3:02
12.	"Help Me Make It Through the Night"	2:55

Disc 15: Extras
No.	Title	Original Release	Length
1.	"The Golden Idol"	Golden Idol (1967) Single A-Side	2:23
2.	"Killing Time"	Golden Idol (1967) Single B-Side	2:31
3.	"Hello In There (Live) with Joan Baez"	(Recorded live at the Big Sur Folk Festival 1971)	3:33
4.	"The Junkie and the Juicehead, Minus Me"	Kristofferson re-release bonus track	3:24
5.	"Shadows of Her Mind"	Kristofferson re-release bonus track	3:12
6.	"The Lady's Not for Sale"	Kristofferson re-release bonus track	3:28
7.	"From the Bottle to the Bottom"	recorded 1971, first released on 1991 album Singer/Songwriter	3:00
8.	"The Bandits of Beverly Hills"	The Winning Hand	2:28
9.	"Here Comes That Rainbow Again"	The Winning Hand	2:55
10.	"The Bigger the Fool (The Harder the Fall) with Brenda Lee"	The Winning Hand	3:45
11.	"Help Me Make It Through the Night with Brenda Lee"	The Winning Hand	3:50
12.	"Born to Love Me with Brenda Lee"	The Winning Hand	4:22
13.	"Put It Off Until Tomorrow with Dolly Parton"	The Winning Hand	2:28
14.	"Ping Pong with Dolly Parton"	The Winning Hand	2:22
15.	"Casey's Last Ride with Willie Nelson"	The Winning Hand	4:10
16.	"To Make a Long Story Short, She's Gone with Willie Nelson"	The Winning Hand	3:08
17.	"How Do You Feel About Foolin' Around with Willie Nelson"	Music from Songwriter	2:48
18.	"Eye of the Storm with Willie Nelson"	Music from Songwriter	3:18
19.	"Crossing the Border"	Music from Songwriter	5:17
20.	"Down to Her Socks"	Music from Songwriter	2:55
21.	"Under the Gun"	Music from Songwriter	6:35
22.	"The Final Attraction"	Music from Songwriter	3:39
23.	"I'll Be Your Baby Tonight (Remastered)"	Bob Dylan - The 30th Anniversary Concert Celebration	3:08

Disc 16: Demos
No.	Title	Length
1.	"Gypsy Rose and I Don't Give a Curse (Demo)"	3:07
2.	"I Believe That I Believe (Demo)"	2:44
3.	"Born to Die Alone (Demo)"	2:23
4.	"The Hurricane and the Helicopter (Demo)"	2:20
5.	"Bread for the Body (And Food for the Soul) (Demo)"	2:47
6.	"I Can Be Had (Demo)"	2:33
7.	"The Table, The Glass, The Wine (Demo)"	2:17
8.	"A Stitch in the Hand (Demo)"	2:23
9.	"File It Under Sick and Wrong (Demo)"	2:24
10.	"Where She Stops Nobody Knows (Demo)"	3:22
11.	"Lonesome Way of Dying (Demo)"	2:45
12.	"Good for Nothing Blues (Demo)"	2:18
13.	"Fallen Woman (Demo)"	2:43
14.	"No One's Gonna Miss Me (Demo)"	2:58
15.	"Hitting Close to Home (Demo)"	2:38
16.	"Nobody Owns My Soul (Demo)"	3:01
