= Live at the Philharmonic =

Live album by Kris Kristofferson
- Released: 1992
- Recorded: December 2, 1972
- Venue: Philharmonic Hall, New York City
- Genre: Country
- Length: 67:22
- Label: Monument
- Producer: Fred Foster

Kris Kristofferson chronology
| Third World Warrior (1990) | Live at the Philharmonic (1992) | A Moment of Forever (1995) |

Professional ratings
Review scores
| Source | Rating |
|---|---|
| Allmusic | 4/5 stars |

Live at the Philharmonic is a live album by Kris Kristofferson, released on Monument Records in 1992 (see 1992 in music). Performed at Philharmonic Hall in New York City on December 2, 1972, the concert followed the release of Kristofferson's successful Jesus Was a Capricorn. Aside from several songs from the latter, the singer performed a number of new pieces, as well as a few of his well-known hits such as "Sunday Mornin' Comin' Down" and "Me and Bobby McGee". Guest artists included Willie Nelson, who was a little-known personality in country music at the time, Rita Coolidge, Kristofferson's future wife, and Larry Gatlin, whose career was in its starting phases.

== Track listing ==
1. "Late John Garfield Blues" (John Prine) – 2:53
2. "Jesus Was a Capricorn" (Kristofferson) – 1:58
3. "Nobody Wins" (Kristofferson) – 5:40
4. "Jesse Younger" (Kristofferson) – 2:35
5. "Loving Her Was Easier (Than Anything I'll Ever Do Again)" (Kristofferson) – 3:37
6. "Late Again (Gettin' over You)" (Kristofferson) – 3:39
7. "Out of Mind, Out of Sight" (Kristofferson, Stephen Bruton) – 3:02
8. "Sugar Man" (Kristofferson) – 3:48
9. "Billy Dee" (Kristofferson) – 2:38
10. "The Law is for the Protection of the People" (Kristofferson) – 2:25
11. "For the Good Times" (Kristofferson) – 2:17
12. "Sunday Mornin' Comin' Down" (Kristofferson) – 2:51
13. "Okie from Muskogee" (Merle Haggard, Roy Edward Burris) – 2:06
14. "Border Lord" (Kristofferson, Bruton, Donnie Fritts) – 3:57
15. "Funny How Time Slips Away/"Night Life" (Willie Nelson) – 5:20
16. "Me and Paul" (Nelson) – 2:49
17. "Mountain Dew" (Bascom Lamar Lunsford, Scotty Wiseman) – 2:39
18. "The Pilgrim, Chapter 33" (Kristofferson) – 3:04
19. "Rainbow Road" (Donnie Fritts, Dan Penn) – 3:17
20. "It Sure Was (Love)" (Kristofferson) – 3:36
21. "Help Me" (Larry Gatlin) – 3:56
22. "Me and Bobby McGee" (Kristofferson, Fred Foster) – 5:32
23. "Whiskey, Whiskey" (Tom Ghent) – 3:49

== Personnel ==
- Kris Kristofferson - rhythm guitar, vocals
- Stephen Bruton - lead guitar
- Terry Paul - bass
- Donnie Fritts - keyboards
- Mike Utley - organ
- Sammy Creason - drums
