= This Old Road =

Studio album by Kris Kristofferson
- Released: March 7, 2006
- Genre: Country
- Length: 37:15
- Label: New West
- Producer: Don Was

Kris Kristofferson chronology
The Essential Kris Kristofferson (2004)	This Old Road (2006)	Closer to the Bone (2009)

Professional ratings
Review scores
Source	Rating
Allmusic	3.5/5 stars
Rolling Stone	3.5/5 stars
The Village Voice	(dud)

This Old Road is an album by Kris Kristofferson, released in 2006 on New West Records. The underlying theme of the record is a retrospective and reflective look at what Kristofferson deems to have been important elements of his life.

It was his first album of new material since 1995's A Moment of Forever, which was also produced by Don Was. Kristofferson re-recorded three of his songs for the album. The original recording of "This Old Road" was released on Repossessed, "The Final Attraction" appeared on Music from Songwriter and the original version of "The Burden of Freedom" appeared on Border Lord.

== Critical reception ==
Allmusic's Thom Jurek gave the album three-and-a-half out of five stars and called it a "welcome comeback" for Kristofferson, who he felt had improved "considerably" as a singer: "Kristofferson is dead-on here, razor-sharp, economical in his language, and to the bone in his insight." By contrast, Robert Christgau of The Village Voice graded it a "dud", indicating "a bad record whose details rarely merit further thought."

== Track listing ==
All songs written by Kris Kristofferson.

1. "This Old Road" – 3:59
2. "Pilgrim's Progress" – 2:14
3. "The Last Thing to Go" – 2:59
4. "Wild American" – 2:26
5. "In the News" – 3:30
6. "The Burden of Freedom" – 3:25
7. "Chase the Feeling" – 4:06
8. "Holy Creation" – 4:37
9. "The Show Goes On" – 3:19
10. "Thank You for a Life" – 3:44
11. "Final Attraction" – 2:56

== Personnel ==
- Kris Kristofferson - acoustic guitar (1–11), lead vocals (1–11), harmonica (1, 3, 6, 7, 9, 11)
- Steve Bruton - mandolin (1), acoustic guitar (3, 7, 9, 11), backing vocals (1–3, 7, 9, 11)
- Don Was - acoustic bass (1, 3, 7, 11), piano (1)
- Jim Keltner - drums (1, 7)

== Chart performance ==
Chart performance for This Old Road
Chart (2006)	Peak position
US Billboard 200	172
US Independent Albums (Billboard)	14
US Top Country Albums (Billboard)	36
