= Shake Hands with the Devil =

Shake Hands with the Devil may refer to:

- Shake Hands with the Devil (1959 film), American drama set in 1921 Ireland
- Shake Hands with the Devil (album), Kris Kristofferson 1979 release on Monument Records
- Shake Hands with the Devil (book), 2003 memoir of Rwandan genocide by Canadian general Roméo Dallaire
- Shake Hands With the Devil: The Journey of Roméo Dallaire, 2004 Canadian documentary film based on Dallaire's book
- Shake Hands with the Devil (2007 film), Canadian docudrama adapted from Dallaire's book
