= The Austin Sessions (Kris Kristofferson album) =

Studio album by Kris Kristofferson
- Released: August 24, 1999
- Genre: Country
- Length: 47:16
- Label: Atlantic
- Producer: Fred Mollin

Kris Kristofferson chronology
| A Moment of Forever (1995) | The Austin Sessions (1999) | Broken Freedom Song: Live from San Francisco (2003) |

Professional ratings
Review scores
| Source | Rating |
|---|---|
| AllMusic | 3/5 stars |

The Austin Sessions is a studio album by Kris Kristofferson, released on Atlantic Records in 1999. It features stripped-down versions of Kristofferson's most famous material, including "Me and Bobby McGee", "Sunday Mornin' Comin' Down" and "Help Me Make It Through the Night". Several well-known artists contributed vocals to the album, including Steve Earle, Jackson Browne, Matraca Berg, Vince Gill, Marc Cohn, Alison Krauss, Catie Curtis and Mark Knopfler.

== Track listing ==
All tracks written by Kris Kristofferson except where noted.

1. "Me and Bobby McGee" (Kristofferson, Fred Foster) – 4:31
2. "Sunday Mornin' Comin' Down" – 5:20
3. "For the Good Times" – 3:59
4. "The Silver Tongued Devil and I" – 3:37
5. "Help Me Make It Through the Night" – 4:10
6. "Loving Her Was Easier (Than Anything I'll Ever Do Again)" – 5:18
7. "To Beat the Devil" – 4:30
8. "Who's to Bless and Who's to Blame" – 3:29
9. "Why Me" – 2:58
10. "Nobody Wins" – 4:05
11. "The Pilgrim, Chapter 33" – 2:41
12. "Please Don't Tell Me How the Story Ends" – 2:38

== Personnel ==
- Kris Kristofferson – vocals, acoustic guitar, harmonica
- Mike Baird – drums
- Matraca Berg – harmony vocals
- Jackson Browne – harmony vocals
- Stephen Bruton – mandolin
- Marc Cohn – harmony vocals
- Jim Cox – keyboards, accordion
- Catie Curtis – harmony vocals
- Steve Earle – harmony vocals
- Paul Franklin – steel guitar
- Vince Gill – harmony vocals
- Alison Krauss – harmony vocals
- Fred Mollin – harmonica, bass drum, 12-string guitar
- Larry Paxton – bass, guitar, mandolin
- Joe Spivey – fiddle
- John Willis – acoustic guitar, electric guitar, slide guitar, resonator guitar
- Mark Linett – recording engineer

== Charts ==
Chart performance for The Austin Sessions
| Chart (1999) | Peak position |
|---|---|
| Canada Country Albums (RPM) | 10 |
| US Top Country Albums (Billboard) | 26 |
