= Sweet Thing (1999 film) =

- Directed by: Mark David
- Written by: Mark David; Mark Spacek
- Starring: Jeremy Fox; Amalia Stifter; Ev Lunning Jr.; Lana Dieterich; Michael Dalmon; Tim Curry Sr.
- Cinematography: Levy Castleberry; Mark David; Marc Wiskemann
- Edited by: Mark David; Jay Duplass
- Music by: Mark David; William Tabanou
- Production company: Jam Pictures
- Release date: June 6, 1999 (Seattle International Film Festival)
- Running time: 115 minutes
- Country: United States
- Language: English

Sweet Thing is a 1999 American drama film directed by Mark David, starring Jeremy Fox, Amalia Stifter, Ev Lunning Jr., Lana Dieterich, Michael Dalmon and Tim Curry Sr..

== Cast ==
- Jeremy Fox as Sean Fields
  - Evan Greenwalt as Young Sean Fields
- Amalia Stifter as Hannah
- Ev Lunning Jr. as Judge Ray Fields
- Lana Dieterich as Vivian Fields
- Michael Dalmon as Weiss
- Tim Curry Sr. as Solomon Bordreaux
- Stephen Bruton as Davey

== Release ==
The film premiered at the Seattle International Film Festival on 6 June 1999.

== Reception ==
Merle Bertrand of Film Threat called the film "provocative and gorgeous to look at" yet "sullen and sluggish". Eddie Cockrell of Variety wrote that the "fine work" of Fox, Curry and Bruton are "undercut" by "unfocused" castmates and David's "ambitious scope".

TV Guide wrote that the film's "febrile subject matter is so dully dramatized that only the most determined viewer will make it to the final revelations." Sarah Hepola of The Austin Chronicle called the film "all splash and flash and unfortunately, little else". Chris Riemenschneider of the Austin American-Statesman wrote that the film "depresses and numbs more than it opens any cans of worms".
