= Kris Kristofferson filmography =

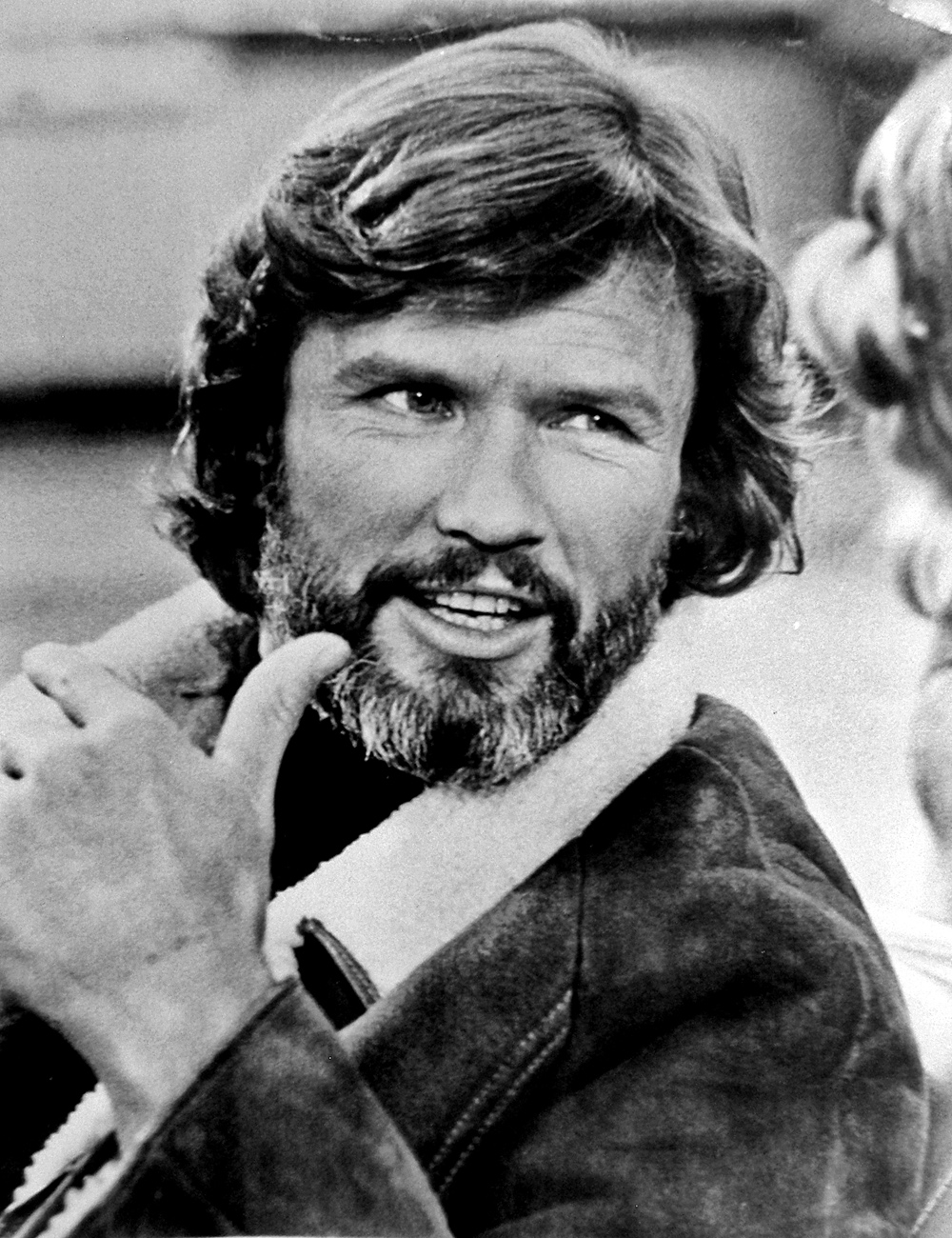
Kristofferson in 1978

American singer-songwriter and actor Kris Kristofferson has been in numerous films, television films, television series and video games. He started acting in the 1970s, appearing in the films The Last Movie (1971), Cisco Pike (1972), Pat Garrett and Billy the Kid (1973), Blume in Love (1973), Alice Doesn't Live Here Anymore (1974), Bring Me the Head of Alfredo Garcia (1974) and Vigilante Force (1976), before starring in the 1976 film A Star Is Born as John Norman Howard, which earned him a Golden Globe Award for Best Actor - Motion Picture Musical or Comedy. He went on to co-star in Stagecoach (1986) and star in films such as Semi-Tough (1977), Convoy (1978), Heaven's Gate (1980), Flashpoint (1984), Big Top Pee-wee (1988), and Welcome Home (1989).

In the 1990s, Kristofferson played Jericho in the 1991 film Miracle in the Wilderness and he played Gabriel in the 1993 film Knights with Lance Henriksen and as Charlie Wade in the 1996 film Lone Star with Matthew McConaughey. He was then cast as Abraham Whistler in the 1998 vampire superhero action film Blade, a role he later reprised in Blade II (2002) and Blade: Trinity (2004). During that time, he also portrayed Karubi (Daena's father) in Planet of the Apes (2001), and Older Billy Coleman in Where the Red Fern Grows (2003). In 2005, he appeared in The Jacket with Adrien Brody, a year later he was in Fast Food Nation with Patricia Arquette and lent his voice as the narrator to the 2007 film I'm Not There. He joined the ensemble cast in the 2009 romantic comedy He's Just Not That Into You alongside Jennifer Aniston. He played Reed Haskett in the 2011 film Dolphin Tale and again in the sequel, Dolphin Tale 2 (2014). Angels Sing 2014 on Angel Network.

Kristofferson's television work includes the television films Freedom Road (1979), and Blood & Orchids (1986); the miniseries Amerika (1987) and Lives of the Saints (2004); the television series Dead Man's Gun (1997–1999); and playing U.S. President Andrew Jackson in the historical miniseries Texas Rising (2015).

== Film ==
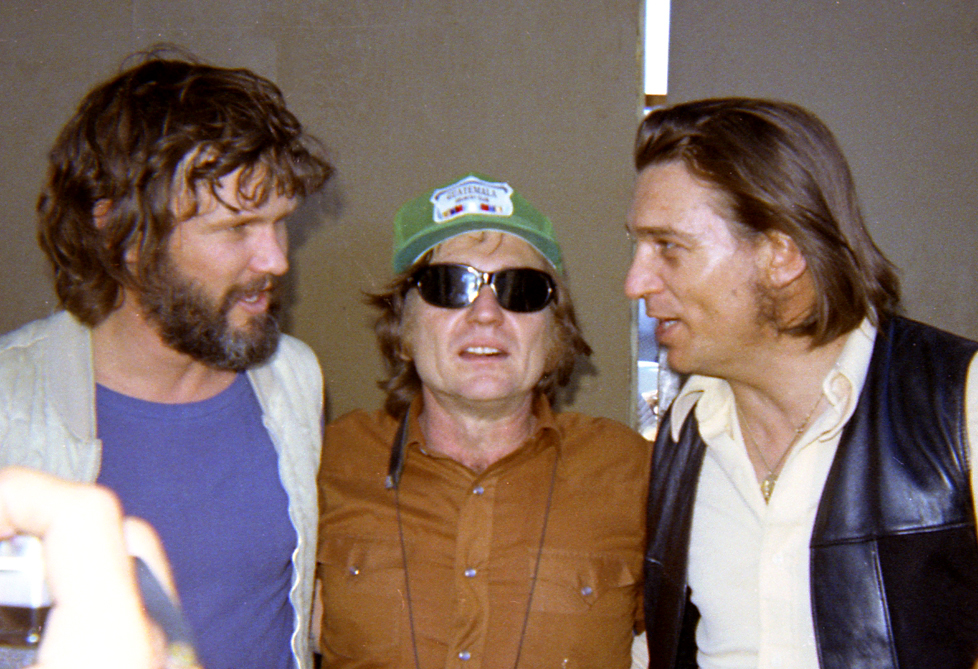
Kristofferson (left) with Willie Nelson and Waylon Jennings in March 1972

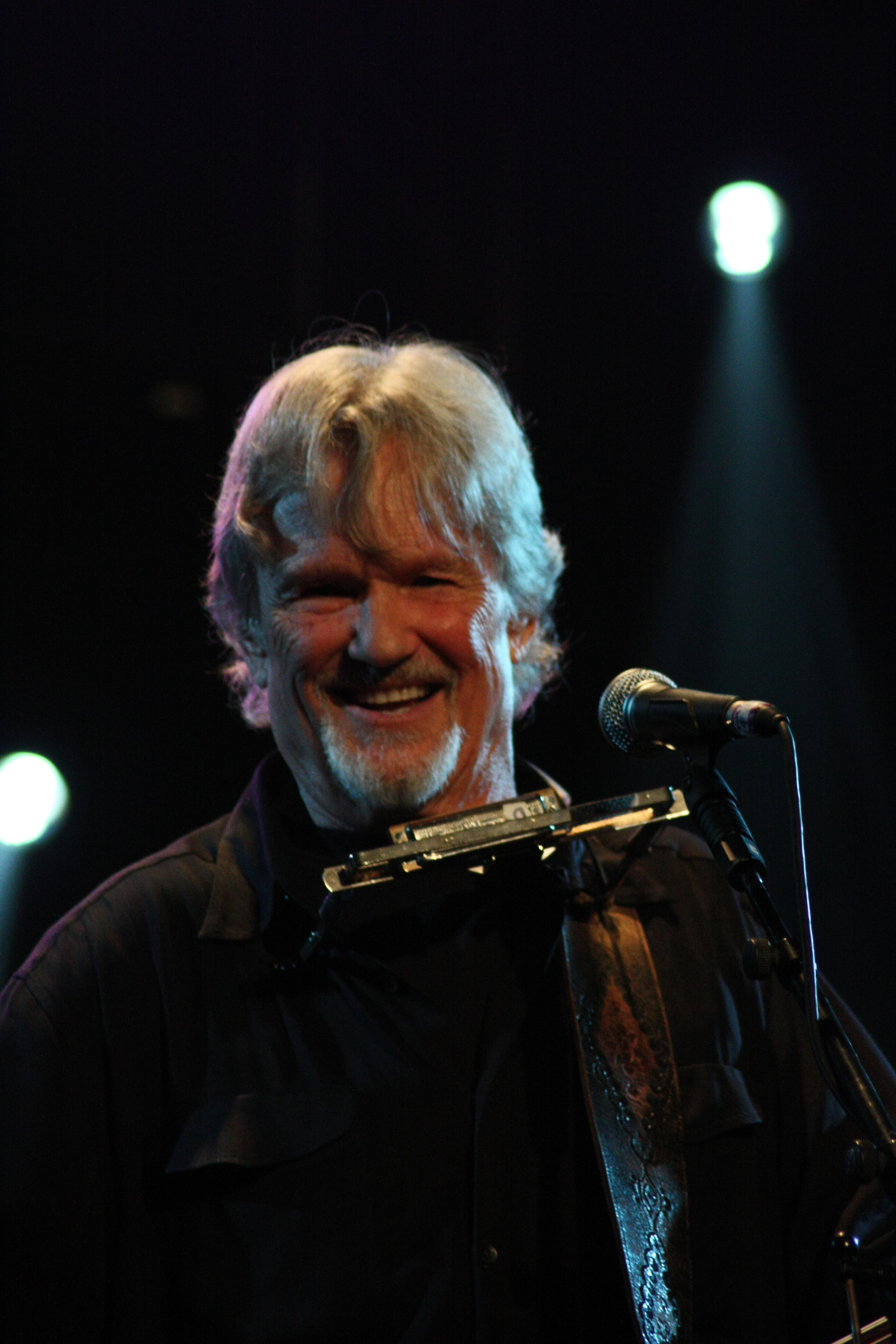
Kristofferson at the 2010 Cambridge Folk Festival

Year	Film	Role	Notes
1971	The Last Movie	The Minstrel Wrangler	
1972	Cisco Pike	Cisco Pike	
1973	The Gospel Road: A Story of Jesus	Vocalist	
1973	Pat Garrett and Billy the Kid	Billy the Kid	
1973	Blume in Love	Elmo Cole	
1974	Bring Me the Head of Alfredo Garcia	The Biker	
1974	Alice Doesn't Live Here Anymore	David	
1976	The Sailor Who Fell from Grace with the Sea	Jim Cameron	
1976	Vigilante Force	Aaron Arnold	
1976	A Star Is Born	John Norman Howard	
1977	Semi-Tough	Marvin "Shake" Tiller	
1978	Convoy	Martin "Rubber Duck" Penwald	
1980	Heaven's Gate	James Averill	
1981	Rollover	Hubbell Smith	
1982	The Last Horror Film	Himself	Uncredited
1984	Flashpoint	Bobby Logan	
1984	Songwriter	"Blackie" Buck	
1985	Trouble in Mind	John "Hawk" Hawkins	
1988	Big Top Pee-wee	Mace Montana	
1989	Millennium	Bill Smith	
1989	Welcome Home	Jake	
1990	Sandino	Tom Holte	
1991	Miracle in the Wilderness	Jericho	
1991	Night of the Cyclone	Stanley "Stan"	
1992	Original Intent	Jack Saunders	
1993	No Place to Hide	Joe Garvey	
1993	Paper Hearts	Tom	
1993	Knights	Gabriel The Cyborg	
1995	Pharaoh's Army	Confederate Preacher	
1996	Lone Star	Charlie Wade	
1997	Fire Down Below	Orin Hanner Sr.	
1998	Girls' Night	Cody	
1998	Blade	Abraham Whistler	
1998	Dance with Me	John Burnett	
1998	A Soldier's Daughter Never Cries	Bill Willis	
1998	The Land Before Time VI: The Secret of Saurus Rock	Doc	Voice, direct-to-video
1999	Payback	Bronson	
1999	Molokai: The Story of Father Damien	Rudolph Meyer	
1999	Limbo	Jack "Smilin' Jack" Johannson	
1999	The Joyriders	Eddie	
2000	Comanche	Sergeant Sam Winchester	
2001	Planet of the Apes	Karubi	
2001	Chelsea Walls	Bud	
2001	Wooly Boys	Shuck	
2002	D-Tox	Dr. John "Doc" Mitchell	
2002	Blade II	Abraham Whistler	
2003	Where the Red Fern Grows	Older Billy Coleman	
2004	Silver City	Wes Benteen	
2004	Forever Is a Long, Long Time	Hank Williams	Short film, direct-to-video
2004	Blade: Trinity	Abraham Whistler	
2005	The Jacket	Dr. Thomas Becker	
2005	The Life and Hard Times of Guy Terrifico	Himself	
2005	The Wendell Baker Story	L. R. Nasher	
2005	Dreamer	"Pop" Crane	
2006	Brats: Our Journey Home	The Narrator	Voice
2006	Disappearances	William "Quebec Bill" Bonhomme Sr.	
2006	Fast Food Nation	Rudy Martin	
2006	Room 10	Howard Davis	Short film
2006	Payback: Straight Up	Bronson	Direct-to-video
2006	Requiem for Billy the Kid	Billy the Kid	
2007	Crossing the Heart	Ray	Short film
2007	I'm Not There	The Narrator	Voice
2008	Jump Out Boys	Raymond	
2008	Snow Buddies	Talon	Voice, direct-to-video
2009	John Rich: Shuttin' Detroit Down	John	Short film, direct-to-video
2009	He's Just Not That Into You	Ken Murphy	
2009	Powder Blue	Randall	
2009	For Sale by Owner	Ferlin Smith	
2010	Bloodworth	E. F. Bloodworth	
2010	The Last Rites of Ransom Pride	Shepherd Graves	
2010	Yohan: The Child Wanderer	Old Yohan	
2011	Dolphin Tale	Reed Haskett	
2011	The Greening of Whitney Brown	Dustin "Dusty" Brown	
2012	Joyful Noise	Bernard Sparrow	
2012	Deadfall	Chester "Chet" Mills	
2012	The Motel Life	Earl Hurley	
2013	Angels Sing	The Colonel	
2013	Midnight Stallion	Jack Shepard	
2014	San Patricios	Boss Flood	
2014	Dolphin Tale 2	Reed Haskett	
2014	7 Minutes	"Mr. B"	
2014	The Winding Stream: The Carters, the Cashes and the Course of Country Music	Himself	Documentary
2016	Traded	Billy	
2016	The Red Maple Leaf	John Francis Marshall	
2017	Hickok	George Knox	
2017	The Star	Old Donkey	Voice
2017	Abilene	George Knox	
2018	Blaze	Edwin Fuller	Final role

== Television ==
Year	Film	Role	Notes
1976	Saturday Night Live	Host	Episode: "Kris Kristofferson / Rita Coolidge"
1978	The Muppet Show	Guest	Episode 1 Season 3: "Kris Kristofferson / Rita Coolidge"
1979	Freedom Road	Abner Lait	Television film
1984	The Lost Honor of Kathryn Beck	Ben Cole	Television film
1986	The Last Days of Frank and Jesse James	Jesse James	Television film
1986	Blood & Orchids	Captain Curtis "Curt" Maddox	Television film
1986	Stagecoach	Ringo / "Ringo Kid" / Bill Williams	Television film
1987	Amerika	Devin Milford	Miniseries (6 episodes)
1988	The Tracker	Noble Adams	Television film
1990	Pair of Aces	"Rip" Metcalf	Television film
1991	Another Pair of Aces: Three of a Kind	"Rip" Metcalf	Television film
1992	Miracle in the Wilderness	Jericho Adams	Television film
1992	Christmas in Connecticut	Jefferson Jones	Television film
1993	Trouble Shooters: Trapped Beneath the Earth	Stan Mather	Television film
1994	Sodbusters	Destiny	Television film
1994	The Larry Sanders Show	Himself	Episode: "Arthur's Crises"
1995	Big Dreams and Broken Hearts: The Dottie West Story	Himself	Television film
1995	Tad	President Abraham Lincoln	Television film
1995	Inflammable	Captain Jack Guthrie	Television film
1995	Brothers' Destiny	Davis	Television film
1996	Blue Rodeo	Owen Whister	Television film
1997–1999	Dead Man's Gun	The Narrator	TV series (41 episodes)
1998	Two for Texas	Hugh Allison	Television film
1999	The Long Kill	Jesse Ray Torrance	Television film
1999	NetForce	Steve Day	Television film
2000	Perfect Murder, Perfect Town	Lou Smit	Television film
2003	The Break	"Izzy" Patterson	Television film
2004	Lives of the Saints	Matthew Bok	Miniseries
2005	14 Hours	Chuck Whortle	Television film
2009	Handy Manny	Pops	Voice, episode: "Motorcycle Adventure"
2015	Down Dog	Jimmy Wood	Television film
2015	Texas Rising	President Andrew Jackson	Miniseries (4 episodes)

== Video games ==
Year	Game	Voice role	Notes
2005	Gun	Ned White	
2010	Fallout: New Vegas	Chief Hanlon	

== See also ==
- Kris Kristofferson discography
