= Please Don't Tell Me How the Story Ends: The Publishing Demos =

Please Don't Tell Me How The Story Ends: The Publishing Demos

Studio album by Kris Kristofferson
- Released: 2010
- Recorded: 1968–1972
- Genre: Country
- Length: 32:49
- Label: Light in the Attic Records
- Producer: Mark Linn and Matt Sullivan

Kris Kristofferson chronology
| Closer to the Bone (2009) | Please Don't Tell Me How The Story Ends: The Publishing Demos (2010) | Feeling Mortal (2013) |

Please Don't Tell Me How The Story Ends: The Publishing Demos is the first release of the demos recorded by Kris Kristofferson between 1968 and 1972 while working as a janitor at Columbia Records. Many of the songs would be rerecorded on later Kristofferson albums or by other artists including Janis Joplin, Al Green, and Johnny Cash.

"We dusted 'em off, and it was a lot of fun hooking up with my old band members," said Kristofferson. "Did you see Dennis Hopper sent me a telegram for the booklet? It reminded me of the good times we had when music was all that mattered… I'd had five years of intense songwriting and pitching in Nashville, trying to find singers who'd buy my stuff and publishers to finance 'em."

== Track listing ==
All songs by Kris Kristofferson except where noted.

1. "Me and Bobby Mcgee (Fred Foster, Kristofferson)"
2. "Please Don't Tell Me How the Story Ends"
3. "Smile At Me Again"
4. "The Lady's Not For Sale"
5. "Border Lord"
6. "Just The Other Side Of Nowhere"
7. "Come Sundown"
8. "Slow Down"
9. "If You Don't Like Hank Williams"
10. "Little Girl Lost"
11. "Duvalier's Dream"
12. "When I Loved Her"
13. "Billy Dee"
14. "Epitaph (Black and Blue)" (Donnie Fritts, Kristofferson)
15. "Enough for You"
16. "Getting By, High, and Strange"

== Personnel ==
- Kris Kristofferson – guitar, vocals

== Charts ==
| Chart (2010) | Peak position |
|---|---|
| U.S. Billboard Top Country Albums | 61 |
