= Broken Freedom Song: Live from San Francisco =

Live album by Kris Kristofferson
- Released: July 8, 2003
- Recorded: July 19, 2002
- Genre: Country
- Length: 52:43
- Label: Oh Boy
- Producer: Alan V. Abrahams

Kris Kristofferson chronology
The Austin Sessions (1999)	Broken Freedom Song: Live from San Francisco (2003)	The Essential Kris Kristofferson (2004)

Professional ratings
Review scores
Source	Rating
AllMusic	4.5/5 stars
Rolling Stone	3/5 stars

Broken Freedom Song: Live from San Francisco is a live album by Kris Kristofferson, released in 2003 on the Oh Boy record label. Recorded in San Francisco on July 19, 2002, the album features few of Kristofferson's most well-known songs, one of the sole exceptions being the title track. The subject matter is largely political and many of the numbers featured are protest songs, but several love songs were performed as well.

== Track listing ==
All songs written by Kris Kristofferson except where noted.

1. "Shipwrecked in the Eighties" – 4:12
2. "Darby's Castle" – 3:52
3. "Broken Freedom Song" – 4:23
4. "Shandy (The Perfect Disguise)" – 3:43
5. "What About Me" – 2:57
6. "Here Comes That Rainbow Again" – 2:44
7. "Nobody Wins" – 2:47
8. "The Race" – 2:05
9. "The Captive" – 3:15
10. "The Circle (Song for Layla Al-Attar and Los Olvidados of Argentina)" – 6:20
11. "Sky King" – 2:45
12. "Sandinista" – 3:38
13. "Moment of Forever" (Kristofferson, Daniel Timms) – 2:44
14. "Don't Let the Bastards Get You Down" – 2:59
15. "Road Warrior's Lament" – 4:19
