= Closer to the Bone =

Studio album by Kris Kristofferson
- Released: September 28, 2009
- Genre: Country
- Language: English
- Label: New West
- Producer: Don Was

Kris Kristofferson chronology
This Old Road (2006)	Closer to the Bone (2009)	Please Don't Tell Me How the Story Ends: The Publishing Demos (2010)

Professional ratings
Review scores
Source	Rating
Allmusic	4/5 stars
American Songwriter	4/5 stars
BBC	(favorable)
No Depression	(favorable)
Now	4/5 stars
Rolling Stone	3.5/5 stars
Engine 145	4/5 stars
Uncut	2/5 stars

Closer to the Bone is the twentieth studio album by Kris Kristofferson. The album was released in the UK on September 28, 2009, and in the US on September 29, 2009 on the New West record label.

Kristofferson has said: ''Closer to the Bone is a reflective album. It's about making sense of life at this end of the game." It was originally entitled Starlight and Stone, but Kristofferson changed it to Closer to the Bone as he felt like it was more descriptive of the meaning of the album: "...the closer to the bone you are and the closer to the truth."

The song, "Good Morning John" was written in the 1970s and is about Johnny Cash. Kristofferson wrote "Sister Sinead" as a tribute to Sinéad O'Connor. The album is dedicated to Stephen Bruton.

== Track listing ==
(All songs by Kris Kristofferson, except as noted)

1. "Closer to the Bone"
2. "From Here to Forever" (Kristofferson, Stephen Bruton, Glen Clark)
3. "Holy Woman"
4. "Starlight and Stone"
5. "Sister Sinead"
6. "Hall of Angels"
7. "Love Don't Live Here Anymore"
8. "Good Morning John"
9. "Tell Me One More Time"
10. "Let the Walls Come Down"
11. "The Wonder"
12. "I Hate Your Ugly Face"

== Personnel ==
- Kris Kristofferson - vocals, acoustic guitar, harmonica
- Rami Jaffee - keyboards
- Stephen Bruton - guitar, mandolin, backing vocals
- Don Was - bass guitar
- Jim Keltner - drums

== Charts ==
Chart performance for Closer to the Bone
Chart (2009)	Peak position
US Billboard 200	167
US Independent Albums (Billboard)	28
US Top Country Albums (Billboard)	29
