= The Cedar Creek Sessions =

Studio album by Kris Kristofferson
- Released: June 17, 2016
- Recorded: June 24–25, 2014
- Studio: Cedar Creek Recording, Austin, Texas
- Genre: Americana
- Label: KK Records
- Producer: Shawn Camp, Tamara Saviano

Kris Kristofferson chronology
The Complete Monument & Columbia Album Collection (2016)	The Cedar Creek Sessions (2016)

The Cedar Creek Sessions is the 22nd and final studio album by Kris Kristofferson, released on June 17, 2016. It earned Kristofferson a Grammy Award nomination for Best Americana Album.

== Track listing ==
Disc 1

1. "Duvalier's Dream"
2. "The Loving Gift" (with Sheryl Crow)
3. "The Sabre and the Rose"
4. "The Law Is for the Protection of the People"
5. "It No Longer Matters What I Do"
6. "Stagger Mountain Tragedy"
7. "The Wife You Save"
8. "Lay Me Down and Love The World Away"
9. "The Bigger The Fool (The Harder They Fall)"
10. "Sunday Mornin' Comin' Down"
11. "Spooky Lady's Revenge"
12. "Forever in Your Love"
13. "Winter"

Disc 2

1. "Darby's Castle"
2. "Me and Bobby McGee"
3. "Broken Freedom Song"
4. "Casey's Last Ride"
5. "Billy Dee"
6. "Easter Island"
7. "For The Good Times"
8. "Help Me Make It Through the Night"
9. "Jody and The Kid"
10. "Loving Her Was Easier (Than Anything I'll Ever Do Again)"
11. "Risky Business"
12. "To Beat The Devil"

== Personnel ==
- Kris Kristofferson - vocals
- Shawn Camp - lead guitar
- Kevin Smith - bass guitar
- Michael Ramos - keyboards
- Mike Meadows - drums
