= Shake Hands with the Devil (album) =

Studio album by Kris Kristofferson
- Released: July 1979
- Genre: Country
- Length: 32:57
- Label: Monument
- Producer: David Anderle

Kris Kristofferson chronology
Natural Act (1978)	Shake Hands with the Devil (1979)	To the Bone (1981)

Shake Hands with the Devil is the ninth solo album by Kris Kristofferson, released in 1979 on Monument Records. Several of the songs on the album were written by Kristofferson years before its release.

== Background ==
By the end of the Seventies, Kristofferson was having much more success as a film actor than a recording artist, having won a Golden Globe for his role in the 1976 blockbuster A Star Is Born. He had not had a hit solo LP since 1973's Jesus Was a Capricorn, itself largely fueled by the surprise country gospel hit "Why Me", and a ten album contract with Monument, of which Shake Hands with the Devil was the ninth since 1970, resulted in rushed albums that many critics felt did not match the high standards of his early recordings. He was in the midst of divorcing wife and duet partner Rita Coolidge, whose recording career had eclipsed his by this time.

== Recording and composition ==
Shake Hands with the Devil was produced by David Anderle, who had produced all of Kristofferson's solo albums since 1973. In his 2008 biography Kristofferson: The Wild American, Stephen Miller comments that, considering the singer's string of commercial failures, it's somewhat surprising that there was no insistence from Monument "on trying out a different producer, the usual course when a formula has become stale…With David Aderle once again behind the controls and the same nucleus of musicians, even though some different styles were tried out – a Caribbean feel here, some Tex-Mex there – the results were unremittingly monotonous."

For years critics had complained that Kristofferson's interest in Hollywood had reduced his albums to nothing more than afterthoughts, and this idea was reinforced by the fact that Shake Hands with the Devil consisted mostly of songs from his past, such as the title track, which was an unheard 1970 copyright, as well as "Come Sundown", which hit the Top 10 for Bobby Bare in 1970 (and would also be recorded twice by George Jones) and "Once More with Feeling," which was a Top 5 country smash for Jerry Lee Lewis the same year. (Lewis, well-known for altering the lyrics to songs however he pleased in the studio and on stage, told biographer Rick Bragg in 2014, "You don't mess with Kristofferson.") Kristofferson and Aderle dusted off two numbers associated with the films the singer had been involved in, including "Michoacan" from 1971's Cisco Pike, and "Seadream", which Kristofferson wrote for the 1976 film The Sailor Who Fell from Grace with the Sea. Tom Ghent's "Whiskey, Whiskey", a 1970 country hit for Nat Stuckey, was in Kristofferson's concerts as far back as 1972, and the somewhat menacing "Killer Barracuda" was a Kristofferson copyright from 1975. The only brand new song from Kristofferson's pen on the LP was the Caribbean-tinged ballad "Prove It to You One More Time Again", which was released as a single and barely scraped the lower reaches of the country singles chart. Soon-to-be ex-wife Rita Coolidge provides background vocals on the album and also received a co-writing credit for "Fallen Angel".

== Reception ==
Professional ratings
Review scores
Source	Rating
AllMusic	2/5 stars

Shake Hands with the Devil was the first Kristofferson album that failed to make the charts. AllMusic's William Ruhlmann writes, "By the time of Shake Hands With the Devil, the ninth album of Kris Kristofferson's ten-album contract with Monument Records, he must have considered his recording career an afterthought to his more prominent career in the movies. That's what's suggested by this album, to which he's given little thought." Kristofferson biographer Stephen Miller also takes a dim view of the album and takes Kristofferson to task for his singing, commenting "From the opening track, it was clear that even by his unorthodox standards, Kristofferson was on worse vocal form than usual; often well off-key and with poor phrasing and timing, he exhibited less ability than the average club singer or karaoke hopeful."

== Track listing ==
All songs by Kristofferson except as noted

1. "Shake Hands With the Devil" – 3:27
2. "Prove It to You One More Time Again" – 2:44
3. "Whiskey, Whiskey" (Tom Ghent) – 3:47
4. "Lucky in Love" (Kristofferson, Stephen Bruton, Michael Utley) – 2:42
5. "Seadream" – 3:03
6. "Killer Barracuda" – 3:02
7. "Come Sundown" – 3:40
8. "Michoacan" (Atweed Allen, Kim Fowley) – 3:00
9. "Once More With Feeling" (Kristofferson, Shel Silverstein) – 2:51
10. "Fallen Angel" (Kristofferson, Bruton, Utley, Rita Coolidge) – 4:11

== Personnel ==
- Kris Kristofferson - guitar, vocals
- Fred Tackett, Stephen Bruton - guitar
- Tommy McClure - bass
- Donnie Fritts - keyboards
- Mike Utley - keyboards, synthesizers, horn arrangements
- Sammy Creason - drums
- Darrell Leonard, Dwight Smith, Lon Price - horns
- Lon Price - saxophone soloist on "Michoacan"
- Billy Swan, Mike Utley, Rita Coolidge, Stephen Bruton - background vocals

Technical

- David Anderle, Mike Utley, Peggy McCreary - mixing
- Peggy McCreary, Ron Hitchcock - recording
