= A Moment of Forever =

Studio album by Kris Kristofferson
- Released: August 15, 1995
- Genre: Country
- Length: 58:38
- Label: Justice Records
- Producer: Don Was

Kris Kristofferson chronology
Live at the Philharmonic (1992)	A Moment of Forever (1995)	The Austin Sessions (1999)

Professional ratings
Review scores
Source	Rating
Allmusic	3/5 stars

A Moment of Forever is an album by Kris Kristofferson, released on Justice Records, an independent record label, in 1995 (see 1995 in music). His first studio album of original material since the relatively unsuccessful political record Third World Warrior (1990), it features several well-known studio musicians, including Jim Keltner and Benmont Tench. The album retained the recurring theme of freedom from oppression, but to a lesser extent than his previous two politically charged records - the aforementioned Third World Warrior and Repossessed (1986). The song "Johnny Lobo" is about the Indian activist John Trudell.

== Track listing ==
All songs written by Kris Kristofferson except where noted.

1. "A Moment of Forever" (Kristofferson, Daniel Timms) – 4:07
2. "Worth Fighting For" (Kristofferson, Timms) – 5:27
3. "Johnny Lobo" – 5:09
4. "The Promise" – 4:42
5. "Shipwrecked in the Eighties" – 4:04
6. "Slouching Toward the Millennium" – 3:42
7. "Between Heaven and Here" – 3:46
8. "Casey's Last Ride" – 4:09
9. "Good Love (Shouldn't Feel So Bad)" – 3:37
10. "New Game Now" – 4:24
11. "New Mister Me" – 3:11
12. "Under the Gun" (Kristofferson, Guy Clark) – 4:40
13. "Road Warrior's Lament" – 5:46
14. "Sam's Song (Ask Any Working Girl)" – 1:51

== Personnel ==
- Kris Kristofferson – vocals, acoustic guitar, harmonica
- Billy Swan – backing vocals
- Sweet Pea Atkinson – backing vocals
- Jim Keltner – drums, percussion
- Benmont Tench – organ
- Sir Harry Bowens – backing vocals
- Turner Stephen Bruton – electric guitar, backing vocals
- David Campbell – strings, arranger
- Jonell Mosser – backing vocals
- Dean Parks – mandolin, electric guitar
- Jimmy Powers – electric guitar
- Daniel Timms – acoustic guitar, piano, backing vocals
- Don Was – bass
- Reggie Young – electric guitar
- Waddy Wachtel – acoustic, electric, steel and slide guitar
- Suzie Katayama – accordion, cello
