= The Silver Tongued Devil and I =

Studio album by Kris Kristofferson
- Released: July 1971
- Recorded: Early 1971
- Studios: Monument, Nashville, Tennessee
- Genre: Country
- Length: 32:22
- Label: Monument
- Producer: Fred Foster

Kris Kristofferson chronology
Kristofferson (1970)	The Silver Tongued Devil and I (1971)	Border Lord (1972)

Singles from The Silver Tongued Devil and I
- 1. "Lovin' Her Was Easier (Than Anything I'll Ever Do Again)" Released: August 21, 1971

The Silver Tongued Devil and I is the second studio album recorded by singer-songwriter Kris Kristofferson. It was produced by Fred Foster, released in July 1971 on Monument Records and followed his critically acclaimed debut Kristofferson.

The album is mostly composed of Kristofferson's self-written material. It met critical success upon its release and unlike its predecessor, had commercial success. It became a top-thirty album on the Billboard Top LPs & Tape chart and reached the top five of the Hot Country LPs chart. Its single, "Lovin' Her Was Easier (Than Anything I'll Ever Do Again)" charted on the Billboard Hot 100 at number twenty-six and Easy Listening chart at number four. The Silver Tongued Devil and I was later certified gold.

== Background and recording ==
In 1969, Kris Kristofferson signed a recording contract with producer Fred Foster, and joined Monument Records and its publishing house Combine Music. His debut album Kristofferson was a critical success but it sold poorly. That year, Kristofferson started an eighteen-month tour, during which he suffered a bout of walking pneumonia, which was worsened by his alcohol consumption. While performing, he would not face the audience and mumbled the words to his songs. Eventually, he was hospitalized.

During the tour, Kristofferson performed on The Johnny Cash Show. While in California, Kristofferson met and became friends with singer Janis Joplin. Upon returning to Nashville, Tennessee, in early 1971, he received with his mail at Combine Music Joplin's posthumous album Pearl, which at the time was still unreleased. Joplin's album included a cover of his original composition "Me and Bobby McGee". The following morning, he returned to the studio and recorded the songs for his second release, titled The Silver Tongued Devil and I.

== Composition ==
"The Silver Tongued Devil and I"
Excerpt of the title-track, and opening of the album

"The Silver Tongued Devil and I" opens the album. The song is set in Tally-Ho Tavern, a Music Row bar where Kristofferson worked earlier as a bartender; the patrons included musicians and songwriters. Kristofferson describes a man drinking in a bar; he is too shy to talk to a woman. As the character gets drunk, he tries to warn the woman of "The Silver Tongued Devil" that alcohol brings out in him and how it controls him, inevitably seducing women. Kristofferson was known among his peers to easily cause the infatuation of women, a recurring theme in the songs of the album. According to Kristofferson's biographers, due to the autobiographical nature of the record, he may have experienced guilt because his sporadic partners aimed to romantic-related results, while he did not.

"Jody and the Kid" had been recorded in 1968 by Roy Drusky and became a radio hit while Kristofferson worked as a janitor for Columbia Records. The inspiration for the song was an experience Kristofferson had at Tally-Ho Tavern. As he approached the building with his daughter Tracy, a patron shouted: "Look, here comes Critter, and the kid", in reference to one of Kristofferson's nicknames, Critter. The song tells the story of a young girl who follows the main character, and the positive reaction of the locals who see them together. As they grow older, they become lovers. At the end of the story, the main character walks with his daughter. While the locals acknowledge them as they pass by, he laments that his partner is absent. "Billy Dee" described the life struggles of a heroin addict whose life ends with an overdose.

"Good Christian Soldier" was written by Billy Joe Shaver, who was working for singer Bobby Bare as a songwriter. Bare introduced Shaver to Chet Atkins, who asked him to write a "tongue-in-cheek" song about the Vietnam War. Shaver, who did not understand the expression, decided instead to write a song about how he felt the experience of war would affect him. Atkins was unhappy with the result, and following his reaction Shaver decided to leave Nashville. Bare pleaded with Shaver, who was already set to leave. At 3 am, Kristofferson called Bare. After a night out, Kristofferson wanted to tell Bare about the new album he was working on. Bare agreed and asked Shaver to stay and wait for Kristofferson. When Kristofferson arrived, Bare asked Shaver to play one of his songs. Shaver sang "Christian Soldier", which he had just completed. Kristofferson was impressed and assured Shaver he would include it on his release. Shaver, who thought Kristofferson mocked him, drove to Texas. Weeks later, Bare called Shaver to notify him Kristofferson had included the song on his album. To Shaver's displeasure, Bare also informed him he changed the name of the song to "Good Christian Soldier" and that he now had a co-writing credit. The song is about the war experience of a preacher's son from Oklahoma.

"Breakdown (A Long Way From Home)" is featured on Kristofferson's acting debut, the 1972 film Cisco Pike, which was still unreleased at the time of the album's recording. The song is about a man who reminisces about his past. The following track "Lovin' Her Was Easier (Than Anything I'll Ever Do Again)", which was written by Kristofferson in 1969 as he accompanied Dennis Hopper during the production of The Last Movie, was also included in Cisco Pike. Kristofferson was inspired by the scenery of the Andes mountain range. The song was first recorded and released by Roger Miller in early July 1971 on Mercury Records; Miller's version entered the Top 30 of Billboard's Hot Country Singles.

"The Taker", also written by Kristofferson, was first recorded by Waylon Jennings and released as the title track of his 1971 album. The song is about a man who attracts a woman who becomes infatuated with him. The man takes advantage of the woman, takes her for granted and leaves her. "When I Loved Her", the next track, was first recorded and released by Ray Price in July 1971 as the B-side to another Kristofferson song, "I'd Rather Be Sorry".

"The Pilgrim, Chapter 33"
Dedicated to Kristofferson's peers, the song was also featured in the film, Cisco Pike

"The Pilgrim, Chapter 33" describes a man who has fallen upon hard times. The character had a past full of "money, love and dreams" that he traded for his current life as he went after his purpose despite the consequences. The song was inspired by Kristofferson's own experience of living as a songwriter, as well as that of one of his often-unemployed peers. He opened the song by listing the artists who inspired it; Chris Gantry, Johnny Cash, Bobby Neuwirth, Norman Blake, Norbert Putnam, Funky Donnie Fritts, Ramblin' Jack Elliott, Dennis Hopper, Jerry Jeff Walker and Paul Siebel. The song is also featured in Cisco Pike.

"Epitaph (Black and Blue)" closes the album. Kristofferson listened repeatedly to Janis Joplin's album Pearl and was affected by her recent death; he wrote the song in one night. Session musician Donnie Fritts assisted him with the composition on the keyboard. Fritts wrote the tune initially using simple chords that he eventually modified using rhythm-and-blues-style passing chords. As Fritts performed the recent changes for Kristofferson, Foster—who was in the control room—said he wanted the song to be only performed by Fritts and Kristofferson for the album. Foster later added scarce string backing to the last verse. While recounting his experience to Uncut, Kristofferson said: "It's the kind of song you write because you have to, not because you want to".

== Style ==
The production of The Silver Tongued Devil and I introduced violins and a horn section to Kristofferson's music. The theme remained centered in his songwriting. At the time of its release, fans of the album argued it was a concept album. Kristofferson later expressed uncertainty of his intentions while working on it; he stated, "I was just trying to put together my best songs in a way that all made sense".

The cover of the album shows Kristofferson standing front-and-center while to his left, his own faded figure—which was intended to represent "The Silver Tongued Devil"—is visible. The picture was taken by Baron Wolman. In the liner notes, Kristofferson wrote; "call these echoes of the going-ups and the coming-downs, walking pneumonia and run-of-the-mill madness, colored with guilt, pride and a vague sense of despair".

== Release and reception ==
Professional ratings
Review scores
Source	Rating
AllMusic	5/5 stars
The Village Voice	C−

The Silver Tongued Devil and I was released in July 1971 to critical and commercial success. It peaked at number twenty-one on Billboard's Top LPs & Tape chart and at number four on the Hot Country LPs chart. By 1973, the album was certified gold by the Recording Industry Association of America. The track "Lovin' Her Was Easier (Than Anything I'll Ever Do Again)" was released as a single on August 21, 1971, and was backed with "Epitaph (Black and Blue)"; it entered the top thirty of Billboard's Hot 100 chart and peaked at number twenty-six. Meanwhile, it reached number four on the Easy Listening chart.

Critic Dave Hickey of Country Music was impressed by Kristofferson's sense of metrics. Of the lines composed by twelve and sixteen syllables he wrote; "they are so tight and clear that it is like having another rhythm instrument in the band". Hickey also wrote; "There has never been, and probably never will be a better songwriter album". Robert Christgau of The Village Voice rated the album C− and criticized what he considered Kristofferson's "pet paradox" as a songwriter and a "hobo intellectual as Music Row hit man". He called Kristofferson's contributions to the album "ungainly, not to say dishonest".

Billboard said the album shows Kristofferson's "consummate skill at natural, sincere simple country songs" and that his "untrained bass voice" interprets the songs "even better" than artists who had previously covered his work. Stereo Review delivered a favorable review, saying the album is "better" than Kristofferson's debut album. The review predicted The Silver Tongued Devil and I would have "much less impact" than his first album but that it presents a "much more assured singer" than his debut record. Audio called Kristofferson a writer "filled with pathos and compassion" who "put both into his lyrics" and said the release benefits from his "husky, sorrowful voice".

In a later review, William Ruhlmann of AllMusic said that the album contains "several excellent songs" but said it "could not live up to its predecessor ... the antiestablishment tone of some of Kristofferson was gone along with much of the wry humor, and in their place were touches of morbidity and sentimentality".

== In popular culture ==
The Silver Tongued Devil and I is featured in Martin Scorsese's 1976 film Taxi Driver. In a scene, the main character Travis Bickle's (Robert De Niro) love interest compares him to the character of "The Pilgrim, Chapter 33" and Bickle later buys the record. Before Scorsese filmed Taxi Driver, Kristofferson played a supporting role in Scorsese's film Alice Doesn't Live Here Anymore.

== Track listing ==
Side one
No.	Title	Writer(s)	Length
1.	"The Silver Tongued Devil and I"	Kristofferson	4:13
2.	"Jody and the Kid"	Kristofferson	3:09
3.	"Billy Dee"	Kristofferson	2:53
4.	"Good Christian Soldier"	Billy Joe Shaver, Bobby Bare	3:18
5.	"Breakdown (A Long Way from Home)"	Kristofferson	2:41

Side two
No.	Title	Writer(s)	Length
1.	"Lovin' Her Was Easier (Than Anything I'll Ever Do Again)"	Kristofferson	3:35
2.	"The Taker"	Kristofferson, Shel Silverstein	3:11
3.	"When I Loved Her"	Kristofferson	2:56
4.	"The Pilgrim, Chapter 33"	Kristofferson	3:05
5.	"Epitaph (Black and Blue)"	Kristofferson, Donnie Fritts	3:21

== Personnel ==
Musicians

- Kris Kristofferson – guitar, vocals
- Jerry Kennedy, Jerry Shook, Chris Gantry – guitar
- Norbert Putnam, Bobby Dyson, Billy Swan – bass
- Jerry Carrigan – drums
- David Briggs, Donnie Fritts – keyboards
- Norman Blake – dobro
- Charlie McCoy – harmonica, vibraphone
- Farrell Morris – percussion
- Billy Swan, Donnie Fritts, Rita Coolidge – vocals
- Byron Bach, Brenton Banks, Gary Vanosdale, George Binkley, Lillian Hunt, Martin Katahn, Marvin Chantry, Sheldon Kurland, Solie Fott – strings
- Arrangements by Bergen White
- Joan Baez sings on "The Taker", credited only as "The Lady"

Recording studio

- Fred Foster – producer
- Gene Eichelberger, Tommy Strong, Mort Thomasson – engineer
- Ken Kim – art direction, photography
- Baron Wolman – cover photography

== Chart positions ==
=== Album ===
Chart (1971)	Peak position
Billboard Top LPs & Tape	21
Hot Country LPs	4

=== Singles ===
Year	Song	Chart	Peak position
1971	"Lovin' Her Was Easier (Than Anything I'll Ever Do Again)"	Billboard Hot 100	26
1971	"Lovin' Her Was Easier (Than Anything I'll Ever Do Again)"	Billboard Easy Listening	4

== Certifications and sales ==
Region	Certification	Certified units/sales
United States (RIAA)	Gold	500,000^{^}
^{^} Shipments figures based on certification alone.
