= Jesus Was a Capricorn =

Studio album by Kris Kristofferson
- Released: November 1972
- Studios: Quadrafonic Sound, Nashville, Tennessee; Monument Recording, Nashville, Tennessee
- Genre: Alternative country
- Length: 31:21
- Label: Monument
- Producers: Fred Foster, Dennis Linde

Kris Kristofferson chronology
Border Lord (1972)	Jesus Was a Capricorn (1972)	Full Moon (1973)

Singles from Jesus Was a Capricorn
- 1. "Why Me" Released: April 1973

Jesus Was a Capricorn is the fourth studio album by American musician Kris Kristofferson, released in 1972 on Monument Records. The album cover pictures Kristofferson and his soon-to-be wife Rita Coolidge. The single "Why Me" reached No. 1 on the US country chart.

== Recording and composition ==
Jesus Was a Capricorn was produced by Fred Foster and, like his previous album Border Lord, features more elaborate instrumentation than his first two LPs. Biographer Stephen Miller notes in his book Kristofferson: The Wild American, "A common criticism directed at Jesus Was a Capricorn was that it was overproduced and moved Kristofferson's songs too far away from the rough-hewn charm of his earlier work." The title track, with its chorus containing the line "Cos everybody's got to have somebody to look down on" was interpreted by some as Kristofferson's reply to critics who disparaged his previous album Border Lord. The song, and Kristofferson's phrasing, is very reminiscent of John Prine, of whom Kristofferson was an early champion. Kristofferson told Graeme Thomson of Uncut in 2016, "I wrote 'Jesus Was A Capricorn (Owed To John Prine)' because I was so influenced by John. When I heard his songs I felt like his writing had kicked me into doing it. You take things from all over the place, though you don't always admit it! I was really influenced by Roger Miller, Shel Silverstein and Mickey Newbury. Everybody you admire influences you somehow in your art."

Another song from the album with a religious theme would become the biggest hit of Kristofferson's career: "Why Me". According to country music historian Bill Malone, Kristofferson wrote the song during an emotionally low period of his life after having attended a religious service conducted by the Rev. Jimmie Rogers Snow. Malone wrote, "'Why Me, Lord'"—as the song is sometimes known—"may seem greatly out of character for Kristofferson, but it can be interpreted as his own personal religious rephrasing of 'Sunday Morning Coming Down.' In this case, he is 'coming down' not from drugs, but from the whole hedonistic euphoria of the (1960s)." Malone described Kristofferson's gruff vocal styling as "perfect" for the song, since "he sounds like a man who has lived a lot but is now humbling himself before God." Kristofferson said he went with friends to the church service where he was moved by Larry Gatlin's song "Help Me (Lord)". He said that he had never thought of needing help, but he was at a low point in his life. When the pastor asked the congregation, "Is anybody feeling lost?" "Up goes my hand," Kristofferson says. The Pastor then asked, "Are you ready to accept Christ? Kneel down there." "I'm kneeling there," Kristofferson continues, "and I carry a big load of guilt around...and I was just out of control, crying. It was a release. It really shook me up." Kristofferson later said, "It was just a personal thing I was going through at the time. I had some kind of experience that I can't even explain." Kristofferson met June Carter Cash and Johnny Cash in a hotel room in 1972 to play them two songs he had written. Kristofferson had just attended a rough screening of a movie Johnny and June were heavily involved in, entitled The Gospel Road. Johnny Cash's memoir Man in Black, reiterated the story that Larry Gatlin sang "Help Me" at the Evangel Temple, which inspired Kristofferson to write the song. Kristofferson also played Cash the song "Burden of Freedom", which was used in The Gospel Road.

"Why Me" became an immediate country gospel standard. Elvis Presley incorporated the song, retitled "Why Me Lord", into his live shows beginning in January 1974 up until his last concert tour. It was first released on the live album, Elvis Recorded Live On Stage In Memphis in June 1974. The recording is from his March 20, 1974 concert in Memphis, Tennessee. He often introduced the song for J.D. Sumner to sing "one of his favorite songs". Sumner would sing the verses and Elvis would join on the chorus along with the back-up singers. The song would also be recorded by Johnny Cash, George Jones, Merle Haggard, Conway Twitty, Willie Nelson, Connie Smith, and David Allan Coe.

Although "Why Me" revealed another side of Kristofferson's songwriting, the subject matter in his songs remained rooted in the grim realities of life, exploring broken relationships, lost family, drug addiction, and prostitution. As Michael Striessguth put it in his book Outlaw: Waylon, Willie, Kris, and the Renegades of Nashville, "By 1972, singer-songwriter meant James Taylor and Carole King, whose soft sounds and safe lyrics appealed to radio, while Kristofferson's music continued to mine the oil-stained streets for inspiration, producing ruminations on prostitution, dissipation, and getting high that proved too thorny for the broadcast airwaves." This uncompromising artistic stance might be most apparent in the song "Sugar Man", "a noirish study of a woman prowling the streets, selling her body, and injecting heroin." Kristofferson, who fell out with his parents after rejecting a career at West Point to pursue a career as a songwriter, addresses his lost family in "Jesse Younger", his anger evident in the performance, which contains much of the sarcastic aggressiveness found in "Blame It on the Stones" from his debut album.

Some critics felt Kristofferson's burgeoning film career was a distraction and his songwriting was slipping. The singer later reflected, "It was as if I were spending so much creative energy on the wrong thing, performing and movies that my songwriting was suffering. I don't think it was." Kristofferson's albums were still being mined by other recording artists within and outside country music. Frank Sinatra covered "Nobody Wins" for his 1973 comeback album Ol' Blue Eyes Is Back, while Brenda Lee covered the song the same year on her album Brenda, taking it to No. 5 on the US country chart. As on Kristofferson's previous album, girlfriend and soon-to-be wife Rita Coolidge sings on the album, contributing vocals to "Give It Time to Be Tender" and "It Sure Was (Love)". He also duets with Larry Gatlin on Gatlin's composition "Help Me".

== Reception ==
Professional ratings
Review scores
Source	Rating
AllMusic	3.5/5 stars
Rolling Stone	(mixed)

The first two singles from the album, the title track and "Jesse Younger", both underperformed. The label then released "Why Me" as the third single, which quickly entered the country and pop charts. The song topped the US country chart in July 1973, also peaking at No. 20 on the Billboard Hot 100 after a slow climb in November. This brought "Jesus Was a Capricorn" back up the charts as well, reaching No. 1 on the country charts a full year after it had been released. Both the album and the "Why Me" single went gold, giving Kristofferson his greatest success as a recording artist.

Record World called the title track a "funky song with a sing along kind of chorus with timely and clever lyrics delivered with appropriate gusto by Kris."

== Track listing ==
All songs by Kris Kristofferson except as noted.

1. "Jesus Was a Capricorn (Owed to John Prine)" – 2:28
2. "Nobody Wins" – 3:06
3. "It Sure Was (Love)" – 2:51
4. "Enough for You" – 3:05
5. "Help Me" (Larry Gatlin) – 3:22
6. "Jesse Younger" – 2:40
7. "Give It Time to Be Tender" (Kristofferson, Donnie Fritts) – 3:26
8. "Out of Mind, Out of Sight" (Kristofferson, Stephen Bruton) – 2:58
9. "Sugar Man" – 3:59
10. "Why Me" – 3:26

== Personnel ==
- Kris Kristofferson – vocals, guitar
- Rita Coolidge – backing vocals on "It Sure Was (Love)", "Help Me", "Give It Time to Be Tender" and "Why Me"
- Andrew Newmark, Kenny Buttrey – drums
- Chip Young, Dennis Linde, Fred Carter Jr., Grady Martin, Jerry Shook, Jimmy Colvard, John Buck Wilkin, Johnny Christopher, Mac Gayden, Stephen Bruton – guitar
- Norbert Putnam, Tommy Cogbill – bass guitar
- "Uncle Josh" Graves – slide dobro
- Weldon Myrick – steel guitar
- Bobby Emmons, Bobby Wood, David Briggs, John Harris, Mike Utley – piano, electric piano, organ
- Alan Rush, Benny Whitehead, Billy Swan, Larry Gatlin, Randy Cullers, The Bergenaires, The Joint Venture, The Jordanaires – backing vocals
- Brenton Banks, Byron Bach, Carl Gorodetzky, David Darling, George Binkley, Lillian Hunt, Sheldon Kurland, Steven Smith – strings
- Bill Justis – string arrangements

== Charts ==
=== Weekly charts ===
Chart (1972–1973)	Peak position
Canada Top Albums/CDs (RPM)	27
US Billboard 200	31
US Top Country Albums (Billboard)	1

=== Year-end charts ===
Chart (1973)	Position
US Billboard 200	31
US Top Country Albums (Billboard)	10

== Certifications and sales ==
Region	Certification	Certified units/sales
United States (RIAA)	Gold	500,000^{^}
^{^} Shipments figures based on certification alone.

== Bibliography ==
- Miller, Stephen (2009). Kristofferson: The Wild American. Omnibus Press. ISBN 9780857121097.
- Streissguth, Michael (2013). Outlaw: Waylon, Willie, Kris, and the Renegades of Nashville. HarperCollins. ISBN 978-0062038180.
