= Border Lord =

Studio album by Kris Kristofferson
- Released: February 1972
- Genre: Country
- Length: 33:27
- Label: Monument
- Producer: Fred Foster

Kris Kristofferson chronology
The Silver Tongued Devil and I (1971)	Border Lord (1972)	Jesus Was a Capricorn (1972)

Border Lord is the third album by Kris Kristofferson, released in 1972 on Monument Records.

== Recording and composition ==
After enjoying enormous success as a songwriter in 1970 and 1971, including Song of the Year awards from both the Country Music Association and Academy of Country Music, Kristofferson’s second album, The Silver Tongued Devil and I, established him as a recording artist in his own right. However, after having the luxury of honing his compositions over a period of years, he had just a matter of months to write songs for Border Lord. As noted by AllMusic's William Ruhlmann:

…he was afforded precious little time to craft his next work. Border Lord, which, like its predecessors, was an album of all-original compositions, was in record stores only seven months after The Silver Tongued Devil and I, and it was his third such collection in 20 months. He continued to draw upon the dwindling store of songs in his trunk, using the 1967 copyright "Burden of Freedom," as well as "Somebody Nobody Knows," published in 1968, while two others, "Smokey Put the Sweat on Me" and "When She's Wrong," were published by his first publisher, Buckhorn Music, suggesting that they may have been written well before their 1972 copyright dates.

A dominant theme in the songs on Border Lord is the ill treatment of women, with six tunes, including “Josie” and “Little Girl Lost,” concerning females who had become debased in some way, for which the narrator seems to feel some vicarious or personal guilt. The image of the Devil, already prominent in previous compositions like “The Silver Tongued Devil and I” and “To Beat the Devil,” reappears in five of the songs, giving the collection a desperate, despairing mood overall. Now in demand as a touring performer, two songs, “Getting’ By, High and Strange” and the title track reflected his current circumstances on the road.

Two songs, “Josie,” and “Burden of Freedom,” mined similar territory thematically as “Me and Bobby McGee,” but when "Josie" was released as the album’s lone single it only struggled into the lower reaches of the pop charts. Record World said of "Josie" that it's "a typical 'Kristoffersong — well-written, well-put country-pop."

In 2019, Sheryl Crow released her own version of the title track featuring Kristofferson on her album Threads.

== Reception ==
Professional ratings
Review scores
Source	Rating
AllMusic	3/5 stars

Border Lord was released in February 1972 but failed to achieve the success its predecessors had. At the time of its release, Ben Gerson of Rolling Stone wrote that Kristofferson was "a fast-livin', hard lovin' dude who has just enough time between ballin' and brawlin' to jot down a tune or two. He's a cracker-barrel philosopher…Kris' celebrations of machismo are his most patently stupid observations." Biographer Stephen Miller opines, "While Kris produced some of his affecting poetry with characteristic cleverness, the melodies were unremarkable and with his limited vocal range, a number of the songs suffered from a dirgeful quality."

AllMusic lamented the rushed gestation of the songs, remarking "No doubt Kristofferson and Monument would have been better advised to have waited until he had a collection of songs to match his early hits; instead, he quickly began work on yet another album, Jesus Was a Capricorn, which was out before the end of the year." In contract, writer Michael Streissguth praised the album, maintaining it offered lyrical themes that remained "strongly individualistic and never failed to challenge Nashville's sensibilities." In a 2016 Rolling Stone interview with Neil Strauss, Kristofferson said he was pleasantly surprised with the box set of his work The Complete Monument & Columbia Album Collection, particularly Border Lord, admitting, "I can remember at the time being so disappointed at the reception it got."

== Track listing ==
All songs by Kris Kristofferson except as noted

1. "Josie" – 3:12
2. "Burden of Freedom" – 3:22
3. "Stagger Mountain Tragedy" – 2:53
4. "Border Lord" (Stephen Bruton, Donnie Fritts, Terry Paul, Kristofferson) – 3:38
5. "Somebody Nobody Knows" – 3:36
6. "Little Girl Lost" – 3:10
7. "Smokey Put the Sweat on Me" – 3:10
8. "When She's Wrong" – 4:47
9. "Gettin' By, High and Strange" – 2:37
10. "Kiss the World Goodbye" – 3:01

== Personnel ==
- Kris Kristofferson - vocals, guitar
- Rita Coolidge - vocals
- Pete Drake - steel guitar
- Donnie Fritts - keyboards, background vocals
- Dennis Linde - acoustic and electric guitar
- Billy Swan - bass, background vocals
- Stephen Bruton - acoustic and electric guitar, background vocals
- Kenneth A. Buttrey - drums
- Jerry Carrigan - drums
- Tommy Jackson - fiddle
- Jerry Kennedy - guitar
- Farrell Morris - percussion
- Terry Paul - bass, background vocals
- Jerry Shook - acoustic and electric guitar
- Benny Whitehead - background vocals
- John "Bucky" Wilkin - acoustic and electric guitar
- Charlie McCoy - harmonica, organ

== Production ==
- Produced by Fred Foster
- Tommy Strong, Mort Thomasson, Lou Bradley - engineer
- Ed Lee - cover design
- Arnold Arnhan - cover artwork
- Marian Owen, Janet Madison - back cover photography

== Charts ==
Chart performance for Border Lord
Chart (1972)	Peak position
US Billboard 200	41
US Top Country Albums (Billboard)	6
