= Nobody Wins (Kris Kristofferson song) =

Song by Kris Kristofferson

from the album Jesus Was a Capricorn
- Released: November 1972
- Studio: Quadraphonic Studio; Monument Recording Studios
- Genre: Outlaw country
- Length: 3:06
- Label: Monument Records
- Songwriter(s): Kris Kristofferson
- Producer(s): Fred Foster

"Nobody Wins" is a song written and originally recorded by American singer-songwriter, Kris Kristofferson. It was originally an album track on his 1972 LP, Jesus Was a Capricorn. His version received a positive critical response in the years that followed. The song's most commercially-successful version was recorded by American singer Brenda Lee. Her 1973 single rose into the US country top ten and became her first top ten recording in the genre. It was later released on her 1973 studio album, Brenda.

== Kris Kristofferson version ==
The original version of "Nobody Wins" was written and first recorded by Kris Kristofferson for his 1972 studio album, Jesus Was a Capricorn (released by Monument Records). The song was recorded at both the Quadraphonic Studio and the Monument Recording Studio in Nashville, Tennessee. It was the second track on the album. The song tells the story of a person who realizes their romantic relationship has come to an end and decides they should settle for a truce. Kristofferson's version was given praise by music journalists. Michael Hamm of The Guardian named it "ten of his greatest songs", calling it "a simple and stark heartbreak ballad". Jon Pareles of The New York Times found that his version "perfectly dissects and settles a romantic dead end." When reviewing Jesus Was a Capricorn, AllMusic's William Ruhlamnn called it "the album's best song".

== Brenda Lee version ==
"Nobody Wins"

Single by Brenda Lee

from the album Brenda
- B-side: "We Had a Good Thing Going"
- Released: January 1973
- Studio: Bradley's Barn
- Genre: Country; Countrypolitan
- Length: 2:57
- Label: MCA
- Songwriter(s): Kris Kristofferson
- Producer(s): Owen Bradley

Brenda Lee singles chronology
"Always on My Mind" (1972)	"Nobody Wins" (1973)	"Sunday Sunrise" (1973)

=== Background and recording ===
Brenda Lee was among the top-selling female recording artists of the 1960s decade, having a series of top ten singles with songs like "I'm Sorry", "All Alone Am I" and "Break It to Me Gently". However, by the early 1970s, her commercial success waned and her longtime manager, Dub Albritten, had died. Lee approached her record label about reuniting with her 1960s producer, Owen Bradley, and the label agreed to the change.

Lee then met with country music song publisher, Bob Beckham, who brought her Kristofferson's "Nobody Wins". Lee had originally met Kristofferson when he was working as a janitor in the studio where Lee was recording. In her autobiography, Lee recalled, "The desperately sad song was right up my alley. Especially since I was so down at the time. I actually cried when Beckham played it for me. It's such a great song and I just Kris Kristofferson". Lee's version of the song was recorded at Bradley's Barn, located in Mount Juliet, Tennessee and was produced by Owen Bradley.

=== Release, critical reception and chart performance ===
"Nobody Wins" was released as a seven-inch vinyl single by MCA Records in January 1973. It was backed on the B-side by the track "We Had a Good Thing Going". Billboard magazine named the song one of their "Recommended" pick singles in February 1973. Record World named the song among its "Country Picks of the Week" in February 1973, calling it "Very emotional and very good. Brenda Lee is the perfect artist to deliver the Kristofferson mood. Forget the bullets, this one has the guns!" "Nobody Wins" spent 11 weeks on the US Billboard Hot Country Songs chart, peaking at the number five position in May 1973. It was Lee's first top ten single and fifth entry on the US country chart. It also rose to the number 70 position on the US Billboard Hot 100, becoming her final entry there. It also went to the number one position on Canada's RPM Country Tracks chart around the same period. The song served as the lead single for Lee's 1973 studio album released by MCA titled Brenda.

=== Track listing ===
7" vinyl single

- "Nobody Wins" – 2:57
- "We Had a Good Thing Going" – 2:32

=== Charts ===
==== Weekly charts ====
Weekly chart performance for "Nobody Wins"
Chart (1973)	Peak position
Canada Country Tracks (RPM)	1
US Billboard Hot 100	70
US Hot Country Songs (Billboard)	5
