= Why Me (Kris Kristofferson song) =

Single by Kris Kristofferson

from the album Jesus Was a Capricorn
- B-side: "Help Me"
- Released: March 1973
- Recorded: July 8, 1972
- Studio: Monument Recording, Nashville, Tennessee
- Genre: Country gospel
- Length: 3:26
- Label: Monument Records 31909
- Songwriter: Kris Kristofferson
- Producer: Fred Foster

Kris Kristofferson singles chronology
"Jesse Younger" (1972)	"Why Me" (1973)	"A Song I'd Like to Sing" (1973)

"Why Me" is a country and gospel song written and recorded by American country music singer-songwriter Kris Kristofferson.

== Song history ==
Kristofferson had become the toast of Nashville in the early 1970s, with the massive success of compositions including "For the Good Times", "Me and Bobby McGee", "Sunday Morning Coming Down", and "Help Me Make It Through the Night", among many others. He had a hit of his own as well, with "Lovin' Her Was Easier (Than Anything I'll Ever Do Again)".

"Why Me" was recorded by Kristofferson in 1972, featuring backing vocals by soon-to-be wife Rita Coolidge and up-and-coming singer-songwriter Larry Gatlin. It was released on the album Jesus Was a Capricorn in 1973, and became the biggest hit of his career.

According to country music historian Bill Malone, Kristofferson wrote the song during an emotionally low period of his life after having attended a religious service conducted by the Rev. Jimmie Rogers Snow. Malone wrote, "'Why Me, Lord'" - as the song is sometimes known - "may seem greatly out of character for Kristofferson, but it can be interpreted as his own personal religious rephrasing of 'Sunday Morning Coming Down.' In this case, he is 'coming down' not from drugs, but from the whole hedonistic euphoria of the (1960s)." Malone described Kristofferson's gruff vocal styling as "perfect" for the song, since "he sounds like a man who has lived a lot but is now humbling himself before God."

Kristofferson said he went with friends to the church service where he was moved by Larry Gatlin's song "Help Me (Lord)". He said that he had never thought of needing help, but he was at a low point in his life. When the pastor asked the congregation, "Is anybody feeling lost?" "Up goes my hand," Kristofferson says. The pastor then asked, "Are you ready to accept Christ? Kneel down there." "I'm kneeling there," Kristofferson continues, "and I carry a big load of guilt around...and I was just out of control, crying. It was a release. It really shook me up." Kristofferson later said, "It was just a personal thing I was going through at the time. I had some kind of experience that I can't even explain."

Kristofferson met June Carter Cash and Johnny Cash in a hotel room in 1972 to play them two songs he had written. Kristofferson had just attended a rough screening of a movie Johnny and June were heavily involved in, entitled The Gospel Road. Johnny Cash's memoir Man in Black reiterated the story that Larry Gatlin sang "Help Me" at the Evangel Temple, which inspired Kristofferson to write the song. Kristofferson also played Cash the song "Burden of Freedom", which was used in The Gospel Road.

=== Recognition and awards ===
"Why Me" was Kristofferson's lone major country hit as a solo recording artist, reaching No. 1 on the Billboard Hot Country Singles chart in July 1973. The song peaked only at No. 16 on the Billboard Hot 100, but had at that time one of the longer runs (19 weeks) in the top 40 and the most chart reversals (6) in one run on the Hot 100. The song spent 38 weeks in the Hot 100 consecutively, almost tying the record set by Johnny Mathis' song "Wonderful! Wonderful!" on the charts for 39 weeks. The song ranked sixth on the list of Billboard Year-End Hot 100 singles of 1973.

"Why Me" was certified gold for sales of one million units by the Recording Industry Association of America.

== Chart performance ==
=== Weekly charts ===
Weekly chart performance for "Why Me"
Chart (1973)	Peak position
Canadian RPM Adult Contemporary Tracks	23
Canadian RPM Country Tracks	1
Canadian RPM Top Singles	19
Dutch Top 40	31
South Africa (Springbok Radio)	1
US Billboard Hot 100	16
US Billboard Easy Listening	28
US Billboard Hot Country Singles	1
US Cash Box Top 100	57

=== Year-end charts ===
Year-end chart performance for "Why Me"
Chart (1973)	Rank
Canada RPM Top Singles	82
South Africa	1
US Billboard Hot 100	6

== Certifications and sales ==
Certifications for "Why Me"
Region	Certification	Certified units/sales
United States (RIAA)	Gold	1,000,000^{^}
^{^} Shipments figures based on certification alone.

== Cover versions ==
- Elvis Presley incorporated the song, retitled "Why Me Lord", into his live shows beginning in January 1974 up until his last concert tour. It was first released on the live album Elvis Recorded Live on Stage in Memphis in June 1974. The recording is from his March 20, 1974 concert in Memphis, Tennessee. He often introduced the song for J.D. Sumner to sing "one of his favorite songs." Sumner would sing the verses and Elvis would join on the chorus along with the back-up singers. Presley also recorded the "B" side of the single, "Help Me", written by Larry Gatlin, in December 1973, and it remained part of his live shows as well.
- Connie Smith recorded a version of "Why Me" on her 1973 album God Is Abundant.
- Melba Montgomery recorded "Why Me" in 1973 on her album Melba Montgomery.
- Hank Snow included "Why Me, Lord" in 1974 on his album Hello Love.
- Tanya Tucker included "Why Me Lord" on her 1974 album Would You Lay with Me (In a Field of Stone).
- George Jones recorded a version for his 1974 album In a Gospel Way.
- David Allan Coe included "Why Me" on his 1977 album Texas Moon.
- British singer Cliff Richard recorded a version for his 1978 album Small Corners.
- Willie Nelson included a version of "Why Me" alongside several other covers of songs written by Kris Kristofferson on his aptly titled 1979 album Sings Kristofferson.
- Merle Haggard recorded a version, released on his 1981 album What a Friend We Have in Jesus.
- Bell Gardens released a version of "Why Me Lord" on their 2014 album "Slow Dawns For Lost Conclusions"
- Slovenian a capella group New Swing Quartet recorded a version, released on the 1985 album Oh, Happy Day, titled "Why Me Lord".
- Carlene Davis recorded a version entitled "Why Me Lord" on her 1992 album Jesus Is Only a Prayer Away.
- Johnny Cash also recorded a version of the song titled "Why Me Lord" on his 1994 album American Recordings.
- Conway Twitty released a version on his 1975 album, Linda on My Mind, and then another longer version on his 1994 The Conway Twitty Collection box set.
- Chicago punk band The Smoking Popes recorded a version of this song for their 2001 album The Party's Over.
- The Gaither Vocal Band performed a powerful version of the song during a 2006 Homecoming performance in Toronto. The song was performed with pianist Anthony Burger.
- David Crowder Band recorded a version for their final album, Give Us Rest, which was released in 2012.
- Gospel artist CeCe Winans recorded a version on her 2017 album Let Them Fall in Love.
- Wolfgang Hildebrandt also recorded a version of the song titled "Why Me Lord" on his 2018 album Country Love Songs.
- Josh Turner recorded the song as a duet with Kristofferson on his 2020 album Country State of Mind.
