= Kris Kristofferson =

American singer and actor (1936–2024)

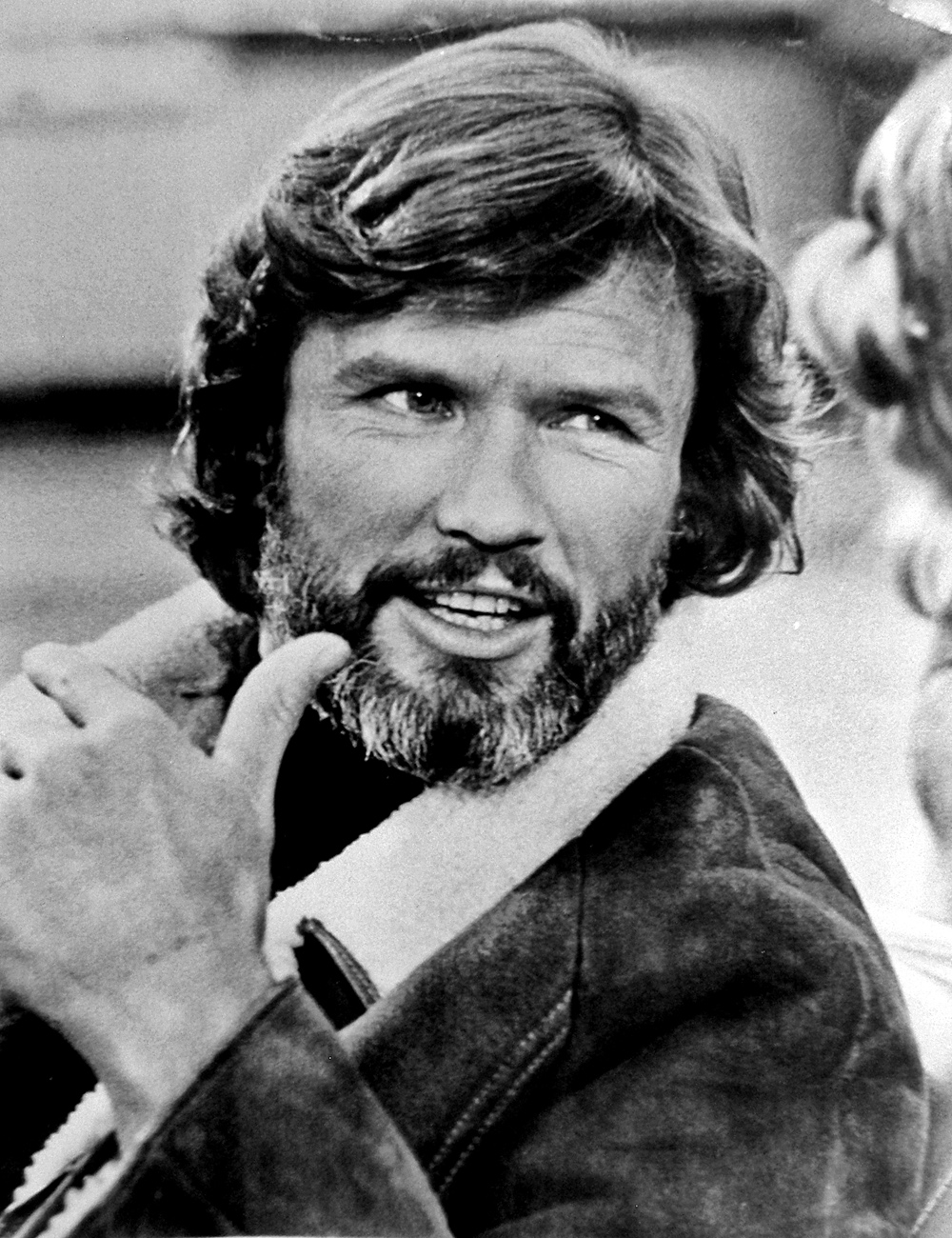
- Kristofferson in 1978
- Born: Kristoffer Kristofferson; June 22, 1936; Brownsville, Texas, U.S.
- Died: September 28, 2024 (aged 88); Hana, Hawaii, U.S.
- Education: Pomona College (BA); Merton College, Oxford (BPhil)
- Occupations: Singer; musician; songwriter; actor
- Years active: 1959–2021
- Works: Discography; filmography
- Spouses: Frances Beer (m. 1961; div. 1969); Rita Coolidge (m. 1973; div. 1980); Lisa Meyers (m. 1983)
- Children: 8
- Musical career
- Genres: Country; folk
- Instruments: Vocals; guitar; harmonica
- Labels: Monument; Mercury; Warner Bros.; New West; Columbia
- Formerly of: The Highwaymen
- Website: kriskristofferson.com

Kristoffer Kristofferson (June 22, 1936 – September 28, 2024) was an American musician, songwriter, and actor. He was a pioneering figure in the outlaw country movement of the 1970s, moving away from the polished Nashville sound and toward a more raw, introspective style. Some of his most famous songs include "Me and Bobby McGee" (1970), "For the Good Times" (1968), "Sunday Mornin' Comin' Down" (1969), and "Help Me Make It Through the Night" (1970), which were also recorded by and became hits for other artists.

Kristofferson was born in Brownsville, Texas. The family relocated to San Mateo, California, during his childhood. He enlisted in military service during the early 1960s. After one single for Epic Records, Kristofferson was signed by Monument Records in 1969. Throughout his career, he recorded a total of 10 albums for Monument, two albums for Mercury Records, one album each for Justice Records and Atlantic Records, and two albums each for New West Records and KK Records.

In 1971, Kristofferson made his film debut in The Last Movie and devoted much of the later decade to making Hollywood films. Some of his most famous films include his collaborations with director Sam Peckinpah on Pat Garrett and Billy the Kid (1973) and Convoy (1978), as well a minor role in Bring Me the Head of Alfredo Garcia (1974). Other roles of his include Cisco Pike (1972), A Star Is Born (1976), Heaven's Gate (1980) and the Blade film trilogy (1998–2004)

Kristofferson was also a member of the country music supergroup the Highwaymen between 1985 and 1995. He has charted 12 times on the American Billboard Hot Country Songs charts; his highest-peaking singles there are "Why Me" and "Highwayman", which reached number one in 1973 and 1985, respectively. He was inducted into the Country Music Hall of Fame in 2004 and received the Grammy Lifetime Achievement Award in 2014. He was a three-time Grammy Award winner, out of 13 total nominations. Kristofferson died in 2024 at the age of 88, three years after announcing his retirement.

== Life and career ==
=== 1936–1965: Early life and military service ===
Kristoffer Kristofferson was born in Brownsville, Texas, the oldest of three children born to Mary Ann (née Ashbrook) and Henry Kristofferson, a United States Army Air Corps officer (later a major general in the United States Air Force). Henry later worked as a manager for Saudi Aramco after retiring from the Air Force. During Kristofferson's childhood, his father encouraged him to pursue a military career.

Kristofferson moved around frequently as a youth because of his father's military service, and the family settled in San Mateo, California. He attended San Mateo High School, where he graduated in 1954. At age 17, Kristofferson took a summer job with a dredging contractor on Wake Island in the western Pacific Ocean.

Kristofferson went to Pomona College in Claremont, California, as a literature major. He studied under Frederick Sontag, whom he considered an important influence in his life. His early writing included prize-winning essays that were published in The Atlantic. During this time, Kristofferson worked in various construction jobs and as a firefighter. He appeared in the March 31, 1958, issue of Sports Illustrated for his achievements in collegiate rugby union, American football, and track and field. He and his classmates also revived the Claremont Colleges Rugby Club, and it remains a Southern California rugby institution. Kristofferson graduated in 1958, earning a Bachelor of Arts degree, summa cum laude, in English Literature. He was elected to the Phi Beta Kappa society his junior year.

Also in 1958, Kristofferson was awarded a Rhodes Scholarship to the University of Oxford in Oxford, England, studying at Merton College. While performing his own songs there, Kristofferson signed with Larry Parnes, best known for his work with Tommy Steele. Parnes was working to sell Kristofferson as "a Yank at Oxford" to the British public; Kristofferson was willing to accept that promotional approach if it helped his singing career, which he hoped would enable him to progress toward his goal of becoming a novelist.

In early 1959, Kristofferson signed a recording contract with Paul Lincoln's Top Rank label as "Kris Carson", but these recordings were unsuccessful. In 1960, Kristofferson graduated with a B.Phil. in English literature.

In 1961, he married his longtime girlfriend, Frances "Fran" Mavia Beer. Also in 1961, Kristofferson joined the United States Army and was commissioned as a second lieutenant. He attended U.S. Army Ranger School and completed helicopter pilot training at Fort Rucker, Alabama. He relocated Beer and their newborn daughter to West Germany, where he served as a member of the 8th Infantry Division. During this period, Kristofferson was promoted to the rank of captain and resumed his music career, forming a band to play at service clubs. It was at this point that he met Marijohn Wilkin, the aunt of his platoon commander. In 1965, after his tour in West Germany ended, Kristofferson was re-assigned to teach English literature at the United States Military Academy in West Point, New York.

=== 1965–1972: Early music and film career ===
In June 1965, while on a two-week leave from his assignments, Kristofferson contacted Wilkin in Nashville, Tennessee, and decided to become a country music songwriter. He resigned from the Army and relocated his family to Nashville that year, exacerbating his relationship with his parents. Wilkin signed Kristofferson to her publishing house Buckhorn Music and pitched his song "Talkin' Vietnam Blues" to singer Dave Dudley. Concurrently, Kristofferson held various jobs including as a bartender, a construction worker, and a railroad worker. He later worked as a janitor for Columbia Records, which afforded him the possibility of talking directly with the artists and a presence during recording sessions. He released his debut single containing his songs "Golden Idol" and "Killing Time" in 1967 on Epic Records.

After his second child was born with esophagus issues in 1968, Kristofferson worked at Petroleum Helicopters International (PHI) in Lafayette, Louisiana. While flying workers to and from oil rigs in the Gulf of Mexico, he would often write new songs. At weekends, he returned to Nashville, and for the following week he would pitch the songs around town before returning to Louisiana. The trips exhausted Kristofferson; his children were living with Fran in California and he felt his career as a songwriter was failing. PHI also admonished him for his increased alcohol consumption. Upon returning to Nashville the same week, Kristofferson learned three of his songs had been recorded: "Jody and the Kid" by Roy Drusky, "Help Me Make It Through the Night" by Jerry Lee Lewis and "Me and Bobby McGee" by Roger Miller.

Through June Carter, Kristofferson first attempted to pitch material to her husband Johnny Cash. Carter took the demos, which were eventually lost in a pile of other material Cash had received. At the time, Kristofferson worked on the weekends for the Tennessee National Guard. To attract Cash's attention, Kristofferson landed a helicopter on Cash's property. Cash eventually invited Kristofferson to a "guitar pull" party in his house. Cash was impressed and invited Kristofferson to perform with him at the 1969 Newport Folk Festival. Unsatisfied by Buckhorn Music, Kristofferson decided to change labels. Monument Records director Bob Beckham invited Kristofferson to play songs for him and label owner Fred Foster. Kristofferson performed "To Beat the Devil", "Jody and the Kid", "The Best of All Possible Worlds" and "Duvalier's Dream"; Foster was impressed and signed Kristofferson to Monument as a recording artist and Combine Music as a songwriter. The ten-year contract required Kristofferson to submit ten records containing songs he had written. Kristofferson was surprised he had been signed as a singer; he told Foster at the time: "I can't sing, I sound like a frog!" Kristofferson later said Buckhorn Music had not allowed him to record demos of his compositions.

In 1969, Kristofferson divorced Beer and left Nashville to join the production of his first motion picture, Dennis Hopper's The Last Movie, in Peru. In his absence, Cash continued promoting Kristofferson's original songs with other singers. Upon returning to Nashville, Kristofferson learned of his new popularity and started to work on his debut album for Monument, Kristofferson. As his manager and producer, Foster had decided to keep some of Kristofferson's original material from being passed to other artists. The new material, as well as his songs that had already been recorded by other artists, were included in the recording sessions, which were held at Monument Recording Studio.

Monument released Kristofferson in June 1970. Kristofferson wrote or co-wrote every song on the album. He collaborated with Marijohn's son, John Buck Wilkin, on "Blame it on the Stones". Though Kristofferson was not a commercial success, it received positive reviews from critics. According to Robert Hilburn of the Los Angeles Times, the album "is able to combine lyric sophistication with country music's traditional interest in everyday problems". The commercial success of "Sunday Mornin' Comin' Down" led to the first of several industry awards nominations for the singer. Johnny Cash's rendition of the single earned Kristofferson his first Country Music Association award for Song of the Year that November.

Also in 1970, he made his debut performance as a singer at the Los Angeles nightclub The Troubadour. Fred Roos, the casting director of Bob Rafelson's Five Easy Pieces, invited him to audition for his film debut for a leading role on Two-Lane Blacktop. Kristofferson, who was signed to Columbia Records, arrived to the appointment intoxicated and left. Kristofferson was next offered Bill L. Norton's script for Cisco Pike by Columbia. His peers encouraged him to reject the role and to take acting lessons instead, but he accepted the part, and later said; "I read the script and I could identify with this cat" and that acting is "understanding a character, and then being just as honest as you can possibly be".

Kristofferson began an 18-month tour, during which he suffered a bout of walking pneumonia, which was worsened by his alcohol consumption. While performing, he would not face the audience and mumbled the words to his songs. Eventually, he was hospitalized. During the tour, Kristofferson performed on The Johnny Cash Show. While in California, Kristofferson befriended singer Janis Joplin. Upon returning to Nashville in early 1971, he received with his mail at Combine Music Joplin's posthumous album Pearl, which at the time was still unreleased. Joplin's album included a cover of his original composition "Me and Bobby McGee". The following morning, he returned to the studio and recorded his second Monument album, The Silver Tongued Devil and I, which was released that July. He wrote nine of the album's 10 songs, including the single "Lovin' Her Was Easier (than Anything I'll Ever Do Again)". He collaborated with songwriter Shel Silverstein on "The Taker" and keyboardist Donnie Fritts on "Epitaph (Black and Blue)". Also included on the album was a cover of Bobby Bare's "Good Christian Soldier". "Lovin' Her Was Easier (than Anything I'll Ever Do Again)" reached number 46 on Billboard Hot 100 and number 4 on Adult Contemporary. These songs would later be used on the soundtrack for Cisco Pike, which was released on January 14, 1972.

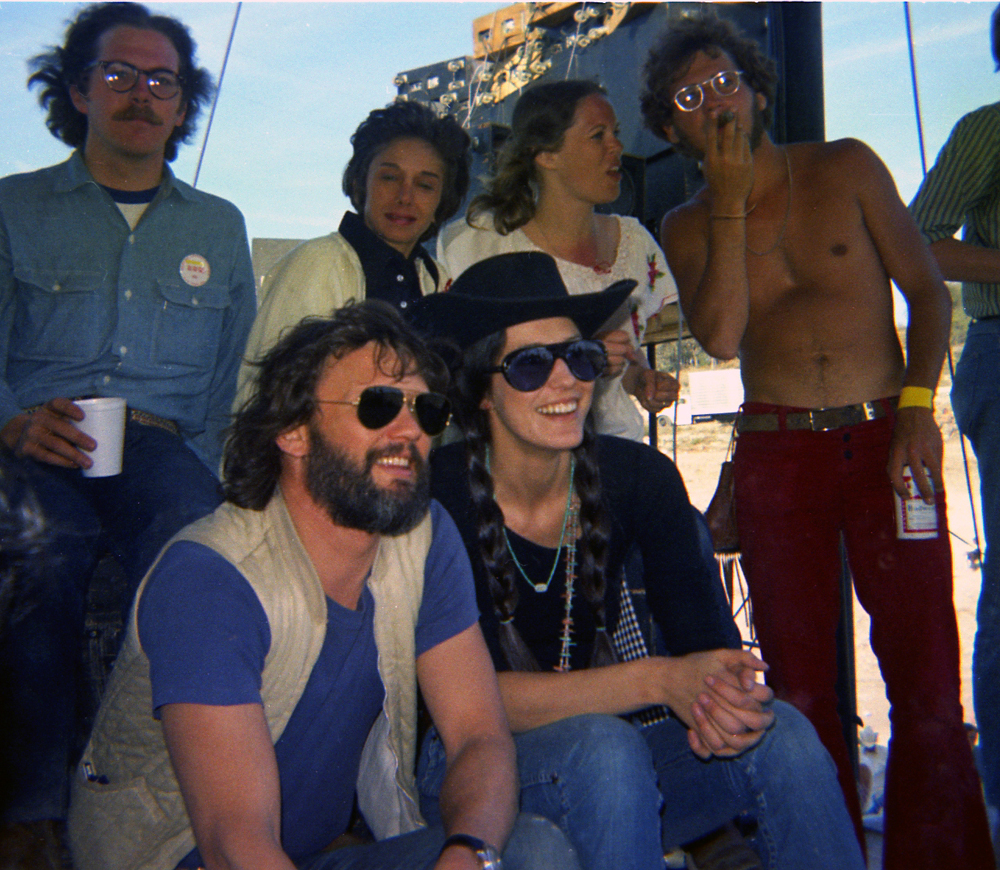
Kristofferson with Rita Coolidge at the 1972 Dripping Springs Reunion

That February, Monument released his third album Border Lord. The album was all-new material and sales were sluggish. He also swept the Grammy Awards that year with numerous songs nominated, winning country song of the year for "Help Me Make It Through the Night". Kristofferson's fourth album, Jesus Was a Capricorn, initially had slow sales, but the third single, "Why Me", was a success and significantly increased album sales. It sold over one million copies, and was awarded a gold disc by the RIAA on November 8, 1973. Kristofferson appeared with Rita Coolidge on the BBC television series The Old Grey Whistle Test, performing "Help Me Make It Through the Night". Al Green later released his version of "For the Good Times" on the album I'm Still in Love with You.

=== 1973–1985: Commercial peak ===
In April 1973, Kristofferson received an honorary doctorate in fine arts from Pomona College during Alumni Weekend, accompanied by Cash and Coolidge. Four months later, Kristofferson married Coolidge. The duo released an album titled Full Moon, another success buoyed by numerous hit singles and Grammy nominations.

His fifth album, Spooky Lady's Sideshow, released in 1974, was a commercial failure. Artists such as Ronnie Milsap, Willie Nelson and Johnny Duncan continued to record Kristofferson's material with success, but his rough vocal style and anti-pop sound kept his own audience to a minimum.

In March 1979, Kristofferson participated in the Havana Jam festival in Havana alongside several notable American and Cuban artists. His performance is captured on Ernesto Juan Castellanos's documentary Havana Jam '79. That November, Kristofferson and Coolidge appeared on The Muppet Show, where Kristofferson sang "Help Me Make It Through the Night" with Miss Piggy, Coolidge sang "We're All Alone" with forest animals, and the pair sang "Song I'd Like to Sing" with the Muppet monsters. They divorced in 1980.

In 1982, Kristofferson joined Willie Nelson, Dolly Parton, and Brenda Lee on The Winning Hand, a double album consisting of remastered and updated performances of recordings the four artists had made for the Monument label during the mid-1960s; the album reached the top ten on the U.S. country album charts. He married again, to Lisa Meyers, and concentrated on films for a time, appearing in the 1984 releases The Lost Honor of Kathryn Beck, Flashpoint, and Songwriter. Nelson and Kristofferson both appeared in Songwriter, and Kristofferson was nominated for an Academy Award for Best Original Score. The album Music from Songwriter, featuring Nelson-Kristofferson duets, was a country success.

=== Film ===
For the next several years, Kristofferson focused on acting. He appeared in Cisco Pike (1972) with Gene Hackman; Blume in Love (1973), directed by Paul Mazursky; three Sam Peckinpah films: Pat Garrett and Billy the Kid (1973), Bring Me the Head of Alfredo Garcia (1974), and Convoy (1978); and Michael Ritchie's Semi-Tough (1977) with Burt Reynolds. He continued acting in Martin Scorsese's Alice Doesn't Live Here Anymore (1974), Vigilante Force (1976), The Sailor Who Fell from Grace with the Sea (1976), and the romantic drama A Star Is Born (1976) with Barbra Streisand, for which he received a Golden Globe Award for Best Actor. At the peak of his box office power, Kristofferson turned down William Friedkin's Sorcerer (1977) and the romantic war film Hanover Street (1979). Despite his success with Streisand, Kristofferson's solo musical career headed downward with his non-charting ninth album, Shake Hands with the Devil. His next film, the two-part 1979 NBC-TV movie Freedom Road, did not get good ratings.

Kristofferson was next cast in the lead role as the enigmatic Sheriff James Averill in Michael Cimino's bleak and sprawling 1980 anti-Western Heaven's Gate. Despite being a scandalous studio-bankrupting and industry-changing failure at the time (it cost Kristofferson his Hollywood A-list status), the film gained critical recognition in subsequent years. In 1981, he co-starred with Jane Fonda in Rollover, directed by Alan J. Pakula. In 1986, he starred in The Last Days of Frank and Jesse James with Johnny Cash and Flashpoint with Treat Williams in 1984, directed by William Tannen. This was followed, in 1985, by the neo-noir thriller Trouble In Mind co-starring Keith Carradine and Lori Singer. In 1987, Kristofferson starred in the seven-episode TV series Amerika with Robert Urich and Christine Lahti. In 1989, he was the male lead in the film Millennium with Cheryl Ladd.

=== 1985–2021: Highwaymen and later years ===
Nelson and Kristofferson continued their partnership, and by 1985, they added Waylon Jennings and Johnny Cash to form the supergroup the Highwaymen. Their self-titled first album, released on May 6, was a success, and the supergroup continued working together for a time. The single from the album, a cover of Jimmy Webb's "Highwayman", was awarded the ACM's single of the year in 1985. In 1985, Kristofferson starred in Trouble in Mind and released Repossessed, a politically aware album that was a country success, particularly "They Killed Him" (also performed by Bob Dylan), a tribute to his heroes, including Martin Luther King Jr., Jesus, and Mahatma Gandhi. Kristofferson also appeared in Amerika at about the same time, a miniseries that attempted to depict life in America under Soviet control.

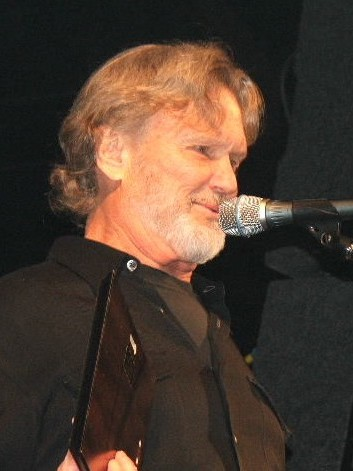
Kristofferson at the 2006 South by Southwest Festival

In spite of the success of Highwayman 2 in 1990, Kristofferson's solo recording career slipped significantly in the early 1990s, though he continued to record successfully with the Highwaymen. Lone Star (1996 film by John Sayles) reinvigorated Kristofferson's acting career, and he soon appeared in Blade, Blade II, Blade: Trinity, A Soldier's Daughter Never Cries, Fire Down Below, Tim Burton's remake of Planet of the Apes, Chelsea Walls, Payback, The Jacket, and Fast Food Nation.

The Songwriters Hall of Fame inducted Kristofferson in 1985, as had the Nashville Songwriters Hall of Fame earlier, in 1977. In 1999, The Austin Sessions was released, an album on which Kristofferson reworked some of his favorite songs with the help of artists such as Mark Knopfler, Steve Earle, and Jackson Browne. He underwent coronary artery bypass surgery shortly after the album's release.

In 1997, Kristofferson co-starred in the film Fire Down Below with Steven Seagal. Kristofferson appeared in the Stephen Norrington film Blade, alongside Wesley Snipes, as Blade's mentor Abraham Whistler. He reprised the role in Blade II (2002) and again in Blade: Trinity (2004). In 1998 he starred in Dance with Me along with Vanessa Williams and Chayanne.

In 2003, Broken Freedom Song was released, a live album recorded in San Francisco. That year, he received the "Spirit of Americana" free speech award from the Americana Music Association. In 2004, he began experiencing memory problems which lasted for the next 11 years. That November, he was inducted into the Country Music Hall of Fame.

On October 21, 2005, the film Dreamer was released, in which Kristofferson played the role of "Pop", a retired thoroughbred horse trainer. The film was inspired by the true story of the mare Mariah's Storm which won the Turfway Breeders Cup Classic. In 2006, he received the Johnny Mercer Award from the Songwriters Hall of Fame and released his first album full of new material in 11 years; This Old Road. Also in 2006, Kristofferson starred with Geneviève Bujold in the film Disappearances about whiskey running from Quebec to the U.S. during the Great Depression.

On April 21, 2007, Kristofferson won CMT's Johnny Cash Visionary Award. Rosanne Cash, Cash's daughter, presented the honor during the April 16 awards show in Nashville. Previous recipients include Cash, Hank Williams Jr., Loretta Lynn, Reba McEntire, and the Dixie Chicks. "John was my hero before he was my friend, and anything with his name on it is really an honor in my eyes," Kristofferson said during a phone interview. "I was thinking back to when I first met him, and if I ever thought that I'd be getting an award with his name on it, it would have carried me through a lot of hard times."

Kristofferson's next studio album, titled Closer to the Bone, was released in September 2009. It is produced by Don Was on the New West Records label. Before the release, Kristofferson remarked: "I like the intimacy of the new album. It has a general mood of reflecting on where we all are at this time of life." That November, Kristofferson was honored as a BMI Icon at the 57th annual BMI Country Awards. Throughout his career, Kristofferson's songwriting garnered 48 BMI Country and Pop Awards. He later remarked, "The great thing about being a songwriter is you can hear your baby interpreted by so many people that have creative talents vocally that I don't have." Kristofferson had always denied having a good voice, and had said that as he had aged, any quality it once had was beginning to decay.

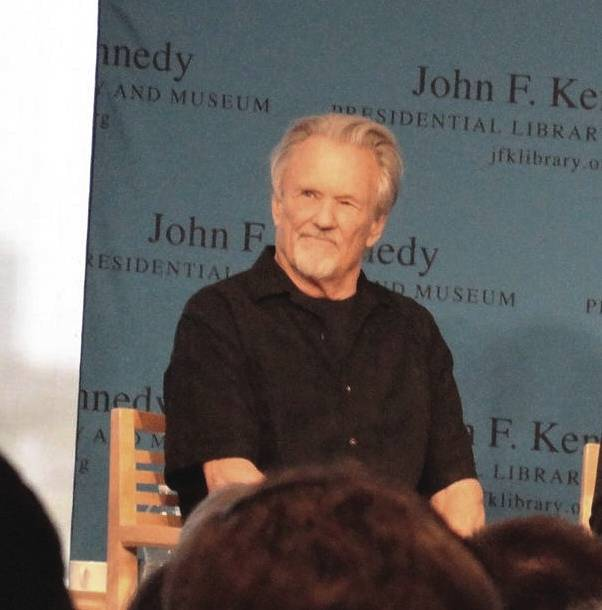
Kristofferson speaking at the 2014 PEN New England Song Lyrics Award ceremony held in Boston's John F. Kennedy Presidential Library and Museum

In May 2010, Light in the Attic Records released demos that were recorded during Kristofferson's janitorial stint at Columbia. Please Don't Tell Me How the Story Ends: The Publishing Demos was the first time these recordings were released and included material that would later be featured on other Kristofferson recordings and on the recordings of other prominent artists, such as the original recording of "Me and Bobby McGee". Also in 2010, Kristofferson voiced the character Chief Hanlon of the NCR Rangers in the video game Fallout: New Vegas.

In early 2013, Kristofferson released an album of original songs entitled Feeling Mortal. Thom Jurek of AllMusic called it "as honest a title as exists". He also praised the album's title track and "Ramblin' Jack". That June, Kristofferson portrayed Joe on the album Ghost Brothers of Darkland County, a collaboration between rock singer John Mellencamp and novelist Stephen King. In September, Kristofferson recorded an acoustic concert at Union Chapel, Islington, to be released the following year as An Evening with Kris Kristofferson: The Pilgrim; Ch 77.

In 2014, Kristofferson engaged in a series of recording sessions at Cedar Creek Recording in Austin, Texas, which led to his final studio album, The Cedar Creek Sessions. Released in June 2016, the album was nominated for a Grammy Award for Best Americana Album that December. Jeff Lincoln, in his review for the album on Country Standard Time, praised Kristofferson's humor and called the album "a songwriter's showcase".

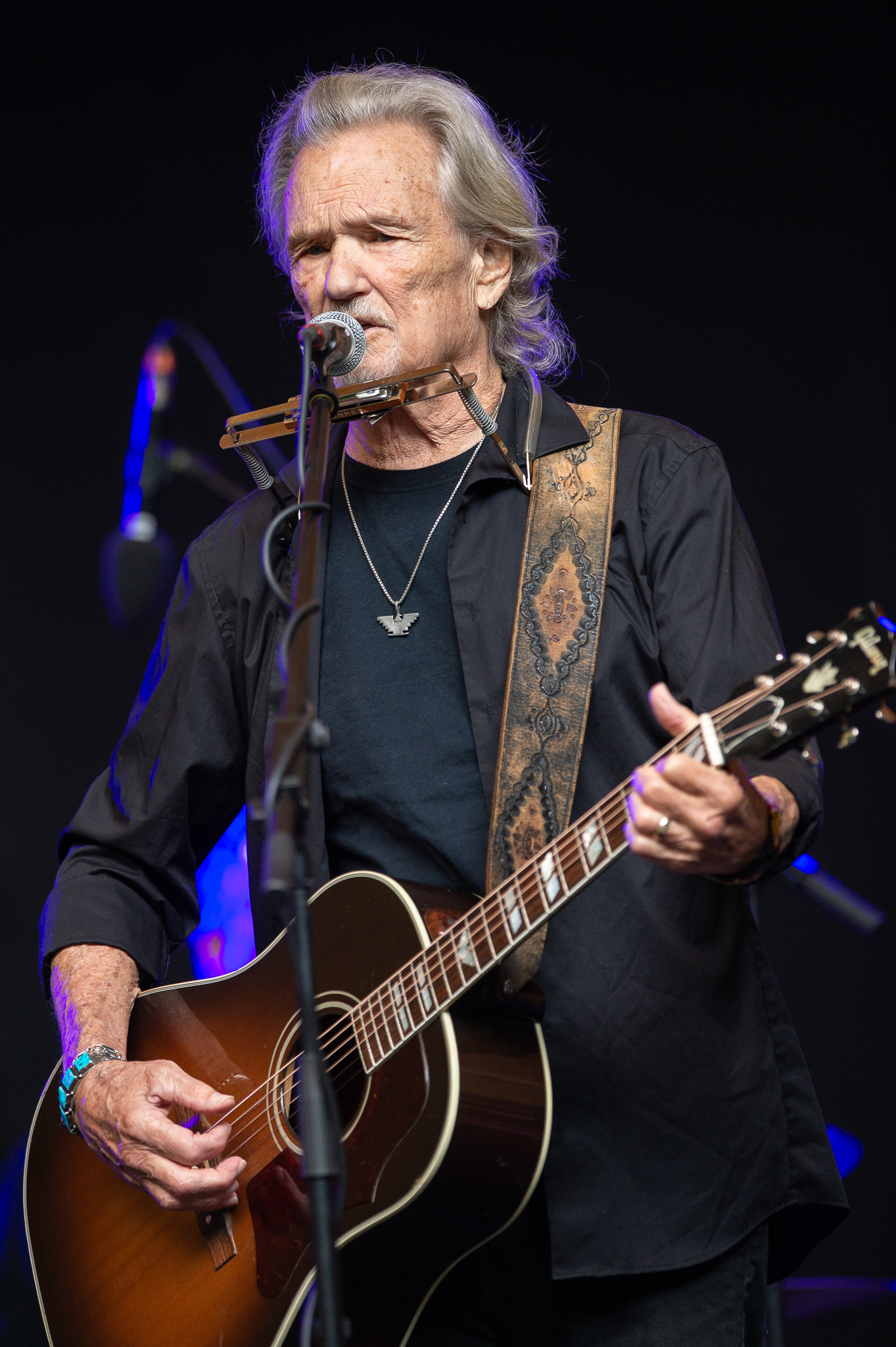
Kristofferson in June 2018

Kristofferson covered Brandi Carlile's "Turpentine" on the 2017 album Cover Stories.

In August 2018, Kristofferson's final film, Blaze, was released. That November, Kristofferson performed, with assistance from Carlile, a cover of Joni Mitchell's "A Case of You", from the 1971 Mitchell album Blue, at the Both Sides Now – Joni 75 A Birthday Celebration to celebrate Mitchell's 75th birthday.

Kristofferson was one of the supporting artists for a Barbra Streisand "exclusive European concert" on July 7, 2019 in Hyde Park, London as part of the British Summer Time concert series.

=== 2021–2024: Retirement ===
By January 2021, Kristofferson announced his retirement from performing, citing age and concerns regarding the COVID-19 pandemic. Kristofferson's final performance was held in Los Angeles at the Hollywood Bowl on April 29, 2023, where he sang a cover of "Lovin' You Was Easier" with Rosanne Cash in honor of Willie Nelson's 90th birthday; the concert was later released as Long Story Short: Willie Nelson 90 that December.

== Personal life ==
In 1961, Kristofferson married his longtime girlfriend Frances "Fran" Mavia Beer, but they divorced in 1969. Kristofferson briefly dated Janis Joplin before her death in October 1970. His second marriage was to singer Rita Coolidge in 1973, ending in divorce in 1980. Kristofferson married Lisa Meyers in 1983.

Kristofferson and Meyers owned a home in Las Flores Canyon in Malibu, California, and they also resided in Hana, Hawaii from 1990 until his death. Kristofferson had eight children from his three marriages: two from his first marriage, one from his second marriage, and five from his third marriage.

Kristofferson also had relationships outside of his marriages and fully embraced the "drugs, rocknroll life-style, leaving different sets of women to raise all eight of his kids."

=== Political views and advocacy ===
Kristofferson was a vocal opponent of the Gulf War and Iraq War and a critic of a number of United States military interventions and foreign policy positions, including the United States invasion of Panama and U.S. support of the Contras during the Nicaraguan Revolution .

Kristofferson endorsed Jesse Jackson's presidential campaign in 1988 and Ross Perot's presidential campaign in 1992.

Kristofferson's debut studio album included a pro–Vietnam War song, but he said that he later became an opponent of the war after speaking with returning soldiers who had seen combat. Speaking about a soldier who had told him that he had witnessed other soldiers throwing people out of helicopters during interrogation, Kristofferson said, "The notion that you could make a young person do something so inhumane to another soldier—or even worse, a civilian—convinced me that we were in the wrong." Kristofferson called himself a "dove with claws" and remained proud of his military service in spite of his anti-war views.

In a 1991 interview on New Zealand TV, he condemned media support for the Gulf War, saying "The lapdog media cranks out propaganda that would make a Nazi blush." Kristofferson was a supporter of the United Farm Workers and appeared at several rallies and benefits for them, campaigning with Cesar Chavez for the passage of Proposition 14. He continued to play at benefits for the UFW through the 2010s. In 1987, he played at a benefit concert for Leonard Peltier with Jackson Browne, Willie Nelson and Joni Mitchell. In 1995, he dedicated a song to Mumia Abu-Jamal at a concert in Philadelphia, and was booed by the crowd.

He performed in benefit concerts for Palestinian children, and stated in 2009 that he "found a considerable lack of work as a result." At a Bob Dylan anniversary concert shortly after Sinéad O'Connor's protest on Saturday Night Live in 1992, he showed solidarity with her when she was booed by the crowd.

== Death ==
Kristofferson died in his Hana, Hawaii, home on September 28, 2024, at the age of 88. His family did not provide a cause of death. He had requested for the first three lines of Leonard Cohen's "Bird on the Wire" on his tombstone:

Like a bird on the wire
Like a drunk in a midnight choir
I have tried in my way to be free

Family and associates, including Dolly Parton, Reba McEntire and Miranda Lambert, paid tribute to Kristofferson on social media, while media outlets also published tributes written by singers Willie Nelson and Ashley McBryde. Many other musicians, artists, and celebrities offered public acknowledgments.

== Discography ==
Studio albums

- Kristofferson (1970)
- The Silver Tongued Devil and I (1971)
- Border Lord (1972)
- Jesus Was a Capricorn (1972)
- Full Moon (with Rita Coolidge) (1973)
- Spooky Lady's Sideshow (1974)
- Breakaway (with Rita Coolidge) (1974)
- Who's to Bless and Who's to Blame (1975)
- Surreal Thing (1976)
- Easter Island (1978)
- Natural Act (with Rita Coolidge) (1978)
- Shake Hands with the Devil (1979)
- To the Bone (1981)
- Repossessed (1986)
- Third World Warrior (1990)
- A Moment of Forever (1995)
- The Austin Sessions (1999)
- This Old Road (2006)
- Closer to the Bone (2009)
- Feeling Mortal (2013)
- The Cedar Creek Sessions (2016)

== Filmography ==
Films starred

- The Last Movie (1971)
- Cisco Pike (1972)
- Pat Garrett and Billy the Kid (1973)
- Blume in Love (1973)
- Alice Doesn't Live Here Anymore (1974)
- A Star Is Born (1976)
- The Sailor Who Fell from Grace with the Sea (1976)
- Vigilante Force (1976)
- Semi-Tough (1977)
- Convoy (1978)
- Heaven's Gate (1980)
- Rollover (1981)
- Flashpoint (1984)
- Big Top Pee-wee (1988)
- Millennium (1989)
- Lone Star (1996)
- Blade (1998)
- A Soldier's Daughter Never Cries (1998)
- Payback (1999)
- Molokai: The Story of Father Damien (1999)
- Planet of the Apes (2001)
- Blade II (2002)
- Blade: Trinity (2004)
- Dreamer: Inspired by a True Story (2005)
- He's Just Not That Into You (2009)
- Bloodworth (2010)
- Dolphin Tale (2011)
- Dolphin Tale 2 (2014)

== Awards and nominations ==
Year	Association	Category	Nominated work	Result
1970	Country Music Association Awards	Song of the Year	"Sunday Mornin' Comin' Down"	Won
1973	Country Music Association Awards	Song of the Year	"Why Me"	Nominated
1973	Country Music Association Awards	Single of the Year	"Why Me"	Nominated
1973	Academy of Country Music Awards	Song of the Year	"Why Me"	Nominated
1973	BAFTA Awards	Best Newcomer	Pat Garrett and Billy the Kid	Nominated
1974	Academy of Country Music Awards	Song of the Year	"One Day at a Time"	Nominated
1976	Golden Globe Awards	Best Actor in a Musical	A Star Is Born	Won
1984	Academy Awards	Best Original Score	Songwriter	Nominated
1985	Country Music Association Awards	Single of the Year	"Highwayman"	Nominated
1985	Country Music Association Awards	Video of the Year	"Highwayman"	Nominated
1985	Academy of Country Music Awards	Single of the Year	"Highwayman"	Won
1985	Academy of Country Music Awards	Video of the Year	"Highwayman"	Nominated
1985	Academy of Country Music Awards	Album of the Year	"Highwayman"	Nominated
2003	Americana Music Honors & Awards	Free Speech Award	Himself	Won
2005	Academy of Country Music Awards	Cliffie Stone Pioneer Award	Himself	Won
2013	Academy of Country Music Awards	Poets Award	Himself	Won
2019	Country Music Association Awards	Lifetime Achievement Award	Himself	Won

=== Grammy Awards ===
Kristofferson has won three competitive Grammys from thirteen nominations. He received the Lifetime Achievement Award in 2014.

Year	Category	Nominated work	Result
1971	Song of the Year	"Me and Bobby McGee"	Nominated
1971	Song of the Year	"Help Me Make It Through the Night"	Nominated
1971	Best Country Song	"Help Me Make It Through the Night"	Won
1971	Best Country Song	"Me and Bobby McGee"	Nominated
1971	Best Country Song	"For the Good Times"	Nominated
1973	Best Country Song	"Why Me"	Nominated
1973	Best Male Country Vocal Performance	"Why Me"	Nominated
1973	Best Country Performance by a Duo or Group	"From The Bottle To The Bottom" (with Rita Coolidge)	Won
1974	Best Country Performance by a Duo or Group	"Loving Arms" (with Rita Coolidge)	Nominated
1975	Best Country Performance by a Duo or Group	"Lover Please" (with Rita Coolidge)	Won
1985	Best Country Performance by a Duo or Group	"Highwayman" (with the Highwaymen)	Nominated
1990	Grammy Award for Best Country Collaboration with Vocals	Highwayman 2	Nominated
2014	Grammy Lifetime Achievement Award	Himself	Won
2016	Best Americana Album	The Cedar Creek Sessions	Nominated

== Sources ==
- Burke, Tom (April 1974). "Kris Kristofferson's Talking Blues". Rolling Stone.
- Edmondson, Jacqueline (2013). Music in American Life: An Encyclopedia of the Songs, Styles, Stars, and Stories that Shaped our Culture. ABC-CLIO. ISBN 978-0-313-39348-8.
- Hurd, Mary (2015). Kris Kristofferson: Country Highwayman. Rowman & Littlefield. ISBN 978-0-810-88821-0.
- Hurst, Jack (September 6, 1970). "Kristofferson Beats the Devil". The Tennessean. Vol. 65, no. 131. pp. 3–5 – via Newspapers.com.
- Larkin, Colin (2006). The Encyclopedia of Popular Music. MUZE. ISBN 978-0-195-31373-4.
- Miller, Stephen (2009). Kristofferson: The Wild American. Omnibus Press. ISBN 978-0-857-12109-7.
- Streissguth, Michael (2013). Outlaw: Waylon, Willie, Kris, and the Renegades of Nashville. Harper Collins. ISBN 978-0-062-03820-3.
- Thibodeaux, Ron (2006). "He made it through the night". New Orleans Times-Picayune. Georges Media Group. Archived from the original on September 30, 2007.
- Thomson, Graeme (June 22, 2016). "Kris Kristofferson: "I'm sure I made some stupid mistakes..."". Uncut.

Awards
Preceded by Johnny Cash	First Amendment Center/AMA "Spirit of Americana" Free Speech Award; 2003	Succeeded by Steve Earle
