= Donnie Fritts =

American singer-songwriter (1942–2019)

- Fritts in 2014

Background information
- Born: Donald Ray Fritts; November 8, 1942; Florence, Alabama, U.S.
- Died: August 27, 2019 (aged 76) Birmingham, Alabama, U.S.
- Occupations: Session musician, songwriter
- Instrument: Keyboard

Donald Ray Fritts (November 8, 1942 – August 27, 2019) was an American session musician and songwriter. A recording artist in his own right, he was Kris Kristofferson's keyboardist for over forty years. In 2008, he was inducted into the Alabama Music Hall of Fame.

== Early career ==
He began playing drums in local bands such as The Satellites and Hollis Dixon & the Keynotes at age 15, and later developed into a session keyboard player.

Working closely with Rick Hall, Billy Sherrill, Dan Penn, Arthur Alexander, David Briggs, Jerry Carrigan and Norbert Putnam, Fritts was involved in many of the early songs and recordings created in the Muscle Shoals music industry.

== Kris Kristofferson ==
In 1965, Fritts signed with a Nashville publishing company. Songs which he wrote were recorded by Charlie Rich and Jerry Lee Lewis. He later met Kris Kristofferson who was just beginning a career in songwriting. When forming his band, Kristofferson called on Fritts, who continued as his keyboard player for over two decades, performing live, on recordings and in numerous movies.

Through his association with Kristofferson, Fritts appeared in three of Sam Peckinpah's movies: Pat Garrett & Billy the Kid, Bring Me the Head of Alfredo Garcia, and Convoy as well as appearing in other movies including A Star Is Born and Songwriter.

== Recording artist ==
In 1974, Kristofferson and producer Jerry Wexler co-produced Prone to Lean at Muscle Shoals Sound Studio. Everybody's Got a Song was released in 1998. The album included guest appearances by Willie Nelson, Kris Kristofferson, Dan Penn, Spooner Oldham, Waylon Jennings, Delbert McClinton, Tony Joe White, Leroy Parnell & John Prine. It would be another ten years before Fritts released his third album One Foot in the Groove in 2008 produced by Dan Penn with Ron Laury, recorded at Dandy Studio in Nashville.

In 2014, he appeared on Country Funk Vol. II, a compilation album from Light in the Attic. In 2015, he signed with Single Lock Records.

== Death ==
Fritts died from complications of heart surgery on August 27, 2019, at a hospital in Birmingham, Alabama.

== Discography ==
- Prone to Lean (1974)
- Everybody's Got a Song (1997)
- One Foot in the Groove (2008)
- Oh My Goodness (2015)
- June (A Tribute to Arthur Alexander) (2018)

== Chart songs as a songwriter ==
Song title	Recording artist	US Chart	Year
"Breakfast in Bed"	UB40 featuring Chrissie Hynde	8	1988
"Breakfast in Bed"	Dusty Springfield	91	1969
"Easy To Love"	Joe Simon	12	1977
"You're Gonna Love Yourself in the Morning"	Bonnie Koloc	12	1974
"You're Gonna Love Yourself in the Morning"	Charlie Rich	22	1980
"Choo Choo Train"	The Box Tops	26	1968
"We Had It All"	Waylon Jennings	28	1973
"We Had It All"	Dolly Parton	28	1986
"You're Gonna Love Yourself in the Morning"	Roy Clark	35	1975

== Cultural references ==
Kris Kristofferson’s song "The Pilgrim - Chapter 33" (1971) opens with a dedication to Funky Donnie Fritts, Billy Swan, Jerry Jeff Walker, and Johnny Cash.

Jerry Jeff Walker's 1975 song "Pissin' in the Wind" opens with a dedication to Kris Kristofferson, Johnny Cash, "Funky Donnie Fritts", and Billy Swan.

John Prine's song "The Oldest Baby In the World" from the album "John Prine Live" opens with a reference to "Funky Donnie Fritts" who co-wrote the song.
