= Stephen Bruton =

American musician (1948–2009)

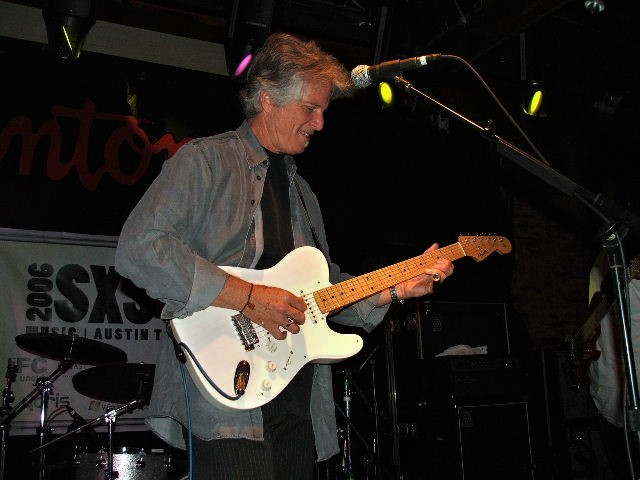
Stephen Bruton at Antone's in Austin, TX during SXSW 2006.

Turner Stephen Bruton (November 7, 1948 – May 9, 2009) was an American actor and musician.

== Background ==
Born in Wilmington, Delaware, United States, he moved with his family to Texas at the age of two. He fell into the Fort Worth music scene after graduating from Texas Christian University when he joined Kris Kristofferson's band as the latter's career was about to take off; their collaboration and friendship lasted more than 40 years.

== Career ==
Bruton worked with such artists and musicians as NRBQ, T Bone Burnett, Bonnie Raitt, Gene Clark, Rita Coolidge, Christine McVie, Elvis Costello, Delbert McClinton, Sonny Landreth and Carly Simon. He produced albums for Alejandro Escovedo, Marcia Ball, Jimmie Dale Gilmore, Hal Ketchum, Storyville, Kris Kristofferson, Chris Smither, Ray Wylie Hubbard, and Hellbillies.

From 1993 to 2005 he released five solo albums of his own work, as well as three with Austin, Texas, songwriters The Resentments.

The concert film Road to Austin was recorded on May 19, 2007, when Bruton and many of his musical friends performed for 20,000 people in Austin, Texas. The film was released in 2014, and includes interviews with Bruton and others.

In late 2006, Bruton was diagnosed with cancer. His friends thought some time in the studio might be a welcome distraction. Dubbing themselves Geoff Muldaur and the Texas Sheiks, Geoff Muldaur (guitar, vocals), Cindy Cashdollar (dobro), Suzy Thompson (fiddle), Johnny Nicholas (guitar) and Bruce Hughes (bass) joined Bruton in the studio for a pair of recording sessions. Bruton died in May 2009; however, the album was released September 22, 2009, on the Tradition & Moderne label.

He made appearances in films and television, as well, and he co-wrote and performed with Burnett much of the music in the 2009 country music film Crazy Heart, which was released in December and dedicated to Bruton's memory.

On Kristofferson's 2009 release Closer to the Bone, Bruton is credited with playing bass and mandolin and providing backing vocals. Kristofferson noted: "This album is dedicated to the spirit of my soul-brother Stephen Bruton and his unique legacy of music and laughter that has enriched our lives."

In June 2012, Little Feat released Rooster Rag (Hot Tomato/Rounder Records), containing a collaboration, "Just a Fever", that he wrote with group guitarist Paul Barrere. They were frequent writing partners.

== Death ==
Bruton died of complications of throat cancer in Los Angeles on May 9, 2009, aged 60. He was buried at Mount Olivet Cemetery in Fort Worth, Texas.

== Discography ==
- What It Is (Dos Records, 1993)
- Right on Time (Windsong Records, 1995)
- Swingmasters Revue with Michael Price (Shel-Tone, 1996)
- Nothing but the Truth (New West Records, 1999)
- Spirit World (New West, 2002)
- From the Five (New West, 2005)

== See also ==
- Music of Austin
