= Songs of Kristofferson =

Compilation album by Kris Kristofferson
- Released: 1977
- Genre: Country
- Label: Monument
- Producers: Fred Foster, David Anderle

Kris Kristofferson chronology
A Star Is Born (1976)	Songs of Kristofferson (1977)	Easter Island (1978)

Professional ratings
Review scores
Source	Rating
AllMusic	4/5 stars
Christgau's Record Guide	C

Songs of Kristofferson is a best-of compilation album by Kris Kristofferson, released in 1977, after he had become more well known as a movie star than as a singer-songwriter. It includes tracks from his albums Kristofferson, The Silver Tongued Devil and I, Jesus Was a Capricorn, Who's to Bless and Who's to Blame and Surreal Thing. The album was re-released on CD in 1990.

The original LP sleeve featured liner notes by longtime Village Voice critic Nat Hentoff.

== Track listing ==
All songs by Kris Kristofferson except as indicated.

=== Side one ===
1. "The Silver-Tongued Devil"
2. "Loving Her Was Easier (than Anything I'll Ever Do Again)"
3. "Me and Bobby McGee" (Kristofferson, Fred Foster)
4. "Help Me Make It Through the Night"
5. "For the Good Times"
6. "Sunday Morning Comin' Down"

=== Side two ===
1. "You Show Me Yours (and I'll Show You Mine)"
2. "The Pilgrim: Chapter 33 (Hang In, Hopper)"
3. "Stranger"
4. "I Got a Life of My Own"
5. "Why Me"
6. "Who's to Bless and Who's to Blame"

== Charts ==
Chart performance for Songs of Kristofferson
Chart (1975)	Peak position
Canada Top Albums/CDs (RPM)	35
US Billboard 200	45
US Top Country Albums (Billboard)	8

== Certifications and sales ==
Certifications for Songs of Kristofferson
Region	Certification	Certified units/sales
United States (RIAA)	Gold	500,000^{^}
^{^} Shipments figures based on certification alone.
