= The Lady's Not for Sale =

The Lady's Not For Sale

Studio album by Rita Coolidge
- Released: October 1972
- Studio: Wally Heider Recording Studio, Los Angeles; Sunset Sound, Hollywood, California
- Genre: Pop
- Length: 43:49
- Label: A&M and MFP
- Producer: David Anderle for Willow Productions

Rita Coolidge chronology
Nice Feelin' (1971)	The Lady's Not For Sale (1972)	Full Moon (1973)

Professional ratings
Review scores
Source	Rating
Christgau's Record Guide	C

The Lady's Not For Sale is a 1972 album by Rita Coolidge, and was released on the A&M Records label, AMLH 64370. It was later reissued on the Music For Pleasure label, MFP-50500. The inner gatefold photo was shot on location by Terry Paul (Kris Kristofferson’s bass player) at Stonehenge in the English county of Wiltshire.

== Track listing ==
=== Side one ===
1. "My Crew" (Priscilla Jones, Booker T. Jones) – 4:53
2. "Fever" (Johnny Davenport, Eddie Cooley) – 3:28
3. "Bird on the Wire" (Leonard Cohen) – 5:39
4. "I'll Be Your Baby Tonight" (Bob Dylan) – 3:15
5. "A Woman Left Lonely" (Spooner Oldham, Dan Penn) – 5:05

=== Side two ===
1. "Whiskey Whiskey" (Tom Ghent) – 4:00
2. "Everybody Loves a Winner" (William Bell, Booker T. Jones) – 4:04
3. "Donut Man" (Marc Benno, Irwin Benno) – 3:25
4. "Inside of Me" (Marc Benno, Irwin Benno, Michael Utley) – 6:35
5. "The Lady's Not for Sale" (Kris Kristofferson, Carol Pugh) – 4:10

== Personnel ==
- Rita Coolidge - vocals
- Marc Benno, Bernie Leadon, Charlie Freeman - guitar
- Al Perkins - rhythm guitar, pedal steel, National slide guitar
- Al Kooper - lead guitar on "The Lady's Not for Sale"
- Jerry McGee - acoustic guitar on "My Crew"
- Sneaky Pete Kleinow - steel guitar on "A Woman Left Lonely" and "Donut Man"
- Carl Radle, Lee Sklar, Tommy McClure - bass
- Michael Utley - keyboards
- Jim Keltner, Russell Kunkel, Sammy Creason - drums
- Booker T. Jones - flute on "My Crew", backing vocals on "Everybody Loves a Winner"
- John Sebastian - harmonica on "I'll Be Your Baby Tonight"
- Donna Weiss, Priscilla Jones, Maxine Willard Waters, Sherlie Matthews, Venetta Fields - backing vocals
- Kris Kristofferson - backing vocals and arrangement on "Whiskey, Whiskey"

Technical
Front & Back Cover Photography - Bob Jenkins
Inside Photograph - Terry Paul
Art Direction - Roland Young
Album Design - Chuck Beeson
Recording Engineers: Glyn Johns, John Haeny, Richard Moore
Re-mix Engineer, David Anderle

"The producer of this album would especially like to thank Marc Benno and Kris Kristofferson for their inspiration."

== Charts ==
Chart (1972)	Position
US Billboard 200	46
