= Full Moon (Kris Kristofferson and Rita Coolidge album) =

Studio album by Kris Kristofferson and Rita Coolidge
- Released: September 1973
- Studios: Sunset Sound, Los Angeles, California
- Genre: Country
- Length: 41:51
- Label: A&M
- Producer: David Anderle

Kris Kristofferson chronology
Jesus Was a Capricorn (1972)	Full Moon (1973)	Spooky Lady's Sideshow (1974)

Rita Coolidge chronology
The Lady's Not for Sale (1972)	Full Moon (1973)	Fall into Spring (1974)

Professional ratings
Review scores
Source	Rating
AllMusic	4/5 stars

Full Moon is a duet album by Kris Kristofferson and Rita Coolidge, released in September 1973 on A&M Records. It is the first of three duet albums by the couple, who married weeks before the album's release. Unlike Kristofferson's solo albums, it features several covers.

The album was only ever reissued once, on CD in Japan, until an expanded edition was released by Real Gone Music on June 2, 2017.

== Background ==
Only weeks before Full Moon's release, Kristofferson and Coolidge got married. Coolidge had contributed vocals to Kristofferson's previous two albums, including two duets on Jesus Was a Capricorn. At the time Kristofferson was the bigger star, having just topped the country charts with the gospel song "Why Me," and topped the country album charts with its parent album Jesus Was a Capricorn. Coolidge's previous release, 1972's The Lady's Not for Sale, reached number 43 on the U.S. pop charts. (The title track of the album was co-written by Kristofferson.) In 2016 Krisofferson spoke about the album to Uncut's Graeme Thomson:

I think it was probably my idea. I love singing with people anyway, and I loved to sing with Rita together in harmony. I grew up with the Everly Brothers, harmony was always something I loved, and Rita sang backup with people all the time. Harmony came easily for both of us, it was very natural. I haven't listened to this in a long time, but I think the songs were more or less what we felt we wanted to do and what the producer David Anderle felt we could do well. It was a very different thing to what I was used to. We recorded it at Sunset Sound in LA – different city, different producer...We worked well together at first, and it hadn't gotten to where we were fighting – yet.

Since they were on different record labels, Monument and A&M came to an agreement to take turns releasing the album, with Coolidge's A&M going first with Full Moon.

== Recording and composition ==
Full Moon was produced by Coolidge's producer David Anderle. As noted by William Ruhlmann in his AllMusic review of the album, "Despite Kristofferson's greater celebrity, the LP was made with Coolidge's strengths in mind. David Anderle, its producer, was her producer, and it was released on her record label, A&M. The songs were set in her key, with Kristofferson crooning along in an unusually high register. The tempos were mostly slow, emphasizing the dreamy quality of Coolidge's voice." The pair co-wrote two songs for the LP, which was made up of mostly love songs. Although Kristofferson was a well-known writer in country music in the early seventies, Full Moon contains material from other writers, including Kristofferson keyboardist Donnie Fritts, Tony Joe White, Larry Murray, and Tom Jans. The album was a departure musically for Kristofferson, whose albums became more polished since his debut, and this trend continued with Full Moon, as noted by biographer Stephen Miller:

Musically, it moved Kristofferson closer to pop and rock music – with a folksy streak – of easy listening variety. Lyrically there was a marked degree of dumbing down by the standards of his solo albums. Gone were the literary allusions, deep imagery and social conscience. In their place was a collection of mainly laid-back songs about love and relationships, a reflection of the singers' main passions at the time...The jarring contrast between Kristofferson and Coolidge's voices was one of the album's most striking features...Kristofferson croons along, attempting, though not succeeding, to soften his gruff style. It was like a musical mismatch of beauty and the beast.

The couple would release two more duet albums, Breakaway in 1974 and Natural Act in 1978.

== Reception ==
Buoyed by the news of their wedding and the Caribbean-flavored single "A Song I'd Like to Sing" reaching the U.S. Top 40 pop chart, as well as the country and easy listening charts, Full Moon became a number one country album. "From the Bottle to the Bottom" won the Grammy Award for Best Country Vocal Performance by a Duo or Group in 1974.

== Track listing ==
1. "Hard to Be Friends" (Larry Murray) – 3:25
2. "It's All Over (All Over Again)" (Coolidge, Kristofferson) – 2:45
3. "I Never Had It So Good" (Roger Nichols, Paul Williams) – 4:08
4. "From the Bottle to the Bottom" (Kristofferson) – 4:06
5. "Take Time to Love" (Donnie Fritts, Tony Joe White) – 2:55
6. "Tennessee Blues" (Bobby Charles) – 5:20
7. "Part of Your Life" (Allan Rich, Margaret Ann Rich) – 3:09
8. "I'm Down (But I Keep Falling)" (Coolidge, Kristofferson) – 3:08
9. "I Heard the Bluebirds Sing" (Hod Pharis) – 2:48
10. "After the Fact" (Stephen Bruton) – 5:05
11. "Loving Arms" (Tom Jans) – 3:50
12. "A Song I'd Like to Sing" (Kristofferson) – 4:00

== Personnel ==
- Kris Kristofferson, Rita Coolidge – all vocals
- Michael Utley – keyboards
- Sammy Creason – drums
- Donnie Fritts – keyboards
- Stephen Bruton – guitar
- Terry Paul – bass
- Leland Sklar – bass
- Jerry McGee – guitar, harmonica
- Bobbye Hall – percussion
- David Bromberg – guitar
- Nick DeCaro – accordion
- David Smith – musician
- Gary Scruggs – bass guitar, harmonica
- Randy Scruggs – guitar
- Vassar Clements – fiddle
- Josh Graves – dobro
- Booker T. Jones – keyboards
- Herb Alpert – trumpet
- Strings arranged by David Campbell and Norman Kurban & performed by the Campbell-Kurban String Section

== Production ==
- Produced by David Anderle
- Recorded at Sunset Sound Studios, Los Angeles, California
- Recording engineer: John Haeny
- Mixing engineer: David Anderle
- Mixing assistant: Rick Tarantini
- Mastered at Mastering Lab, by Doug Sax
- Art direction by Roland Young
- Album design by Paula Bard
- All photos by Bob Jenkins

== Charts ==
Chart performance for Full Moon
Chart (1973–1974)	Peak position
Australian Albums (Kent Music Report)	40
Canada Top Albums/CDs (RPM)	7
US Billboard 200	26
US Top Country Albums (Billboard)	1

== Certifications and sales ==
Region	Certification	Certified units/sales
United States (RIAA)	Gold	500,000^{^}
^{^} Shipments figures based on certification alone.
