= Nice Feelin' =

Studio album by Rita Coolidge
- Released: November 1971
- Studio: A&M (Hollywood, California); Wally Heider (Hollywood, California); Island Studios (London, UK)
- Genre: Pop
- Length: 35:41
- Label: A&M
- Producer: David Anderle for Willow Productions

Rita Coolidge chronology
Rita Coolidge (1971)	Nice Feelin' (1971)	The Lady's Not for Sale (1972)

Nice Feelin' is the second album by Rita Coolidge. It was released in 1971. The album was produced by David Anderle, with The Dixie Flyers serving as the studio band.

== Track listing ==
=== Side one ===
1. "Family Full of Soul" (Marc Benno) – 2:56
2. "You Touched Me in the Morning" (Michael Utley, Steve Bogard) – 3:20
3. "If You Were Mine" (Jimmy Lewis) – 3:37
4. "Nice Feelin'" (Marc Benno) – 5:26
5. "Only You Know and I Know" (Dave Mason) – 3:36

=== Side two ===
1. "I'll Be Here" (Jimmy Lewis) – 4:21
2. "Better Days" (Graham Nash) – 3:07
3. "Lay My Burden Down" (Michael Utley, Steve Bogard) – 3:59
4. "Most Likely You Go Your Way (And I'll Go Mine)" (Bob Dylan) – 4:10
5. "Journey Through the Past" (Neil Young) – 3:27

== Personnel ==
- Rita Coolidge – vocals, piano on "Journey Through the Past"

The Dixie Flyers

- Marc Benno – guitar, vocals
- Charlie Freeman – guitar
- Michael Utley – keyboards
- Tommy McClure – bass
- Sammy Creason – drums
- Al Kooper – organ on "I'll Be Here"
- Nick DeCaro – accordion on "Journey Through the Past"
- Don Brooks – harmonica on "Only You Know and I Know", "Better Days" and "Most Likely You Go Your Way (And I'll Go Mine)"
- Rusty Young – steel guitar on "You Touched Me in the Morning"

Technical

- Recording Engineers: Bruce Botnick at A&M Studios, Glyn Johns & Richard Moore at Wally Heider Studios
- Remix Engineer: Glyn Johns at Island Studios, London.
- Special Thanks to Tony Platt at Island Studios
- Art Direction: Roland Young
- Inside Cover Photograph: Ethan A. Russell
- Front and Back Cover Photographs: Bob Jenkins
- Lettering: Wayne Kimball
- Direction: Ronald Stone

== Charts ==
Chart (1971)	Position
US Billboard 200	135
