= Fall into Spring =

1974 album by Rita Coolidge

Studio album by Rita Coolidge
- Released: April 1974
- Studio: Sunset Sound, Los Angeles, California
- Genre: Pop
- Length: 46:14
- Label: A&M
- Producer: David Anderle

Rita Coolidge chronology
Full Moon (1973)	Fall into Spring (1974)	Breakaway (1974)

Fall into Spring is a 1974 album by Rita Coolidge and was released on the A&M Records label.

== Track listing ==
=== Side one ===
1. "Love Has No Pride" (Eric Kaz, Libby Titus) — 3:50
2. "That's What Friends Are For" (Paul Williams) — 4:55
3. "Cowboys and Indians" (Bobby Charles) — 3:15
4. "Hold an Old Friend's Hand" (Donna Weiss) — 4:10
5. "We Had It All" (Troy Seals, Donnie Fritts) — 3:00
6. "Mama Lou" (Larry Murray) — 3:13

=== Side two ===
1. "Heaven's Dream" (Marc Benno) — 2:25
2. "Desperados Waiting for the Train" (Guy Clark) — 5:15
3. "A Nickel For The Fiddler" (Guy Clark) — 2:50
4. "The Burden of Freedom" (Kris Kristofferson) — 5:14
5. "Now Your Baby Is a Lady" (Donna Weiss, Jackie DeShannon) — 2:40
6. "I Feel Like Going Home" (Charlie Rich) — 5.27

== Personnel ==
- Rita Coolidge – vocals
- Dean Parks – acoustic and electric guitars, slide guitar, mandolin, dobro
- Jerry McGee – acoustic and electric guitar, harmonica
- Mike Utley – keyboards
- Lee Sklar – bass
- Sammy Creason – drums
- Bobbye Hall – percussion
- Al Perkins – pedal steel guitar
- Nick DeCaro – accordion
- Milt Holland – vibraphone, marimbas
- Gib Guilbeau – fiddle
- Herb Pedersen – banjo
- Geoff Levin – dobro and energy bow on "Desperados Waiting For the Train"
- Booker T. Jones – piano and vocal on "Hold An Old Friend's Hand"
- Jennifer Warren, Brooks Hunnicutt, Rita Jean Bodine, Linda Dillard, Kenny Edwards, Andrew Gold, Donna Weiss, Booker T. Jones, Priscilla Jones – vocals on "Desperados Waiting For The Train"
- David Campbell – orchestral arrangements

Technical

- John Haeny, Ric Tarantini, Kent Nebergall, Brian Dall'armil – recording engineer
- David Anderle; with aid & assistance from Brian Dall'armi and Kent Nebergall – remixing engineer
- Roland Young – art direction
- Chuck Beeson – design
- Gina Fiore – photography

== Charts ==
Chart (1974)	Peak position
Australian (Kent Music Report)	96
US Billboard 200	55
