= Fever (Little Willie John song) =

1956 single by Little Willie John

- Label of US 78 RPM release

Single by Little Willie John

from the album Fever
- B-side: "Letter from My Darling"
- Released: May 1956
- Genre: Rhythm and blues
- Length: 2:40
- Label: King 4935
- Songwriters: Eddie Cooley; John Davenport
- Producer: Henry Glover

Little Willie John singles chronology
"Need Your Love So Bad" (1955)	"Fever" (1956)	"Do Something for Me" (1956)

"Fever" is a song written by Eddie Cooley and Otis Blackwell, who used the pseudonym "John Davenport". It was originally recorded by the American R&B singer Little Willie John for his debut album, Fever (1956), and released as a single in April of the same year. The song topped the Billboard R&B Best Sellers in the US and peaked at number 24 on the Billboard pop chart. It was received positively by music critics and was included on several lists of the best songs when it was released.

It has been covered by several artists from diverse genres. Peggy Lee's 1958 rendition became the best-known version and her signature song. Lee's version contained rewritten lyrics and an altered music arrangement. It was a top-five hit in the UK and Australia in addition to making the top ten in the US and the Netherlands. "Fever" was nominated in three categories at the 1st Annual Grammy Awards in 1959, including Record of the Year and Song of the Year.

Notable versions of "Fever" were recorded by Elvis Presley, the Cramps, Madonna, Michael Bublé, Bette Midler, Amanda Lear, the McCoys, Leon Russell, La Lupe and Beyoncé.

Madonna released it as a single from her fifth album, Erotica (1992), in March 1993 through Warner Bros. It topped the Finnish Singles Chart and the Hot Dance Club Play chart in the US, in addition to charting in the top 50 in many other countries. Madonna filmed and released a music video directed by Stéphane Sednaoui and performed the song on several television shows as well as her 1993 The Girlie Show World Tour. "Fever" has featured in many films, plays and television shows.

== Background and reception ==
The idea for "Fever" was presented to Otis Blackwell by an old friend, Eddie Cooley, who had a hit song called "Priscilla" in 1956. Blackwell said: "Eddie Cooley was a friend of mine from New York and he called me up and said 'Man, I got an idea for a song called 'Fever', but I can't finish it.' I had to write it under another name because, at that time, I was still under contract to Joe Davis." John Davenport, the name he used, was the name of Blackwell's stepfather. Little Willie John reportedly disliked the song, but was persuaded to record it, on March 1, 1956, by King Records owner Syd Nathan and arranger and producer Henry Glover. It became the title track for his debut album, Fever, released in 1956. "Fever" is a soul and rhythm and blues minor key opus with an arrangement consisting of low saxophones played by Ray Felder and Rufus "Nose" Gore and guitar by Bill Jennings. The vocal style of Willie John is similar to moaning and he is backed by finger snaps. Bill Dahl from the website AllMusic noted a contrast between the song's "ominous" arrangement and the vocals along with the finger snapping which "marginally lightened the mood".

"Fever" was released as a single in April 1956 and became a double-sided hit along with the top-ten R&B song "Letter from My Darling". "Fever" was number one for three weeks on the Billboard R&B Best Sellers chart in the United States, peaking at the top on July 21, 1956. It also made the pop charts, peaking at number 24 on the Billboard Best Sellers in Stores. The single sold one million copies in the US. The song won the BMI Award for Best R&B song.

The song was included in Robert Christgau's "Basic Record Library" of 1950s and 1960s recordings, published in Christgau's Record Guide: Rock Albums of the Seventies (1981). He later described it as a very "fervid" song. Bill Dahl from the website AllMusic credited "Fever" for winning the "boisterous teen an across-the-board audience" for Willie John. The writer further opined that the singer's "sweaty case of love-rooted 'Fever' was seemingly grave, judging from his riveting intensity, yet he doesn't sound like he minds at all". New Musical Express magazine listed "Fever" as the 96th best song of the 1950s. In his The 1001 Greatest Singles Ever Made list published in 1989, critic Dave Marsh ranked "Fever" at the position of 109. The song was included on the greatest hits albums Fever: The Best of Little Willie John (1993) and The Very Best of Little Willie John (2001).

== Charts ==
Chart (1956)	Peak position
US Billboard The Top 100	27
US Best Sellers in Stores (Billboard)	24
US R&B Best Sellers in Stores (Billboard)	1
US Most Played R&B by Jockeys (Billboard)	1
US R&B Most Played in Juke Boxes (Billboard)	1

== Peggy Lee version ==
"Fever"
- Label of the US vinyl single

Single by Peggy Lee
- B-side: "You Don't Know"
- Released: June 1958
- Recorded: May 19, 1958
- Studio: Capitol Records (Hollywood, California)
- Genre: Jazz; R&B
- Length: 3:21
- Label: Capitol
- Songwriters: Peggy Lee; Eddie Cooley; John Davenport
- Producers: Eddie Cooley; John Davenport

Peggy Lee singles chronology
"Joey, Joey, Joey" (1956)	"Fever" (1958)	"Light of Love" (1958)

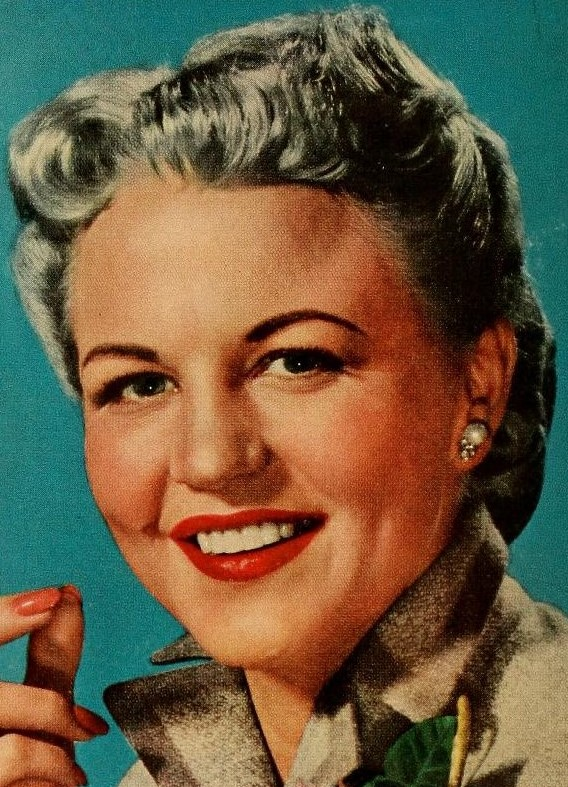
Peggy Lee, who recorded a version of "Fever" with altered lyrics

=== Background and composition ===
In May 1958, Peggy Lee recorded a cover version of "Fever" in Hollywood, which featured significantly rewritten lyrics composed by Lee herself without credit. The song was not included on Lee's album, Things Are Swingin', when it was first released in 1959, but was listed as a bonus track on its 2004 reissue release. The uncopyrighted lyrics by Lee featured historical invocations (including the verses beginning "Romeo loved Juliet", and "Captain Smith and Pocahontas") and are now generally thought of as a standard part of the song, having been included in most subsequent covers of "Fever".

Lee's cover, arranged by the singer herself with arranger/conductor Jack Marshall, was described as being in "torchy lounge" mode, accompanied only by upright bass (played by Joe Mondragon) and a very limited drum set (played in part with fingers by Shelly Manne), while the finger snaps were provided either by the singer herself, by Howard Roberts, the guitarist for the date, who set aside his guitar for this number, or possibly even by the producer, Dave Cavanaugh. Lee's rendition was further described as "smooth, sultry". It is written in the key of A Minor in a medium swing tempo with 135 beats per minute. Lee's vocals span from the musical note of G_{3} to B_{4}.

=== Reception and accolades ===
A writer of the website NPR deemed "Fever" Lee's "most memorable tune" and considered it to be "slinky and inimitable". He went on to note that it displayed characteristics which were most remembered about the singer – "her playful delivery, charisma and sexuality". John Bush from the website AllMusic opined that the singer excelled in sounding "sizzling" in the song. John Fordham, writing for The Guardian, felt that the "heated" atmosphere heard on Lee's version of "Fever", "has an underlying suggestion that the person raising the temperature for her right now doesn't have to be the one doing it next week".

Lee's version peaked at number eight on the Billboard Hot 100 in the US and spent a total of 12 weeks on that chart. It was her only top 10 hit on the Hot 100. It reached a peak of number five on the UK Singles Chart, where it first appeared on August 15, 1958. A reissue of the single charted again in 1992, appearing at number 75 and staying for only one week. Elsewhere in Europe, Lee's "Fever" peaked at number eight on January 3, 1959, on the Dutch Singles Chart in Netherlands for five consecutive weeks before falling off the chart. The song also peaked at number two on the Australian Singles Chart compiled by Kent Music Report, and emerged as the twentieth-best-selling single of 1958 in that country.

"Fever" was nominated in the categories for Record of the Year, Song of the Year and Best Female Vocal Performance at the 1st Annual Grammy Awards held in 1959. The track became Lee's signature song and her best-known work, in addition to becoming her most successful hit. It was ranked at number 100 in the book and the accompanying list 1001 Songs You Must Hear Before You Die by Robert Dimery.

=== Charts ===
==== Weekly charts ====
Chart (1958)	Peak position
Australia (Kent Music Report)	2
Canada (CHUM Chart)	11
Netherlands (Single Top 100)	8
UK Singles (Official Charts)	5
US Billboard Hot 100	8
US Hot R&B/Hip-Hop Songs (Billboard)	5

Chart (1992)	Position
UK Singles (Official Charts) Reissue version	75

==== Year-end charts ====
Chart (1958)	Position
Australia (Kent Music Report)	20
US Billboard Hot 100	76

=== Certifications ===
Region	Certification	Certified units/sales
United Kingdom (BPI)	Silver	200,000^{‡}
^{‡} Sales+streaming figures based on certification alone.

== Madonna version ==
"Fever"
- Artwork for all commercial non-US releases

Single by Madonna

from the album Erotica
- Released: March 22, 1993
- Recorded: August 15, 1992
- Studio: Soundworks (New York)
- Genre: Dance; house; deep house
- Length: 5:00
- Label: Maverick; Sire; Warner Bros.
- Songwriters: Eddie Cooley; John Davenport; Peggy Lee (uncredited)
- Producers: Madonna; Shep Pettibone

Madonna singles chronology
"Bad Girl" (1993)	"Fever" (1993)	"Rain" (1993)

Music video
- "Fever" on YouTube

=== Background and composition ===
In 1992, American singer and songwriter Madonna recorded a cover version of "Fever" for her fifth studio album, Erotica (1992). It was released as a single on March 22, 1993, in Europe and Australia by Maverick, Sire and Warner Bros. Madonna served as a producer for the song along with Shep Pettibone. She was in the studio putting down tracks for the album and had just recorded a song called "Goodbye to Innocence". She was going through the final stages of production on the song and suddenly started singing the lyrics to "Fever" over "Goodbye to Innocence". Madonna liked the way it sounded so much that she recorded it. In September 2008, Madonna's version was used in television promos for the fifth season of Desperate Housewives.

According to author Rikky Rooksby, Madonna changed the composition of the original version by adding drum rhythms, accompanied by a beatbox sound like snare drums. Removing the chord progression of the original, Madonna introduces original lyrics into the song. Instrumentation of the track includes strings, marimba and finger-pops at various intervals throughout. Rooksby noticed that Madonna sang with a distant and disembodied voice, and relegated it to the dance music accompanying the lyrics.

=== Chart performance ===
In the United States, "Fever" was not released as a commercial single. It was released promotionally and became a dance hit, becoming Madonna's 15th song to hit number one on the Billboard Hot Dance Club Play chart. It topped the chart for the issue dated May 15, 1993, in its seventh week of ascending. In the United Kingdom, the song debuted at its peak position of number six on the UK Singles Chart on the issue dated April 3, 1993, and had sold 86,077 copies by August 2008. It peaked at number one on the Finnish Singles Chart on April 15, 1993. In Ireland it entered the top ten of the Irish Singles Chart, peaking at the position of six and charting for four weeks. Elsewhere, it peaked at numbers 12 in Italy, 17 in Israel and New Zealand, 22 on the Ultratop chart of the Flanders region in Belgium, 31 in France and 51 in Australia.

=== Critical reception ===
The Baltimore Sun's J. D. Considine praised the song as a "sassy, house-style remake" of the original version. He noted that when Madonna and the team of producers that worked on the album "push beyond the expected... [it] really heats up, providing a sound that is body-conscious in the best sense of the term", exemplifying his statements with "Fever". A writer from Billboard called the song a "house-inflected rendition" and noted it was single-worthy. In August 2018, the magazine named it as the singer's 66th greatest single; "while most versions of this classic smolder, Madonna gets distant and detached, delivering an icy club banger that sounds less like a torch song from yesteryear and more like a soundtrack for anonymous encounters that would make Ms. Lee blush". Hunter Hauk from the Dallas Observer deemed it "subtly soulful and custom made for Madonna's pre-vocal-lesson voice". David Browne of Entertainment Weekly criticized Madonna's voice as "souless", "You and Shep sure do a bang-up job – pun intended – transforming 'Fever,' that old Peggy Lee hit, into a techno drone, but listen to the parched sound emitted from your throat on such tracks. It's cold, deadened, remote." Jude Rogers from The Guardian called it an "unnecessary trance-era update of pop's most achingly simple song about sex"; nonetheless, she placed the song at number 72 on her ranking of Madonna's singles, in honor of her 60th birthday.

In his weekly UK chart commentary, James Masterton stated that "her crown is intact." Alan Jones from Music Week gave it a score of four out of five and named it Pick of the Week, adding that "this is fairly tame in original album edit, but packs more punch and dancefloor possibilities in selection of Pettihone [sic]/Falcon/Gaeten mixes, and should maintain her now record sequence of consecutive Top 10 hits." The New York Times editor Stephen Holden wrote that "the album's softer moments include a silky hip-hop arrangement of 'Fever'". Author Rikky Rooksby, described it as "unsexy", and called it a "sterile track" which is "certainly misplaced as the second track of [Erotica]". Slant Magazine' Sal Cinquemani opined that it's "Madonna's vocal performance that's the real star here [...] she may lack Peggy Lee's command, but she exudes a detached confidence and control that is the pitch-perfect embodiment of Erotica's main thesis: love hurts". Alfred Soto of Stylus Magazine felt that this song has its unique, idiosyncratic energy which he compared with material by Joni Mitchell from her album Blue (1971). The Washington Post's Richard Harrington deemed it a "cool mechanical recitation in which more attention is paid to the pulse of the music than that of the heart."

=== Music video and live performances ===
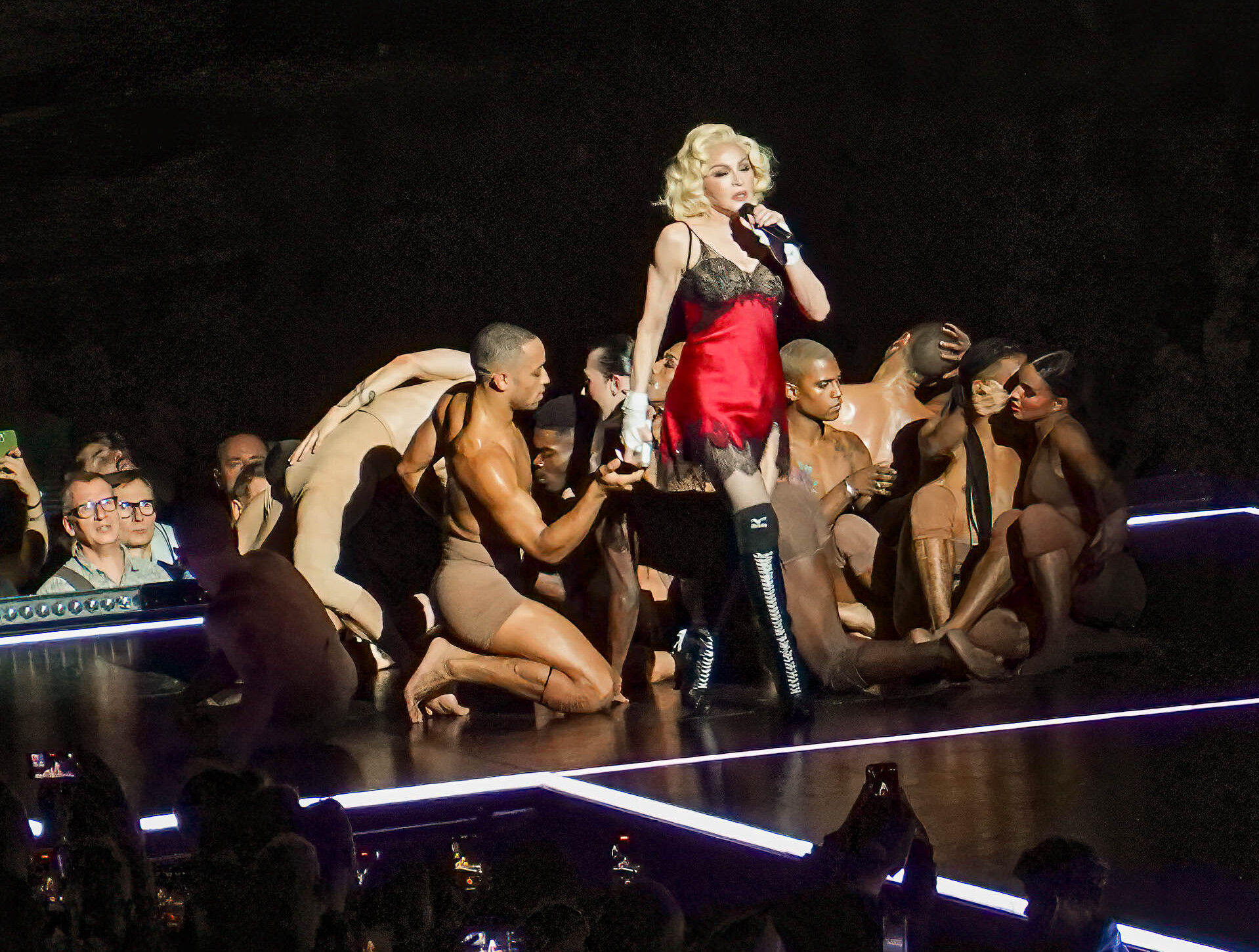
Madonna singing "Fever" on the Celebration Tour (2023—2024)

The accompanying music video for "Fever", directed by French director Stéphane Sednaoui, was shot on April 10–11, 1993 at Greenwich Studios in Miami, Florida, and received its world premiere on May 11, 1993, on MTV. It has since been made commercially available on the DVD collection, The Video Collection 93:99. The music video uses the "Edit One" version of the song; it alternately features Madonna with a red wig and silver bodypaint in a variety of costumes dancing in front of funky, kaleidoscopic backgrounds. It showcases her posing like ancient goddesses. She is enveloped in a flame-like atmosphere and eventually burns up. According to Sednaoui, he wanted to portray the singer "like a provocative saint, somebody that speaks out and tells the truth, and is ready to burn for it"; he also recalled that the executives from Maverick wanted to do "something that's not the [Madonna] we know – more pop, more disco, more club [...] that's why she went all the way, like, 'OK, let's paint'". Charles Aaron writing for Spin magazine classified the clip as "dub". The music video for "Fever" was later made available on Madonna's official YouTube channel in February 2018. It was digitally remastered on November 22, 2022, and had generated more than 3.2 million views as of early 2024.

To start the promotion for Erotica, Madonna performed "Fever" and "Bad Girl" on Saturday Night Live in January 1993. During the 1000th The Arsenio Hall Show, Madonna performed the original version of "Fever" accompanied by a band, wearing a black classic dress and smoking a cigarette. Madonna also performed "Fever" on the 1993 Girlie Show World Tour as the second song from the setlist. After "Erotica", the singer partially strips and proceeds to straddle and dances suggestively with two half-naked male dancers. At the end of the song, Madonna and the two backup dancers descend into a literal ring of fire. On October 8, 2015, Madonna performed an a cappella version of "Fever" during the Saint Paul stop of her Rebel Heart Tour. She later performed the song on her 2023-2024 Celebration Tour; it was also used on one of the interludes on the show.

=== Formats and track listings ===
- UK 7" picture disc single
1. "Fever" (Album Edit) – 4:27
2. "Fever" (Radio Edit) – 5:11
- Australian, European, and UK CD maxi-single
1. "Fever" (Album Edit) – 4:30
2. "Fever" (Hot Sweat 12-inch Mix) – 7:58
3. "Fever" (Extended 12-inch Mix) – 6:07
4. "Fever" (Shep's Remedy Dub) – 4:31
5. "Fever" (Murk Boys Miami Mix) – 7:10
6. "Fever" (Murk Boys Deep South Mix) – 6:28
- Digital single – "Bad Girl / Fever" (2022)
1. "Bad Girl" (Edit) – 4:35
2. "Bad Girl" (Extended Mix) – 6:29
3. "Fever" (Album Edit) – 4:30
4. "Fever" (Edit One) – 4:05
5. "Fever" (Extended 12-inch Mix) – 6:07
6. "Fever" (Hot Sweat 12-inch Mix) – 7:58
7. "Fever" (Murk Boys Deep South Mix) – 6:28
8. "Fever" (Murk Boys Miami Mix) – 7:10
9. "Fever" (Murk Boys Miami Dub) – 7:12
10. "Fever" (Radio Edit/Remix) – 5:09
11. "Fever" (Shep's Remedy Dub) – 4:31
12. "Fever" (Oscar G's Dope Mix) – 4:55

=== Charts ===
==== Weekly charts ====
Chart (1993)	Peak position
Australia (ARIA)	51
Belgium (Ultratop 50 Flanders)	38
Europe (Eurochart Hot 100)	26
Europe (European Hit Radio)	40
Finland (Suomen virallinen lista)	1
France (SNEP)	31
Iceland (Íslenski Listinn Topp 40)	23
Ireland (IRMA)	6
Israel (Israeli Singles Chart)	17
Italy (Musica e dischi)	12
Netherlands (Dutch Top 40 Tipparade)	22
Netherlands (Single Top 100 Tipparade)	5
New Zealand (Recorded Music NZ)	17
UK Singles (Official Charts)	6
UK Airplay (Music Week)	2
UK Dance (Music Week)	14
UK (MRIB)	5
US Dance Club Songs (Billboard)	1
US Dance Singles Sales (Billboard) With "Bad Girl"	1

==== Year-end charts ====
Chart (1993)	Position
US Hot Dance Club Play (Billboard)	44
US Hot Maxi-Singles Sales (Billboard)	46

== Beyoncé version ==
"Fever"

Promotional single by Beyoncé

from the album Heat
- Released: February 8, 2010
- Recorded: 2010
- Studio: Coty, Inc. (Paris, France)
- Genre: R&B; soul
- Length: 3:32
- Label: Columbia
- Songwriters: John Davenport; Eddie Cooley; Peggy Lee (uncredited)
- Producers: Chink Santana; Beyoncé Knowles

=== Background and release ===
American singer Beyoncé included her version of "Fever" on multiple releases. Her original recording of the song was included on the soundtrack album for the 2003 American musical dramedy film, The Fighting Temptations, in which she also had a leading role. The song was also featured in the film itself, during a scene in which the character Beyoncé portrayed, named Lilly, sang the song in a nightclub while her eventual love interest Darrin (played by Cuba Gooding, Jr.) watches her. Beyoncé's version was produced by Damon Elliott and was recorded by her while she was still working on the 2002 film Austin Powers in Goldmember. Elliott suggested to the singer to record "Fever" as it was one of his favorite songs. When she got a role in The Fighting Temptations, the song seemed "perfect" for it as stated by Elliot. Ed Gonzalez of Slant Magazine provided a positive review for the cover, saying: "The seductive iciness of Peggy Lee's 'Fever' is successfully transplanted with a gumbo sound and sexy Southern comfort."

Beyoncé appeared on The Tonight Show with Jay Leno on September 17, 2003, to promote The Fighting Temptations with a live performance of "Fever". In November 2003, the song was included in the set list of the singer's first headlining solo Dangerously in Love Tour. Beyoncé was backed by four male dancers dressed in white, performing a choreography with her. In a review of the show, Dave Simpson from The Guardian felt that the performance of "Fever" was "a note perfect if pointless version" of the original. In 2004, the song was included on the live album Live at Wembley which was filmed during a London concert as part of the tour. Beyoncé's original recording was additionally included on the track-listing of her first mixtape Speak My Mind released in 2005.

After releasing her first fragrance Heat, Beyoncé re-recorded her version of "Fever" as promotion for the fragrance, using the song in its advertisements. The re-recorded 2010 version of the song was produced by Chink Santana and Beyoncé herself. It was released for digital download on the iTunes Store in the US on February 8, 2010. The next day, it was released in the United Kingdom. In February the following year, "Fever" was included on the track-listing of the extended play (EP) Heat, a limited CD released with the perfume.

=== Usage in media ===
As promotion for the fragrance, a TV commercial for Heat was directed by Jake Nava, who had previously worked with Beyoncé on various of her music videos. The commercial features Beyoncé in a red satin dress sweating in a steamy room while the 2010 cover version of "Fever" plays in the background. Throughout the clip, she is seen lying naked in the middle of a room, touching her body, dancing and leaving a trail of fire as she touches a wall. The commercial concludes with Beyoncé walking away from the camera and melting the floor with her footprints. During the end, she turns and says "Catch the fever", the tagline of the fragrance.

In an interview with Women's Wear Daily, the singer described the sexual tone of the video stating: "My sexiest moments are when I'm just getting out of the tub or the shower and I'm clean, so I wanted to incorporate that in the ads. The dress was this liquid-y satin. The song Fever I did years ago and always loved it. [For the commercial] I got to sing it a bit more whispery, more natural." The silky red dress she wears in the video has been noted for exposing partial cleavage. The commercial for the fragrance found controversy in the United Kingdom with the Advertising Standards Authority where it was banned from daytime TV rotation for its "sexy imagery".

== Other notable versions ==
- Elvis Presley recorded his version on April 3, 1960, and was released in April 8, 1960, on the Elvis Is Back! album. In January 14, 1973, Presley performed the song in Honolulu International Center for the concert Aloha from Hawaii via Satellite. In 2015, the 1960 studio version was given an orchestral arrangement by the Royal Philharmonic Orchestra, in a posthumous duet with Canadian singer Michael Bublé, and was released on the album If I Can Dream.
- Helen Shapiro recorded a version of "Fever" in 1964; her cover reached number 38 on the UK Singles Chart on January 23 of the same year.
- The McCoys in 1965 released a version similar to their previous hit "Hang On Sloopy". The McCoys' version of "Fever" peaked at number seven on the Billboard Hot 100 and 34 on the German Singles Chart.
- James Brown – Cold Sweat (1967). Music critic Robert Christgau opined that "Fever" placed on the album with several other cover versions "smelled a little fishy at the time".
- La Lupe – Queen of Latin Soul (1968). Her version became famous worldwide. On the web site NBCNewYork.com Elizabeth Bougerol called it one of the best versions and essential at Boogaloo parties.
- 1969 Chicago Cubs – A version of the song with the same music but different lyrics, called "Pennant Fever", was recorded by seven members of the 1969 Chicago Cubs: Billy Williams, Randy Hundley, Ron Santo, Don Kessinger, Willie Smith, Gene Oliver, and Nate Oliver.
- Rita Coolidge – for The Lady's Not for Sale (1972) and it became a minor hit in her early career.
- Suzi Quatro included her own version of "Fever" on Your Mamma Won't Like Me in 1975. Dave Thompson from AllMusic called her cover "lukewarm".
- Rita Moreno and The Muppets performed the song in a comedy gag on The Muppet Show in 1976. This version featured a humorous exchange between Moreno and Animal, the Muppet drummer. This version has inspired other versions performed as tributes to the classic 1976 Muppet Show performance.
- Madleen Kane released her version in 1978, and it peaked at No. 19 on the Canadian Dance Chart.
- Indian singer Usha Uthup performed the song on various of her concerts (including those in 2010) and included it on the album Usha in Nairobi released in 1978.
- Lizzy Mercier Descloux recorded a parody of the song entitled "Tumor" on her 1979 album Press Color.
- The Cramps covered "Fever" on their debut album Songs the Lord Taught Us (1980) It was praised by Ned Raggett of AllMusic who felt that it challenged the original.
- Amanda Lear recorded the song as a single-only track in 1982. "Red Tape" from the previous year's Incognito album made the B-side. The music video was shot in Paris and sees Amanda performing the song on a boat on the Seine. The song was performed several times on German and Italian television.
- Annabella Lwin recorded the song in 1986 for her first solo album after the breakup of Bow Wow Wow, and it provided the title for the album itself. A music video was released for the song.
- Anne Murray recorded a version of the song for her album Croonin' (1993)
- Michael Bublé released his cover of this song on his self named debut album in 2003. Aaron Latham at AllMusic considered it one of the highlights on the album, stating that Bublé "gives it a satiny sheen that the song hasn't seen in years".
- Bette Midler from her 2005 album Bette Midler Sings the Peggy Lee Songbook. In 2006 it reached No. 4 on the U.S. Billboard Dance Chart.
- Lulu Roman – At Last (2013)
- Arielle Dombasle covered the song in 2022 and is part of her 2024 release Iconics.
- Sergio George, Elena Rose, Oscar D'Leon, Skip Marley – Me Das Fever (2025)

== In other media ==
- On January 30, 2018, reality TV star Dorit Kemsley performed a version of the song with pop star friend Boy George on The Real Housewives of Beverly Hills.

== See also ==
- List of Billboard number-one rhythm and blues hits
- List of Billboard Hot 100 top 10 singles in 1958
- List of Top 25 singles for 1958 in Australia
- List of number-one dance singles of 1993 (U.S.)
- List of number-one singles of 1993 (Finland)
