= Asylum Choir II =

Studio album by the Asylum Choir
- Released: November 15, 1971
- Recorded: February 1967 – April 1969
- Studios: Skyhill, Hollywood
- Length: 33:52
- Labels: Shelter, The Right Stuff
- Producers: Leon Russell, Marc Benno

Leon Russell chronology
Leon Russell and the Shelter People (1971)	Asylum Choir II (1971)	Carney (1972)

Professional ratings
Review scores
Source	Rating
AllMusic	2.5/5 stars
Christgau's Record Guide	B
Encyclopedia of Popular Music	2/5 stars

Asylum Choir II is the second and final album, after the 1968 debut Look Inside the Asylum Choir, of the studio aggregation consisting of Leon Russell and Marc Benno. It was recorded and expected to be released in 1969, but legal issues held up its release for two years. The 1990 digitally remastered CD re-release contains as bonus cuts all but three of the tracks from their first album.

== Track listing ==
All tracks composed by Leon Russell and Marc Benno except where indicated

Side one

1. "Sweet Home Chicago" – 3:20
2. "Down on the Base" – 2:18
3. "Hello, Little Friend" (Russell) – 2:52
4. "Salty Candy" – 2:26
5. "Tryin' to Stay 'Live" – 2:50

Side two

1. "Intro to Rita" – 2:07
2. "Straight Brother" – 3:08
3. "Learn How to Boogie" – 2:40
4. "Ballad for a Soldier" (Russell) – 4:25
5. "When You Wish upon a Fag" (Russell) – 4:10
6. "Lady in Waiting" (Russell) – 3:37

The CD re-issue contains the following bonus tracks:

1. "Welcome to Hollywood" – 2:35
2. "Death of the Flowers" (Russell, Benno, Greg Dempsey) – 2:08
3. "Icicle Star Tree" – 2:55
4. Medley: "N.Y. Op", "Land of Dog", "Henri the Clown" – 6:07
5. "Soul Food" (Russell, Benno, Bill Boatman, Jimmy Markham) – 2:05

== Charts ==
Chart (1971/72)	Peak position
Australia (Kent Music Report)	55
United States (Billboard 200)	70

== Personnel ==
- Marc Benno – guitars, vocals
- Leon Russell – bass, guitar, keyboards, piano, vocals
- Jesse Ed Davis – guitars
- Chuck Blackwell – drums
- Carl Radle – bass
- Donald Dunn – bass
