= A Star Is Born (1976 soundtrack) =

Soundtrack album by Barbra Streisand and Kris Kristofferson

Soundtrack album by Barbra Streisand and Kris Kristofferson
- Released: November 1976
- Recorded: 1975–1976
- Venues: The Handlebar (Tempe); Sun Devil Stadium (Tempe); Grady Gammage Auditorium
- Studio: A&M (Hollywood)
- Genre: Classic pop
- Length: 41:31
- Label: Columbia
- Producers: Barbra Streisand; Phil Ramone

Barbra Streisand chronology
Classical Barbra (1976)	A Star Is Born (1976)	Superman (1977)

Kris Kristofferson chronology
Surreal Thing (1976)	A Star Is Born (1976)	Songs of Kristofferson (1977)

Singles from A Star Is Born
- 1. "Evergreen (Love Theme from A Star Is Born)" Released: December 1976; 2. "Watch Closely Now" Released: May 1977

Professional ratings
Review scores
Source	Rating
AllMusic	2/5 stars
Rolling Stone	Unfavorable
The Village Voice	D+

A Star Is Born is the soundtrack album to the 1976 musical film of the same name, performed by its stars Barbra Streisand and Kris Kristofferson. The album was very successful, holding the number-one spot on the US Billboard 200 chart for six weeks and eventually was certified 4× Platinum by the RIAA for more than four million units shipped and has sold a total of eight million copies worldwide. It additionally topped the UK Albums Chart and became the first number-one album credited to a solo female artist there.

"Evergreen (Love Theme from A Star Is Born)" was released as the album's lead single and became Streisand's second US number one single, spending three weeks at the top of the Billboard Hot 100 and six weeks atop the easy listening chart.

According to the liner notes of Streisand's compilation box set Just for the Record, the album also received a record certification in New Zealand, Brazil, the Netherlands, Italy and Mexico. The import version of the CD adds the Spanish version of "Evergreen" as a bonus track.

== Track listing ==
1. "Watch Closely Now" (Paul Williams, Kenny Ascher) – 3:49
2. "Queen Bee" (Rupert Holmes) – 3:55
3. "Everything" (Holmes, Williams) – 3:50
4. "Lost Inside of You" (Barbra Streisand, Leon Russell) – 2:54
5. "Hellacious Acres" (Williams, Ascher) – 2:58
6. "Evergreen (Love Theme from A Star Is Born)" (Streisand, Williams) – 3:04
7. "The Woman in the Moon" (Williams, Ascher) – 4:49
8. "I Believe in Love" (Kenny Loggins, Alan and Marilyn Bergman) – 3:13
9. "Crippled Crow" (Donna Weiss) – 3:30
10. Finale: "With One More Look at You" / "Watch Closely Now" (Williams, Ascher) – 7:43
11. Reprise: "Evergreen (Love Theme from A Star Is Born)" – 1:46
12. "Evergreen (Love theme from A Star Is Born)" (Spanish version) – 3:05 (Import version only)

Notes

- The songs that appear on the soundtrack are in most cases alternate (live) and studio recordings that do not appear in the film. The alternate version of "Lost Inside of You" that actually appears in the movie was finally released in 1991 as part of the 4-CD Barbra Streisand Anthology Just for the Record. A previously unreleased studio version of the track appeared on her 1982 compilation Memories. It was later re-recorded as a duet with Babyface for her 2014 duets album Partners.
- While the majority of songs on the soundtrack had been written specifically for A Star Is Born, "Crippled Crow" is the exception, having appeared two years prior to the movie's release on Kris Kristofferson's and Rita Coolidge's album Breakaway. While the original version of "Crippled Crow" is a duet, the movie version is sung solely by Kristofferson.
- An alternative previously unreleased studio version of the track "With One More Look at You" appears on Streisand's 2012 retrospective Release Me.

== Personnel ==
The Speedway

- Art Munson, Bobby Shew, Booker T. Jones, Charles Owens, Dean Hagen, Donnie Fritts, Jack Redmond, Jerry McGee, Michael Utley, Sammy Creason, Stephen Bruton, Terry Paul – performers

The Oreos

- Clydie King, Vanetta Fields – backing vocals

with:

- Ian Freebairn-Smith, James Pankow, Kenny Ascher, Patrick Williams, Roger Kellaway, Tom Scott – orchestration
- Jules Chaikin – musical contractor
- Francesco Scavullo – front cover photography

== Charts ==
=== Weekly charts ===
Chart (1976–77)	Peak position
Australian Albums (Kent Music Report)	3
Canada Top Albums/CDs (RPM)	1
Dutch Albums (Album Top 100)	7
Finnish Albums (Suomen virallinen lista)	9
Japanese Albums (Oricon)	9
New Zealand Albums (RMNZ)	1
Norwegian Albums (VG-lista)	10
Swedish Albums (Sverigetopplistan)	22
UK Albums (Official Charts)	1
US Billboard 200	1

=== Year-end charts ===
Chart (1977)	Position
Australian Albums (Kent Music Report)	11
New Zealand Albums (RMNZ)	4
UK Albums (OCC)	4
US Billboard 200	3
US Cash Box	7

== Certifications and sales ==
Region	Certification	Certified units/sales
Australia (ARIA)	2× Platinum	140,000^{‡}
Canada (Music Canada)	3× Platinum	300,000^{^}
Hong Kong (IFPI Hong Kong)	Gold	10,000^{*}
Japan	—	59,690
United Kingdom (BPI)	Platinum	300,000^{^}
United States (RIAA)	4× Platinum	4,000,000^{^}
^{*} Sales figures based on certification alone.^{^} Shipments figures based on certification alone.^{‡} Sales+streaming figures based on certification alone.
