= Spooky Lady's Sideshow =

Studio album by Kris Kristofferson
- Released: May 1974
- Recorded: 1974
- Studios: Sunset Sound, Los Angeles, California
- Genre: Outlaw Country
- Length: 46:25
- Label: Monument
- Producer: David Anderle

Kris Kristofferson chronology
Full Moon (1973)	Spooky Lady's Sideshow (1974)	Breakaway (1974)

Professional ratings
Review scores
Source	Rating
Allmusic	3.5/5 stars
Rolling Stone	(mixed)

Spooky Lady's Sideshow is the fifth solo album by Kris Kristofferson, released in 1974 on Monument Records. It was preceded and followed by duet albums with his wife, Rita Coolidge. It was recorded shortly after Kristofferson's appearance in the movie Pat Garrett and Billy the Kid. The album mostly consists of songs about decline due to alcohol and drug abuse. That theme of decline proved to be (unintentionally) prophetic as this was Kristofferson's first album that failed to see commercial success on a large scale.

== Background ==
1973 was Kristofferson's apex with respect to commercial success. His duet album with wife Rita Coolidge topped the country albums chart, and his previous solo albums, Jesus Was a Capricorn, went gold, largely thanks to the surprise gospel smash "Why Me". In addition to being one of the most successful and respected songwriters in the business, Kristofferson was also a movie star, having appeared in Blume in Love and starring in Sam Peckinpah’s Pat Garret and Billy the Kid. Although Kristofferson commercial stock was high, some reviewers contended that the quality of his songwriting was slipping due to his preoccupation with Hollywood.

== Recording and composition ==
With the release of Spooky Lady’s Sideshow, Kristofferson would begin a commercial slide and never again attain the sales he had up to that point. Rather than record with longtime producer Fred Foster in Nashville, the singer opted to record with Coolidge’s producer David Anderle at Sunset Sound in Los Angeles, and the resultant LP, sandwiched between two duet albums with wife Coolidge in 1973 and 1974, deals almost exclusively with dissipation and decline, to the point where it could be viewed as a concept album. As William Ruhlmann observed in his AllMusic review of the LP, "Over and over, Kristofferson sang of characters and of himself (or, at any rate in the persona of a first-person narrator) going downhill while consuming liquor and drugs. From the back of the album cover, which was festooned with fictional negative reviews, to song titles like "Star-Spangled Bummer (Whores Die Hard)" and "Stairway to the Bottom", the album was a portrait of excess and deterioration." The utterly uncommercial nature of the subject matter left Monument groping for a potential hit, so the rowdy horn-driven "I May Smoke Too Much" was released as a single, but it bombed, and Spooky Lady’s Sideshow became the singer's briefest charting LP of his career on the pop charts, although it did make the country Top 10.

The album utilized top session players, who enabled Kristofferson and Anderle to try out an assortment of styles and inject the kind of variety that Kristofferson's vocal delivery fought against, while Mike Utley's organ playing contributed a loose Dylanesque sound and, on occasion, an infectious jazzy-bluesy groove, as on "Late Again". The themes covered – freedom, the Devil, Jesus Christ – were not new in Kristofferson's songs, but the landscapes in these songs were unremittingly grim, as biographer Stephen Miller points out:

Generally, the subject matter was downbeat – in "Stairway to the Bottom", Kristofferson revisited the character of a philandering soak, while in "Same Old Song", he played the part of a jaded success story who finds out being on top of the heap brings a new set of problems, something also similarly addressed in "Shandy (The Perfect Disguise)". Even though the lyrics are imbued with an enigmatic wisdom, there is a sense that Kristofferson is trying too hard, failing to recreate the kind of seemingly effortless results he achieved on songs like "Me and Bobby McGee".

Kristofferson covered "Lights of Magdala", a poetic Larry Murray composition which contained religious overtones, and co-wrote two of the album's tracks with Roger McGuinn and Bob Neuwirth, lending further credence to the album's penchant for celebrating the rock and roll lifestyle. Beginning with Spooky Lady Sideshow, Kristofferson would blame his commercial downturn on Monument's lack of promotional support rather than his acting career, and he dismissed the notion that he ought to quit Hollywood, later quipping "I was doing movies, in a bathtub with Barbra Streisand! I said, ‘What! Quit this?’"

== Reception ==
In the AllMusic review of the album, which compares Spooky Lady Sideshow to Neil Young's Tonight’s the Night, it states the songs "were so saturated in controlled substances and so determinedly focused on self-destruction that they became a self-fulfilling prophecy…and instead of reinvigorating his career, the album was a misstep from which he never recovered as a recording artist".

== Track listing ==
All songs by Kris Kristofferson except where noted.

1. "Same Old Song" – 3:15
2. "Broken Freedom Song" – 5:22
3. "Shandy (The Perfect Disguise)" – 3:38
4. "Star-Spangled Bummer (Whores Die Hard)" – 3:35
5. "Lights of Magdala" (Larry Murray) – 3:40
6. "I May Smoke Too Much" – 3:07
7. "One for the Money" – 3:03
8. "Late Again (Gettin' over You)" – 3:33
9. "Stairway to the Bottom" – 3:26
10. "Rescue Mission" (Kristofferson, Roger McGuinn, Bob Neuwirth, Seymour Cassell) – 5:21
11. "Smile at Me Again" (Kristofferson, Stephen Bruton) – 3:32
12. "Rock and Roll Time" (Kristofferson, McGuinn, Neuwirth) – 4:53

== Personnel ==
- Kris Kristofferson – guitar, vocals
- Jerry McGee – guitar, sitar, harmonica
- Leland Sklar – bass
- Michael Utley – keyboards
- Sammy Creason – drums
- Bobbye Hall – percussion
- Jackie Kelso, Jim Horn – saxophone
- Chuck Findley, Dick Hyde – trombone
- Herb Pederson, Jerry McGee, John Beland, Larry Murray, Michael Utley, Rita Coolidge, Terry Paul – background vocals
- Jimmy Wachtel – album cover design

== Charts ==
Chart performance for Spooky Lady's Sideshow
Chart (1974)	Peak position
Australian Albums (Kent Music Report)	42
Canada Top Albums/CDs (RPM)	53
US Billboard 200	78
US Top Country Albums (Billboard)	11
