= Easter Island (album) =

Studio album by Kris Kristofferson
- Released: February 1978
- Studio: Sunset Sound, Los Angeles, California
- Genre: Country
- Length: 36:45
- Label: Monument
- Producer: David Anderle

Kris Kristofferson chronology
| Songs of Kristofferson (1977) | Easter Island (1978) | Natural Act (1978) |

Easter Island is the eighth solo album by Kris Kristofferson, released in 1978 on Monument.

== Background ==
Kristofferson received the Golden Globe award for Best Actor for his performance in the 1976 remake of A Star Is Born, making him one of Hollywood’s leading character actors. Conversely, his career as a recording artist seemed to be running out of steam as the decade wore on; he had not had a significant solo hit of his own since 1973’s "Why Me", and his most recent album, Surreal Thing, didn’t crack the Billboard 100. One significant event that did occur during this period is Kristofferson stopped drinking. In the A&E episode of Biography about his life, he admitted to being shaken after seeing himself unravel in A Star Is Born, recalling: "When I saw the screen, and saw the dead body, it struck me that that would be Rita (Coolidge, his then wife) and (daughter) Casey, and the people I love looking at what I left behind. I quit drinkin’ after that movie".

== Recording ==
Produced by David Anderle, Easter Island featured the same coterie of session aces that played on Kristofferson’s recent solo records, providing a loose sound, and several of the songs were co-written with band members Mike Utley and Stephen Bruton. As William Ruhlmann of AllMusic asserts, the songs Kristofferson and his cohorts came up with had commercial potential: "Any one of the four conventional love songs - "How Do You Feel (About Foolin' Around)", "Forever in Your Love", "The Bigger the Fool (The Harder the Fall)", and "Lay Me Down (And Love the World Away)" - all of them co-written with Mike Utley and Stephen Bruton, sounded like it might be a country hit. Monument chose "Forever in Your Love", but it didn't catch on". With hindsight, "How Do You Feel (About Foolin’ Around)" might have been the smart choice, since it hit the country charts for Kristofferson and Willie Nelson in 1983, although the single might have been carried along more by Nelson’s phenomenal success at that time than anything else. The title track considered those mysterious stone heads on Easter Island, with Stephen Miller asserting in his 2008 memoir Kristofferson: The Wild American, “The eerie title track, inspired by the famous stone figures on Easter Island, certainly contained some powerfully evocative Kristofferson lyrics but the underlying meaning of the song was frustratingly obscure, reminiscent of "Silver (The Hunger)" from Who’s to Bless and Who’s to Blame.”

== Reception ==
Professional ratings
Review scores
| Source | Rating |
|---|---|
| AllMusic | 3.5/5 stars |
| Rolling Stone | (unfavorable) |

With the success of A Star Is Born behind him, as well as respectable sales of the greatest hits compilation Songs of Kristofferson, momentum appeared to be on Kristofferson’s side, but Easter Island was still a commercial disappointment. AllMusic called the LP "an effort that combined ponderous, highly poetic compositions with several commercial-sounding love songs…"

== Track listing ==
All tracks by Kris Kristofferson except where noted.

1. "Risky Bizness" (Stephen Bruton, Kristofferson, Michael Utley) – 2:35
2. "How Do You Feel About Foolin' Around" (Bruton, Kristofferson, Utley) – 3:20
3. "Forever in Your Love" (Bruton, Kristofferson, Utley) – 3:16
4. "Sabre and the Rose" – 5:16
5. "Spooky Lady's Revenge" – 3:50
6. "Easter Island" (Kristofferson, Utley) – 3:43
7. "The Bigger the Fool, the Harder the Fall" (Bruton, Kristofferson, Utley) – 3:34
8. "Lay Me Down (And Love the World Away)" (Bruton, Kristofferson, Utley) – 2:53
9. "Fighter" – 3:42
10. "Living Legend" – 4:36

== Personnel ==
=== Musicians ===
- Kris Kristofferson – guitar, vocals
- Michael Utley – keyboards, synthesizer, backing vocals
- Stephen Bruton – guitars, mandolin, backing vocals
- Jerry McGee – guitars, mandolin
- Sammy Creason – drums
- Donnie Fritts – keyboards, backing vocals
- Dennis Belfield – bass
- Billy Swan, Terry Paul, Rita Coolidge – backing vocals

=== Production ===
- Produced by David Anderle for Monument Records
- Recorded at Sunset Sound Recorders, Los Angeles, California
- Recorded and mixed by Kent Nebergall, assisted by Peggy McCreary
- Mastered by Mike Reese at The Mastering Lab
- Production assistant: Ellen Vogt
- Cover design: John Berg
- Cover photo: Francesco Scavullo
- Back cover photo: Luis Villota
- Cloud photo: John Berg

== Charts ==
Chart performance for Easter Island
| Chart (1978) | Peak position |
|---|---|
| US Billboard 200 | 86 |
| US Top Country Albums (Billboard) | 21 |
