= Leon Russell (album) =

Studio album by Leon Russell
- Released: March 23, 1970
- Recorded: September 1969 – January 1970
- Studios: Olympic (London); Sunset Sound (Los Angeles); Gold Star (Hollywood); Wally Heider (Los Angeles); Ardent (Memphis)
- Genres: Americana; country; blues; rock
- Length: 38:06
- Labels: Shelter (US); A&M (UK)
- Producers: Denny Cordell, Leon Russell

Leon Russell chronology
Look Inside the Asylum Choir (1968)	Leon Russell (1970)	Leon Russell and the Shelter People (1971)

Professional ratings
Review scores
Source	Rating
AllMusic	4.5/5 stars
Christgau's Record Guide	B+

Leon Russell is the debut solo album by the American singer, songwriter, and multi-instrumentalist Leon Russell. It followed his debut with the Midnight String Quartet and a production by Russell and Marc Benno billed as the Asylum Choir.

"A Song for You", written by Russell for this album, is a slow, pained plea for forgiveness and understanding from an estranged lover. The tune is one of Russell's best-known compositions. It has been performed and recorded by over 200 artists, spanning many musical genres. Elton John has called the song an American classic.

On January 17, 2018, "A Song for You" was added to the Grammy Hall of Fame.

== Track listing ==
All tracks composed by Leon Russell except where indicated

Side one

1. "A Song for You" – 4:08
2. "Dixie Lullaby" (Russell, Chris Stainton) – 2:30
3. "I Put a Spell on You" – 4:10
4. "Shoot Out on the Plantation" – 3:10
5. "Hummingbird" – 3:57

Side two

1. "Delta Lady" – 4:00
2. "Prince of Peace" (Russell, Greg Dempsey) – 3:05
3. "Masters of War (Bob Dylan) – 1:20
4. "Give Peace a Chance" (Russell, Bonnie Bramlett) – 2:15
5. "Hurtsome Body" – 3:35
6. "Pisces Apple Lady" – 2:50
7. "Roll Away the Stone" (Russell, Greg Dempsey) – 3:06

The 1993 "Gold Disc" CD reissue contains 5 bonus tracks:

1. "The New Sweet Home Chicago" (Russell, Marc Benno) – 3:11
2. "Jammin' with Eric" (Russell, Eric Clapton) – 4:14
3. "Indian Girl" – 4:08
4. "Shoot Out on the Plantation" (solo piano version) – 3:31
5. "(Can't Seem To) Get a Line on You" (Mick Jagger, Keith Richards) – 4:16
- "Roll Away the Stone", "Pisces Apple Lady", "Hurtsome Body", "Prince of Peace", "Delta Lady", "Shoot Out On the Plantation", "I Put a Spell On You" - Recorded at Olympic Sound, London, September 1969
- "Give Peace a Chance" – Recorded at Ardent Recording, Memphis, November 1969
- "Dixie Lullaby" – recorded at Gold Star Studios, Los Angeles, December 22, 1969
- "Hummingbird" – recorded at Wally Heider Recording, Los Angeles, December 29, 1969
- "A Song for You", "Masters of War" – recorded at A&M Studios, Los Angeles, January 1970
- Final mixes by Glyn Johns made at Sunset Sound, Los Angeles, January 17–19, 1970

== Personnel ==
- Leon Russell – piano, guitar, bass guitar, vocals
- George Harrison – guitar ("Shoot Out on the Plantation" and "Hurtsome Body")
- Eric Clapton – guitar ("Delta Lady", "Prince of Peace", "Hurtsome Body", "Roll Away the Stone", "The New Sweet Home Chicago" and "Jammin' With Eric")
- Delaney Bramlett – guitar
- Alan Spenner – bass guitar
- Klaus Voormann – bass guitar ("The New Sweet Home Chicago")
- Bill Wyman – bass guitar ("Roll Away the Stone" and "Get a Line On You")
- Steve Winwood – keyboards ("Roll Away the Stone")
- Chris Stainton – keyboards (“Hurtsome Body")
- Ringo Starr – drums (Shoot Out on the Plantation", "Hurtsome Body" and "Get a Line On You")
- Charlie Watts – drums ("Roll Away the Stone")
- Buddy Harman – drums
- Jim Gordon – drums
- B.J. Wilson – drums ("Hurtsome Body")
- Jon Hiseman – drums ("The New Sweet Home Chicago")
- Mick Jagger – vocals ("Get a Line On You")
- Bonnie Bramlett – vocals
- Joe Cocker – vocals
- Merry Clayton – vocals
- Jim Horn – saxophone

Technical

- Leon Russell – producer
- Denny Cordell – producer
- Glyn Johns – engineer, mixing
- Tom Wilkes – design
- Jim McCrary – photography

"This album is dedicated to: Chris Stainton / George Harrison / Ringo Starr / Charlie Watts / Bill Wyman / Eric Clapton / Klaus Voorman / BJ Wilson / Alan Spenner / Jim Gordon / Greg Dempsey / Stevie Winwood / Jim Horn / Mr. & Mrs. Bramlett / Bobby Whiplash / Clydie King / Merry Clayton & Joe Cocker, for their inspirational music."

== Charts ==
Chart performance for Leon Russell
Chart (1970–1972)	Peak position
Australian Albums (Kent Music Report)	9
US Billboard 200	60
