= To the Bone (Kris Kristofferson album) =

Studio album by Kris Kristofferson
- Released: January 1981
- Studio: Caribou Ranch, Nederland, Colorado
- Genre: Country
- Label: Monument
- Producer: Norbert Putnam

Kris Kristofferson chronology
Shake Hands with the Devil (1979)	To the Bone (1981)	The Winning Hand (1982)

Professional ratings
Review scores
Source	Rating
AllMusic	4/5 stars

To the Bone is an album by Kris Kristofferson, released in 1981, his last for Monument Records. It is his first album after his divorce from Rita Coolidge, and many of its songs deal with relationship decline. "Nobody Loves Anybody Anymore" became a minor hit.

== Background ==
In many respects, the release of To the Bone symbolized the end of an era for Kristofferson. It would be the final album in his contract with Monument Records, which was nearly bankrupt, and in December he would divorce Rita Coolidge, with whom he recorded three duet albums. Kristofferson also spent much of the period working on Heaven's Gate, an epic film that opened to disastrous reviews in November 1980, devastating his movie career. He toured with friend Willie Nelson in the winter of 1979-1980 in support of Nelson’s tribute LP Sings Kristofferson, which made the Top 5 and spawned the hit single "Loving Her Was Easier (Than Anything I’ll Ever Do Again)". The song would also just miss the top spot on the country charts in 1981 for Tompall Glaser and the Glaser Brothers, two more examples of artists having far more success with Kristofferson’s music than he himself was having.

== Recording and composition ==
For his final Monument album, Norbert Putman replaced David Anderle in the production chair, only the third producer to work on Kristofferson’s solo albums since 1970, the other being Fred Foster. Like Bob Dylan’s 1975 album Blood on the Tracks, To the Bone was a deeply personal album that explored the disillusion and heartache in the wake of a disintegrated relationship – specifically Kristofferson’s failed marriage with ex-wife Coolidge. By all accounts, the ending had been a bitter one; Heaven’s Gate co-star Ronnie Hawkins remembers that while on the set "Rita had lawyers up there suing him – so he had to have meetings regarding all that stuff as well as all the other stuff that was going wrong in his life". In his assessment of the album, biographer Stephen Miller writes:

"Blessing in Disguise" began and ended with verses from "The Wild Side of Life", a number one hit for Hank Thompson in 1952 about a wife who abandons her husband in favour of the night life. Since much of the album was inspired by Kris and Rita’s life together, this intriguingly suggested that he might not have been the only one to wander, or was he simply viewing himself through Rita’s eyes?

Having been disowned by his family when he turned his back on an army career to pursue songwriting in Nashville, Kristofferson was all too aware of the emotional pain that familial turmoil could bring, and he expressed these concerns in "Daddy’s Song", which was about the pain his separation with Rita was causing their daughter Casey. The Billy Swan co-written "Nobody Loves Anybody Anymore", another song expressing bitterness and grief over lost love, would be a modestly successful single.

== Reception ==
Despite its downbeat subject matter, To the Bone charted for several weeks, a better showing than his previous LP Shake Hands with the Devil, but it was not a commercial success. Kristofferson would not release another studio album for six years.

== Track listing ==
All songs composed by Kris Kristofferson; except as noted

1. "Magdalene" – 3:42
2. "Star-Crossed" – 3:29
3. "Blessing in Disguise" – 3:26
4. "Devil to Pay" (Merle Travis, Leon Rusk) – 3:23
5. "Daddy's Song" – 5:03
6. "Snakebit" – 3:32
7. "Nobody Loves Anybody Anymore" (Kristofferson, Billy Swan) – 3:08
8. "Maybe You Heard" – 2:59
9. "The Last Time" – 4:13
10. "I'll Take Any Chance I Can With You" (Kristofferson, Glen Clark) – 3:29

== Personnel ==
- Kris Kristofferson - vocals, guitar
- Donnie Fritts - keyboards
- Glen Clark - keyboards, backing vocals
- Billy Swan - guitar, backing vocals
- Stephen Bruton - guitar, backing vocals
- Tommy McClure - bass
- David Briggs - keyboards
- Steve Gibson - guitar
- Sammy Creason - drums

== Production ==
- Produced by Norbert Putnam
- Engineered by Gene Eichelberger
- Recorded at Caribou Ranch, Nederland, Colorado
- Additional recording at the Bennett House, Franklin, TN and Quadrafonic Studio, Nashville, TN
- Photography by Henry Diltz
- Design by Bill Johnson
- Special thanks to Fred Foster

== Liner Notes ==
Everything becomes as crystal clear as the air in the mountains; the old man with the bronze face burning in the last sunlight against a deep blue empty sky. He says to me "If someone tells you that they ain't good enough for you, believe 'em. Like as not they know what they're talking about." He smiled, and the sunlight caught the diamond in his eye. "It ain't a tragedy" he says. "But it's a shame."
