= List of Billboard 200 number-one albums of 1977 =

These are the Billboard magazine number-one albums of 1977, per the Billboard 200.

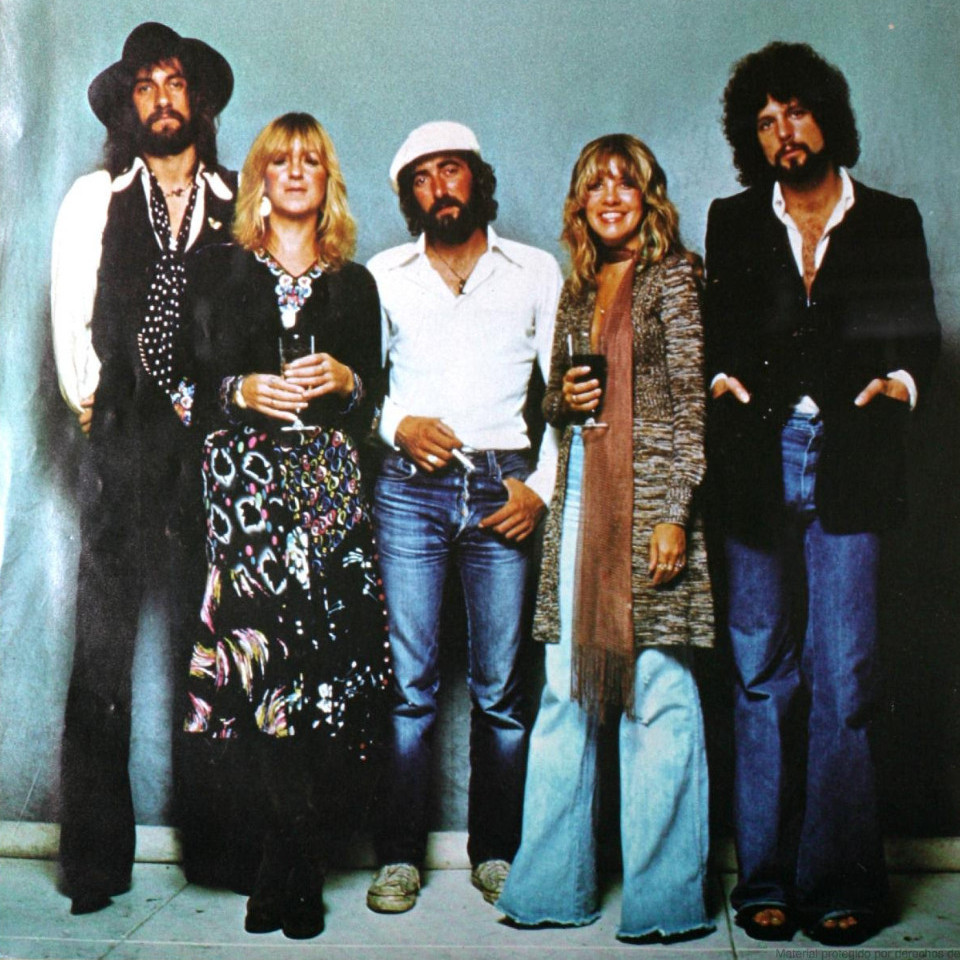
Rumours by Fleetwood Mac was the best-selling album of 1977. It was number one for 29 non-consecutive weeks, or more than half of the year.

== Chart history ==
Key
†	Indicates best performing album of 1977

Issue date	Album	Artist(s)	Label	Ref.
January 1	Songs in the Key of Life	Stevie Wonder	Tamla	
January 8	Songs in the Key of Life	Stevie Wonder	Tamla	
January 15	Hotel California	Eagles	Asylum	
January 22	Wings over America	Wings	Capitol	
January 29	Songs in the Key of Life	Stevie Wonder	Tamla	
February 5	Hotel California	Eagles	Asylum	
February 12	A Star Is Born	Streisand & Kristofferson / Soundtrack	Columbia	
February 19	A Star Is Born	Streisand & Kristofferson / Soundtrack	Columbia	
February 26	A Star Is Born	Streisand & Kristofferson / Soundtrack	Columbia	
March 5	A Star Is Born	Streisand & Kristofferson / Soundtrack	Columbia	
March 12	A Star Is Born	Streisand & Kristofferson / Soundtrack	Columbia	
March 19	A Star Is Born	Streisand & Kristofferson / Soundtrack	Columbia	
March 26	Hotel California	Eagles	Asylum	
April 2	Rumours †	Fleetwood Mac	Warner Bros.	
April 9	Rumours †	Fleetwood Mac	Warner Bros.	
April 16	Hotel California	Eagles	Asylum	
April 23	Hotel California	Eagles	Asylum	
April 30	Hotel California	Eagles	Asylum	
May 7	Hotel California	Eagles	Asylum	
May 14	Hotel California	Eagles	Asylum	
May 21	Rumours †	Fleetwood Mac	Warner Bros.	
May 28	Rumours †	Fleetwood Mac	Warner Bros.	
June 4	Rumours †	Fleetwood Mac	Warner Bros.	
June 11	Rumours †	Fleetwood Mac	Warner Bros.	
June 18	Rumours †	Fleetwood Mac	Warner Bros.	
June 25	Rumours †	Fleetwood Mac	Warner Bros.	
July 2	Rumours †	Fleetwood Mac	Warner Bros.	
July 9	Rumours †	Fleetwood Mac	Warner Bros.	
July 16	Barry Manilow Live	Barry Manilow	Arista	
July 23	Rumours †	Fleetwood Mac	Warner Bros.	
July 30	Rumours †	Fleetwood Mac	Warner Bros.	
August 6	Rumours †	Fleetwood Mac	Warner Bros.	
August 13	Rumours †	Fleetwood Mac	Warner Bros.	
August 20	Rumours †	Fleetwood Mac	Warner Bros.	
August 27	Rumours †	Fleetwood Mac	Warner Bros.	
September 3	Rumours †	Fleetwood Mac	Warner Bros.	
September 10	Rumours †	Fleetwood Mac	Warner Bros.	
September 17	Rumours †	Fleetwood Mac	Warner Bros.	
September 24	Rumours †	Fleetwood Mac	Warner Bros.	
October 1	Rumours †	Fleetwood Mac	Warner Bros.	
October 8	Rumours †	Fleetwood Mac	Warner Bros.	
October 15	Rumours †	Fleetwood Mac	Warner Bros.	
October 22	Rumours †	Fleetwood Mac	Warner Bros.	
October 29	Rumours †	Fleetwood Mac	Warner Bros.	
November 5	Rumours †	Fleetwood Mac	Warner Bros.	
November 12	Rumours †	Fleetwood Mac	Warner Bros.	
November 19	Rumours †	Fleetwood Mac	Warner Bros.	
November 26	Rumours †	Fleetwood Mac	Warner Bros.	
December 3	Simple Dreams	Linda Ronstadt	Asylum	
December 10	Simple Dreams	Linda Ronstadt	Asylum	
December 17	Simple Dreams	Linda Ronstadt	Asylum	
December 24	Simple Dreams	Linda Ronstadt	Asylum	
December 31	Simple Dreams	Linda Ronstadt	Asylum	

== See also ==
- 1977 in music
- List of number-one albums (United States)
