= The Asylum Choir =

American rock music duo

The Asylum Choir was an American rock duo active in the late 1960s. It was composed of keyboardist Leon Russell and guitarist Marc Benno.

== History ==
Essentially a studio musician gathering, the Asylum Choir was formed around 1967 and the group's debut album was issued in 1968. A second album was recorded in 1969, but the album did not see release until late 1971 because of contract disputes. The duo had long since disbanded, but the second record sold well due to Russell's successful solo career, peaking at No. 70 on the Billboard 200 in 1972. Benno also became a successful solo artist later in the decade. He also played guitar on The Doors album, L.A. Woman.

Russell used his creativity by writing and arranging each song. Russell recorded and played back a sped-up trumpet section. He used a multitrack recording of himself playing piano, guitar and drums on each song. Benno using multi-track recording was on vocals, guitar and bass guitar.

== Discography ==
- Look Inside the Asylum Choir (Smash Records, 1968)
- Asylum Choir II (Shelter Records, 1971)
