= Sammy Creason =

American drummer (1944–1995)

Sammy Lee Creason (27 November 1944 – 21 December 1995) was an American session drummer who played with Tony Joe White, Kris Kristofferson and Bob Dylan amongst others.

== Life and career ==
Growing up in Jonesboro, Arkansas, United States, he learned to play in a blooming music scene that included Joe Lee, Larry Donn, Billy Lee Riley, Bob Tucker, Sonny Burgess and Carl Perkins. He first started playing with Ray Coble and the JazzKatz in 1958, standing in for his brother Gary, who had broken his foot. Creason played with Sonny Burgess and Larry Donn in early 1961, but being in the high school band, he was required to play at all school functions, which occasionally interfered with Burgess' schedule. After finishing high school, Creason moved to Memphis and worked for Ray Brown's booking agency, where he began working with The Spyders, who became The Tarantulas and had a chart record with an instrumental hit "Tarantula".

After illness kept Bill Black from appearing with The Bill Black Combo (a brain tumor eventually killed him in October 1965), The Tarantulas became The Bill Black Combo with the addition of Reggie Young on guitar.

In 1963, Bob Tucker joined the Bill Black Combo as a road manager and guitar/bass player. Bill Black was already ill and unable to travel as a result of a brain tumor that would cause his death in 1965. The Bill Black Combo created musical history in 1964 when they became the opening act for The Beatles on their historical 13-city tour of America after their appearance on The Ed Sullivan Show. Bill Black himself was not well enough to make the tour.

In 1968 and 1969, Creason recorded two albums with Tony Joe White; Tony Joe and ...Continued which included White's hit "Rainy Night in Georgia". He also appeared on The Tonight Show Starring Johnny Carson, American television's popular late-night talk show. He was nominated at least twice in the drummer category of Playboy magazine's Jazz and Pop Poll in the late 1960s and early 1970s.

In the late 1960s, pianist Jim Dickinson, drummer Sammy Creason, organist Michael Utley, guitarist Charlie Freeman and bassist Tommy McClure, formed "the Dixie Flyers" and moved to Miami to work as a studio band for Atlantic Records, where they recorded with artists such as Aretha Franklin and Wilson Pickett. Creason also worked with B. J. Thomas, Brook Benton, Jimmy Buffett, Sam the Sham, Dr. John, Sam & Dave, Bob Dylan, Ronnie Hawkins, Charlie Rich, Dottie West, Junior Parker and Ted Nugent.

Between 1971 and 1975, Creason and the Flyers formed a relationship with Rita Coolidge, appearing on her albums Nice Feelin', The Lady's Not for Sale, Full Moon (with Kris Kristofferson, Fall into Spring, Breakaway (with Kris Kristofferson) and It's Only Love.

Through Coolidge's marriage to Kris Kristofferson, Creason played on Kristofferson's Who's to Bless and Who's to Blame, Spooky Lady's Sideshow, Live at the Philharmonic, To the Bone, Shake Hands with the Devil, Easter Island, and Surreal Thing, and the soundtrack album to A Star Is Born.

In January 1973, Creason played in the first Pat Garrett & Billy The Kid session held in CBS Discos Studios, Mexico City.

Creason had been living in the Boston area for several years, working for Wells Fargo company and playing alongside Kristofferson.

Through his association with Kristofferson, Creason appeared in small parts in the movies Convoy (1978) and A Star Is Born (1976)

Creason died from a brain aneurism in Nashville, Tennessee, in December 1995, at the age of 51.

== Artists played with ==
Willie Nelson, Aretha Franklin, Tony Joe White, Kris Kristofferson, Carmen McRae, The Memphis Horns, Brook Benton, Barbra Streisand, Delbert McClinton, Rita Coolidge, Dan Penn, Esther Phillips, Delaney & Bonnie, Geoff Muldaur, Billy Swan, Tom Pacheco, Hoyt Axton, Gene Clark, Jimmy Buffett, Bob Neuwirth, Duane Allman, Donnie Fritts, Jim Dickinson, Ronnie Hawkins, Petula Clark, Jerry Jaye, Jerry Jeff Walker, Lulu.
