= Leon Rusk =

American singer-songwriter

Malcolm Leon Rusk (August 14, 1921 – May 14, 1950) was an American country singer and songwriter. He was born in Canyon, Texas, United States, and died, aged 28, in a traffic accident near Tulia, Texas.

He had been badly injured during World War II and began a musical career after the war recording for King Records.

His recording, "Air Mail Special On The Fly", has been covered by David Grisman and Jim & Jesse.

He wrote several songs with Merle Travis including "Petal From A Faded Rose", which was variously recorded by Hank Snow, Wilma Burgess, Jimmy Dickens and George Morgan. Another collaboration, "Devil to Pay" was recorded by both Johnny Cash on his 1970 album Hello, I'm Johnny Cash and by Kris Kristofferson on the 1981 album To the Bone. Rusk himself recorded the joint effort "Until Dawn" (78 rpm; b-side: "Dream Train Engineer"; King 546). In 1947, he was working at the Silver Spur in Los Angeles with Jack Rogers. They collaborated on a few tunes which Rusk intended to record on the King label
