= Heat (perfume) =

Perfume endorsed by Beyoncé

Fragrance by Beyoncé
- Released: February 3, 2010
- Label: Coty
- Tagline: Catch the fever
- Successor: Heat Ultimate Elixir

Heat is a perfume endorsed by American singer-songwriter Beyoncé. It was created by her alongside Claude Dir and Olivier Gillotin of the company Givaudan. The product, which was released on February 3, 2010, uses the tagline "catch the fever". The release was promoted with a cover version of "Fever" recorded by Beyoncé and a limited edition extended play (EP) also titled Heat. She also appeared at Macy's Herald Square to launch the perfume and on The Today Show where she discussed about Heat.

The fragrance's commercial, directed by director Jake Nava and released in December 2009, spawned controversy for its sexually explicit imagery, and was only allowed nighttime broadcast in the United Kingdom. Macy's sold US$3 million worth of Heat between early February and early March 2010. It received mixed reviews from critics, and it was nominated at several fragrance award ceremonies.

Heat was followed by five additional releases: Heat Ultimate Elixir meant to capture a more private side of the entertainer, Heat Rush intended as a daytime fragrance, Midnight Heat, a night fragrance, Heat The Mrs. Carter Show World Tour, a limited product dedicated to the tour of that name, Heat Wild Orchid, a floral update of the original, Heat Kissed, a romantic update of the original and Heat Seduction. Each scent was followed with its own Eau De Parfum release and multiple gift sets. In 2013, in addition to becoming the best-selling celebrity-branded fragrance line, the perfumes went on to become the third best-selling fragrance worldwide with $400 million earned at retail globally.

== Conception ==
=== Development ===
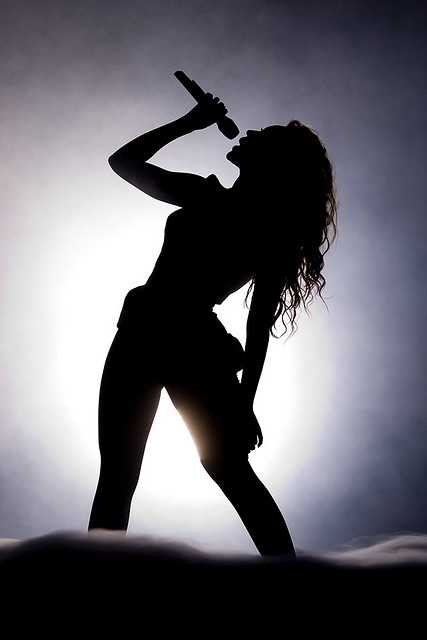
Knowles performing during the I Am... World Tour, 2009. She said that the main inspiration for the title of Heat came from the live performances of her tours which utilized pyrotechnics.

In December 2009, Beyoncé announced that she would release her first fragrance, titled Heat, the following year. Prior to releasing the fragrance, she had collaborated with Tommy Hilfiger on his perfume True Star in 2004 and Giorgio Armani's Diamonds for which she also appeared in several promotional campaigns. Beyoncé created the fragrance in 2009 with the testing of its smell done by Coty, Inc. Beyoncé presented Heat to her fans during backstage meetings on her I Am... World Tour (2009–10). It was released in the United States on February 3, 2010. According to Beyoncé's official parfum website, Heat is a "captivating fragrance that unleashes a spirited fire within." It was also described as "a unique expression of a woman's powerful sensuality: sexy, elegant yet feminine with an air of mystery", summing up that the fragrance reflects "a self-assured woman, who is not afraid to desire and to be desired." Beyoncés' official perfume website also described Heat as an "alluring [and] modern fragrance... [which] embodies a compelling spirit".

In a behind the scenes video, Beyoncé revealed the reason behind naming the fragrance Heat. According to her, it was because the scent comes off as "infectious", further elaborating: "It's like something you can't get enough of. It's hot, it's sexy, it definitely makes you feel like you caught the fever." She additionally stated that her favorite fragrance notes are red vanilla orchid, due to its "sexy" and "spicy" smell, and honeysuckle, due to its "sensual" and "sweet" smell. She concluded: "It was a lot of work but I was really really happy and I think it's something I'll be proud of 20 years from now." During an interview with Teen Vogue, Beyoncé stated that she loved the perfume because it featured notes of orchid, her favorite flower. She further said that it was suitable for her alter ego Sasha Fierce as it was "fiery".

=== Packaging and scent ===
Heat is packaged in a red triangular bottle. The top of the bottle is edged with a gold band and the words "Beyoncé" and "Heat" and the cap is etched with the letter B. The scent has been described as floral, fruity and woody, and it was marketed as both "feminine and irresistible" by the entertainer's official perfume website. The fragrance is described as having top notes of vanilla, magnolia, neroli and peach; middle notes of almond macaroon, honeysuckle and musk; and base notes with "a warm and sexy dry-down" of giant sequoia milkwood, tonka bean and amber. Reviewers particularly identified tonka bean, neroli and almond, along with woody and floral notes. Following the release of Heat, Beyoncé described its bottle design, scent and inspiration in depth, as follows:

A lot of my performances have had fire involved, so we thought 'Heat.' Also, red is one of my favorite colors, as is gold. So then we thought of making the bottle look like it's on fire. I love antique bottles — my mother had a collection of them when I was growing up. I wanted something with an antique yet modern feeling. Even with my wardrobe, I always try to find things that have a little bit of something vintage, yet still timeless and classic. The bottle, I felt, was a great mixture of the two... Everything, from the bottle design to the name and the ideas for the commercials–that's me. When I commit to something, I do it 100 percent, and I've never had [creative control over a fragrance] until this project. I learned a lot of great things from the past — but I always asked myself, 'If I could have my own scent, what would it be?' I wasn't worried about deadlines. It could have taken me three, four, however many years — this was my first fragrance, and I wanted to make sure that it was something I would love forever.

Products

- 100 ml/ 3.4 oz
- 50 ml/ 1.7 oz
- 30 ml/ 1.0 oz
- 15 ml/ 0.5 oz
- Body Lotion 200 ml/ 6.7 oz
- Shower Gel 200 ml/ 6.7 oz
- Sparkling Body Mist 125 ml/ 4.2 oz

== Promotion ==
In November 2009, the print advertising for Heat was shot by Michael Thompson, who described Beyoncé as "sultry" on the poster. Thompson said in a behind the scenes look at the shoot for the fragrance, that he wanted to capture Beyoncé "in her true essence", where she "generates heat" and is just "sensual and fun and full of energy." A writer of Rap-Up praised her look, saying that she was "burning up" the print. The advertisement was published in fashion, beauty and lifestyle magazines in February 2010. On February 3, 2010, Beyoncé launched the scent at Macy's Herald Square in New York City, where she posed for photos and signed autographs for fans. Heat was released in 2,000 department and specialty store doors in the United States. The collection was also released in Canada and Latin America in February 2010 with additional global distribution in Europe, Asia and Australia in August 2010. On February 9, 2010, Beyoncé appeared on The Today Show where she talked about Heat. From January 15, 2011, to February 15, 2011, Seventeen magazine gave away 10,000 free samples of Heat. A sample of the fragrance was given for each copy of the February 2011 issue of the magazine bought. A sample of Heat was distributed alongside each copy of Beyoncé's live album, I Am... World Tour (2010) and her fourth studio album, 4 (2011). Industry sources estimated that Coty Beauty spent a total of $20 million on advertising and promotion of the perfume the first year after its release.

=== Commercial ===
The television commercial for Heat was directed by Jake Nava, who previously directed Beyoncé's videos for her singles "Crazy In Love", "Baby Boy", "Beautiful Liar", "If I Were a Boy", and "Single Ladies (Put a Ring on It)". Trey Laird was the executive creative director, while Hans Dorsinville was the creative director of the video. Laird stated that the main theme of the commercial was that Beyoncé should appear "sexy and a little bit dangerous", but in a "sophisticated and elegant way". Released on television channels in December 2009, the commercial is set to Beyoncé's cover version of "Fever" (2010) playing in the background. It features her in the same red satin kimono that she has worn on the print advertisement. Beyoncé is seen sweating profusely in a steamy bathroom while in one of the scenes, she is seen seemingly enjoying herself in a bath.

Nava praised Beyoncé's acting in the commercial, stating: "She's so scorchingly hot that even when she touches the floor with her dangerous high-heels, she kind of sets her world on fire." In an interview with Women's Wear Daily, Beyoncé described the sexual tone of the video stating: "'It's called Heat, so we wanted the ads to be really steamy and dewy. My sexiest moments are when I'm just getting out of the tub or the shower and I'm clean, so I wanted to incorporate that in the ads. The dress was this liquid-y satin. The song Fever I did years ago and always loved it. [For the commercial] I got to sing it a bit more whispery, more natural." "Fever" was re-recorded by Beyoncé on two different occasions. Knowles first recorded her version of "Fever" on September 9, 2003 for her film The Fighting Temptations. Before the release of Heat, she recorded "Fever" again for the fragrance's television commercial. After the launch of Heat, the latter version of the song was officially released as a promotional single to the US iTunes Store through Columbia Records on February 8, 2010, to promote the fragrance. It was made available digitally in the United Kingdom the following day.

The commercial for the fragrance found controversy in the United Kingdom with UK's Advertising Standards Authority. It was banned from the country's daytime TV rotation due to its "sexy imagery" and was only shown after 7:30 in the afternoon. The U.K.'s Advertising Standards Authority commented on the ban decision, stating "We considered that Beyoncé's body movements and the camera's prolonged focus on shots of her dress slipping away to partially expose her breasts created a sexually provocative ad that was unsuitable to be seen by young children." Coty, Inc., the world's largest fragrance company, replied to the ban, stating that they do not think there is anything too explicit about the TV spot. Coty continued that the commercial was "intended to reflect the singer Beyoncé's personal 'sexy chic' style," and while Beyoncé's cleavage is exposed at certain parts of the commercial, Coty stated that it is not "overtly graphic or explicitly sexual and at no point was Beyoncé naked." Brad Wete of Entertainment Weekly defended Beyoncé, saying that "[the advertisement] is sexy. It's suggestive and sultry. But it's certainly not X-rated." Beyoncé's mother and collaborator Tina Knowles called the commercial's ban "very good", as people purposely went to watch the video which further increased sales.

== Reception ==
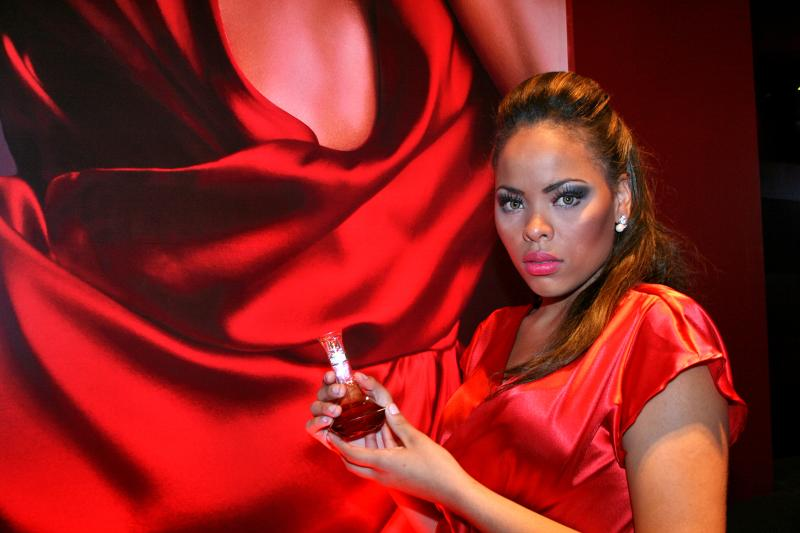
A model holding a bottle of Heat during its release in Brazil

Amy Odell of New York magazine gave Heat's scent a negative review. She criticized the fragrance's packaging as being very similar to that of K-Y Jelly. She stated: "Once on the skin, the scent transformed in a matter of just a few minutes from something floral-y and vaguely acceptable to an offensive mix of car fumes and that vanilla body spray Victoria's Secret used to sell to 12-year-olds", then adding that the perfume's logo and gold swirls "sway too similar to that of KY Jelly's", before concluding that "calling to mind sex is kind of Beyoncé's thing, which is why this fragrance could just be a smashing success." Holly Siegel of The New York Times complimented the fragrance's scent of "floral-fruity-woody blend and notes of neroli, almond and tonka bean." On October 25, 2010, the perfume won a gold status at the Design of the Times Awards by The Strive Group. At the 2011 CEW Beauty Awards, Heat won in the category for Best Fragrance of the Year: Mass. The same year, it also won in the category for Best Fragrance at the Dutch Drugstore Awards, and Best Fragrance in the Lifestyle at the Norwegian Cosmetic Awards. It also received a nomination in the category for Media Campaign of the Year at the 2011 FiFi Awards.

It was revealed by Macy's Chief executive officer, Terry Lundgren, that his chain had sold US$3 million worth of Heat between early February 2010 and early March 2010. Lundgren revealed that, during a one-hour period at the launch of the scent when Beyoncé was at the store signing autographs, 72,000 bottles were sold. Within days of the fragrance's release, it was named as one of the best-selling scents in America. According to The Fragrance Shop in the UK, Heat also topped a poll of best-selling celebrity scents.

== Related products ==
During an interview with Women's Wear Daily in December 2009, Stephen Mormoris announced that Beyoncé planned to release several other fragrances after Heat meant to explore the different sides of her personality. However, he added that Heat was meant to be "the enduring classic... this scent will re-energize the celebrity category". Consequently, five additional fragrances were released from the Heat line: Heat Ultimate Elixir, Heat Rush, Midnight Heat, Heat: The Mrs. Carter Show World Tour and Heat Wild Orchid. In 2013, it was revealed that with $400 million earned at retail globally, the line of perfumes was placed at number three on the list of best-selling fragrances. The Heat releases further became the best-selling line of celebrity endorsed fragrances. Mormois discussed his collaboration with Beyoncé on the Heat line, saying: "Beyoncé has always chosen simple and strong concepts for her fragrances. She's very collaborative in that she know[s] what she wants and she has a very clear view of her fan base. There are just a few of that qualities that make her an excellent partner. She is excellent at making decisions and making them happen." In September 2011, Beyoncé followed Heat with a new line of fragrances titled Beyoncé Pulse.

=== Heat Ultimate Elixir ===
Heat Ultimate Elixir

Fragrance by Beyoncé
- Released: September 2010
- Label: Coty
- Tagline: Catch the Fever
- Predecessor: Heat
- Successor: Heat Rush

In August 2010, it was revealed that Beyoncé would be re-releasing her first fragrance as an "ultimate elixir", emphasizing elements intended to embody her private side. The scent was released in September 2010. As its theme, the perfume offers a more intense and sensual version of the original Heat scent. Upon revealing the inspiration of Heat Ultimate Elixir, Beyoncé stated that the reason which motivated her to update the original scent was the idea of her mother's scent when she was a child:

My first memory of fragrance is my mother, and as a very young girl, hearing her footsteps... Her stilettos click, click, clicking on the hardwood floor and she wore a beautiful fragrance and she would walk past me and it would just stay in the room. It left a warm feeling every time I thought about her scent. I think about the icons that I respect and they all have their own fragrance so I thought it was time for me to have my own.

Ultimate Elixir mixes notes of vanilla orchid and osmanthus top notes with cedarwood and amber middle notes, then adds in vanilla and tonka bean base notes. Kelly Bryant of StyleList wrote that the base notes of Heat Ultimate Elixir "drive the point home that this is a bouquet meant for one sexy siren". Selling the scent's elixir, Macy's described the fragrance as an "opulent and intoxicating twist on the original scent." Keeping with the scent's "sexy theme", the new scarlet jus is contained in the original bottle, updated with a black atomizer, which has been described as "boudoir-ready" by Katherine Kluznik Rentmeester of People magazine.

Nathalie Atkinson of The National Post held a sniff test for the Heat Ultimate Elixir perfume to assess the different scents picked up by people of the opposite sex. Cosmetics editor Dave Lackie, who was asked to be the male participant of the scent, described the elixir as "stronger than the original", noting strong hints in scents such as "peach-flavoured candy paired with nondescript flowers" which offered "a nice drydown". Atkinson, the female participant, noted Beyoncé's intense use of creamsicle, adding that the scent holds strong enough "to get noticed above the hairspray fumes and thumping bass". In a list of "Noseworthy Perfumes", Oprah Winfrey listed Heat Ultimate Elixir at number two, favoring the fragrance's "honeysuckle nectar, musk, and warm, sensual" sequoia scent. The Independent described the scent as a "spicier flanker" in comparison to the original release. New York magazine found the fragrance's packaging "just as 'lubelike' as the original."

=== Heat Rush ===
New fragrance project working sessions for Heat Rush took place backstage in Newcastle upon Tyne, England in November 2009 and the fragrance was released in February 2011. During the new fragrance project working sessions, Beyoncé deciphered through different scents, later choosing a "Sunset Cocktail Mod 5" scent because it made her feel "as though a breeze were coming through the room" and seemed "like more of a risk". Beyoncé's official perfume website described Heat Rush as a fruity, floral fragrance "that is luminous and vibrant with a dewy delicacy at the same time... It captures Beyoncé's bright sensuality; it's young, fresh, and joyful." The same source listed the scent's top notes as passion fruit, orange and cherry; the middle notes meant to embody "Beyoncé's ultra-feminine side" with orchid, mango and orange hibiscus; and the base notes contain teak, honey and a musk blend that was said to be inspired by sunsets in Brazil.

=== Heat: Limited edition CD ===
Heat

EP by Beyoncé
- Released: February 2011
- Recorded: 2010–2011
- Studios: Coty, Inc. (75002 Paris & New York City)
- Genre: R&B
- Length: 29:46
- Labels: Columbia; Music World; Coty, Inc.

Beyoncé chronology
I Am... World Tour (2010)	Heat (2011)	4 (2011)

A limited edition gift extended play (EP) also titled Heat was released in February 2011, almost a year after the promotional release of "Fever". Promotion in the United States for the perfume took place with a free tote bag, while the limited edition gift EP was used as promotion for all United Kingdom releases of the perfume. One compact disc copy of the EP was included with every purchase of a 50 ml bottle of Heat. The EP features a cover of "Fever", which Beyoncé originally sang in The Fighting Temptations, and later released as a download in 2010. The EP contains remixes of other songs Beyoncé previously recorded; Karmatronic remixed "At Last", which she sang in Cadillac Records, and "Satellites", a track from I Am... Sasha Fierce. Catalyst remixed "Broken-Hearted Girl", and Lost Daze remixed "Smash Into You", both of which are songs from I Am... Sasha Fierce. The Catalyst remix of "Broken-Hearted Girl" was previously made available on Beyoncé's 2009 remix album Above and Beyoncé: Video Collection & Dance Mixes.

==== Track listing ====
Heat track listing
No.	Title	Writer(s)	Producer(s)	Length
1.	"Fever"	Eddie Cooley; John Davenport	Beyoncé Knowles; Chink Santana	3:33
2.	"At Last" (Karmatronic Remix)	Mack Gordon; Harry Warren	Moe Cohen (executive); Peter Krakczar; Achillies Sparta	7:38
3.	"Broken-Hearted Girl" (Catalyst Remix)	Kenneth Edmonds; Mikkel Storleer Eriksen; Tor Erik Hermansen; Knowles	Catalyst	4:55
4.	"Satellites" (Karmatronic Remix)	Ian Dench; Amanda Ghost; Knowles; Dave McCracken	Moe Cohen (exec.); Peter Krakczar; Achillies Sparta	7:19
5.	"Smash Into You" (Lost Daze Remix)	Knowles; Terius Nash; Christopher Stewart	Peace Bisquit; Frank DeMaria; Anthony Saputo	6:21
Total length:				29:46

==== Personnel ====
Credits for Heat, adapted from the CD liner notes:

- Executive producer – Beyoncé Knowles, Moe Cohen
- Vocals – Knowles
- Mastering – Tom Coyne
- Producers – Knowles, Chink Santana, Achillies Sparta, Peter Krakczar, Catalyst, Frank DeMaria, Anthony Saputo, Peace Bisquit
- Remix Coordination – Angelo "Pepe" Skordos, Bill Coleman

=== Midnight Heat ===
Midnight Heat

Fragrance by Beyoncé
- Released: July 2012
- Label: Coty
- Tagline: Heat up the Night
- Predecessor: Heat Rush
- Successor: Pulse Summer Edition
- Website: Official website

Midnight Heat was released in July 2012 following Heat Rush. It is packaged in a purple bottle. According to Beyoncé's official website, "For [her], fragrance is an essential accessory to highlight your inner radiance, confidence and sex appeal. Midnight Heat is the ultimate evening scent, sensual and enticing with just a hint of mystery." The perfume's top notes are described as dragon fruit, apricot and starfruit; middle notes of orchid, tulip and peony; and base notes of sandalwood, patchouli and amber. A poster for the fragrance was released on July 18, 2012, and shows Beyoncé wearing a purple mini-dress. Idolator's writer X. Alexander wrote that she looked "appropriately regal in purple in her new fragrance art" while Julee Wilson of The Huffington Post wrote that the advertisement "definitely screams sensual". Gaby Wilson of MTV commented that the photo appropriately sets the mood for the midnight perfume further praising Beyoncé's look. Ambika Mutto of VH1 gave a negative review for the poster, writing that she was "really disappointed" because the image was "boring and literal". She noted, "Sexy hair flying, sexy dress in a color reminiscent of midnight, on a rooftop against the midnight sky — we get it." A writer of the website Digital Spy praised the scent, writing that it empowers "your inner diva" and added that "there will be no Single Ladies left if you wear this". At the 2013 StyleBistro Awards, Midnight Heat was nominated in the category for Best New Fragrance.

=== Heat: The Mrs. Carter Show World Tour ===
Heat: The Mrs. Carter Show World Tour

Fragrance by Beyoncé
- Released: June 10, 2013
- Label: Coty
- Tagline: Introducing a new kind of fire
- Predecessor: Midnight Heat
- Successor: Pulse NYC
- Website: Official website

In April 2013, Beyoncé embarked her fourth concert tour, The Mrs. Carter Show World Tour. In June 2013, it was announced that a limited edition of Heat, titled Heat: The Mrs. Carter Show World Tour, would be released the same month, inspired by the tour. Speaking about the fragrance, Beyoncé said: "I love my music, I love performing and most of all I love and appreciate my fans. I wanted to give them a special remembrance of this tour and I created this scent to reflect the power, passion and playfulness I put into my performances." The fragrance opens with mangosteen, black pepper and Açaí palm as its top notes and later continues with violet petals, Indian Sambac Jasmine and a Brassia Edua Loo orchid as its middle notes before finishing with bourbon vanilla, Australian sandalwood and vetiver as its base notes. Gaby Wilson of MTV noted that the ingredients introduced a lighter scent than her previous releases. According to Beyoncé's official perfume website, the fragrance is "paying tribute to Beyoncé's amazing momentous journey" and further "transport[s] you into Beyoncé's world and the intensity of her shows. [It] will make you feel the power, passion and playfulness she gives to her fans." It was also meant to celebrate Beyoncé's accomplishments and her "historic life journey". Gregory DelliCarpini Jr. of Billboard magazine described the scent of the fragrance as "strong and feminine". Holly Carter of People magazine noted that the scent was "the best-smelling alternative" for people who missed The Mrs. Carter Show World Tour.

=== Heat Wild Orchid ===
Heat Wild Orchid

Fragrance by Beyoncé
- Released: June 18, 2014
- Label: Coty
- Tagline: You caught the fever, Now unleash your wild side.
- Predecessor: Rise
- Successor: Rise Sheer
- Website: Official website

On June 18, 2014, it was announced by several publications that Beyoncé would be releasing a new fragrance in August 2014 titled Heat Wild Orchid. The promotional poster for the perfume was also revealed, showing Beyoncé wearing a black dress. Caitlin Morton writing for MTV praised her new, mature and "classy" look. Dorkys Ramos from BET echoed her statements stating that it featured a "classier Bey". The fragrance was released to stores in August 2014. It was described as an "enticing, mouth-watering fragrance that emits a fierce, feminine energy" in a press release. According to Beyoncé's website it is a "spellbound scent that expresses the bold femininity of women": "This captivating and memorable fragrance invites and intoxicates those who encounter it". It was created in collaboration with Firmenich perfumer Honorine Blanc. The fragrance opens with pomegranate, coconut water and boysenberry. In the middle notes, a floral scent consisting of honeysuckle and blooming magnolia was used. The base notes showcase blonde woods, skin musks and gilded amber. The top of the bottle is wrapped in a gold band inscribed with Beyoncé's name at the neck. The secondary packaging celebrates the "beauty and sensuality" of the fragrance intertwined with black organza and finished with a gold logo and an emblematic B standing for Beyoncé. MTV's Caitlin Morton praised Heat Orchid as a fresher and more floral update of the original scent while also deeming it more natural and "maternal". Glamour's Leanne Bayley praised the fact that Beyoncé "bottled up her sexiness in one chic bottle" with the fragrance.

== See also ==
- List of celebrity-branded fragrances
