= Who's to Bless and Who's to Blame =

Studio album by Kris Kristofferson
- Released: November 1975
- Studio: Sunset Sound, Los Angeles, California
- Genre: Country
- Label: Monument
- Producer: David Anderle

Kris Kristofferson chronology
Breakaway (1974)	Who's to Bless and Who's to Blame (1975)	Surreal Thing (1976)

Professional ratings
Review scores
Source	Rating
Allmusic	3/5 stars
Rolling Stone	(unfavorable)

Who's to Bless and Who's to Blame is the sixth solo album by Kris Kristofferson, released in 1975 on Monument Records. Its title track is quoted in the Johnny Cash song "The Man Comes Around" from the 2002 album of the same name. The song "Stranger" was covered as a duet by Johnny Duncan and Janie Fricke, and their version reached #4 on the U.S. country chart in 1976.

== Background ==
Although Kristofferson’s recording career took a dip with the disappointing Spooky Lady Sideshow, his acting career continued to ascend; after starring in Sam Peckinpah’s Pat Garret and Billy the Kid, he was cast in a supporting role in Martin Scorsese’s Alice Doesn’t Live Here Anymore, which was a smash hit in 1975 and grossed more than $17 million nationwide. Some pointed to Kristofferson’s increased interest in acting as the reason for the decline in his musical success, a sentiment echoed when music publisher Bob Beckham cracked that the singer might want to go back to flying helicopters down to the Gulf Coast, where he had written some of his early famous songs. Kristofferson later stated he was sure “there were some people that really started to get critical of what I was doing. It was as if I were spending so much creative energy on the wrong thing, performing and movies, that my songwriting was suffering. I don’t think it was. I don’t think I’d have done better if I’d been down there in the Gulf still. And certainly, the rest of my life was an exciting thing.” By 1975, the outlaw country movement exploded with the release of Willie Nelson’s Red Headed Stranger, as well as with a string of successful LPs by Waylon Jennings, including the seminal album Honky Tonk Heroes. Although Kristofferson helped as much as any artist to sow the seeds of this new genre, which offered deeper, realistic lyrics rooted in pure country with a rock and roll attitude, Who’s to Bless and Who’s to Blame continued his commercial decline that had started with 1974’s Spooky Lady Sideshow.

== Recording and composition ==
The album was recorded at Sunset Sound in Los Angeles with producer David Anderle, who Kristofferson first worked with on Full Moon, his first collaboration with wife Rita Coolidge. Anderle cut the number of musicians so that there was a smaller palette of sounds, and Mike Utley once more made a major contribution to the overall sound and feel, predominantly laid-back and down-tempo, as did Jerry McGee with some tasteful guitar and dobro. As Streissguth writes:

Despite shrinking sales and blistering reviews, he doggedly pursued his vision, exploring street life in verse and indulging his love of sprawling ballads that featured a colorful cast of characters embroiled in classic narrative conflict. "Silver (The Hunger)" from 1975’s Who’s to Bless and Who’s to Blame, seemed inspired by William Blake’s poetry or a Thomas Hardy novel, portraying in eight minutes a caddish buccaneer who confronts the awakening sensibilities of his naïve lover.

Thematically, the album grapples with the subject of mortality, offering no easy answers but rather asking questions, making the essential point that there are no simple solutions to most moral conundrums. Two songs, "Don’t Cuss the Fiddle" and "The Year 2003 Minus 25", would appear on Waylon Jennings and Willie Nelson’s 1978 duet album, the latter foreshadowing Kristofferson’s increasing political awareness and activism in the coming decade. "Rocket to stardom" was inspired by the practice of some aspiring singers who would sing at the security cameras outside Kristofferson’s Malibu home in the forlorn hope that he or Coolidge would be sold enough to record their songs. (Interestingly, Kristofferson is said to have done the same thing, landing a helicopter on Johnny Cash’s property in the late sixties in hopes of giving the country star a few of his demos.) Another recurring theme in Kristofferson’s songs – the debasement of women – is addressed again in "Easy, Come On".

== Reception ==
Although Johnny Duncan would score a Top 5 country hit with "Stranger", Who’s to Bless and Who’s to Blame was not a commercial success, and radio ignored the single "The Year 2000 Minus 25". Kristofferson biographer Stephen Miller contends "When not derivative – "If It’s All the Same to You" bore a strong resemblance to "Once More with Feeling" – the melodies were generally unmemorable".

== Track listing ==
All songs composed by Kris Kristofferson; except as noted

1. "The Year 2000 Minus 25" – 3:38
2. "If It's All the Same to You" – 3:14
3. "Easy, Come On" – 3:35
4. "Stallion" – 4:44
5. "Rocket to Stardom" (Kristofferson, Roger McGuinn, Bob Neuwirth) – 3:33
6. "Stranger" – 3:07
7. "Who's to Bless and Who's to Blame" – 3:32
8. "Don't Cuss the Fiddle" – 3:21
9. "Silver (The Hunger)" – 8:14

== Personnel ==
- Kris Kristofferson - vocals, 12 and 6 string guitars
- Jerry McGee - electric and acoustic guitars, Dobro
- Fred Tackett - acoustic guitar, mandolin
- Michael Utley - keyboards, Moog synthesizer
- Leland Sklar - bass
- Sammy Creason - drums
- Bobbye Hall - percussion, congas
- Nick DeCaro - accordion
- Clydie King - background vocals
- Venetta Fields - background vocals
- Rita Coolidge - background vocals
- Billy Swan - background vocals
- Terry Paul - background vocals
- Herb Pedersen - background vocals
- Mentor Williams - background vocals
- The 'Rocket to Stardom' Chorus: Billy, Terry, Herb, Mike, Donnie Fritts, Warren Oates

== Production ==
- Produced by David Anderle
- Recording Engineers: John Haeny, Kent Nebergall, Wayne Dailey
- Mixing Engineer: David Anderle
- Recorded at Sunset Sound Studios, Los Angeles, California
- Mastered at The Mastering Lab, Los Angeles, California

== Charts ==
Chart performance for Who's to Bless and Who's to Blame
Chart (1975)	Peak position
US Billboard 200	105
US Top Country Albums (Billboard)	23

== Bibliography ==
- Miller, Stephen (2009). Kristofferson: The Wild American. Omnibus Press. ISBN 9780857121097.
- Streissguth, Michael (2013). Outlaw: Waylon, Willie, Kris, and the Renegades of Nashville. HarperCollins. ISBN 978-0062038180.
