= Rise (perfume) =

Perfume by Beyoncé

Fragrance by Beyoncé
- Released: 2014
- Label: Coty, Inc.
- Predecessor: Heat: The Mrs. Carter Show World Tour
- Successor: Heat: Heat Wild Orchid
- Website: Official Website

Rise (also known as Beyoncé Rise) is a perfume endorsed by Beyoncé and distributed through division Coty Beauty of manufacturer Coty, Inc. She collaborated with perfumer Loc Dong from the company International Flavors & Fragrances (IFF) for creating the scent. It marks her third fragrance following the release of Heat (2010) and Pulse (2011). Inspired by African-American author Maya Angelou and meant to showcase private sides of Beyoncé's personal life, Rise was created as a woman's fragrance.

It was released in February 2014 to various stores; a promotional poster and a commercial shot by English music video director Jake Nava were released the same month with the latter featuring Beyoncé surrounded by golden glitter. Upon their release, the perfume and the commercial were positively received by critics with Rise's various scents and its feminist inspiration being particularly hailed. Rise features top notes of Italian bergamot orange, golden apricot and a basil sorbet middle notes of gold symphony orchid freesia blossom and jasminum sambac and base notes of autumn woods accord, cashmere musk and a vetiver extract.

== Background ==
Beyoncé announced the release of her first fragrance Heat in December 2009 after she had previously worked with Tommy Hilfiger on True Star and with Giorgio Armani on Diamonds for which she also appeared in several promotional campaigns. Heat, released on February 3, 2010, was followed by six additional releases of the same line with various scent changes. It went on to become one of the three best-selling fragrances of all time with $400 million earned at retail globally. A new line of perfumes titled Pulse followed in September 2011 and included several additional releases. The perfume was meant to showcase the singer's persona and energy while performing live on stage during her concerts.

On December 12, 2013, it was reported by MTV that beauty and lifestyle editor Jess Torres of the magazine Siempre Mujer was offered a glimpse of Beyoncé's new perfume called Rise. On December 20, 2013, it was officially announced by fashion magazine Women's Wear Daily that she would release her third line of perfumes titled Rise in early 2014. Perfumer Loc Dong of International Flavors & Fragrances (IFF) served as a collaborator with Beyoncé. The perfume was influenced by Beyoncé's autobiographical HBO documentary Life Is But a Dream (2013); both Rise and the film showcase the singer's personal sides including "inner strength, overcoming adversity, and what it really means to be a woman".

=== Conception ===
Marsha Brooks, a vice president of global marketing for Coty Beauty, a division of Coty, Inc. responsible for Beyoncé's fragrance business, said in an interview that Rise was meant to leave a "strong sense of 'overcoming adversity and rising above it all.'" She added, "The fragrance concept is about female empowerment and finding the inner strength that makes women so beautiful... We're getting a little bit more intimate and personal with this next initiative we are doing. The time has come for something more natural and emotional." According to her, testings for Rise were done in multiple countries with positive feedback.

It was also revealed that the perfume was inspired by a poem by African-American author Maya Angelou. Journalists Katy Waldman of Slate, Kathleen Hou of New York and Treye Green of the International Business Times noted "Still I Rise" from Angelou's book And Still I Rise as a potential inspiration. The fragrance features various notes. The top notes consist of an Italian bergamot orange, golden apricot and a basil sorbet. The middle notes contain gold symphony orchid (identified as Beyoncé's favorite flower), freesia blossom and jasminum sambac. Rise concludes with base notes of autumn woods accord, cashmere musk and a vetiver extract.

== Release and promotion ==
The perfume was shipped in January 2014 and it was released to stores the following month. It was packaged in a tall glass bottle, designed by Ken Hirst, and contained a gold collar and gold crystals. Marissa G. Muller of MTV compared the packaging with the foil of Jay-Z's Gold perfume. According to Beyoncé's official perfume website, it was meant to show her "resilient spirit and graceful femininity".

The promotional poster for Rise was released in early 2014. It features a close-up shot of her face with blonde hair and metallic eye shadow. Reveal magazine writer Brigitte Swimer deemed the photograph "smouldering" and went on to offer praise for Beyoncé looking "breathtaking... rocking flawless skin and perfectly contoured cheeks". Brittany Talarico of People also reviewed the image positively, calling it "sexy" and noting "one of her signature powerhouse stares as her hair blows wildly around her". Talarico concluded that the golden theme matched the perfume's bottle design.

It was estimated by several industry sources that the promotion for the fragrance, which mainly included the commercial and promotion on Facebook, was worth US $10 million and it was predicted the perfume would sell $25 million. In January, 2014, People magazine organized a contest between readers of its website on Twitter asking them to share a photo of the singer in their favorite outfit on their profiles and win a signed bottle of Rise. In celebration of the perfume's release, a contest was also launched by Beyoncé's team asking fans to tell them "what they rise for"; several of them were filmed and their videos were published on Beyoncé's perfume channel. A winner was announced in June 2014 and awarded with a bottle of Rise.

=== Commercial ===
A 30-second clip for the fragrance surfaced on the Internet in January 2014 and several publications reported and speculated it would be the commercial for Rise. A commercial was later officially released in February and was shot by Jake Nava with whom Beyoncé had collaborated frequently. It opens with shots of her showered in gold as she rises out of a glittering bowl formed of dust while dramatic music plays in the background; several of the scenes are filmed using a slow motion technique. Her voiceover is heard in the background, "You can let yourself disappear, or you can stir things up. Never settle, shake loose. Embrace the elements. Because from now on, you will always Rise!". Beyoncé is seen surrounded by glittery ashes, wearing thigh-high gladiator sandals and a bodysuit noted to be Amazonian-inspired.

Brigitte Swimer of Reveal labelled it "sizzling" noting scenes showing Beyoncé "swishing her hair around in true Beyoncé style". Kelly Bryant of OK! magazine called the advertisement "sexy". In an in-depth review of the commercial, Caitlin Morton from MTV heavily praised Beyoncé's look, style, movements and poses for the camera and concluded, "THAT ... is how you sell a perfume". Maeve Keirans writing for the same publication wrote the clip was "heavy on the glitter and hair-flips" and added, "We would've bought Rise anyway, but now [due to its commercial] we're definitely going to buy it." Carl Williott from the website Idolator interpreted Beyoncé's character in the video as a "gold dust woman imploring you to embrace the elements and rise". Charlie Gowans Eglinton of Elle magazine provided a positive review for the clip summarizing, "there's hair–flipping, intense eye–contact and a sultry voiceover, all covered in a layer of gold dust. What more could you ask for?".

== Reception ==
Kristin Booker of the fashion website Refinery29 described the scent as a "voluptuous, sexy floral". Kathleen Hou writing for New York opined that the perfume's best part was that it was inspired by a poem by Angelou. Hou also noted feminist influences in the scent with usual additions of orchid and masculine notes of autumn woods, cashmere, musk, and vetiver extract. She concluded her review by stating "Maya Angelou-reading perfume sounds (and will surely smell) pretty good". With a similar opinion, Treye Green of the International Business Times noted more masculine notes with the addition of woods, cashmere, musk. She hailed Rise as a "sweet treat" for her fans along her self-titled album's surprise release a week earlier and noted, "Beyoncé's definition of feminism has stirred quite the debate following her new album's release. But maybe her perfume version of it will be more openly embraced – plus who can deny the genius of a Maya Angelou-inspired scent." Madison Lafayette in an article for VIBE Vixen praised Beyoncé's decision to release Rise "capitaliz[ing] off" her success and "giving us another reason to talk about her".

Tor Cardona of the magazine Grazia Daily praised the fact the perfume was announced a week after Beyoncé's fifth album, noting she was set for a "world domination" in 2014. Focusing on the scent, Cardona advised female readers to buy it and went on to state "With hints of orchid, golden apricot and jasmine- we reckon this might just be 2014's hottest scent." BET editor Dorkys Ramos described the scent as a mixture of "sexy, floral" notes. The Daily Telegraph's Katy Young called the gold symphony orchid used in the scent "the queen of orchids". She also said that notes of cashmere musk and vetiver "give the whole blend a grounding element" before concluding "the notes are not wrong". Charlie Gowans Eglinton of Elle, noted that the perfume promised to be "almost as intoxicating as Bey herself" with a "sexy scent" of musk according to reports she had read. In a guide for spring perfumes to buy in 2014, editors of E! Online included Rise, calling it "exactly what you think it would be: vivacious, strong and bold" and concluding "it is certainly not a dainty spring scent". Cinya Burton of the same publication noted the fragrance was different than other floral perfumes during the season, deeming it "plain fierce".

== Products ==
Products related to Rise are taken from Beyoncé's official perfume website. Two additional products were released in the collection—a body lotion for hydrating the skin and a shower gel.

Eau de parfume

- 100ml / 3.4 oz
- 50 ml / 1.7 oz
- 30 ml / 1.0 oz
- 15 ml / 0.5 oz

Glistening body lotion

- 200ml / 6.7 oz

Silky shower gel

- 200ml / 6.7 oz

== See also ==
- List of celebrity-branded fragrances
