= Surreal Thing =

Studio album by Kris Kristofferson
- Released: July 1976
- Studios: Sunset Sound, Los Angeles, California
- Genre: Country
- Length: 36:27
- Label: Monument
- Producer: David Anderle

Kris Kristofferson chronology
Who's to Bless and Who's to Blame (1975)	Surreal Thing (1976)	A Star Is Born (1976)

Professional ratings
Review scores
Source	Rating
Allmusic	2.5/5 stars
Rolling Stone	(unfavorable)

Surreal Thing is the seventh solo album by Kris Kristofferson, released in 1976 on Monument Records. "Killing Time" and "The Golden Idol" are re-recordings of songs that were originally released as a single in 1967.

== Background ==
In 1976, Wanted! The Outlaws became country music’s first platinum selling album, bringing progressive country music, or outlaw country, to the mainstream. Ironically, as Kristofferson watched record sales take off for his friends and contemporaries, many of whom were greatly influenced by his work, his own record sales languished. In fact, Kristofferson was becoming more known to the general public as an actor, playing opposite Barbra Streisand in the 1976 blockbuster A Star Is Born. As Streissguth observes in his book Outlaw: Waylon, Willie, Kris and the Renegades of Nashville:

The Outlaw Movement offered little to fuel Kristofferson’s record sales, although his name reverberated right alongside Waylon’s and Willie’s…He had already accomplished an outlaw status independent of the industry’s promotional engine by carving out a place for the earnest singer-songwriter in Nashville and introducing mature themes to country music. Perhaps if he’d been around town more often he might have shown up on Wanted! album, but he had relocated to Malibu, where he spent more time in front of a movie camera than a studio microphone.

Although the drop-off in the quality of Kristofferson’s songwriting is often attributed to his moonlighting as an actor, AllMusic argues that a “better reason is probably a country music-style recording contract that called for him to turn in an album a year consisting of his own all-new compositions, a pace that did not allow him enough time to write songs of the caliber of the standards he produced in the late 1960s and early '70s. 1976's Surreal Thing, his seventh album since 1970 (not counting two duet LPs with his wife, Rita Coolidge), is a good case in point.”

== Recording and composition ==
Kristofferson and producer David Anderle stripped down the instrumentation to just guitars, keyboards, bass, and drums, but employed no less than a dozen backing singers, including Coolidge, Billy Swan, and actor Gary Busey, and Mike Utley once more enriched proceedings with colour and variety while bassist Lee Sklar anchored the sound with simple solidity. The lascivious opener, "You Show Me Yours and I’ll Show You Mine", and the closing track, "If You Don’t Like Hank Williams", were more playful than the tracks found on previous albums, such as 1974’s dour Spooky Lady Sideshow, and on the latter song the singer provides a roll call of his favorite rock and country singers and songwriters, name checking, among others, Johnny Cash, The Eagles, Waylon Jennings, Joni Mitchell, George Jones, and the Rolling Stones. Hank Williams, Jr. would record a typically rowdy version of the song for his 1980 album Habits Old and New.

Accusations that Kristofferson was spreading himself too thin, or that his artistic well had run dry, seemed to be supported by the fact that he rerecorded two tracks that had been previously released as a failed single for Epic Records in 1967, "The Golden idol" and "Killing Time". The AllMusic review notes that the songs were “written in a more verbose style than his current one. ‘The Golden Idol’ sounded heavily influenced by Bob Dylan's mid-'60s poetic approach, while "Killing Time" was a put-down of unimaginative average people". The singer fired back at his critics in the song "Eddie the Eunuch", a bitter diatribe against certain snide elements in the press who he believed had it in for him.

== Reception ==
Although Surreal Thing made the country Top 10, it barely dented the Billboard 100, and the single "It’s Never Gonna Be the Same Again" made no impact. In his AllMusic review of the LP, William Ruhlmann praises the single and "Bad Love Story", but argues that the "spotty quality of the songwriting" was not helped by "arrangements and performances that sometimes seemed like run-throughs and, particularly, Kristofferson's rough vocals, which were often inept". Kristofferson biographer Stephen Miller also laments the quality of Kristofferson’s singing on the album, writing that his vocals "sounded more like a stressed foghorn than ever".

== Track listing ==
All songs composed by Kris Kristofferson

1. "You Show Me Yours (And I'll Show You Mine)" – 3:39
2. "Killing Time" – 3:43
3. "The Prisoner" – 4:25
4. "Eddie the Eunuch" – 2:56
5. "It's Never Gonna Be the Same Again" – 3:54
6. "I Got a Life of My Own" – 3:34
7. "The Stranger I Love" – 4:10
8. "The Golden Idol" – 3:04
9. "Bad Love Story" – 3:31
10. "If You Don't Like Hank Williams" – 3:31

== Personnel ==
- Kris Kristofferson - vocals, guitar, 12-string guitar
- Rita Coolidge, Gary Busey, Clydie King, Jack Skinner, Terry Paul, Herb Pedersen, Allen Wald, Sherlie Matthews, Byron Berline, Billy Swan - backing vocals
- Jerry McGee - guitar, backing vocals
- Michael Utley - synthesizer, backing vocals
- Leland Sklar - bass
- Sammy Creason - drums

Technical

- Ellen Vogt - co-producer
- Jim Isaacson, John Haeny, Kent Nebergall, Marty Lewis - engineer
- John Shannon - photography

== Charts ==
Chart performance for Surreal Thing
Chart (1976)	Peak position
US Billboard 200	180
US Top Country Albums (Billboard)	17
