= Eddie Cooley =

American singer-songwriter (1933–2020)

- Born: Edward James Cooley; April 15, 1933; Atlanta, Georgia, U.S.
- Died: April 15, 2020 (aged 87) Meridian, Mississippi, U.S.
- Genres: R&B
- Occupations: Songwriter, singer

Edward James Cooley (April 15, 1933 – April 15, 2020) was an American R&B singer and songwriter, who co-wrote the much-recorded song "Fever." He also had a US pop hit in 1956 with "Priscilla," credited to Eddie Cooley and the Dimples.

== Life ==
Cooley was born in Atlanta, Georgia, later moving to New York City, where he befriended singer and songwriter Otis Blackwell. Around 1955 he contacted Blackwell with an idea for a song he had written, "Fever." According to Blackwell, Cooley said to him: "Man, I got an idea for a song called 'Fever,' but I can´t finish it." Blackwell finished writing the song, and it was recorded by Little Willie John, becoming an R&B number one hit in 1956, and later being recorded by Peggy Lee, Elvis Presley, Madonna, Beyoncé, and many others.

Cooley and Blackwell continued to collaborate on songs for musicians on the King label, including The 5 Royales and Joe Tex. Later in 1956, Cooley presented a song, "Priscilla," to singer Boyd Bennett, who turned it down. A demo version reached Teddy Reig of Royal Roost Records, and he arranged for Cooley to record it with a backing trio of girl singers, The Dimples – Beverly Coates, Carolyn Coates and Barbara Sanders – who Blackwell had discovered. The record was "something of an anomaly: a black man performing in a rockabilly style." It was promoted by DJ Alan Freed, and after first becoming successful on the east coast rose up the national charts, reaching number 20 on the Billboard pop chart in November 1956. Although Cooley was not primarily a singer, he promoted it by touring. The song was released in the UK on the Columbia label, and also covered by Frankie Vaughan.

Eddie Cooley and the Dimples recorded several further singles for the Royal Roost label, but none were successful. He then returned to songwriting, and his songs were recorded by the female R&B singer Tiny Topsy ("Aw! Shucks, Baby"), and by Buzz Clifford and Conway Twitty. In 1959, he made his last recordings, for Herb Abramson's Triumph label, but again they were unsuccessful. In the early 1960s, after Blackwell had had continued success as a songwriter for Elvis Presley, in particular, he approached Cooley to contribute tracks to the album We Wrote 'Em, We Sing 'Em. Cooley performed "Fever" and "Lay It On" on the album, released by MGM in 1961.

In 2015, Eddie Cooley was reported to be living in Rose Hill, Jasper County, Mississippi. He died at Anderson Regional Medical Center in Meridian, Mississippi on April 15, 2020, his 87th birthday.
