= Look Inside the Asylum Choir =

Studio album by Asylum Choir
- Released: 1968
- Recorded: 1968
- Studios: Skyhill, Hollywood, CA
- Genre: Psychedelic
- Length: 25:53 LP (39:56 bonus CD)
- Label: Smash
- Producers: Leon Russell, Marc Benno

Leon Russell chronology
Look Inside the Asylum Choir (1968)	Leon Russell (1970)

Look Inside the Asylum Choir is the 1968 debut album by Asylum Choir, a studio group consisting of the session musicians Leon Russell and Marc Benno. Russell arranged the songs, complete with sped-up trumpet section, and multi-tracked himself playing piano, guitar and drums. Benno contributed multi-tracked vocals, guitar and bass guitar.

== Release and reception ==
Professional ratings
Review scores
Source	Rating
AllMusic	3/5 stars
The Encyclopedia of Popular Music	3/5 stars
The Rolling Stone Record Guide	2/5 stars
The Village Voice	B

The album was issued by Smash Records in 1968 with catalogue number SRS 67107 (stereo edition). The vinyl's original Smash label designates the name of the album as Look Inside the Asylum Choir by the Asylum Choir, while the album cover titling suggests that it is entitled simply Look Inside. The original gatefold cover featured an image of a roll of toilet paper. The image created sufficient controversy that Smash records reissued the album with a cover featuring a portrait of Russell and Benno.

Look Inside the Asylum Choir received positive reviews from critics in 1968, but sold poorly. Village Voice critic Robert Christgau wrote in 1970 after its re-release that it "more or less" deserved such a reception, deeming it "a nice record to write reviews about: strong studio work with a heavy Zappa flavor, quality of satire ditto".

On May 2, 2011 Rev-Ola Records re-released the album on CD with four bonus tracks. On February 5, 2016 Smash Records re-released the album on CD in the original LP format.

== Track listing LP ==
All songs by Leon Russell and Marc Benno; except where indicated:

1. "Welcome to Hollywood" – 2:35
2. "Soul Food" (Bill Boatman, James Markham) – 2:05
3. "Icicle Star Tree" (Russell, Benno, Wally Wilson) – 2:55
4. "Death of the Flowers" (Russell, Benno, Greg Dempsey) – 2:08
5. "Indian Style" – 3:30
6. "Medley: N.Y. Op./Land of Dog/Henri The Clown" – 6:07
7. "Thieves in the Choir" (Russell, Benno, Jerry Riopelle) – 4:04
8. "Black Sheep Boogaloo" – 2:29

== Track listing CD ==
All songs by Leon Russell and Marc Benno; except where indicated:

1. "Welcome to Hollywood" - 2:45
2. "Soul Food" (Leon Russell, Marc Benno, Bill Boatman, James Markham) - 2:10
3. "Icicle Star Tree" (Leon Russell, Marc Benno, Wally Wilson) - 3:03
4. "Death of the Flowers" (Leon Russell, Marc Benno, Greg Dempsey) - 3:15
5. "Indian Style" - 3:46
6. Medley: "N.Y. Op./Land of Dog/Henri The Clown" - 6:07
7. "Thieves in the Choir" (Leon Russell, Marc Benno, Jerry Riopelle) - 4:04
8. "Black Sheep Boogaloo" - 2:29
9. "Soul Food" (Leon Russell, Marc Benno, Bill Boatman, James Markham) - 2:19
10. "Welcome to Hollywood" - 3:03
11. "Icicle Star Tree" (Leon Russell, Marc Benno, Wally Wilson) - 3:07
12. "Indian Style" - 3:44
- Bonus Tracks 9–12 Mono single versions

== Personnel ==
- Leon Russell - producer, piano, lead vocals
- Marc Benno - producer, guitar, lead vocals
- Joe Foster - re-issue producer, synthesizer
- Andy Morten - re-issue producer, artwork, design, liner notes
- Nick Robbins - synthesizer
- Lou Kimzey - design
- Gordon Rudd - engineer
- Ralph Poole - photography

== In usage ==
The sixth track "Medley: N.Y. Op./Land of Dog/Henri The Clown" was sampled in singer Usher's song "Get In My Car" featuring rapper Bun B which appears in the EP Versus and the deluxe edition of his album Raymond v. Raymond.
