= Priscilla (Eddie Cooley song) =

1956 song by Eddie Cooley

"Priscilla" is a 1956 song written by Eddie Cooley, which was a hit with his band The Dimples.

The song was covered by:

- Frankie Vaughan with Wally Stott and his Orchestra and Chorus 1957
- Buddy Lucas 1957
- Dave Burgess and the Toppers 1957
- The Four Jones Boys 1956
- Gus Backus 1961
- Julius La Rosa 1956
- Kevin Young 1961
- Les Brown and his Band of Renown 1956
- The Mercuries 1957
