= Breakaway (Kris Kristofferson and Rita Coolidge album) =

1974 studio album

Studio album by Kris Kristofferson and Rita Coolidge
- Released: December 1974
- Genre: Country
- Length: 34:41
- Label: Monument
- Producer: Fred Foster

Kris Kristofferson chronology
Spooky Lady's Sideshow (1974)	Breakaway (1974)	Who's to Bless and Who's to Blame (1975)

Rita Coolidge chronology
Fall into Spring (1974)	Breakaway (1974)	It's Only Love (1975)

Professional ratings
Review scores
Source	Rating
AllMusic	3/5 stars
The Village Voice	B−

Breakaway is the second duet album by Kris Kristofferson and Rita Coolidge, released in 1974 on Monument Records. It is one of three duet albums by the couple. Unlike Kristofferson solo albums, it features several covers. "I've Got to Have You" and "I'd Rather Be Sorry" had both previously been hits for other artists; they appear here by Kristofferson for the first time.

== Recording ==
The couple’s first album, Full Moon, had been a chart topping success, going gold and receiving a Grammy for Best Country Vocal Performance by a Duo or Group for the track "From the Bottle to the Bottom.” However, Kristofferson’s commercial stock had dropped with 1974’s Spooky Lady Sideshow, and Breakaway would not be as successful as the pair’s debut LP, making the country Top 5 but just scraping the bottom of the Billboard Top 100. A&M and Monument agreed to take turns releasing the duo’s LPs, and since it was Monument’s turn, longtime Kristofferson producer Fred Foster was back at the helm, but, as with Full Moon, the emphasis was on an easy listening MOR sound aimed mainly at Rita’s lustrous vocal prowess. Although it was not the hit Full Moon had been, AllMusic’s William Rulhmann opines, “In any case, the album was a worthy successor to Full Moon. The Kristofferson/Coolidge albums were very different from each artist's solo albums, though somewhat closer to Coolidge's because they consisted largely of cover songs and the keys were set to her voice, with Kristofferson singing at the upper edge of his narrow range. This forced him to work harder and sing more, which made him a better vocalist than he usually was on his own albums.”

As on their first LP together, Breakaway is mostly populated by covers, as well as a pair of Kristofferson compositions that had been hits for other artists: "I’d Rather Be Sorry,” which was a hit for Ray Price in 1971; and “I’ve Got to Have You,” which charted for Sammi Smith in 1972. The couple also recorded the classic George Jones-Melba Montgomery duet “We Must Have Been Out of Our Minds.” Two singles, “Lover Please” (which would go on to win the 1975 Grammy Award for Best Country Vocal Performance by a Duo or Group) and the Larry Gatlin-penned “Rain” were minor country hits. Kristofferson biographer Stephen Miller speculates that the tepid reaction to the album “was probably due to there being too much material by Kris and Rita on the market; since the start of the Seventies, aside from the two duet collaborations, they had amassed 10 solo albums between them.”

== Track listing ==
1. "Lover Please" (Billy Swan) – 3:03
2. "We Must Have Been Out of Our Minds" (Melba Montgomery) – 2:33
3. "Dakota" (Larry Murray) – 3:06
4. "What'cha Gonna Do?" (Donnie Fritts, Jon Reid) – 2:48
5. "The Things I Might Have Been" (Robert B. Sherman, Richard M. Sherman) – 3:09
6. "Slow Down" (Kristofferson) – 3:06
7. "Rain" (Larry Gatlin) – 3:41
8. "Sweet Susannah" (Floyd "Gib" Guilbeau) – 3:19
9. "I've Got to Have You" (Kristofferson) – 3:31
10. "I'd Rather Be Sorry" (Kristofferson) – 3:08
11. "Crippled Crow" (Donna Weiss) – 3:14

== Personnel ==
- Kris Kristofferson – vocals
- Rita Coolidge – vocals
- Michael Utley – keyboards
- Bobby Wood – keyboards
- Bobby Emmons – organ
- Shane Keister – Moog synthesizer
- Johnny Christopher – guitars
- Jimmy Colvard – guitars
- Ray Edenton – guitars
- Jerry Shook – guitars
- Chip Young – guitars
- Reggie Young – guitars
- Weldon Myrick – steel guitar
- Tommy Cogbill – bass
- Gene Chrisman – drums
- Sammy Creason – drums
- Farrell Morris – percussion
- Buddy Spicher – fiddle
- Charlie McCoy – horns, harmonica, bass harmonica, melodica
- Ronald Eades – horns
- Harvey Thompson – horns
- Charles Rose – horns
- Harrison Calloway – horns
- Don Sheffield – horns
- Bill Justis – string arrangements
- Byron Bach, Brenton Banks, George Binkley III, Marvin Chantry, Martin Katahn, Sheldon Kurland, Martha McCrory, Pamela Sixfin, Gary Vanosdale and Stephanie Woolf – string players
- Billy Swan – backing vocals (1, 3, 4, 6)
- Larry Gatlin – backing vocals (7)

=== Production ===
- Fred Foster – producer
- Chip Young – engineer
- Paul Richmond – mastering

== Charts ==
Chart performance for Breakaway
Chart (1974–75)	Peak position
Australian Albums (Kent Music Report)	99
Canada Top Albums/CDs (RPM)	81
US Billboard 200	103
US Top Country Albums (Billboard)	19
