= Marc Benno =

American singer-songwriter

- Born: July 1, 1947 (age 78)
- Origin: Dallas, Texas, United States
- Genres: Blues, R&B
- Occupation(s): Musician, session musician, composer
- Instrument(s): Guitar, piano, vocals
- Years active: 1968–present
- Labels: A&M, Shelter Records, Blue Skunk Music
- Website: www.marcbenno.com

Marc Benno (born July 1, 1947, in Dallas, Texas) is an American singer-songwriter and guitarist.

Benno teamed with Leon Russell to form the Asylum Choir in the late 1960s. He launched a solo career in the early 1970s, with the 1972 album Ambush being his most commercially successful. He wrote the song "Rock 'n Roll Me Again", which was recorded by the band The System for the soundtrack of the 1985 film Beverly Hills Cop; the soundtrack won a Grammy Award. Benno also worked with musicians such as The Doors, Eric Clapton, Stevie Ray Vaughan, Clarence White and Rita Coolidge. Benno was the second guitar player on several tracks for the Doors' album L.A. Woman, alongside Robby Krieger.

== Discography ==
=== Albums ===
Year	Album	Peak chart positions	
Year	Album	US	AUS
1968	Look Inside the Asylum Choir (with Leon Russell)	—	—
1970	Marc Benno	—	—
1971	Minnows	—	—
1971	Asylum Choir II (with Leon Russell)	70	54
1972	Ambush	171	—
1979	Lost in Austin	—	—
1990	Take It Back To Texas	—	—
1994	Snake Charmer	—	—
2000	Sugar Blues	—	—
2002	Live in Gillespie County	—	—
2003	Golden Treasure	—	—
2003	Hit The Bottom	—	—
2004	I Got It Bad	—	—
2005	Live at the Chi Chi Club (with John Cipollina, Pete Sears)	—	—
2006	Crawlin (with Stevie Ray Vaughan, Doyle Bramhall)	—	—
2007	Live in Japan	—	—
2007	Shadow	—	—
2011	From the Vault	—	—
2011	Live at the Pour House	—	—
2012	Nearly Famous	—	—
