= David Anderle =

American record producer (1937–2014)

- Anderle next to his painting of Brian Wilson
- Born: July 9, 1937; Los Angeles, California, U.S.
- Died: September 1, 2014 (aged 77); Los Angeles, California, U.S.
- Occupations: Record producer, A&R man, portrait artist, talent manager

David Anderle (July 9, 1937 – September 1, 2014) was an American A&R man, record producer, and portrait artist. He is best known for his business associations with the Beach Boys during the production of the band's unfinished album Smile and the formation of the group's company Brother Records. Anderle also worked for MGM, Elektra, and A&M Records, and later acted as music supervisor on films including The Breakfast Club (1985), Pretty in Pink (1986), Good Morning, Vietnam (1987), and Scrooged (1988).

== Background ==
David Anderle was born in eastern Los Angeles and raised in nearby Inglewood. He graduated in June 1955 from Fairfax High School in Los Angeles, where his schoolmates included Herb Alpert, Jerry Moss, and producer Shel Talmy. Following this, he attended the University of Southern California drama school with Michael Vosse. In 1964, he began working in A&R at MGM Records, which also owned the Verve label, and convinced the label to sign Frank Zappa and the Mothers of Invention in 1965. He also worked as the manager of singer Danny Hutton and session musician Van Dyke Parks.

Anderle was a "prominent member" of the Community for Fact and Freedom (CAFF), an organization formed by Byrds manager Jim Dickson, and whose headquarters was located in the office of former Beatles press officer Derek Taylor, who soon became the Beach Boys' publicist. According to Beach Boys biographer Steven Gaines, during this period, Anderle was nicknamed "the Mayor of Hip" by underground newspapers.

Music historian Keith Badman characterized Anderle as "an artist who ... skipped back and forth between painting and the record business, with mixed results in both. As an executive for MGM Records he [earned] himself a reputation as a genius by purportedly thinking up the million-dollar-movie-TV-record offer that ... briefly [lured] Bob Dylan to MGM from Columbia in 1967 – until everybody has a change of heart and Dylan decides to go back home to Columbia."

== The Beach Boys ==
Through his cousin Bill Bloom, who had been friends with the Wilson brothers as children, Anderle was introduced to Brian Wilson in early 1965, although the two were not closely acquainted until mid-1966, when the Beach Boys were recording the "Good Vibrations" single. According to Anderle, "I decided to become associated with Brian because his music was killing me. I loved it. Then, all of a sudden, there were new elements in his life. A lot of the contacts I had made here in the so-called underground started paying attention ..." Gaines credits Anderle as the primary conduit between Wilson and the "hip" associates that surrounded him in this period.

In October 1966, Anderle accepted Wilson's offer to head Brother Records, a new record company formed by the Beach Boys. Wilson exhibited declining mental health during this time. One of the well-known stories involved a portrait of Wilson that Anderle had been painting in secret for several months. When he showed the painting to Wilson, Wilson believed that the portrait had literally captured his soul. In biographer Peter Ames Carlin's description,

Painting from memory, Anderle had produced a dark, moody vision of Brian, his skin the color of alabaster, his mouth bent in a curious smile, his blazing eyes peering out of a blackness that bristled with icons and figures. ... Everything about the painting struck [Brian] as extraordinarily significant, from the way the spray of icons hovered in the background to the numerological significance of their number and order.

Anderle later said that he felt his relationship with Wilson was never the same afterward. The last time Wilson was visited by Anderle to discuss business matters, Wilson refused to leave his bedroom. Frustrated by Wilson's behavior, Anderle disassociated from the group and Brother Records by April 1967.

A published conversation between Anderle and journalist Paul Williams, serialized in Crawdaddy in 1968, was one of the earliest resources for information regarding the Smile album. In 1971, Anderle became the first to allege, in print, that the remark "don't fuck with the formula" was spoken by Beach Boy Mike Love. Another conversation between Anderle and Williams, from 1997, was published in the form of a chapter in Williams' book How Deep Is the Ocean?.

== Later work ==
In 1968, Anderle moved to Elektra Records, where he worked with such acts as Judy Collins, David Ackles, the Doors, Bread and Love. In 1970, he joined A&M Records, working as a staff producer and A&R person for the company set up by Herb Alpert and Jerry Moss. His production credits included albums for Rita Coolidge, Amy Grant, Delaney and Bonnie, Kris Kristofferson, Aaron Neville, Chris De Burgh, Rhinoceros, Ozark Mountain Daredevils, Doc Holliday and the Circle Jerks.

At A&M, he later took charge of film music, and supervised the music on films including The Breakfast Club (1985), Pretty in Pink (1986), Good Morning, Vietnam (1987), and Scrooged (1988). Keith Forsey credited Anderle with convincing Simple Minds to record "Don't You (Forget About Me)" for the soundtrack of The Breakfast Club.

== Death ==
Anderle retired in 1999. On September 1, 2014, he died from cancer at the age of 77.
