= Rita Coolidge discography =

This is the discography for American singer Rita Coolidge.

== Studio albums ==
List of studio albums, with selected chart positions, sales figures and certifications
Title	Album details	Peak chart positions								Certifications
Title	Album details	US	US Country	AU	CAN	JAP	NET	NZ	UK	Certifications
Rita Coolidge	Released: February 1971; Label: A&M Records; Formats: LP	105	—	—	71	—	—	—	—	
Nice Feelin'	Released: November 1971; Label: A&M Records; Formats: LP	135	—	—	—	—	—	—	—	
The Lady's Not for Sale	Released: October 1972; Label: A&M, MFP; Formats: LP	46	—	—	27	—	—	—	—	
Full Moon (with Kris Kristofferson)	Released: September 1973; Label: A&M; Formats: LP	26	1	40	7	—	—	—	—	RIAA: Gold
Fall into Spring	Released: April 1974; Label: A&M Records; Formats: LP	55	—	96	41	—	—	—	—	
Breakaway (with Kris Kristofferson)	Released: December 1974; Label: Monument Records; Formats: LP	103	19	99	81	—	—	—	—	
It's Only Love	Released: November 1975; Label: A&M Records; Formats: LP	85	—	—	—	—	—	—	—	
Anytime...Anywhere	Released: March 1977; Label: A&M Records; Formats: LP	6	23	9	4	—	15	40	7	RIAA: Platinum; ARIA: Platinum; BPI: Gold; MC: Platinum
Love Me Again	Released: May 1978; Label: A&M Records; Formats: LP	32	—	26	39	—	—	—	51	RIAA: Gold; ARIA: Gold; BPI: Silver; MC: Gold
Natural Act (with Kris Kristofferson)	Released: December 1978; Label: A&M Records; Formats: LP	106	24	87	—	—	—	—	35	
Satisfied	Released: September 1979; Label: A&M Records; Formats: LP	95	—	59	58	65	—	—	—	MC: Gold
Heartbreak Radio	Released: August 1981; Label: A&M Records; Formats: LP	160	—	—	—	—	—	—	—	
Never Let You Go	Released: October 1983; Label: A&M Records; Formats: LP	—	—	—	—	—	15	—	—	
Inside the Fire	Released: 1984; Label: A&M Records; Formats: LP	—	—	—	—	—	—	—	—	
Fire me Back	Released: 1990; Label: Attic; Formats: LP, CD	—	—	—	—	—	75	—	—	
Dancing with an Angel	Released: July 21, 1991; Label: Attic; Formats: CD	—	—	—	—	16	—	—	—	
Love Lessons	Released: 1992; Label: Caliber Records, Critique; Formats: CD	—	—	—	—	—	—	—	—	
For You	Released: 1993; Label: Alpha; Formats: CD	—	—	—	—	—	—	—	—	
Behind the Memories	Released: 1995; Label: Pony Canyon; Formats: CD	—	—	—	—	—	—	—	—	
Out of the Blues	Released: 1996; Label: Beacon; Formats: CD	—	—	—	—	—	—	—	—	
Cherokee	Released: 1996; Label: Indelible Records; Formats: CD	—	—	—	—	—	—	—	—	
Thinkin' About You	Released: 1998; Label: Innerworks; Formats: CD	—	—	—	—	—	—	—	—	
And So Is Love	Released: 2005; Label: Concord Records; Formats: CD	—	—	—	—	—	—	—	—	
A Rita Coolidge Christmas	Released: 2012; Label: 429 Records; Formats: CD	—	—	—	—	—	—	—	—	
Safe in the Arms of Time	Released: 2018; Label: Blue Élan Records; Formats: CD	—	—	—	—	—	—	—	—	

== Compilation albums ==
List of compilation albums, with selected chart positions, sales figures and certifications
Title	Album details	Peak chart positions							Certifications
Title	Album details	US	US Country	CAN	JAP	NET	NZ	UK	Certifications
All About Rita Coolidge	Released: 1979; Label: A&M Records; Formats: LP	—	—	—	—	—	—	—	
Greatest Hits (released as Fool That I Am in Australia)	Released: 1980; Label: A&M Records; Formats: LP	107	—	—	20	—	—	—	
The Very Best of Rita Coolidge	Released: 1981; Label: A&M Records; Formats: LP	—	—	—	—	—	—	6	BPI: Gold
Love from Tokyo	Released: 1984; Label: A&M Records; Formats: LP	—	—	—	48	—	—	—	
Classics Volume 5	Released: 1987; Label: A&M Records; Formats: LP	—	—	—	—	—	—	—	
A&M Gold Series	Released: 1989; Label: A&M Records; Formats: CD	—	—	—	—	—	—	—	
All Time High: Best of Rita Coolidge	Released: 1994; Label: A&M Records; Formats: CD	—	—	—	—	—	—	—	
The Collection	Released: 1995; Label: Spectrum Music; Formats: CD	—	—	—	—	—	—	—	
Master Series	Released: 1999; Label: A&M Records; Formats: CD	—	—	—	—	—	—	—	
20th Century Masters – The Millenium Collection	Released: 2000; Label: A&M Records; Formats: CD	—	—	—	—	—	—	—	
Universal Masters Collection	Released: 2001; Label: A&M Records; Formats: CD	—	—	—	—	—	—	—	
Delta Lady – The Rita Coolidge Anthology	Released: 2004; Label: A&M Records; Formats: CD	—	—	—	—	—	—	—	

== Singles ==
Year	Single	Peak chart positions								Certification	Album
Year	Single	US	US AC	US Country	CA	CA AC	CA Country	UK	AU	Certification	Album
1969	"Turn Around and Love You"	96	—	—	—	—	—	—	—		single only
1971	"I Believe in You"	—	—	—	38	16	—	—	—		Rita Coolidge
1972	"Fever"	76	—	—	—	—	—	—	—		The Lady's Not for Sale
1973	"My Crew"^{A}	flip	38	—	—	—	—	—	—		The Lady's Not for Sale
1973	"Whiskey, Whiskey"	106	—	—	—	—	—	—	—		The Lady's Not for Sale
1973	"A Song I'd Like to Sing" (w/Kris Kristofferson)	49	12	92	53	3	54	—	97		Full Moon
1974	"Loving Arms" (w/Kris Kristofferson)	86	25	98	83	9	—	—	96		Full Moon
1974	"Mama Lou"	—	—	94	—	—	—	—	—		Fall Into Spring
1974	"Rain" (w/Kris Kristofferson)	—	44	87	—	40	—	—	—		Breakaway
1975	"Lover Please" (w/Kris Kristofferson)	—	42	—	—	—	—	—	—		Breakaway
1977	"(Your Love Has Lifted Me) Higher and Higher"	2	5	—	1	3	—	48	6^{B}	RIAA: Gold	Anytime...Anywhere
1977	"We're All Alone"	7	1	82	5	1	—	6	32	RIAA: Gold	Anytime...Anywhere
1978	"The Way You Do the Things You Do"	20	9	—	16	6	—	—	74		Anytime...Anywhere
1978	"Words"	—	—	—	—	—	—	25	—		Anytime...Anywhere
1978	"You"	25	3	—	17	1	—	—	—		Love Me Again
1978	"The Jealous Kind"	—	—	63	—	—	—	—	—		Love Me Again
1978	"Love Me Again"	68	20	83	73	35	—	—	—		Love Me Again
1978	"Slow Dancer"	—	—	—	—	—	—	—	60		Love Me Again
1979	"Hello, Love, Goodbye"	—	—	—	—	27	—	—	—		Love Me Again
1979	"One Fine Day"	66	15	—	89	4	—	—	68		Satisfied
1979	"I'd Rather Leave While I'm in Love"	38	3	32	87	1	24	—	—		Satisfied
1980	"Somethin' 'Bout You Baby I Like" (w/Glen Campbell)	42	39	60	—	36	23	—	—		Somethin' Bout You Baby I Like (Glen Campbell album)
1980	"Fool That I Am"	46	15	72	—	—	52	—	—		Coast to Coast soundtrack
1980	"We Could Stay Together" (w/Booker T. Jones)	—	—	—	—	—	—	—	60		The Best of You (Booker T. Jones album)
1981	"Let's Go Dancing" (w/Booker T. Jones)	—	—	—	—	—	—	—	60		Satisfied
1981	"The Closer You Get"	103	—	—	—	16	—	—	—		Heartbreak Radio
1983	"Lake Freeze"	—	—	—	—	—	—	—	—		Lake Freeze – The Raccoons Songtrack
1983	"All Time High"	36	1	—	38	1	—	75	80		Octopussy soundtrack
1983	"Only You"	—	37	—	—	—	—	—	—		Never Let You Go
1984	"Something Said Love"	—	15	—	—	—	—	—	—		Inside the Fire
1990	"I Stand in Wonder"	—	—	—	49	21	—	—	—		Fire Me Back

- ^{A} B-side of "Fever"
- ^{B} Charted as a double A-side in Australia backed with "I Don't Want to Talk About It"
