= Greatest Hits (Rita Coolidge album) =

Greatest hits album by Rita Coolidge
- Released: 1980
- Genre: Pop
- Label: A&M

Rita Coolidge chronology
| Satisfied (1979) | Greatest Hits (1980) | Heartbreak Radio (1981) |

Greatest Hits is a 1980 album by Rita Coolidge and was released on the A&M Records label. This was her first compilation album and contains all previously released material. The only song that did not appear on a previous Rita Coolidge album is "Fool That I Am", which was from the movie soundtrack album Coast to Coast.

== Track listing ==
=== Side one ===
1. "Born Under a Bad Sign" (Booker T. Jones, William Bell) – 4:10
2. "We're All Alone" (Boz Scaggs) – 3:38
3. "Fool That I Am" (Bruce Roberts, Carole Bayer Sager) – 3:07
4. "Your Love Has Lifted Me (Higher and Higher)" (Paul Smith, Gary Jackson, Raynard Miner, Billy Davis) – 3:55
5. "Nice Feelin'" (Marc Benno) – 5:26
6. "The Way You Do The Things You Do" (William "Smokey" Robinson, Robert Rogers) – 3:35

=== Side two ===
1. "I'd Rather Leave While I'm in Love" (Carole Bayer Sager, Peter Allen) – 3:28
2. "Words" (Barry Gibb, Robin Gibb, Maurice Gibb) – 3:25
3. "Only You Know and I Know" (Dave Mason) – 3:36
4. "I Don't Want to Talk About It" (Danny Whitten) – 3:36
5. "Fever" (Johnny Davenport, Eddie Cooley) – 3:28
6. "Am I Blue" (Grant Clarke, Harry Akst) – 4:37

== Charts ==
| Chart (1980) | Peak position |
|---|---|
| Australian (Kent Music Report)| | 97 |
| US Billboard 200 | 107 |
