= Voices (Kenny Thomas album) =

Studio album by Kenny Thomas
- Released: 14 October 1991
- Recorded: 1990–91
- Genres: Blue-eyed soul; R&B; pop
- Length: 51:24
- Label: Cooltempo
- Producers: Glen Gunner; Tim Lever; Mike Percy

Kenny Thomas chronology
Voices (1991)	Wait for Me (1993)

Voices is the debut album by English soul singer Kenny Thomas, released in 1991. It features the hit singles "Thinking About Your Love", "The Best of You", "Outstanding" and "Tender Love", all of which reached the UK top 40. The album reached No. 3 on the UK Albums Chart.

== Background ==
Thomas was signed to Cooltempo Records in 1990, releasing a cover of the Gap Band's "Outstanding" as the first single from the album. Produced by Glen Gunner, the song entered the UK Singles Chart and eventually peaked at No. 12 when re-released in early 1991. A few months later, the singer scored his biggest hit with "Thinking About Your Love" which reached No. 4 and remained on the charts for three months. Unlike the rest of the songs on the album, this was produced by ex-Dead or Alive members Tim Lever and Mike Percy. A third single, "Best of You" (another top 20 hit) heralded the release of Voices in October 1991. The album peaked at No. 3 on the UK Albums Chart and was certified platinum a month later for sales of over 300,000. A fourth and final single, "Tender Love" was released in the run up to Christmas, peaking at No. 26. The album also reached the charts in New Zealand, where Thomas had scored a top 10 hit with "Outstanding", peaking at No. 45.

In February 1992, Thomas scored two BRIT nominations for Best British Male Singer and Best Newcomer. Thomas followed-up Voices two years later with Wait for Me, which although went top 10, fell short of the high sales set by his debut.

== Track listing ==
1. "Outstanding" (Raymond Calhoun) – 4:33
2. "Best of You" (Booker T Jones) – 3:44
3. "Tender Love" (Jimmy Jam and Terry Lewis) – 4:06
4. "Were We Ever in Love" (Ian Green, Kenny Thomas) – 3:55
5. "Something Special" (Stevens, Brown, Shavari) – 4:45
6. "If You Believe" (David Frank, Tony Fenelle, Tracey Amos) – 4:30
7. "Will I Ever See Your Face" (Ian Green, Kenny Thomas) – 5:02
8. "Thinking About Your Love" (Jim Williams, Michael Ward, Shaun Ward) – 4:54
9. "Voices" (Ian Green, Kenny Nicholas, Kenny Thomas, Trevor Jacobs) – 4:19
10. "Girlfriend" (Bert Price, Horace Scott) – 4:41
11. "Will I Ever See Your Face" (reprise) (Ian Green, Kenny Thomas) – 0:53

CD bonus track

12. "Best of You" (Touchdown Mix) (Booker T Jones) – 6:02

== Personnel ==
Adapted from AllMusic.

- Tracy Ackerman – background vocals
- Steve Davies – engineer
- Simon Dunmore – additional production, remixing
- Richie Fermie – drum programming, keyboard programming
- Claudia Fontaine – background vocals
- Simon Fowler – photography
- Vinney Gee – drums
- Chyna Gordon – background vocals
- Ian Green – guitar, keyboard programming, MIDI bass, background vocals
- Glen Gunner – producer
- Janice Hoyte – background vocals
- Trevor Jacobs – background vocals
- Carol Leeming – background vocals
- Tim Lever – drum programming, keyboard programming, producer
- John Lyons – engineer
- Deborah Miller – background vocals
- Kenny Nicholas – background vocals
- Mike Percy – drum programming, keyboard programming, producer
- Kevin Reynolds – saxophone
- Sonya Roche – background vocals
- Shovel – percussion
- Kenny Thomas – keyboards, primary artist, vocals, background vocals
