= Touch and Go (album) =

Studio album by Force M.D.'s
- Released: 1987
- Genres: R&B, soul
- Label: Tommy Boy
- Producers: Geoff Gurd; Martin Lascelles; Hubert Eaves III; Victor Bailey; Poogie Bell; Robin Halpin; Richard Scher; James Edward White, Jr.; LeRoi Evans; Eric Calvi

Force M.D.'s chronology
Chillin' (1985)	Touch and Go (1987)	Step to Me (1990)

Touch and Go is the third album by the American vocal group Force M.D.'s, released in 1987. "Love Is a House" was the first single; "Couldn't Care Less" was also released. The group supported the album by playing shows with Madonna and Alexander O'Neal.

== Production ==
Nine producers contributed to the recording of Touch and Go, which was marked by a more mainstream sound. Force M.D.'s felt they were known primarily for their ballads, so the group made sure that some dance tracks were included on the album. "Would You Love Me?" was influenced by go-go music and rap. The title track was written by Victor Bailey.

== Critical reception ==
Professional ratings
Review scores
Source	Rating
AllMusic	3/5 stars
Los Angeles Times	2/4 stars
The Philadelphia Inquirer	4/4 stars
The Rolling Stone Album Guide	2/5 stars
The Virgin Encyclopedia of Dance Music	4/5 stars

The Los Angeles Times wrote that, "on the whole, the gooey, studio-crafted music on the third album by the New York quartet is so far removed from the street that even the silkiest smooth singing is undermined... Occasional attempts at incorporating hip-hop styles into the arrangements sound gratuitous and gimmicky." The Christian Science Monitor determined that, "from rap to ballads, to disco/funk, they do it all, without sounding like a hodgepodge ... their youthful, sweet sound continues to charm." The Philadelphia Inquirer opined that "Love Is a House" "is the finest sustained pop metaphor in some time, as are the doo-wop harmonies that make the song surge with strength and beauty." The Washington Post concluded that, "with its quietly fiery performances and seductively glossy production, Touch and Go is superior neo-soul." Nelson George, in Billboard, listed Touch and Go among the best albums of 1987. Trouser Press deemed the album "a lightweight delight."

AllMusic stated: "The production on Touch and Go is crisp and super polished, which is standard for an era just discovering the world of digital production."

== Track listing ==
No.	Title	Writer(s)	Producer(s)	Length
1.	"Love Is a House"	Martin Lascelles; Geoff Gurd; Gina Foster	Gurd; Lascelles	5:06
2.	"Would You Love Me?"	Robert Lewis	Hubert Eaves III	5:03
3.	"Touch and Go"	Victor Bailey; Poogie Bell; Antoine Lundy	Bailey; Bell	4:57
4.	"Couldn't Care Less"	Richard Scher; Anne Godwin	Robin Halpin; Scher	5:30
5.	"Your Love Drives Me Crazy"	James Edward White, Jr.	White, Jr.	5:10
6.	"Midnite Lover"	LeRoi Evans; Halpin; Godwin	Evans; Halpin	5:02
7.	"Take Your Love Back"	Bailey; Bell	Bailey; Bell	4:48
8.	"Sweet Dreams"	Halpin; Lundy	Halpin; Eric Calvi	4:34

== Personnel ==
Force MDs

- T.C.D. Lundy
- Trisco Pearson
- Stevie D. Lundy
- Mercury Nelson

Musicians

- Victor Bailey – arrangements, bass, and bells (3, 7)
- Poogie Bell – arrangements, drum programming, keyboards, and percussion (3, 7)
- Alex Bugnon – keyboards (3)
- Mike Campbell – guitar (3, 7)
- Mike Claxton – drum programming, percussion programming, and additional vocal arrangements (2)
- Force MDs – background arrangements (2)
- Hubert Eaves III – keyboards, synthesizer programming, drum programming, percussion programming, additional vocal arrangements, and background arrangements (2)
- Hubert Eaves IV – bass (2)
- LeRoi Evans – keyboards, drums, and rhythm arrangement (6)
- Gina Foster – additional vocal arrangements (1)
- Anne Godwin – additional vocal arrangements (4)
- Derek Green – additional vocal arrangements (1)
- Geoff Gurd – arrangements (1)
- Thom Hall – synthesizer programming (5)
- Robin Halpin – arrangements (4, 6, 8), Synclavier programming (4, 6, 8), additional programming (4), additional keyboards (6, 8)
- Bob Huott – Synclavier assistance (6), programming and assisting (8)
- Bashiri Johnson – percussion (8)
- Martin Lascelles – arrangements (1)
- Robert Lewis – original arrangements (2)
- Fred McFarlane – keyboards and drums (8)
- Morris Michael – additional vocal arrangements (1)
- Luis Resto – keyboards (5)
- Richard Scher – arrangements, keyboards, drums, and rhythm arrangement (4)
- Ira Siegal – guitar (4), twelve-string guitar (8)
- Jeff Smith – saxophone (4)
- Harold Thomas – saxophone (5)
- Jim White – drum, strong, and vocal arrangements (5)
- Doug Wimbish – bass (4)

Technical personnel

- Victor Bailey – mixing (3, 7)
- Poogie Bell – mixing (3, 7)
- Steve Boyer – recording engineer (1)
- Brains – recording engineer (1)
- Eric Calvi – mixing, recording engineer, and mix engineer (8)
- Pete Diorio – recording and mix engineer (2)
- Hubert Eaves III – mixing (2)
- LeRoi Evans – mixing (6)
- Franklyn Grant – recording engineer (7)
- Bruce Gray – mix engineer (1)
- Alan Gregorie – mix engineer (6)
- Geoff Gurd – mixing (1)
- Robin Halpin – mixing (4, 6, 8), recording engineer (8)
- Bob Huott – assistant engineer (4, 6)
- George Karna – assistant engineer (3)
- Gail King – editing (6)
- Martin Lascelles – mixing (1)
- Jeff Lord-Alge – recording engineer (3, 7), mix engineer (7)
- Monica Lynch – executive producer
- George Meyers Jr. – assistant engineer (3)
- Alan Meyerson – mixing (5), recording engineer (3), mix engineer (3, 4), overdub engineer (8)
- Jeff Neiblum – recording engineer (5)
- Rob Paustian – recording engineer (4, 6, 8)
- Mike Potash – recording and mix engineer (2)
- Herb Powers, Jr. – mastering
- Ken Quarterone – assistant engineer (7)
- Greg Reilly – recording engineer (5)
- Richard Scher – mixing (4)
- Tony Smalios – assistant engineer (7)
- Jim White – recording engineer (5)
