= Chillin' (Force MDs album) =

Studio album by Force MDs
- Released: December 15, 1985
- Studio: Tommy Boy, Unique Recording, and Quadrasonic (New York City, New York): Flyte Tyme (Minneapolis, Minnesota)
- Genre: Hip hop, pop, R&B
- Length: 36:51
- Label: Tommy Boy
- Producer: Robin Halpin (tracks 1–4, 7, 8; additional production on track 6): Joey Gardner and John Hickman (track 5); Jimmy Jam and Terry Lewis (track 6)

Force MDs chronology
Love Letters (1984)	Chillin' (1985)	Touch and Go (1987)

Chillin' is a studio album by the American R&B vocal group Force MDs, released in 1985. The hit single "Tender Love" first appeared on the Krush Groove soundtrack.

The album peaked at No. 69 on the Billboard 200.

== Production ==
The album was mostly produced by Tommy Boy house producer Robin Halpin, with the exception of two tracks. "Tender Love" was written by the production duo of Jimmy Jam and Terry Lewis. The album marked a shift in the group's sound, downplaying the rap songs in favor of more ballads. "Force MD's Meet the Fat Boys" is set to the theme song to Gilligan's Island.

== Critical reception ==
Professional ratings
Review scores
Source	Rating
AllMusic	4/5 stars
Robert Christgau	C+
The Encyclopedia of Popular Music	4/5 stars
The Rolling Stone Album Guide	2.5/5 stars

Trouser Press wrote: "From the ridiculous rap of 'Force M.D.’s Meet the Fat Boys' (partially sung to the melody of 'Gilligan’s Island' and guest-starring the tubby three) to the catchy, falsetto-over-scratch-beats title track, the versatile M.D.’s mix credible urban savvy with enough smooth showbiz to please hard beatboys and mature soul fans alike." The Washington Post thought that "the Force M.D.'s give their intoxicating harmonies the believable edge of impatient desires and streetwise arrangements."

The Los Angeles Times opined: "More comfortable with dreamy balladry than razor-edged rapping, the M.D.'s may not look as harmless as New Edition, but its love songs are equally sweet." The Seattle Times praised the group's "smooth, polished sound," and called "One Plus One" "a high-powered tune influenced by [the] Jackson Five."

AllMusic declared that the group "quietly reinvented quiet storm/R&B for the '80s with their doo wop-heavy 'Tender Love'."

== Track listing ==
No.	Title	Writer(s)	Length
1.	"One Plus One"	Antoine Lundy, Jessie D, Robin Halpin	4:07
2.	"Here I Go Again"	Antoine Lundy, Robin Halpin	6:24
3.	"Uh Oh!"	Robin Halpin, Trisco Pearson	4:28
4.	"Chillin'"	Antoine Lundy, Charles Nelson, Jessie D, Robin Halpin, Steven Lundy, Trisco Pearson	4:35
5.	"Force MD's Meet the Fat Boys"	George Wyle, Sherwood Schwartz, Wally Holmes	4:07
6.	"Tender Love"	James Harris III, Terry Lewis	3:54
7.	"Will You Be My Girlfriend?"	Antoine Lundy, Steven Lundy	4:25
8.	"Walking on Air"	Robin Halpin	4:17

== Personnel ==
Force MDs

- Jesse D (Jesse Daniels)
- Antoine "T.C.D." Lundy
- Stevie D (Steven Lundy)
- Charles "Mercury" Nelson
- Trisco Pearson

Musicians

- Robin Halpin – keyboards (1–4, 7, 8), synthesizers (1–4), arrangements (1–4, 7, 8), string arrangements (2)
- Vince Madison – keyboards (1–4, 7, 8), synthesizers (1–4, 7, 8), arrangements (4)
- John "M.J." Hickman – keyboards (5)
- Jimmy Jam – acoustic piano and keyboards [uncredited] (6)
- Paul Pesco – guitars (1, 3, 4, 7), drum programming (1, 3, 7), additional drum programming (8)
- Skip McDonald – guitars (2)
- Doug Wimbish – bass (2)
- Keith LeBlanc – drums (2)
- Eric Calvi – drum programming (3, 4, 8), arrangements (4)
- Bashiri Johnson – percussion (1, 3, 4, 7)
- The Fat Boys – vocals (5)

Production

- Tom Silverman – executive producer
- Force MDs – BGV arrangements (1–4, 6–8)
- Eric Calvi – engineer (1–4, 7, 8), editing (1, 3, 4, 6, 7), recording (5), mix engineer (5, 6), mixing (5), creative consultant
- Tom Lord-Alge – mix engineer (1–3, 7, 8)
- Robin Halpin – mixing (1–4, 7, 8), editing (1, 3, 4, 7), remixing (6), overdubs (6)
- Joey Gardner – mixing (5), remixing (6), editing (6)
- Bruce Miller – second engineer (2, 4)
- Jon Smith – editing (8)
- Herb Powers Jr. – mastering at Frankford/Wayne Mastering Labs (New York, NY)
- Monica Lynch – art direction
- Doug Rowell – photography
