= Force MDs =

American R&B vocal group

Force M.D.s

Background information
- Origin: Staten Island, New York City, U.S.
- Genres: R&B; urban; new jack swing; quiet storm
- Years active: 1981–present
- Labels: Tommy Boy; Reprise; Warner Bros.; Goldenlane
- Members: Zieme Capers; Stevie D. (Stevie D. Lundy); Khalil (Rodney Lundy)
- Past members: T.C.D. (Antoine Lundy) (deceased); Mercury (Charles Nelson) (deceased); DJ Dr. Rock (deceased); Shawn Waters; Trisco (Trisco Pearson) (deceased); Jessie D. (Jessie Lee Daniels) (deceased); Damen Heyward; Jessie Rannie
- Website: theforcemds.com

The Force M.D.s are an American R&B vocal group that was formed in 1981 in Staten Island, New York. Although the group has old school hip hop roots, it is perhaps best known for their soulful R&B tunes such as "Tender Love," "Love Is a House," "Tears," and "Here I Go Again." They are considered major forerunners of the new jack swing movement.

== History ==
=== Origins ===
The band was originally named The L.D.s, and then became the Force MCs. Though the group was not quite always as recognizable as other New York R&B acts when it first started, they were among the first R&B vocal groups to intermix doo-wop-affected singing with and sometimes over hip-hop beats.

The group was composed of brothers Stevie D., Antoine "T.C.D." (February 3, 1963 – January 18, 1998), and Rodney "Khalil" Lundy, and their uncle Jessie Lee Daniels (July 4, 1963 – January 4, 2022). Later, friends Trisco Pearson (October 23, 1962 – September 16, 2016) and Charles "Mercury" Nelson (December 19, 1964 – March 9, 1995) from the Mariners Harbor housing projects joined the group.

=== Performing and signing with a record label ===
The group began performing on Times Square, New York City street corners and during trips on the Staten Island ferry. After the L.D.s connected with DJ Dr. Rock (Roger Daniels) they then performed as "Dr. Rock & the Force MCs." The group was discovered by hip hop promoter Vansilk in summer 1981. The three members were Dr. Rock, Stevie D. and Mercury. In collaboration with Dr. Rock, the group continued to perfect their unique sound, which was unusual at the time: a fusion of doo-wop harmonies and hip-hop that involved singing, rapping and group member's "human beatbox" melodies at underground hip hop shows. They gained even more credibility and respect from local fans after competing in an emcee lyrical battle against the well known Cold Crush Brothers from the Bronx in 1983.

By 1984, the group signed with Tommy Boy Records. This is the same year the group changed their name to the Force MDs, which stood for “Musical Diversity”. They had developed into a quiet storm/contemporary R&B group, with its top-ten R&B hit, "Tears", from the debut album, Love Letters. (With the exception of their first album, the group was the first act on Tommy Boy to have major-label distribution through its then-parent Warner Bros. Records.)

=== Success ===
The group produced a collection of R&B hits throughout the 1980s, and received overwhelming commercial success from the Jimmy Jam and Terry Lewis-penned love song "Tender Love" from their second album, 1985's Chillin'. The song was featured in the 1985 feature film and soundtrack Krush Groove, and proved to be a success, peaking at No. 10 in the Billboard Hot 100 chart, becoming an instant R&B classic after it stayed on the chart for 19 weeks. "Tender Love" was also one of the tracks that helped Jam & Lewis garner a Grammy Award for Producer of the Year. The song "Itchin' for a Scratch" was performed by the group in the 1985 feature film Rappin', and was also part of the soundtrack.

In 1987 they scored their first R&B number one hit, "Love Is a House," from their third album, Touch and Go.

=== Waning popularity and member changes ===
By the late 1980s the group's popularity began to wane. A fourth album, Step to Me, was released in 1990, which featured record production by Full Force, Marley Marl, Monte Moir (of the band The Time), and others. Members Pearson and Nelson left soon afterward, replaced by original member Rodney "Khalil" Lundy (who had initially left the band early in their career) and new member Shawn Waters. The group then released the album Moments in Time in 1994, but failed to chart or produce any hits. In 1996 the group appeared on several tracks on the Ghostface Killah album Ironman.

=== Deaths in the group and a last reunion ===
Three of the group's members died during the latter half of the 1990s: Nelson suffered a fatal heart attack in 1995; former collaborator DJ Dr. Rock died suddenly of AIDS in 1996; and in 1998, Antoine Lundy died of Lou Gehrig's disease.

Surviving members of the group's classic lineup - Daniels, Pearson, and Stevie D. Lundy - along with Rodney Lundy returned with a comeback album, The Reunion, in 2000, but it failed to chart or register any hits. Damen Heyward, a native of The Bronx and formerly of the mid-/late-1980s group 4 By Four, later joined the group. After leaving the group, Heyward went on to tour with artists such as Joe.

Trisco Pearson died on September 16, 2016, at age 53, after a battle with stage 4 cancer. His death was announced by Bow Legged Lou of Full Force. Jessie Daniels died on January 4, 2022, at the age of 58.

== Legacy ==
Rapper Doug E. Fresh said of the group, "Any group that has merged hip-hop and R&B are the children of the Force M.D.s." The group was listed in the 1986 World Book Encyclopedia as originators of "Do Wop Hip Hop."

- On September 9, 2015, they were featured on an episode of TV One's Unsung.
- The members of Force MD's were referenced in the song "Okkervil River R.I.P." by indie-folk band Okkervil River on their 2016 album Away.

== Members ==
- Zieme Capers
- Stevie D. (Stevie D. Lundy)
- Khalil (Rodney Lundy)

=== Former members ===
- Shawn Waters
- Damen Heyward
- Mercury (Charles Nelson) December 19, 1964-March 9, 1995 (aged 30)
- DJ Dr. Rock September 12, 1962-August 13, 1996 (aged 33)
- T.C.D. (Antoine Lundy) February 3, 1963-January 18, 1998 (aged 34)
- Trisco (Trisco Pearson) October 23, 1962-September 16, 2016 (aged 53)
- Jessie D. (Jessie Lee Daniels) July 4, 1963-January 4, 2022 (aged 58)

== Discography ==
=== Studio albums ===
Year	Album details	Peak chart positions		
Year	Album details	US	US R&B	CAN
1984	Love Letters: Released: September 14, 1984; Label: Tommy Boy; Formats: LP, cassette	185	28	—
1985	Chillin': Released: December 15, 1985; Label: Tommy Boy/Warner Bros.; Formats: CD, LP, cassette	69	14	80
1987	Touch and Go: Released: June 11, 1987; Label: Tommy Boy/Warner Bros.; Formats: CD, LP, cassette	67	12	—
1990	Step to Me: Released: September 4, 1990; Label: Tommy Boy/Reprise/Warner Bros.; Formats: CD, LP, cassette	—	74	—
1994	Moments in Time: Released: November 8, 1994; Label: Nuwr; Formats: CD, cassette	—	—	—
2000	The Reunion: Released: September 19, 2000; Label: Mad Love; Formats: CD, cassette	—	—	—

=== Compilation albums ===
Year	Album details
1992	For Lovers and Others: Force M.D.'s Greatest Hits: Released: February 18, 1992; Label: Tommy Boy
2001	Let Me Love You: The Greatest Hits: Released: March 20, 2001; Label: Tommy Boy

=== Singles ===
Year	Single	Peak chart positions					Album
Year	Single	US	US R&B	US A/C	CAN	UK	Album
1984	"Let Me Love You"	—	49	—	—	—	Love Letters
1984	"Tears"	102	5	—	—	—	Love Letters
1985	"Forgive Me Girl"	—	49	—	—	93	Love Letters
1985	"Itchin' for a Scratch"	105	13	—	—	—	Love Letters
1985	"Tender Love"	10	4	2	9	23	Chillin'
1986	"Here I Go Again"	—	18	—	—	98	Chillin'
1986	"One Plus One"	—	29	—	—	—	Chillin'
1986	"I Wanna Know Your Name"	—	21	—	—	—	Non-album single
1987	"Love Is a House"	78	1	38	—	97	Touch and Go
1987	"Touch and Go"	—	10	—	—	—	Touch and Go
1988	"Couldn't Care Less"	—	23	—	—	—	Touch and Go
1988	"Deep Check"	—	66	—	—	—	Non-album single
1989	"Float On" (with Stetsasonic)	—	56	—	—	—	In Full Gear
1990	"Are You Really Real?	—	23	—	—	—	Step to Me
1990	"Somebody's Crying"	—	34	—	—	—	Step to Me
1992	"Your Love Drives Me Crazy"	—	78	—	—	—	Touch and Go
"—" denotes the single failed to chart or was not released

== Filmography ==
- 1985: Rappin'
- 1989: Limit Up

== Cover versions ==
One of its songs, “Tender Love,” was covered by Jordan Knight, Kenny Thomas, Usher, Uncle Sam, Alicia Keys, and Meshell Ndegeocello.
