= Octopussy (soundtrack) =

Soundtrack album by John Barry
- Released: 1983
- Label: A&M

Singles from Octopussy
- 1. "All Time High" Released: June 1983

Octopussy is the 1983 soundtrack for the eponymous thirteenth James Bond film. The score was composed by John Barry, the lyrics by Tim Rice. The opening theme, "All Time High," is sung by Rita Coolidge and is one of six Bond film title songs or songs that are not named after film's title.

The original compact disc released in 1985, by A&M Records, was recalled because of a printing error, and became a rarity. In 1997, the soundtrack was released, by Rykodisc, with the original soundtrack music and some film dialogue, (additional tracks, "Miss Penelope", "Introducing Mr. Bond" and "Poison Pen") on an Enhanced CD version. The 2003 release, by EMI, restored the original soundtrack music sans dialogue. In 2023 La La Land Records release a 2 disc expanded edition of the score.

The original music video of "All Time High" shows Rita Coolidge in very soft focus in what appears to be an Indian palace, but which is actually one of the film's locations, the Royal Pavilion in Brighton, England.

In November 2023, La La Land Records released a limited expanded edition containing previously unreleased music.

== Track listing ==
=== Original Release/2003 Remastered Version ===
1. "All Time High" – Rita Coolidge
2. "Bond Look-Alike"
3. "009 Gets the Knife and Gobinda Attacks"
4. "That's My Little Octopussy"
5. "Arrival at the Island of Octopussy"
6. "Bond at the Monsoon Palace"
7. "Bond Meets Octopussy"
8. "Yo-Yo Fight and Death of Vijay"
9. "The Chase Bomb Theme"
10. "The Palace Fight"
11. "All Time High (Movie Version)" – Rita Coolidge

=== 1997 release ===
1. "All Time High" – Rita Coolidge
2. "Bond Look-Alike"
3. "Miss Penelope"—dialogue
4. "009 Gets the Knife and Gobinda Attacks"
5. "That's My Little Octopussy"
6. "Arrival at the Island of Octopussy"
7. "Introducing Mr. Bond"—dialogue
8. "Bond at the Monsoon Palace"
9. "Bond Meets Octopussy"
10. "Poison Pen"—dialogue
11. "Yo-Yo Fight and Death of Vijay"
12. "The Chase Bomb Theme"
13. "The Palace Fight"
14. "All Time High" – Rita Coolidge

=== 2023 release ===
==== Disc 1 ====
1. "Gun Barrel And Airbase" (0:51) (Contains The James Bond Theme)
2. "Bond Look-Alike" (2:59) (Contains The James Bond Theme)
3. "Fill Her Up" (0:44)
4. "All Time High" (Performed by Rita Coolidge) (3:05)
5. "009 Gets the Knife and the Property of a Lady" (1:35)
6. "Kremlin Art Repository and Sotheby’s" (1:22) (Contains The James Bond Theme)
7. "India" (1:00) (Contains The James Bond Theme)
8. "Magda and Spend the Money Quickly, Mr. Bond" (0:50)
9. "Gobinda Attacks" (2:14) (Contains The James Bond Theme)
10. "Easy Come, Easy Go" (1:50) (Contains The James Bond Theme)
11. "All Time High (Instrumental)" (1:48)
12. "That’s My Little Octopussy" (3:13)
13. "Arrival at the Island of Octopussy" (3:23)
14. "Bond at the Monsoon Palace" (3:04)
15. "Palace Intrigue" (1:43)
16. "The Mysterious Octopussy" (2:36)
17. "Bond Meets Octopussy" (3:36) (Contains The James Bond Theme)
18. "Yo-Yo Fight and Death of Vijay (Extended Version)" (3:54) (Contains The James Bond Theme)
19. "Checkpoint Charlie and the Romanov Star" (1:06) (Contains The James Bond Theme)
20. "The Chase Bomb Theme (Film Version)" (1:55)
21. "Fight with Mischka" (0:56)
22. "Follow That Car" (1:02) (Contains The James Bond Theme)
23. "The End of General Orlov" (1:51)
24. "Gorilla Suit and Death of Grischka" (1:26)
25. "The Bomb Arrives and Clowning Around" (1:48)
26. "The Palace Fight (Extended Version)" (5:00) (Contains The James Bond Theme)
27. "Kamal Khan’s Death and Finale" (2:01)
28. "All Time High – End Title (Performed by Rita Coolidge)" (3:03)
29. "British Ambassador" (0:48)
30. "Vijay’s Pungi" (0:32) (Contains The James Bond Theme)
31. "Gangaur Ghat" (1:20)
32. "Bazaar" (1:09)
33. "Let the Sport Commence" (2:59)
34. "The Hunt Continues" (2:10)
35. "The Floating Palace" (0:53)
36. "Distraction" (2:07)

==== Disc 2 ====
1. "All Time High (Performed by Rita Coolidge)" (3:04)
2. "Bond Look-Alike" (2:59) (Contains The James Bond Theme)
3. "009 Gets the Knife and Gobinda Attacks" (3:06) (Contains The James Bond Theme)
4. "That’s My Little Octopussy" (3:13)
5. "Arrival at the Island of Octopussy" (3:23)
6. "Bond at the Monsoon Palace" (3:04)
7. "Bond Meets Octopussy" (3:36) (Contains The James Bond Theme)
8. "Yo-Yo Fight and Death of Vijay" (3:45) (Contains The James Bond Theme)
9. "The Chase Bomb Theme" (1:57)
10. "The Palace Fight" (4:32) (Contains The James Bond Theme)
11. "All Time High – End Title" (Performed by Rita Coolidge) (3:03)
12. "All Time High" (Extended Instrumental Version) (3:52)

== See also ==
- Outline of James Bond
