= Walela =

American musical trio

Walela is a trio of singers, named for the Cherokee word for hummingbird. The group was founded in 1996 by sisters Rita Coolidge and Priscilla Coolidge, with Priscilla's daughter Laura Satterfield as the third member.

== Biography ==
Featured as part of Robbie Robertson and the Red Road Ensemble's album Music for The Native Americans, Walela is known for their distinctive vocal blend. During the 1996 Atlanta Olympics, Walela performed extensively in the Olympic Park. Their 1997 debut release on Capitol Records earned them the recognition of the Nammy Awards (Native American Music Awards) where they took home the award for Debut Artist of the Year and Song of the Year for "The Warrior".

During the 2010s, there was controversy at the Native American Music Awards due to allegations that none of Walela's members were Native American. The Native American Music Awards allows any person who self-identifies as Native American to receive awards without any verification of tribal citizenship. The Coolidge family is not enrolled in any Native American tribe. Rita Coolidge has said that their great-aunt was on the Trail of Tears and that she "did a lot of research", but that "we were not able to get the documents to prove that our ancestors were on the Trail" and could not find any ancestors listed on "the official government roll".

== Awards ==
The group won the Native American Music Awards' best debut group and song of the year for 1998.

== Discography ==
=== Walela (1997) ===
1. Is Everybody Here
2. Cherokee River
3. Wash Your Spirit Clean
4. The Warrior
5. Muddy Road
6. Cherokee
7. Cherokee Morning Song
8. Wounded Knee
9. The Whippoorwill
10. Circle of Light
11. Earth Children
12. Amazing Grace (in Cherokee)
13. I'll Turn My Radio On

=== Unbearable Love (2000) ===
1. Gathering of Eagles
2. The Sequence
3. Cherokee Rose
4. I Know I Don't Walk on Water
5. Smoke in the Wind
6. Bright Morning Star
7. I Have No Indian Name
8. Tell Them They Lie
9. When It Comes
10. When Love Was All We Knew
11. God Save Us from Ourselves
12. Unbearable Love

=== Live in Concert (2004) ===
1. The Gathering of Eagles
2. Cherokee River
3. Cherokee Rose
4. Wash Your Spirit Clean
5. I Have No Indian Name
6. When It Comes
7. Muddy Road
8. When Love Was All We Knew
9. Cherokee Morning Song
10. Wounded Knee
11. Tell Them They Lied
12. God Save Us From Ourselves

=== The Best of Walela (2007) ===
1. Is Everybody Here
2. Cherokee Morning Star
3. Amazing Grace
4. Bright Morning Star
5. Smoke In the Wind
6. Wash Your Spirit Clean
7. The Warrior
8. Cherokee Rose
9. I'll Turn My Radio On
10. I Have No Indian Name
11. God Save Us From Ourselves
12. When It Comes
13. The Whippoorwill
14. Unbearable Love
