= Dancing with an Angel =

Studio album by Rita Coolidge
- Released: July 21, 1991
- Recorded: 1991
- Studios: Studio Ultimo and Studio 56 (Los Angeles, California): Groove Masters (Santa Monica, California)
- Genres: Pop; standards
- Length: 58:07
- Label: Attic
- Producers: Ichizo Seo; Mike Utley

Rita Coolidge chronology
| Fire Me Back (1990) | Dancing with an Angel (1991) | Love Lessons (1992) |

Dancing with an Angel is a studio album by American singer-songwriter Rita Coolidge. Released on July 21, 1991, by Attic Records in Canada and Japan, it consists mainly of English-language covers of popular J-pop songs. Coolidge's cover of "Love Story wa Totsuzen ni", titled "Suddenly", was covered by Debbie Gibson on her 2010 cover album Ms. Vocalist.

The album peaked at No. 16 on Oricon's albums chart.

== Track listing ==
All English lyrics are written by Priscilla Coolidge, except track 4.

| No. | Title | Writer(s) | Original artist | Length |
|---|---|---|---|---|
| 1. | "I Just Want to Be with You" (Saisho no Namida, Saigo no Kisu (最初の涙、最後の口吻; "First Tears, Last Kiss")) | Yoshiyuki Ohsawa | Yoshiyuki Ohsawa | 4:27 |
| 2. | "Rain" (Ame (雨)) | Chisato Moritaka; Seiji Matsuura | Chisato Moritaka | 4:59 |
| 3. | "End of the Summer" (Garēji (ガレージ; "Garage")) | Gorō Matsui; Yukihide Takekawa | Masanori Ikeda | 4:33 |
| 4. | "Endless Nights" | Randy Goodrum; Kazumasa Oda | Off Course | 4:16 |
| 5. | "Another Saturday ~Let It Be Me~" (Mōhitotsu no Doyōbi (もうひとつの土曜日)) | Shōgo Hamada | Shōgo Hamada | 5:51 |
| 6. | "Samarkand Blue" (Samarukando Burū (サマルカンド・ブルー)) | Kazumi Yasui; Takuro Yoshida | Takuro Yoshida | 4:57 |
| 7. | "River of Love" | Priscilla Coolidge; Rita Coolidge | | 3:53 |
| 8. | "Sol y Sombra" | Yūho Iwasato; Toshiaki Matsumoto | Miki Imai | 5:44 |
| 9. | "Rainy Blue" | Makoto Ōki; Hideaki Tokunaga | Hideaki Tokunaga | 4:27 |
| 10. | "Please Don't You Cry" | Megumi Shiina; Nobody | Megumi Shiina | 4:51 |
| 11. | "Suddenly" (Rabu Sutōrī wa Totsuzen ni (ラブ・ストーリーは突然に; "Sudden Love Story")) | Oda | Kazumasa Oda | 4:50 |
| 12. | "Circle of Light" | Priscilla Coolidge; Rita Coolidge | | 5:12 |
| Total length: | | | | 58:07 |

== Personnel ==
- Rita Coolidge – vocals
- Michael Utley – acoustic piano, keyboards, Hammond B3 organ
- Tom Keane – synthesizers
- Dean Parks – electric lead guitar
- Fred Tackett – electric lead guitar, rhythm guitar, acoustic guitar, nylon guitar, slide guitar
- Bill Sharpe – bass
- Thom Mooney – drums
- John Robinson – drums
- Michael Fisher – percussion
- Brandon Fields – alto saxophone, soprano saxophone
- Rosemary Butler – backing vocals
- Priscilla Coolidge – backing vocals
- Jo Ann Harris – backing vocals
- David Lasley – backing vocals
- Arnold McCuller – backing vocals
- Luther Waters – backing vocals
- Fred White – backing vocals

=== Production ===
- Ichizo Seo – producer, arrangements
- Michael Utley – producer, arrangements
- John Bavin – recording, engineer
- Jay Rifkin – mixing
- Tom Biener – assistant engineer
- Paul Dieter – assistant engineer
- Peggy McAffee – assistant engineer
- Tim Nitz – assistant engineer
- Tom Baker – mastering at Future Disc (Hollywood, California)
- Tomoko Takaya – production coordinator
- Shun Suzuki – production coordinator
- Kevin Gorman – production coordinator
- Holly Horigrami – production coordinator
- William Hames – photography
- Ruri Fujita – design

== Charts ==
| Chart (1991) | Peak position |
|---|---|
| Japanese Albums (Oricon) | 16 |
