= Kenny Thomas (singer) =

English soul singer (born 1968)

- Born: Kenny Thomas; 12 September 1968 (age 58); Islington, London, England
- Genres: Soul, blue-eyed soul, R&B
- Occupation: Singer
- Instrument: Vocals
- Years active: 1988–present
- Label: Cooltempo
- Formerly of: Living in a Box

Kenny Thomas (born 12 September 1968, Islington, London) is an English soul singer who had a successful solo career in the 1990s with eight UK top 40 singles and two UK top ten albums.

== Personal life ==
Thomas grew up on Hillside Estate, Stamford Hill and attended Cardinal Pole Roman Catholic School in Hackney. He was an amateur boxer and worked for British Telecom before embarking on a career as a professional singer. He now lives in Norfolk.

== Career ==
=== Breakthrough and debut album ===
Thomas's breakthrough came in 1991 with his debut hit "Outstanding", a cover of the Gap Band song, which went to number 12 on the UK Singles Chart.

He succeeded in having three singles in the UK chart that year including his biggest hit in July, "Thinking About Your Love", which peaked at number four and stayed on the chart for 13 weeks, and "Best of You", which peaked at number 11 and was in the chart for seven weeks. The former hit was produced by Tim Lever and Mike Percy, formerly of the band Dead or Alive. Thomas's debut album Voices (1991) reached number three on the UK Albums Chart, selling over 300,000 copies. His debut album also includes his revival of Force MD's song "Tender Love".

In February 1992 at the annual BRIT Awards, Thomas was nominated for an award in two categories, Best British Male Vocalist and Best British Newcomer.

=== Second album and further singles ===
His second album Wait for Me, released in 1993, was produced by Ian Green and included contributions from Nu Colours and the Young Disciples, and made number 10 in the UK Albums Chart. The lead single from the album, "Trippin' on Your Love", originally recorded by the Staple Singers, made number 17 in the UK Singles Chart.

=== Later career ===
Thomas's career enjoyed a brief revival in 2005, when he took part in the televised singing contest on ITV's Hit Me Baby One More Time. He was joined by other one time big pop stars including Shakin' Stevens and Shalamar; the show was eventually won by Stevens.

Thomas supported Level 42 on their Autumn 2006 tour of the UK. July 2006 also saw the release of a new studio album called Crazy World. In 2010, Thomas completed three years of study graduating with a Bachelor of Science degree in Acupuncture & Oriental Medicine and is now a qualified practitioner. He released a new album, Breathe, in September 2011. Producers on the album include the UK-based Mark Jaimes & Danny Saxon, 5AM, Sir Piers and the Drizabone Soul Family.

Thomas's album and project in 2013 The Thomas Brown Affair, was a collaboration with hit songwriter, producer and jazz pianist Wayne Brown who has worked with a diverse array of international artists. The album is a collection of classic songs "performed in their own personal and unique style".

In 2016, Thomas became the lead singer of the band Living in a Box after they reformed, replacing Richard Darbyshire.

Thomas released his latest album Unstoppable in 2025, produced by Opolopo and featuring the single Shout Out featuring Kim Wilde. The release of Unstoppable will be followed by The Unstoppable Tour: The Very Best of Kenny Thomas in 2026, marking the 35th anniversary of his debut album Voices.

== Discography ==
=== Albums ===
Year	Album details	UK	AUS	Certifications
1991	Voices: Label: Cooltempo, Chrysalis; Formats: LP, CD, cassette	3	133	BPI: Platinum
1993	Wait for Me: Released: 13 September 1993; Label: Cooltempo, Chrysalis; Formats: LP, CD, cassette	10	—	BPI: Gold
1999	The Best: Label: EMI Gold; Formats: CD	—	—	
2001	Greatest Hits: Released: 8 January 2001; Formats: CD	—	—	
2006	Crazy World: Released: 10 July 2006; Label: Curb Records; Formats: CD	—	—	
2011	Breathe: Label: Solus; Formats: CD, digital download	—	—	
2023	The Best of: Label: Chrysalis Records; Formats: CD, digital download	—	—	
2024	Remixed:The Best of: Label: Chrysalis Records; Formats: CD, digital download	—	—	
2024	HIM: Label: Chrysalis Records; Formats: CD, digital download	—	—	
2025	Unstoppable: Label: 777 Records/Kartel; Formats: CD, digital download	—	—	
"—" denotes releases that did not chart or were not released.

=== Singles ===
Year	Single	Peak chart positions								Album
Year	Single	UK	AUS	IRE	NED	FRA	GER	SWE	NZ	Album
1988	"I Wanna Make Love to You Baby"	—	—	—	—	—	—	—	—	Non-album single
1990	"Outstanding"	79	—	—	—	—	—	—	—	Voices
1991	"Outstanding" (reissue)	12	—	—	—	—	—	—	7	Voices
1991	"Thinking About Your Love"	4	125	—	—	—	50	22	—	Voices
1991	"Best of You"	11	197	27	87	23	66	—	31	Voices
1991	"Tender Love"	26	—	—	—	—	—	—	—	Voices
1993	"Stay"	22	—	—	—	—	—	—	—	Wait for Me
1993	"Trippin' on Your Love"	17	—	—	—	—	100	—	—	Wait for Me
1993	"Piece by Piece"	36	—	—	—	—	—	—	—	Wait for Me
1994	"Destiny"	59	—	—	—	—	—	—	—	Wait for Me
1995	"When I Think of You"	27	—	—	—	—	—	—	—	HIM
2006	"Crazy World"	—	—	—	—	—	—	—	—	Crazy World
2011	"The Show Is Over"	—	—	—	—	—	—	—	—	Breathe
2025	"Shout Out" (with Kim Wilde)	—	—	—	—	—	—	—	—	Unstoppable
"—" denotes releases that did not chart or were not released.
