= Never Let You Go (album) =

Studio album by Rita Coolidge
- Released: October 1983
- Recorded: June – September 1982
- Studio: Soundcastle Recording Studios and The Village Recorder (Los Angeles, California): Ocean Way Recording (Hollywood, California)
- Genre: Pop
- Label: A&M
- Producer: David Anderle; *co-produced with Bernie Worrell

Rita Coolidge chronology
Heartbreak Radio (1981)	Never Let You Go (1983)	Inside the Fire (1984)

Never Let You Go is a 1983 album by Rita Coolidge and was released on the A&M Records label. The album originally did not contain the song "All Time High" from the movie Octopussy. After the success of the song, it was added to later pressings and included on the album.

== Track listing ==
=== Side one ===
1. "I'll Never Let You Go" (James House, Wendy Waldman) – 4:18
2. "Tempted"* (Glenn Tilbrook, Chris Difford) – 3:45
3. "Stop Wasting Your Time"* (Ian Dury, Chas Jankel) – 4:12
4. "Shadow in the Night"* (Jimbeau Hinson, Tony Brown) – 3:35
5. "Only You" (Vince Clark) – 3:15

=== Side two ===
1. "You Do It" (Deborah Allen, Eddie Struzick, Rafe Van Hoy) – 3:19
2. "Fools in Love"* (Joe Jackson) – 3:44
3. "Do You Really Want to Hurt Me" (M. Craig, R. Hay, J. Moss, G. O'Dowd) – 4:00
4. "You Ought to Be with Me"* (Al Green, Willie Mitchell, Al Jackson) – 3:15
5. "We've Got Tonite"* (Duet with Jermaine Jackson) (Bob Seger) – 4:38

== Personnel ==
- Rita Coolidge – vocals
- Michael Utley – keyboards (1, 5, 8), synthesizers (1, 8), string arrangements (5, 6, 8), organ (6)
- Bernie Worrell – organ (2), synthesizers (2–4, 9), keyboards (3, 4, 9, 10), acoustic piano (7)
- Mike Lewis – keyboards (3, 4), synthesizers (3, 4), trumpet arrangements (3), cello arrangements (4), string arrangements (10)
- Rick Vito – guitars (1, 5, 6, 8), guitar solo (1)
- Eric Williams – guitars, mandolin (5)
- Kurtis Teel – bass (1, 2, 5, 6, 8, 10)
- Kerry Hatch – bass (4, 7, 9)
- Thom Mooney – drums
- Victor Feldman – tambourine (1), percussion (5), vibraphone (8)
- Mark Singer – tambourine (4)
- Harry Kim – trumpet (3)
- Steve Allen – saxophone (4)
- Jules Chaikin – concertmaster (5, 6, 8)
- William Henderson – concertmaster (10)
- Tamara Champlin – backing vocals (2)
- Carmen Grillo – backing vocals (2)
- David Lasley – backing vocals (2, 4, 5, 7)
- Jermaine Jackson – backing vocals (4), vocals (10)
- Arnold McCuller – backing vocals (5, 7)
- Bonnie Bramlett – backing vocals (6, 9)
- Jo Ann Harris – backing vocals (6–9)
- Judy Brown – backing vocals (8)

=== Production ===
- David Anderle – producer
- Bernie Worrell – co-producer (2–4, 7, 9, 10)
- Joe Chiccharelli – recording, mixing
- Mitch Gibson – assistant engineer
- Robin Laine – assistant engineer
- David Marquette – assistant engineer
- Ellen Vogt – production assistant
- Jeff Ayeroff – art direction
- Chuck Beeson – art direction, album design
- Moshe Brakha – photography
- Bert Block and Ron Rainey – management

== Charts ==
Chart (1983)	Position
Japan Albums (Oricon)	15
