= Thinking About Your Love (Kenny Thomas song) =

1991 single by Kenny Thomas

Single by Kenny Thomas

from the album Voices
- Released: 20 May 1991
- Length: 3:55
- Label: Cooltempo
- Songwriters: Michael Ward; Shaun Ward; Jim Williams
- Producers: Mike Percy; Tim Lever

Kenny Thomas singles chronology
"Outstanding" (1990)	"Thinking About Your Love" (1991)	"Best of You" (1991)

"Thinking About Your Love" is a song by British soul singer Kenny Thomas from his debut album, Voices (1991). It is written by Michael Ward, Shaun Ward and Jim Williams, and produced by former Dead or Alive members Mike Percy and Tim Lever. The song was released as a single in May 1991 by Cooltempo Records and became Thomas' highest-charting hit in the United Kingdom, peaking at number four on the UK Singles Chart. In Sweden, the song peaked at number 22 and was his only single that charted there.

== Critical reception ==
James Hamilton from Record Mirror wrote, "Released next week, almost a year after 'Outstanding' was first promoed, Kenny's even classier follow-up is a superb slinkily jiggling soul jogger with attractively harmonised hooks and a sophisticated arrangement, produced by 1 World's Mike Percy & Tim Lever [...]. Let's hope it's not too good!"

== Charts ==
=== Weekly charts ===
Chart (1991)	Peak position
Australia (ARIA)	125
Europe (Eurochart Hot 100)	12
Europe (European Hit Radio)	12
Germany (GfK)	50
Luxembourg (Radio Luxembourg)	5
Sweden (Sverigetopplistan)	22
UK Singles (Official Charts)	4
UK Airplay (Music Week)	4
UK Dance (Music Week)	3
UK Club Chart (Record Mirror)	3

=== Year-end charts ===
Chart (1991)	Position
Europe (European Hit Radio)	72
UK Singles (OCC)	33
UK Club Chart (Record Mirror)	26

== Release history ==
Region	Date	Format(s)	Label(s)	Ref.
United Kingdom	20 May 1991	7-inch vinyl; 12-inch vinyl; CD; cassette	Cooltempo	
Australia	23 March 1992	CD; cassette	Cooltempo	
