= Satisfied (Rita Coolidge album) =

Studio album by Rita Coolidge
- Released: September 1979
- Recorded: Sunset Sound Studios
- Genre: Pop
- Length: 39:19
- Label: A&M
- Producers: David Anderle; Booker T. Jones

Rita Coolidge chronology
Natural Act (1978)	Satisfied (1979)	Greatest Hits (1980)

Satisfied is a 1979 album by Rita Coolidge, released on A&M Records. The album is notable for containing Coolidge's comeback single, "I'd Rather Leave While I'm in Love", as well as for its perceived unique musical direction at the time of its release.

== History ==
The album contains Coolidge's comeback single, "I'd Rather Leave While I'm in Love", as well as Coolidge's version of The Chiffons' "One Fine Day", which was also released as a single. The album has been described as comparable in significance to Dusty Springfield's Dusty in Memphis album, released ten years earlier.

== Track listing ==
=== Side one ===
1. "One Fine Day" (Gerry Goffin, Carole King) – 4:00
2. "The Fool in Me" (Dave Loggins, Randy Goodrum) – 4:21
3. "Trust It All to Somebody" (Donna Weiss, Lenny Macaluso) – 4:11
4. "Let's Go Dancin'" (Booker T. Jones) – 5:19

=== Side two ===
1. "Pain of Love" (Johnny Bristol) – 4:00
2. "I'd Rather Leave While I'm in Love" (Carole Bayer Sager, Peter Allen) – 3:29
3. "Sweet Emotion" (Priscilla Jones) – 4:08
4. "Crime of Passion" (Mary Unobsky, Danny Ironstone) – 4:57
5. "Can She Keep You Satisfied" (Rita Coolidge, Priscilla Jones) – 4:46

== Personnel ==
- Rita Coolidge – vocals
- Booker T. Jones – keyboards, horns (8), backing vocals, arrangements, string arrangements
- Michael Utley – keyboards, arrangements
- Stephen Bruton, Dean Parks, Fred Tackett – guitars
- Dennis Belfield, Bob Glaub, Tommy McClure – bass guitar
- Sammy Creason, Jim Keltner – drums
- Richie Cannata – horns (1–7, 9), horn arrangements
- Dorothy Ashby – harp
- Jules Chaikin – string conductor
- Priscilla Coolidge – backing vocals
- Donny Gerrard – backing vocals
- Michael McDonald – backing vocals
- John Seiter – backing vocals

=== Production ===
- David Anderle – producer, mixing
- Booker T. Jones – producer
- Ron Hitchcock – recording
- Peggy McCreary – recording, mixing
- Mike Reese – mastering at The Mastering Lab (Hollywood, California)
- Ellen Vogt – production assistant
- Roland Young – art direction
- Chuck Beeson – album design
- Francesco Scavullo – photography
- Bert Block – management

== Charts ==
Chart (1979)	Peak position
Australia (Kent Music Report)	59
US Billboard 200	95
