= Antoine "T.C.D." Lundy =

American singer-songwriter

- Antoine Lundy, bottom left

Background information
- Birth name: Antoine Maurice Lundy
- Born: February 3, 1963; Harlem, New York
- Origin: Staten Island, New York
- Died: January 18, 1998 (aged 34); East Stroudsburg, Pennsylvania
- Genres: Soul, new jack swing
- Occupation(s): Singer, songwriter
- Years active: 1984–1998
- Labels: Tommy Boy/Reprise/Warner Bros. Records
- Formerly of: Force MDs

Antoine "T.C.D." Lundy (February 3, 1963 – January 18, 1998) was an American singer who was a member of the contemporary R&B group Force MDs, whose other members included his brother Stevie D, their uncle Jesse Lee Daniels, and friends Trisco Pearson and Charles "Mercury" Nelson. The group had a string of R&B hits through the 1980s, scoring a top-ten pop hit was the slow jam "Tender Love," which was featured in the 1985 film Krush Groove. The group also appeared in the hip hop-inspired motion picture Rappin' (1985). 1987 produced the group's first R&B #1, "Love is a House".

Lundy died of Lou Gehrig's disease in 1998, after having endured the condition for two years. In addition to his parents and siblings, Lundy was survived by his wife, Denise, along with eight children.

== Discography ==
- Love Letters (1984)
- Chillin' (1985)
- Touch & Go (1987)
- Step to Me (1990)
- Moments in Time

== Filmography ==
- 1985: Rappin'
- 1989: Limit Up
