= Natural Act =

Studio album by Kris Kristofferson and Rita Coolidge
- Released: December 1978
- Recorded: Sunset Sound, Los Angeles
- Genre: Country
- Length: 36:41
- Label: A&M
- Producer: David Anderle

Kris Kristofferson chronology
Easter Island (1978)	Natural Act (1978)	Shake Hands with the Devil (1979)

Rita Coolidge chronology
Love Me Again (1978)	Natural Act (1978)	Satisfied (1979)

Professional ratings
Review scores
Source	Rating
AllMusic	2.5/5 stars
The Village Voice	B

Natural Act is the third and final duet album by Kris Kristofferson and Rita Coolidge, released in 1978 on A&M Records. The couple would divorce the following year. The album was released while Coolidge's career was at a peak; her recent albums Anytime...Anywhere and Love Me Again had seen much commercial success. Natural Act is Kristofferson's only album to chart in the United Kingdom.

== Background ==
When the couple recorded their first duet album Full Moon in 1973, Kristofferson was the bigger recording star, having won several awards for his songwriting and scoring a massive hit with “Why Me” from his gold selling LP Jesus Was a Capricorn, while Coolidge was still developing as an artist. By 1978, however, Coolidge hit number 6 on the Billboard 100 with the platinum selling Anytime…Anywhere, an album that spawned three Top 20 hits. Although he was now an established film star, Kristofferson’s previous album, Easter Island, was a commercial disappointment.

The couple’s marriage was floundering by this time. In the A&E episode of Biography about his life, Kristofferson admits to having a steamy love affair with co-star Sarah Miles on the set of 1976's The Sailor Who Fell from Grace with the Sea. Natural Act would be their final studio album together.

== Recording and composition ==
Natural Act was recorded at Sunset Sound and was produced by David Anderle, who had produced their first duet album and several solo albums since. Musically, the album leaned more to pop than rock and featured relaxed southern boogie, nostalgic pop ballads and country-tinged numbers alongside more unusual choices such as a reworking of "I Fought the Law," a hit for The Bobby Fuller Four in 1966, which found them sounding like The Everly Brothers.

With the couple's marriage disintegrating, several cuts carry a wistful poignancy, such as "Love Don’t Live Here Anymore" and the two older Kristofferson compositions, "Please Don’t Tell Me How the Story Ends", which had been a hit for Ray Price, and the regretful "Loving You Was Easier (Than Anything I'll Ever Do Again)", which Willie Nelson covered the following year on his Sings Kristofferson LP. The dour tone of these songs was reflected on the album cover; photographed by Annie Leibovitz, gone were the carefree unkempt lovers pictured on the first two album sleeves, and in their place were two separate individuals wearing smart clothes and strained faces.

== Reception ==
Natural Act was not a commercial success, failing to crack the Billboard 100 or the country Top 20.

AllMusic wrote, "...unlike the first two albums, Kristofferson didn't seem to be making much of an effort as a vocalist, while Coolidge just seemed listless. Natural Act sounded like a contractual obligation record from a musical act that had lost the chemistry that fueled it early on, just as the marriage apparently had." Kristofferson biographer Stephen Miller is more positive, calling the songs "reasonably strong” and adding that the collection "could hold its own against much of the lighter pop material in the charts in the late Seventies."

== Track listing ==
1. "Blue as I Do" (Stephen Bruton) – 2:53
2. "Not Everyone Knows" (Robert "Rob Dog" Morrison, Billy Swan) – 3:08
3. "I Fought the Law" (Sonny Curtis) – 2:27
4. "Number One" (Sonny Curtis, Billy Swan) – 2:35
5. "You're Gonna Love Yourself (In the Morning)" (Donnie Fritts) – 2:54
6. "Loving You Was Easier (Than Anything I'll Ever Do Again)" (Kristofferson) – 4:09
7. "Back in My Baby's Arms" (T Bone Burnett) – 2:59
8. "Please Don't Tell Me How the Story Ends" (Kristofferson) – 2:23
9. "Hoola Hoop" (T Bone Burnett, John Fleming, Roscoe West) – 3:51
10. "Love Don't Live Here Anymore" (Kristofferson) – 3:47
11. "Silver Mantis" (T Bone Burnett) – 5:35

== Personnel ==
- Kris Kristoffersen – vocals
- Rita Coolidge – vocals
- Stephen Bruton – guitar, background vocals
- Jerry McGee – guitar
- Dennis Belfield – bass
- Donnie Fritts – keyboards
- Michael Utley – keyboards, background vocals
- Billy Swan – background vocals
- Sammy Creason – drums
- Horns arranged by Mike Utley and Darrell Leonard
- Strings arranged by Gene Page
- Saxophone solo on "Number One" by Jerry Jumonville

== Production ==
- Produced by: David Anderle
- Recorded and mixed by: Kent Nebergall
- Assistant engineer: Peggy McCreary
- Recorded at: Sunset Sound Recorders, Los Angeles
- Mastered at: The Mastering Lab by Mike Reese
- Production assistant: Ellen Vogt
- Album art direction: Roland Young
- Album design: Junie Osaki
- Photography: Francesco Scavullo & Annie Leibovitz
- Direction: Bert Block Management, Ridgefield, Connecticut

== Charts ==
Chart (1978)	Peak position
Australian (Kent Music Report)	87
UK Albums (Official Charts)	35
US Top Country Albums (Billboard)	24
US Billboard 200	106
