= Rappin' =

1985 film directed by Joel Silberg

- Theatrical release poster
- Directed by: Joel Silberg
- Written by: Adam Friedman; Robert J. Litz
- Produced by: Menahem Golan; Yoram Globus
- Starring: Mario Van Peebles; Tasia Valenza; Charles Flohe; Melvin Plowden
- Cinematography: David Gurfinkel
- Edited by: Marcus Manton
- Music by: Michael Linn
- Distributed by: Cannon Films
- Release date: May 10, 1985
- Running time: 92 minutes
- Country: United States
- Language: English
- Box office: $2,864,844

Rappin' is a 1985 American film directed by Joel Silberg, written by Adam Friedman and Robert J. Litz, produced by Menahem Golan and Yoram Globus and starring Mario Van Peebles. The film is a sequel to Breakin' 2: Electric Boogaloo, and is also known as Breakdance 3. Although it features Ice-T (who featured in Breakin' and Breakin' 2: Electric Boogaloo), Rappin' has a plot unconnected to the previous two films and features different lead characters and locations. It is also considered to be a companion piece to the documentary Breakin' 'n' Enterin'.

== Plot ==
Rappin' John Hood, an ex-convict, attempts to save his neighborhood from developers and hoodlums. Around the same time, one of the hoodlums' girlfriend, Dixie, persuades him to audition for a rap recording contract. Their interactions develop into a relationship.

== Cast ==
- Mario Van Peebles as John Hood
- Rutanya Alda as Cecilia
- Eyde Byrde as Grandma
- Rony Clanton as Cedric
- Charles Grant as Duane
- Melvin Plowden as "Fats"
- Jessie Daniels, Antoine Lundy, Stevie D. Lundy, Charles Nelson, Trisco Pearson as The Force M.D.s
- Richie Abanes as Richie
- Harry Goz as Thorndike
- Kadeem Hardison as "Moon"
- Eriq La Salle as "Ice"
- Leo O'Brien as Allan
- Thomas Ross as Thomas
- Joe Schad as Burton
- Tasia Valenza as Dixie
- Claudja Barry as herself
- Eugene Wilde as himself
- Richy Givens as Gangster

== Production ==
Mario Van Peebles' raps were overdubbed by Master Gee of the Sugarhill Gang, who also wrote one part and whose brother Leo plays the role of Allan. The film was filmed in and around Pittsburgh.

Ice-T's small role is uncredited and he reportedly provided the rhymes, including the hero John Hood's climactic lines, "Can't stop / Won't stop / Climbing that mountain 'till we reach the top!" Two verses of his 1985 single "Killers" feature mid-way through the film. Brothers Evil E and Hen-Gee, both of whom would go on to work with Ice-T, feature in the film.

== Featured songs ==
- "Born to Love" – Claudja Barry
- "Rappin'" – Lovebug Starski
- "Snack Attack" – Melvin Plowden, Mario Van Peebles, Eriq La Salle, Kadeem Hardison, Richie Abanes
- "The Fight Rap" – Lovebug Starski
- "Neighborhood Walk" – Mario Van Peebles
- "Itchin' for a Scratch" – The Force M.D.'s
- "Flame in the Fire" – Warren Mills
- "Call Me" – D. Terrell
- "If You Want To (FU12)" – Lajuan Carter
- "Golly Gee" – Tuff, Inc.
- "First Love Never Dies" – Eugene Wilde, Joanna Gardner

== Reception ==
The film earned $2.9 million at the US box office.

== See also ==
- List of hood films
