= The Best of You (album) =

1980 album by Booker T. Jones

Studio album by Booker T. Jones
- Released: 1980
- Label: A&M SP-4798
- Producer: David Anderle & Booker T. Jones

Booker T. Jones chronology
Try And Love Again (1978)	The Best of You (1980)	I Want You (1981)

The Best of You is an album by Booker T. Jones. It was released on the A&M label in 1980. It includes the hit singles "The Best of You", "We Could Stay Together" and "You Got Me Spinnin'".

== Background ==
The album was produced by David Anderle. Musicians that played on the album included, Dennis Belfield, James Gadson, Marlo Henderson, Michael Sembello, Luther Waters and Owen Waters. Rita Coolidge performs on one song, "We Could Stay Together".

== Reception ==
The four Record World Picks of the Week for the week of 3 May were, Power by The Temptations, The Best of You by Booker T. Jones, Dream Come True by Earl Klugh and Un Poco Loco by Bobby Hutcherson. The magazine had mixed up Booker T. Jones' and The Temptations album pictures. The review of the album was positive with Jones' pleasant voice and the pop appeal being noted as well as seven of the compositions being originals. The reviewer also wrote that Jones was most effective on the slow ballads and gave the title track and "Will You Be the One" as examples.

The album received a positive review in the 17 May issue of Record World. The reviewer indicated that listeners would possibly be surprised that after listening to "Green Onions" and the other instrumental hits of Booker T. & the MGs during the sixties that Booker T. Jones had a wonderful singing voice. The review was finished off with "Discover an exceptional talent again".

== Airplay ==
It was reported in the 13 September issue of Record World that Booker T. Jones was currently on tour with Rita Coolridge. The album was steadily getting a hold in stations in the Midwest and it had a rapid progression towards the Northeast. It was also noted that in addition to the title track, other tracks on the album were of interest to other radio programming formats.

== Charts ==
The album debuted at 185 in the Record World Albums 151-200 chart for the week of 30 August 1980. It peaked at No. 182 for the week of 6 September and held the position until the week of 20 September.

For the week of 20 September, The Best of You debuted at No. 49 in the Record World Black Oriented Album chart. It peaked at No. 48 the following week.

== Singles ==
"The Best of You" was backed with "Let's Go Dancin'" and released on A&M 2234-S in June 1980. It was a Record World Single Pick for the week of 21 June. The reviewer wrote that he was in rare form with the song and his voice shimmering alongside the prominent guitar. The strong crossover potential of the song was also noted.

A single, "You Got Me Spinning" bw "The Best of You" was released in New Zealand on A&M K 8946 in 1980. It was a chart hit spending a week in the New Zealand chart, peaking at No. 44.

"We Could Stay Together" featured Jones and Rita Coolridge. Backed with "The Best of You", the single was released in Australia on A&M K-8030 in September. It was a chart hit, peaking at No. 60.

"Cookie" bw "Will You Be the One" was released on A&M 2279-S in October. It was one of the Billboard Top Single Picks for the week of 18 October. It was reviewed in Record World the following week. The reviewer wrote that Jones' organ was kept to a minimum while he concentrated on what was described as smooth, warm tenor. The reviewer also noted the potential for several audiences.

== Tracks ==
=== Side A ===
1. "You Got Me Spinnin'", (Booker T. Jones) - 4:02
2. "The Best of You", (Booker T. Jones) - 5:18
3. "Cookie", (Booker T. Jones) - 3:51
4. "Pride and Joy", (Booker T. Jones) - 4:43

=== Side B ===
1. "Down To the Wire", (Booker T. Jones/Lenny Macaluso/Pat Summerson) - 5:27
2. "Stand", (Sylvester Stewart) - 4:33
3. "We Could Stay Together", (Booker T. Jones) - 4:54
4. "Will You Be the One", (Booker T. Jones/Mary Unobsky) - 3"32
