= The Best of You =

1980 single by Booker T. Jones

Single by Booker T. Jones

from the album The Best of You
- B-side: "Let's Go Dancin'"
- Released: 1980
- Length: 3:57
- Label: A&M 2234-S
- Songwriter: Booker T. Jones
- Producers: David Anderle & Booker T. Jones

"The Best of You" is a song by American musician Booker T. Jones and a single from the album The Best of You (1980). The B-side to the single is "Let's Go Dancin'".

== Booker T. Jones version ==
=== Background ===
"The Best of You" backed with "Let's Go Dancin'" was released as a 45 rpm single on A&M 2234-S in 1980.

The song is also used as the B side for Jones' single "We Could Stay Together" which was a hit in Australia in 1980, and "You Got Me Spinning" which was a hit in New Zealand in 1982.

=== Reception ===
Jones' album was one of the four Record World Picks of the Week for the week of 3 May. The review of the album was positive with his pleasant voice and the pop appeal being noted. The reviewer also wrote that Jones was most effective on the slow ballads and gave "The Best of You" and "Will You Be the One" as examples.

"The Best of You" was a Record World Single Pick for the week of 21 June. The reviewer wrote that Jones was in rare form with the song and his voice was shimmering alongside the prominent guitar. The reviewer also mentioned the strong crossover potential of the song.

== Kenny Thomas version ==
"Best of You"

Single by Kenny Thomas

from the album Voices
- B-side: "De Grooveski"
- Released: September 23, 1991
- Length: 3:43
- Label: Cooltempo
- Songwriter: Booker T. Jones
- Producer: Ian Green

Kenny Thomas singles chronology
"Thinking About Your Love" (1991)	"Best of You" (1991)	"Tender Love" (1991)

=== Background ===
The song was given a new audience in 1991 when the song was covered by English singer Kenny Thomas, retitled "Best of You", from his debut album, Voices (1991). Thomas's version, produced by Ian Green was released by Cooltempo Records and reached No. 11 in the United Kingdom and also charted in France, Germany, Ireland, Luxembourg, the Netherlands, and New Zealand.

=== Charts ===
==== Weekly charts ====
Chart (1991–1992)	Peak position
Australia (ARIA)	197
Europe (Eurochart Hot 100)	27
Europe (European Hit Radio)	10
France (SNEP)	23
Germany (GfK)	66
Ireland (IRMA)	27
Luxembourg (Radio Luxembourg)	9
Netherlands (Single Top 100)	87
New Zealand (Recorded Music NZ)	31
UK Singles (OCC)	11
UK Airplay (Music Week)	2
UK Dance (Music Week)	2
UK Club Chart (Record Mirror)	2

==== Year-end charts ====
Chart (1991)	Position
UK Club Chart (Record Mirror)	46
