= Anytime...Anywhere =

Studio album by Rita Coolidge
- Released: March 1977
- Studio: Sunset Sound and A&M Studios (Hollywood, California): Studio 55 (Los Angeles, California)
- Genre: Pop
- Length: 36:03
- Label: A&M
- Producer: David Anderle

Rita Coolidge chronology
It's Only Love (1975)	Anytime...Anywhere (1977)	Love Me Again (1978)

Professional ratings
Review scores
Source	Rating
Christgau's Record Guide	C

Anytime...Anywhere is the sixth album by Rita Coolidge released in 1977 on the A&M Records label. The album is her most successful, reaching #6 on the Billboard 200 and having been certified platinum (over 1 million U.S. copies sold). The album spawned three Billboard top twenty hits; a cover of Boz Scaggs' "We're All Alone" (#7), a cover of The Temptations' "The Way You Do The Things You Do" (#20), and the album's biggest hit, "(Your Love Has Lifted Me) Higher and Higher" (#2), a remake of Jackie Wilson's "(Your Love Keeps Lifting Me) Higher and Higher".

== Track listing ==
=== Side one ===
1. "(Your Love Has Lifted Me) Higher and Higher" (Paul Smith, Gary Jackson, Raynard Miner, Billy Davis) – 3:59
2. "The Way You Do the Things You Do" (William "Smokey" Robinson, Robert Rogers) – 3:35
3. "We're All Alone" (Boz Scaggs) – 3:38
4. "I Feel the Burden (Being Lifted Off My Shoulders)" (Glen Clark) – 2:46
5. "I Don't Want to Talk About It" (Danny Whitten) – 3:36

=== Side two ===
1. "Words" (Barry Gibb, Robin Gibb, Maurice Gibb) – 3:25
2. "Good Times" (Sam Cooke) – 2:42
3. "Who's to Bless and Who's to Blame" (Kris Kristofferson) – 3:37
4. "Southern Lady" (Michael Hazlewood) – 3:30
5. "The Hungry Years" (Neil Sedaka, Howard Greenfield) – 4:18

== Production ==
- David Anderle – producer
- Warren Dewey – recording engineer
- Marty Lewis – recording engineer
- Kent Nebergall – recording engineer, mixing engineer
- Mike Reese – mastering at The Mastering Lab (Hollywood, California)
- Roland Young – art direction
- Chuck Beeson – album design
- Dick Zimmerman – photography
- Ellen Vogt – production Assistant

Source: Anytime...Anywhere album cover

== Personnel ==
- Rita Coolidge – lead vocals, backing vocals (1), harmony vocals (5)
- Booker T. Jones – organ (1–3, 7), synthesizers (1), string arrangements (1, 3, 6), track arrangements (1–3, 6), backing vocals (2, 7), electric piano (6, 7), harmony vocals (6), arrangements (7)
- Michael Utley – electric piano (1, 9), synthesizers (1, 3, 6), acoustic piano (2–8, 10), organ (4, 8, 9)
- Jerry McGee – electric guitar (1, 9), electric rhythm guitar (2), acoustic guitar (3, 5–7, 10), lead guitar (4)
- Dean Parks – electric guitar (1, 7, 10), electric slide guitar (2), acoustic guitar (3, 5), lead electric guitar (3), rhythm guitar (4), guitars (8), horn and string arrangements (10)
- Al Perkins – pedal steel guitar (5)
- Leland Sklar – bass
- Mike Baird – drums (1–3, 6, 7)
- Sammy Creason – drums (4, 5, 8–10)
- Bobbye Hall – congas (4, 9), tambourine (4, 9)
- Gayle Levant – harp (10)
- Nick DeCaro – string arrangements (5)
- Kim Carnes – backing vocals (1, 2, 7)
- Danny Timms – backing vocals (1, 2, 7)
- Venetta Fields – backing vocals (4, 8, 9)
- Clydie King – backing vocals (4, 8, 9)
- Sherlie Matthews – backing vocals (4, 8, 9)

== Charts ==
Chart (1977)	Peak position
Australian (Kent Music Report)	9
Dutch Albums (Album Top 100)	15
New Zealand Albums (RMNZ)	40
UK Albums (OCC)	7
US Top Country Albums (Billboard)	23
US Billboard 200	6

== Certifications and sales ==
Region	Certification	Certified units/sales
Australia (ARIA)	Platinum	50,000^{^}
Canada (Music Canada)	Platinum	100,000^{^}
United Kingdom (BPI)	Gold	100,000^{^}
United States (RIAA)	Platinum	1,000,000^{^}
^{^} Shipments figures based on certification alone.
