= Love Me Again (album) =

Studio album by Rita Coolidge
- Released: May 1978
- Studio: Sunset Sound Studios (Hollywood, California)
- Genre: Pop
- Length: 34:15
- Label: A&M
- Producer: David Anderle, Booker T. Jones

Rita Coolidge chronology
| Anytime…Anywhere (1977) | Love Me Again (1978) | Natural Act (1978) |

Love Me Again is an album by the American musician Rita Coolidge, released in 1978 through A&M Records. "You" was released as the first single. It was previously recorded by Australian recording artist Marcia Hines. Coolidge's version, in contrast to Hines', is more mellow in tone and it became a Top 40 hit in both the United States and Canada during the summer of 1978. Despite the song having previously hit in Australia, Coolidge's version did not chart there. The title track "Love Me Again" was released as a single and then covered and appeared as a single for Patti Austin in 1980.

== Critical reception ==
The Globe and Mail wrote that Coolidge "is at her most effective when the beat is slow and she gets plenty of time to think... 'Slow Dancer', with Booker T. in the background, is the best cut on the album, and a tedious version of 'Bye Bye Love' is the worst."

== Track listing ==
=== Side one ===
1. "You" (Tom Snow) – 3:14
2. "Slow Dancer" (Boz Scaggs, George Daly) – 4:01
3. "Sweet Inspiration" (Dan Penn, Spooner Oldham) – 2:59
4. "Love Me Again" (David Lasley, Allee Willis) – 3:38
5. "It Just Keeps You Dancing" (Booker T. Jones, Donna Weiss) – 3:04

=== Side two ===
1. "Bye Bye, Love" (Felice Bryant, Boudleaux Bryant) – 2:58
2. "The Jealous Kind" (Robert Charles Guidry) – 4:19
3. "Hello Love, Goodbye" (Johnny Rodriguez) – 3:45
4. "You're So Fine" (Lance Finnie, William Schofield) – 3:02
5. "Songbird" (Christine McVie) – 2:57

== Personnel ==
- Rita Coolidge – vocals
- Booker T. Jones – organ (1–8), second vocals (2, 10), Rhodes electric piano (4, 10), synthesizers (5), backing vocals (5), acoustic piano (9, 10), string and track arrangements
- Michael Utley – electric piano (1, 3, 5), acoustic piano (2, 6, 8, 10), Rhodes electric piano (7), synthesizers (7, 10), organ (9)
- Jay Graydon – guitars (1, 5, 7), lead guitar (2, 4), acoustic guitar (9, 10), electric guitar (10)
- Jerry McGee – guitars (1, 3, 5), rhythm guitar (2), electric guitar (4, 6, 8, 9), acoustic guitar (9)
- Stephen Bruton – guitars (3), acoustic guitar (4, 6, 8), electric guitar (9)
- Dennis Belfield – bass
- Mike Baird – drums (1–3, 5–7, 10)
- Sammy Creason – drums (4, 8, 9)
- Steve Forman – congas (5), tambourine (9)
- Jules Chaikin – conductor
- Jim Haas – backing vocals (1)
- Julia Tillman Waters – backing vocals (3, 8)
- Luther Waters – backing vocals (3, 8)
- Maxine Willard Waters – backing vocals (3, 8)
- Oren Waters – backing vocals (3, 8)
- Larry Lee – backing vocals (5)
- Cory Wells – backing vocals (5)

=== Production ===
- David Anderle – producer
- Booker T. Jones – producer
- Jim Isaacson – engineer
- Kent Nebergall – engineer, mix engineer
- Peggy McCreary – second mix engineer
- Mike Reese – mastering at The Mastering Lab (Hollywood, California)
- Ellen Vogt – production assistant
- Roland Young – art direction
- Junie Osaki – design
- Annie Leibovitz – photography

== Charts ==
| Chart (1978) | Peak position |
|---|---|
| Australian (Kent Music Report) | 26 |
| UK Albums (OCC) | 51 |
| US Billboard 200 | 32 |

== Certifications and sales ==
| Region | Certification | Certified units/sales |
|---|---|---|
| Australia (ARIA) | Gold | 20,000^{^} |
| Canada (Music Canada) | Gold | 50,000^{^} |
| United Kingdom (BPI) | Silver | 60,000^{^} |
| United States (RIAA) | Gold | 500,000^{^} |
^{^} Shipments figures based on certification alone.
