= It's Only Love (Rita Coolidge album) =

1975 album by Rita Coolidge

Studio album by Rita Coolidge
- Released: November 1975
- Studio: Sunset Sound Studios, Los Angeles
- Genre: Pop
- Length: 37:00
- Label: A&M
- Producer: David Anderle

Rita Coolidge chronology
Breakaway (1974)	It's Only Love (1975)	Anytime…Anywhere (1977)

It's Only Love is a 1975 album by Rita Coolidge and was released on the A&M Records label.

== Track listing ==
=== Side one ===
1. "Born to Love Me" (Bob Morrison) – 3:38
2. "I Wanted It All" (Jackie DeShannon, John Bettis) – 3:05
3. "Keep The Candle Burning" (Bennie Gallagher, Graham Lyle) – 3:12
4. "Don't Let Love Pass You By" (Donnie Fritts, Eddie Hinton) – 3:38
5. "It's Only Love" (Bob Morrison) – 3:25

=== Side two ===
1. "Star" (Donna Weiss) – 3:26
2. "Late Again" (Kris Kristofferson) – 4:10
3. "My Rock and Roll Man" (Troy Seals, Mentor Williams, Eddie Setser) – 3:16
4. "Mean to Me" (Roy Turk, Fred Ahlert) – 4:37
5. "Am I Blue" (Grant Clarke, Harry Akst) – 4:37

== Personnel ==
- Rita Coolidge – vocals, backing vocals
- Michael Utley – keyboards
- Booker T. Jones – organ (6)
- Barbara Carroll – acoustic piano (9, 10)
- Jerry McGee – guitars
- Dean Parks – guitars
- Fred Tackett – guitars
- Al Perkins – pedal steel guitar
- Leland Sklar – bass (1–8)
- Chuck Domanico – bass (9, 10)
- Sammy Creason – drums (1–8)
- Colin Bailey – drums (9, 10)
- Bobbye Hall – percussion
- David Campbell – orchestral arrangements
- Jim Horn – horn arrangements (3)
- Venetta Fields – backing vocals
- Brooks Hunnicutt – backing vocals
- Clydie King – backing vocals
- Sherlie Matthews – backing vocals
- Petsye Powell – backing vocals
- Jennifer Warnes – backing vocals

=== Production ===
- David Anderle – producer
- John Haeny – recording engineer
- Kent Nebergall – recording engineer
- Marty Lewis – remix engineer
- Doug Sax – mastering at The Mastering Lab (Hollywood, California)
- Roland Young – art direction
- Junie Osaki – design
- Bob Jenkins – photography
- Bert Block – management

== Charts ==
Chart (1977)	Position
US Billboard 200	85
