= Heartbreak Radio =

Studio album by Rita Coolidge
- Released: August 1981
- Studio: Record One and Sound Castle Recorders (Los Angeles, California)
- Genre: Pop
- Label: A&M
- Producer: Andrew Gold

Rita Coolidge chronology
Greatest Hits (1980)	Heartbreak Radio (1981)	Never Let You Go (1983)

Heartbreak Radio is a 1981 album by Rita Coolidge and was released on the A&M Records label.

== Track listing ==
=== Side one ===
1. "Walk On In" (Carole King) – 3:24
2. "One More Heartache" (Bobby Rogers, Smokey Robinson, Marv Tarplin, Ronnie White, Pete Moore) – 3:27
3. "The Closer You Get" (James P. Pennington, Mark Gray) – 4:28
4. "Wishin' and Hopin'" (Hal David, Burt Bacharach) – 3:43
5. "Heartbreak Radio" (Troy Seals, Frankie Miller) – 3:56
6. "Man and a Woman" (Jerry Piopelle, John Harris) – 3:38

=== Side two ===
1. "I Did My Part" (Naomi Neville) – 4:05
2. "Hold On (I Feel Our Love Is Changing)" (Will Jennings, Joe Sample) – 4:58
3. "Basic Lady" (Allen Toussaint) – 3:03
4. "Stranger To Me Now" (Donna Weiss, Mary Unobsky) – 4:57
5. "Take It Home" (Wilton Felder, Will Jennings) – 3:17

== Personnel ==
- Rita Coolidge – vocals
- Michael Utley – electric piano (1, 2, 6), organ (1, 4, 7, 11), acoustic piano (5, 9, 10)
- Nick DeCaro – accordion (6)
- Bill Payne – electric piano (8, 11)
- Andrew Gold – electric guitars (1, 3), guitar solo (1, 5, 7, 10), percussion (1–3, 5, 6, 10, 11), backing vocals (1, 3, 5, 7, 9), electric slide guitar (2), keyboards (3), right electric guitar (4, 5, 8, 11), shaker (8), field drum (9), rolling snare drum (9), acoustic guitar (10)
- Waddy Wachtel – middle electric guitars (1), electric guitars (2, 7, 9), acoustic guitar (3), left electric guitar (4, 5), electric volume pedal guitar (10)
- Dean Parks – left acoustic guitar (6), left electric guitar (8, 11)
- Fred Tackett – right acoustic guitar (6), acoustic guitar (7)
- Bob Glaub – bass (1, 2, 4–11)
- Jeff Porcaro – drums (1)
- Russ Kunkel – drums (2, 5, 8–10), congas (8)
- Mike Botts – drums (3, 4, 7, 11), congas (6)
- Jim Horn – saxophone (2, 11)
- Gordon Goodwin – horns (4)
- Bill Green – horns (4)
- Tom Saviano – horns (4)
- David Campbell – string arrangements, horn arrangements (4)
- Jim Gordon – horns (5)
- Jerry Jumonville – horns (5), horn arrangements (5, 7)
- Joel Peskin – horns (5, 7)
- Bruce Paulson – horns (5, 7)
- Steve Madaio – horns (5, 7)
- Lee Thornburg – horns (5, 7)
- Kenny Edwards – backing vocals (1, 3–5), bass (3)
- Brock Walsh – backing vocals (1, 3, 5)
- Rosemary Butler – backing vocals (2, 7)
- Nicolette Larson – backing vocals (2, 4, 7)
- Maureen McDonald – backing vocals (2, 7)
- JD Souther – backing vocals (6)
- Lenny Castro – backing vocals (9)
- William "Smitty" Smith – backing vocals (9)

Choir (Tracks 8 & 11)

- Margaret Branch, Paulette Brown, Lenny Castro, Venetta Fields, Cleopatra Kennedy, Sherlie Matthews, Petsye Powell and William "Smitty" Smith

=== Production ===
- Andrew Gold – producer
- Jim Nipar – recording, mixing
- Mitch Gibson – additional recording
- Dennis Kirk – additional recording
- Niko Bolas – recording assistant, mix assistant
- Jamie Ledner – recording assistant, mix assistant
- Liz Heller – production assistant
- Jeff Ayeroff – art direction
- Margery Melton – design
- Antonio Lopez – illustration
- Ella Braunstein – photography (UK release)

== Charts ==
Chart (1981)	Position
US Billboard 200	160
