= Love Is a House =

1987 single by Force MDs

Single by Force MDs

from the album Touch and Go
- B-side: Love Is a House (instrumental)
- Released: May 1987
- Recorded: 1986
- Genre: R&B; soul
- Length: 5:06 (album version); 4:18 (radio single version)
- Label: Tommy Boy; Warner Bros.
- Songwriter(s): Geoff Gurd, Gina Foster; Martin Lascelles
- Producer(s): Geoff Gurd, Martin Lascelles

Force MDs singles chronology
"One Plus One" (1986)	"Love Is a House" (1987)	"Touch and Go" (1987)

"Love Is a House" is a hit song recorded by American R&B group Force M.D.'s and featured on the group's 1987 album, Touch and Go. Written by budding British singer/songwriter Gina Foster in collaboration with Geoff Gurd and Martin Lascelles, the song became the Force M.D.'s first and only number one hit on the R&B charts, peaking at that position for two weeks in the summer of 1987. "Love Is a House" was also the group's third R&B top ten hit and the group's second and final charting single on the Billboard Hot 100, peaking at number seventy-eight.

== Charts ==
Weekly charts

Chart (1987)	Peak position
U.S. Billboard Hot 100	78
U.S. Billboard Hot Black Singles	1

== Gina Foster version ==
"Love is a House"

Single by Gina Foster

from the album Everything I Want
- A-side: "Love is a House"
- B-side: "Take Me Away"
- Written: G. Foster, M. Lascelles, G. Gurd
- Released: June, 1989
- Label: Deconstruction PB 42747
- Producer(s): Leon Sylvers III

Gina Foster singles chronology
"Love is a House" (1989)	"Cry In Vain" (1990)

In 1989, Foster released her own version, also featuring it on her album Everything I Want, released the following year. Backed with "Take Me Away", it was a hit for her in the UK, peaking at no. 92, and staying there for a week.

=== Charts ===
Weekly charts

Chart (1989)	Peak position
U.K.	92

=== Appears on ===
Foster's version appears on the Luxury Soul compilation that was released in 2019.
