= Priscilla Coolidge =

American singer (1940–2014)

- Born: April 20, 1941; Lafayette, Tennessee, U.S.
- Died: October 2, 2014 (aged 73); Thousand Oaks, California, U.S.
- Children: Paul Satterfield

Priscilla Coolidge (April 20, 1941 – October 2, 2014) was an American recording artist and sister of singer Rita Coolidge.

== Life and career ==
Coolidge was born in Lafayette, Tennessee. Between 1969 and 1979, she was married to Booker T. Jones, who produced Coolidge's first solo album, 1970's Gypsy Queen. Then the pair collaborated as a duo on three albums: 1971's Booker T. & Priscilla; 1972's Home Grown; and 1973's Chronicles, which included the song "Time", written by her sister Rita, which was allegedly "borrowed" by drummer Jim Gordon (formerly of Eric Clapton's band Derek and the Dominos and Rita's former boyfriend) and became the famous instrumental coda at the end of "Layla". Jones produced Priscilla's final solo album, Flying, in 1979; their marriage ended that year.

In 1981 Coolidge married Ed Bradley, a journalist, broadcaster, and reporter. Her marriage to Bradley ended in divorce, and she later married Michael Seibert.

=== Walela ===
In 1997, Coolidge was one of the founding members of Walela, a Native American-inspired music trio, that also included Coolidge's sister Rita, plus Priscilla's daughter Laura Satterfield. The trio released studio albums in 1997 (Walela) and 2000 (Unbearable Love), a live album and DVD (Live in Concert) in 2004 and a compilation album (The Best of Walela) in 2007. Walela means hummingbird in Cherokee. Coolidge considered this group important not only in honoring her ancestors, who she believes were of Cherokee descent, but also in bringing their culture to others. The Coolidge family is not enrolled in any Native American tribe, nor is there evidence of a direct ancestor listed on the Dawes Rolls. Her sister Rita has said that their great-aunt was on the Trail of Tears, but has also said that she "did a lot of research" but that "we were not able to get the documents to prove that our ancestors were on the Trail".

== Death ==
Coolidge and her husband, Michael Seibert, were found dead in their home in Thousand Oaks, California, in what police later described as a murder-suicide. On October 2, 2014, police were called after neighbors heard the couple engaged in a heated argument. Seibert shot Priscilla in the head, and soon after killed himself.
