= I'd Rather Leave While I'm in Love =

Song performed by Rita Coolidge

"I'd Rather Leave While I'm in Love" is a song co-written by Peter Allen and Carole Bayer Sager. It was first released by Bayer Sager on her 1977 debut album, and it was also released as a single, charting at No. 98 in Australia. The song was further popularized by Rita Coolidge in 1979, and recorded by a number of other artists.

== Charts ==
Chart (1978)	Peak position
Australia (Kent Music Report)	98

== Rita Coolidge version ==
"I'd Rather Leave While I'm in Love" was a comeback single for Rita Coolidge in 1979. Of her four previous singles between 1978 and 1979, two had not charted, while two had been in the top 20 on the Adult Contemporary charts, though not in the top 10. In contrast, the Coolidge version of the "I'd Rather Leave While I'm in Love" reached number 3 on the US Adult Contemporary chart, as well as charting highly elsewhere. It has been described as one of Coolidge's "most triumphant performances", and was included on Coolidge's Satisfied album (A&M, 1979).

=== Chart performance ===
Chart (1979–80)	Peak position
US Billboard Adult Contemporary	3
US Billboard Hot 100	38
US Hot Country Songs (Billboard)	32

== Dusty Springfield version ==
The song was also recorded by Dusty Springfield and appeared on her 1978 album It Begins Again.

== Popular culture ==
- In the United Kingdom, the song was used in a Public Information Film warning about the dangers of drunk driving.
