= All Time High =

Single by Rita Coolidge

from the album Octopussy
- B-side: "All Time High" (Extended Instrumental Version)
- Released: June 1983
- Genre: Smooth jazz; pop
- Length: 3:02
- Label: A&M; EMI
- Composer: John Barry
- Lyricist: Tim Rice
- Producers: Stephen Short; Phil Ramone

James Bond theme singles chronology
"For Your Eyes Only" (1981)	"All Time High" (1983)	"A View to a Kill" (1985)

Music video
- "All Time High" on YouTube

Audio sample
- file; help

"All Time High" is a 1983 song by American singer-songwriter Rita Coolidge that serves as the theme song to the James Bond film Octopussy (1983) and is included on its accompanying soundtrack album. Written by John Barry and Tim Rice and produced by Stephen Short and Phil Ramone, the song was released through A&M Records in 1983.

== Background ==
"All Time High" marked the return of regular James Bond theme composer John Barry after his absence from the 1981 For Your Eyes Only soundtrack for tax problems. He wanted to work again with Don Black, but his commitments to the musical Merlin forced Barry to seek another lyricist. Tim Rice quickly accepted the invitation. Barry's friend Phil Ramone produced the song, while recording and mixing of the track is credited to Stephen Short. The soundtrack for Octopussy was recorded over five days in early April 1983.

The movie's peculiar title negated the possibility of its theme song being based on its title, although Rice would later state: "I think it would have been more interesting if we had tried to write a song called 'Octopussy'". Instead Barry suggested that Rice submit six potential song titles, and it was from these that "All Time High" was selected. Rice was provided with a copy of the script for Octopussy and also viewed the shooting of some scenes from the movie at Pinewood Studios, Rice visiting Pinewood in mid-December 1982. The completed lyrics for "All Time High" would include the line "We're two of a kind" which in the movie is spoken by Octopussy (played by Maud Adams) to James Bond (Roger Moore), and the title evidently refers to the key aerial sequences featured in the movie.

Prior to Rita Coolidge being assigned the Octopussy theme, Mari Wilson was a contender, a British singer whose retro-image evoked the mid-'60s when the Bond series originated; but Wilson's lack of a US-profile led to a negative decision. In January 1983, the producer of Octopussy: Cubby Broccoli, stated that he hoped to have current hitmaker Laura Branigan sing the movie's theme song, an artist choice which both Barry and Rice have stated would have pleased them. However, on March 29, 1983 Rita Coolidge was revealed as the singer, a seemingly surprising choice in that Coolidge's career peak had occurred some six years previously.

Coolidge recalls that Barbara Broccoli, daughter of Cubby Broccoli and herself the assistant director of Octopussy, was a fan of Coolidge and made a point of playing Coolidge records around her father until "one day [he said], "Who is that? That's the voice I want for the movie." Rice still had to complete his contribution as the singer arrived in the studio, with Coolidge stating that "we were waiting for the lyrics as the instrumental track had already been done." The chorus of "All Time High" features a lyric similar to that of Coolidge's #2 hit "(Your Love Has Lifted Me) Higher and Higher" whose lyric "When you wrap your loving arms around me I can stand up and face the world again" is echoed by the "All Time High" lyric "We'll take on the world and win".

"All Time High" was the first theme song from a James Bond film for which a video was made including scenes of a film, excluding the previous theme song "For Your Eyes Only" by Sheena Easton. The video consisting of footage of Coolidge – shot in soft focus – singing in an apparent Indian palace (in fact the Royal Pavilion at Brighton) intercut with scenes from the film.

== Impact ==
"All Time High" was used as catch phrase in the promotion for its parent movie with posters advertising Octopussy as "James Bond's all time high." Generally unmentioned in reviews for Octopussy, "All Time High" was cited by The Washington Post as "inane...its silly Tim Rice lyrics sung with deadly lethargy by Rita Coolidge."

In the US "All Time High" reached #36 on the Billboard Hot 100 in August 1983. Adult contemporary radio was much more receptive, with "All Time High" spending four weeks at #1 as ranked by Billboard magazine. Coolidge had previously topped the Adult Contemporary chart in 1977 with "We're All Alone".

On the UK Singles Chart, "All Time High" rose no higher than #75 and remains the lowest-charting James Bond theme; "The Man with the Golden Gun" by Lulu had failed to reach the then fifty-rung chart in 1974 and "Moonraker" by Shirley Bassey fell short of the Top 75 in 1979. However, the track became a major hit in several European countries: Austria – #14; Finland – #11; Germany – #13; the Netherlands – #8; Sweden – #8; and Switzerland – #7: Coolidge had previously only charted in one of these six countries, that being the Netherlands (with "We're All Alone" – #15/1977) which was also the only one of the six countries where she'd chart again ("I Stand in Wonder", #56/1999). Additionally "All Time High" afforded Coolidge chart placements in Australia – #80; Canada – #38, New Zealand – #26, and South Africa – #8. The track was also ranked at #48 in the annual hit parade tally for 1983 in Brazil.

In January 1984, "All Time High" was put forward for consideration for an Academy Award nomination for Best Original Song in two full-page ads run in the entertainment trade papers; these ads also touted the full score of Octopussy. However, Octopussy failed to accrue any Academy Award nominations at the 56th Academy Awards.

== Legacy ==
According to the Billboard Book of Number One Adult Contemporary Hits by Wesley Hyatt, Coolidge considered "All Time High" to be an unfinished work and customarily would include the song in concert via her backing musicians playing it as an overture rather than singing it as part of her program. However, Coolidge did state in 2006: "It is a wonderful song and I am very proud to be a part of that family [of James Bond theme singers]."

"All Time High" was not originally featured on Never Let You Go, the Rita Coolidge album released in October 1983 although it does appear on some pressings. Since 1998, "All Time High" has been included on several Coolidge anthology releases including a 2001 retrospective on Spectrum Records entitled All Time High.

In 2012 Tim Rice described "All Time High" as "not one of the most exciting Bond songs ... just a nice, dreamy ballad."

== Covers ==
"All Time High" has been remade by Anita Meyer for her 1987 release Premiere and by Pulp in 1997 for David Arnold's Shaken and Stirred: The David Arnold James Bond Project album.

Shirley Bassey, for her 2002 release (and subsequently withdrawn) Bassey Sings Bond, and a dance version in 2006 by Kelly Llorenna. The song was referenced and then performed by John Bennett (Mark Wahlberg) and Norah Jones in the 2012 film Ted.

== See also ==
- Outline of James Bond
- List of Billboard Adult Contemporary number ones of 1983
