= Booker T. Jones =

American musician (born 1944)

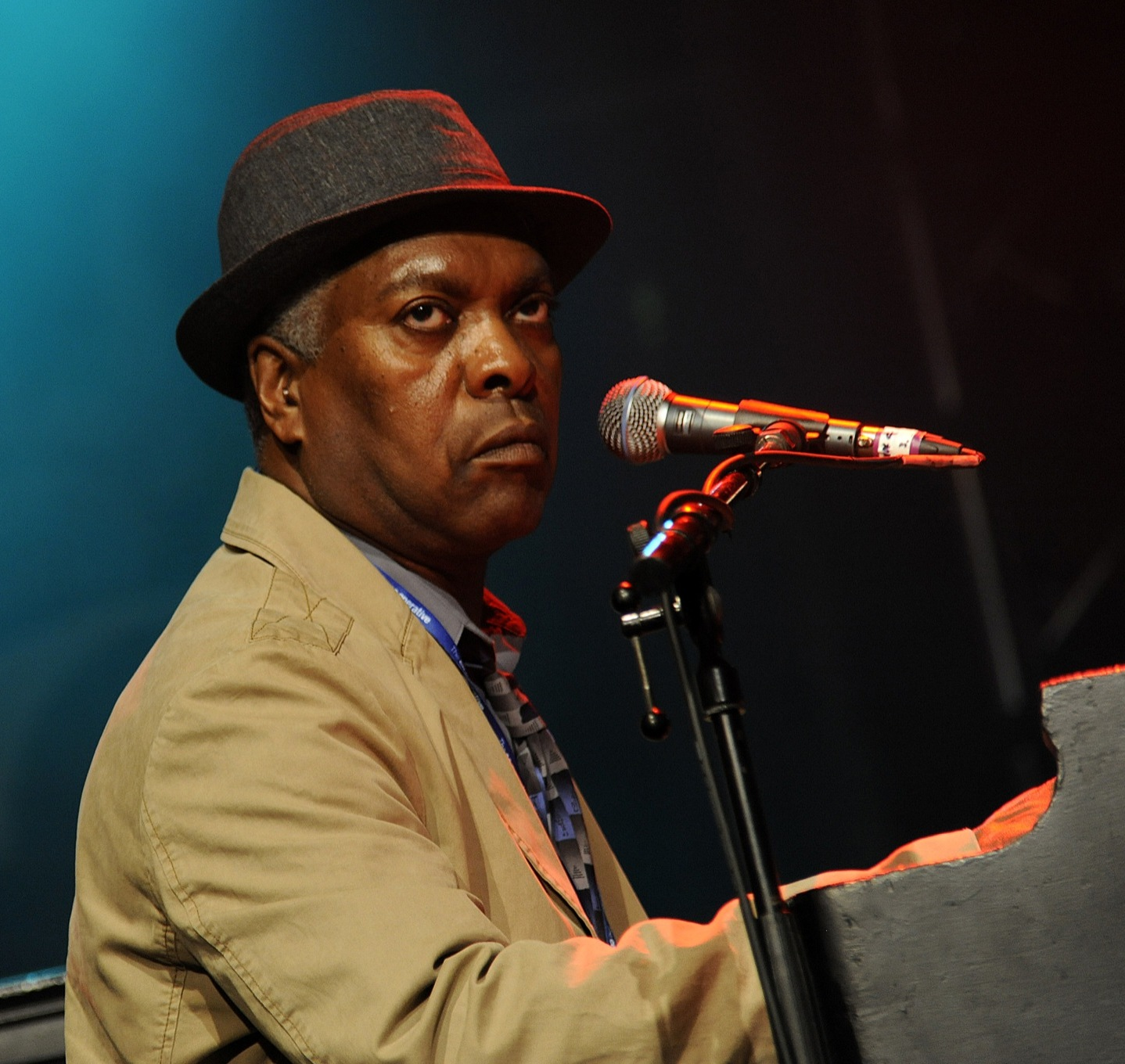
- Jones in 2009

Background information
- Also known as: Booker T.
- Born: Booker Taliaferro Jones Jr. November 12, 1944 (age 82); Memphis, Tennessee, U.S.
- Genres: R&B; instrumental rock; soul; electric blues
- Occupations: Musician; songwriter; record producer; arranger
- Instruments: Organ; piano; guitar; bass guitar; saxophone; vibraphone; flute
- Years active: 1960–present
- Labels: Atlantic; Stax; Anti-; A&M; MCA; Epic
- Website: bookert.com

Booker Taliaferro Jones Jr. (born November 12, 1944) is an American musician, songwriter, record producer and arranger, best known as the frontman of the band Booker T. & the M.G.'s. He has also worked as a session musician with many well-known artists of the 20th and 21st centuries, earning him a Grammy Award for Lifetime Achievement.

With the death of guitarist Steve Cropper on December 3, 2025, Jones is the last surviving original member of Booker T. & the M.G.’s.

== Background ==
Jones was born in Memphis, Tennessee, on November 12, 1944. He was named after his father, Booker T. Jones Sr., who was named in honor of Booker T. Washington, the educator. Jones Sr. was a science teacher at Memphis High School, providing the family with a relatively stable, lower middle-class lifestyle.

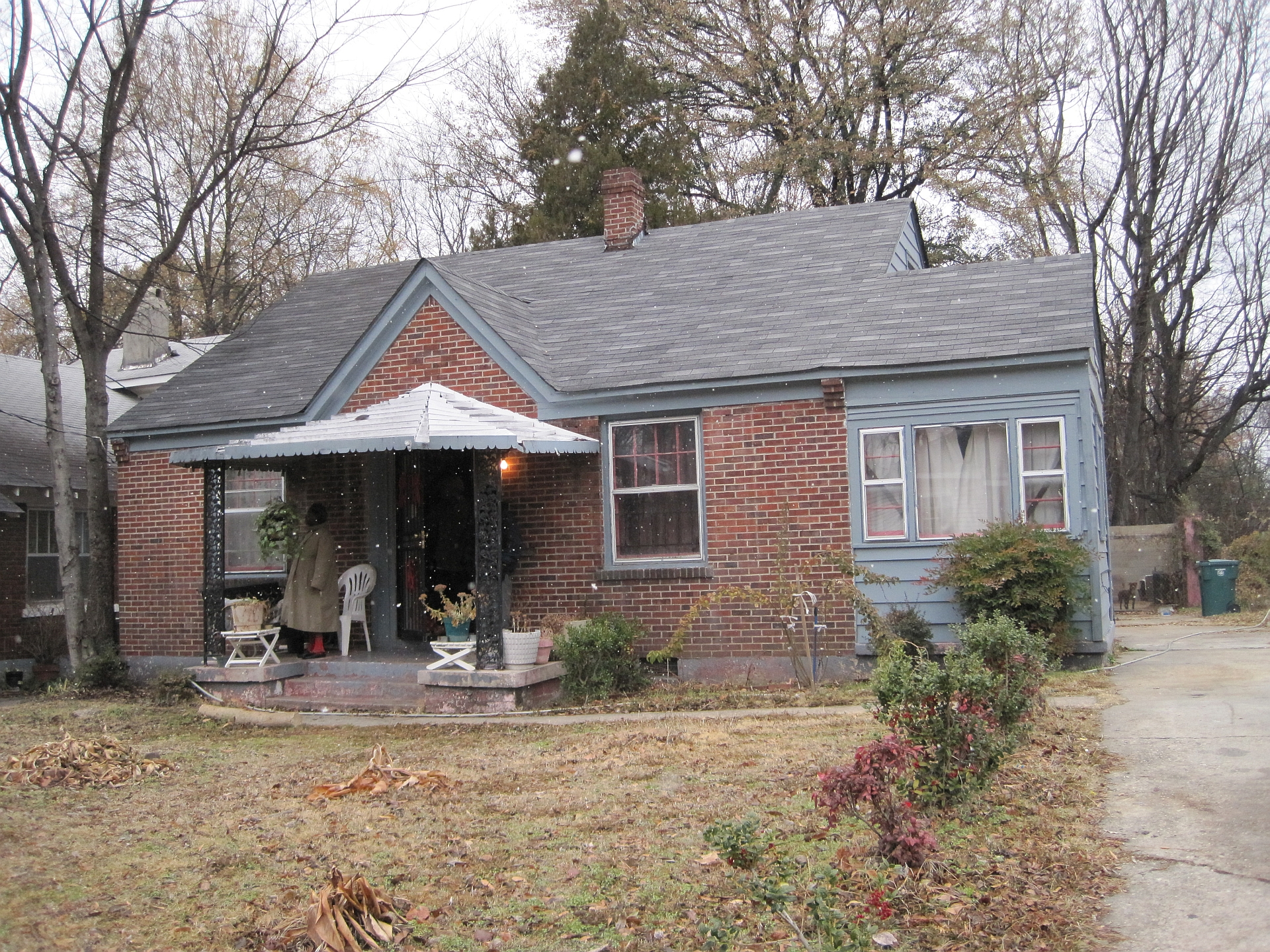
Booker T. Jones's childhood home on Edith Avenue in Memphis, Tennessee

Jones was musically a child prodigy, playing the oboe, saxophone, trombone, double bass, and piano at school and organ at church. Jones attended Booker T. Washington High School, the alma mater of Rufus Thomas, and collaborated with future stars like Isaac Hayes's writing partner David Porter, saxophonist Andrew Love of the Memphis Horns, soul singer/songwriter William Bell, and Earth, Wind & Fire's singer/songwriter Maurice White.

== Career ==
=== 1960s ===
Jones's entry into professional music came at the age of 16, when he played baritone saxophone on Satellite (soon to be Stax) Records' first hit, "Cause I Love You", by Carla and Rufus Thomas. Willie Mitchell hired Jones for his band, in which Jones started on sax and later moved to bass. It was here that he met Al Jackson Jr., whom he brought to Stax. Simultaneously, Jones formed a combo with Maurice White and David Porter, in which he played guitar.

While hanging around the Satellite Record Shop run by Estelle Axton, co-owner of Satellite Records with her brother Jim Stewart, Jones met record clerk Steve Cropper, who would become one of the MGs when the group formed in 1962. Besides Jones on organ and Cropper on guitar, Booker T. and the MGs featured Lewie Steinberg on bass guitar (eventually replaced by Donald "Duck" Dunn), and Al Jackson Jr. on drums. While still in high school, Jones co-wrote the group's classic instrumental "Green Onions", which was a massive hit in 1962.

Bob Altshuler wrote the sleeve notes on the first Booker T. & the M.G.'s album Green Onions released by Stax Records in 1962:

[His] musical talents became apparent at a very early age. By the time he entered high school, Booker was already a semi-professional, and quickly recognized as the most talented musician in his school. He was appointed director of the school band for four years, and in addition, organized the school dance orchestra which played for proms throughout the Mid-South. In the classroom, he concentrated on the studies of music theory and harmony. ... Booker's multiple activities earned him a coveted honour, that of being listed in the students' "Who's Who of American High Schools." Booker's first instrument was the string bass, but he soon switched to the organ. Booker came to the attention of record executive Jim Stewart in Memphis, and while still in high school he worked as a staff musician for Stax Records, appearing as sideman on many recording dates for that label. It became obvious that one day Booker would be ready to record under his own name and several months later Booker's first recording session was set.

Over the next few years, Jones divided his time between studying classical music composition, composing and transposition at Indiana University, playing with the MGs on the weekends back in Memphis, serving as a session musician with other Stax acts, and writing songs that became widely regarded as classics. He wrote, with Eddie Floyd, "I've Never Found a Girl (To Love Me Like You Do)", Otis Redding's "I Love You More Than Words Can Say", and, with William Bell, bluesman Albert King's "Born Under a Bad Sign" (later popularized by the British rock group Cream).

=== 1970s ===
In 1970, Jones moved to California and stopped playing sessions for Stax after becoming frustrated with Stax's treatment of the MGs as employees rather than musicians. Even though Jones was given the title of Vice President at Stax before leaving, as he put it, "There were titles given (to us) but we didn't actually make the decisions." While still under contract to Stax, he appeared on Stephen Stills's eponymous album (1970). The 1971 album Melting Pot would be the last Booker T. & the M.G.'s album issued on Stax.

He produced Bill Withers's 1971 debut album Just as I Am (on which Jones played guitar as well as keyboards), Rita Coolidge's album Love Me Again (1978) and Willie Nelson's album Stardust (1978). Jones has also added his keyboard playing to artists ranging from the R&B/pop/blues of Ray Charles to the folk rock/country rock of Neil Young.

=== 1980s ===
==== The Best of You ====
Jones released his Best of You album in 1980. It was his third solo release. It contained the songs, " You Got Me Spinnin'", "The Best Of You", "Cookie", " Pride and Joy", " Down To the Wire", "Stand", " We Could Stay Together", and "Will You Be the One". It was given a positive review in the 3 May issue of Record World. It had another review by Record World on the 17th of that month. The reviewer wrote that with the instrumental hits that Booker T. & The MGs had in the 1960s, who would have thought he possessed such a wonderful singing voice? And the advice to the reader was to discover this exceptional talent.

The song "The Best of You" was backed with "Let's Go Dancin'" and released as a single on A&M 2234-S in June 1980. It was a Record World Single Pick for the week of 21 June. The reviewer wrote that Jones was in rare form with the song and his voice was shimmering alongside the prominent guitar. The strong crossover potential of the song was also noted.

"We Could Stay Together" which featured Jones and Rita Coolridge was backed with "The Best of You" and released as a single in Australia on A&M K-8030 in September. It was a chart hit there, peaking at No. 60. The song would later appear in re-mix form on the VA album, Hot Classics, Issue 6 that was released on Hot Tracks – HC-6 in 1987.

A single, "You Got Me Spinning" bw "The Best of You" was released in New Zealand on A&M K 8946 in 1982. It was a hit there, spending a week in the chart, peaking at No. 44.

Another single, "Cookie" bw "Will You Be the One" was released on A&M 2279-S in October. It was one of the Billboard Top Single Picks for the week of 18 October. It also had a positive review in the 25 October issue of Record World.

==== Further activities ====
Jones released the single, "I Want You" bw "You're the Best". Credited to Booker T., it was released on A&M 2374-S in September 1981. He made the charts that year with the song. It debuted at No. 65 in the Record World Black Oriented Singles chart for the week of 7 November.

=== 1990s–2020s ===
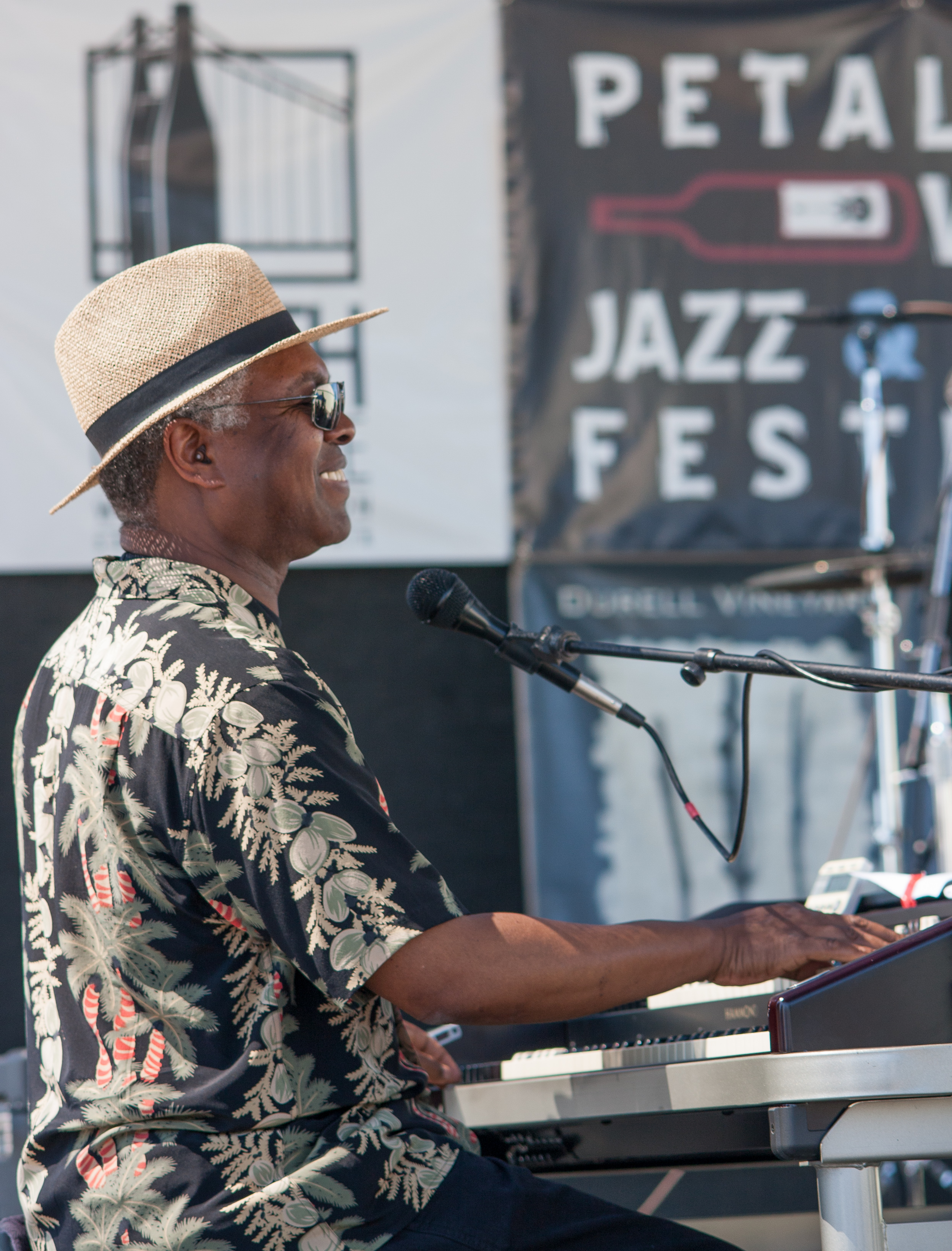
Booker T. playing organ at the Petaluma Wine, Jazz and Blues Festival, August 2009

In 2009 he released a new solo album, Potato Hole, recorded with the Drive-By Truckers, and featuring Neil Young. He performed at the Bonnaroo Music Festival with Drive-By Truckers on June 6, 2009, with a set including most tracks from Potato Hole as well as some Truckers tracks. On January 31, 2010, Potato Hole won the Best Instrumental Album award at the 52nd Annual Grammy Awards.

He is featured on the Rancid album Let the Dominoes Fall (2009), playing a Hammond B-3 on the track "Up to No Good".

Jones also played his B-3 on the track "If It Wasn't For Bad" from the Elton John and Leon Russell 2010 collaboration album titled The Union. The track was nominated at the 53rd Annual Grammy Awards for Best Pop Collaboration with Vocals.

In 2011, Jones released The Road from Memphis. The backing band included Questlove (drums), "Captain" Kirk Douglas (guitar) and Owen Biddle (bass) from the Roots as well as former Motown guitarist Dennis Coffey and percussionist Stewart Killen. The album features vocals by Yim Yames, Matt Berninger, Lou Reed, Sharon Jones and Booker T. himself, as well as lyrics contributed by his daughter/manager Liv Jones. Jones also recorded with party band the Gypsy Queens on their eponymous album.

On February 12, 2012, The Road from Memphis won at the 54th Annual Grammy Awards for Best Pop Instrumental Album. Jones holds a total of four Grammy Awards.

Jones received an honorary doctorate degree from Indiana University's Jacobs School of Music at its 2012 undergraduate commencement. Jones originally attended Indiana University in the 1960s, even staying after his smash-hit Stax Records recordings.

Jones was featured on organ for singer Kelly Hogan on Hogan's 2013 release on Anti-Records, I Like to Keep Myself in Pain.

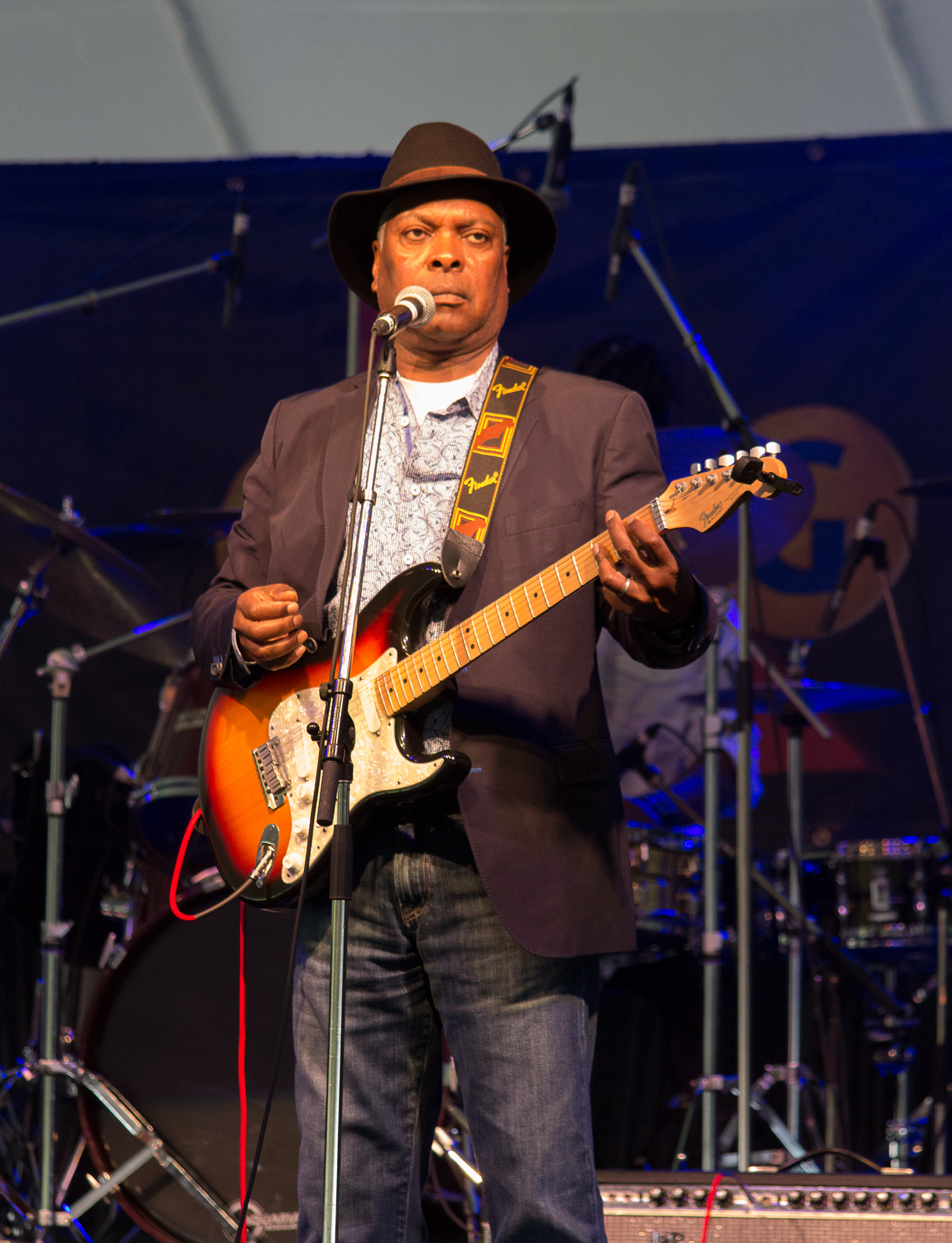
Booker T. playing guitar at Kitchener Bluesfest in 2013

In June 2013, Jones released his 10th album, Sound The Alarm, on Stax Records after originally leaving the label more than 40 years previously in 1971. The album features guest artists Anthony Hamilton, Raphael Saadiq, Jay James, Mayer Hawthorne, Estelle, Vintage Trouble, Gary Clark Jr., Luke James, and Booker's son Ted Jones. That summer, he performed at the TD Kitchener Blues Festival in Ontario.

On September 1, 2017, Jones performed live at the Royal Albert Hall BBC Proms with Jools Holland and his Rhythm & Blues Orchestra in a tribute concert honoring the 50th anniversary of Stax Records alongside Steve Cropper, Sam Moore, William Bell and British artists Beverley Knight, Ruby Turner, James Morrison and Tom Jones.

== Personal life ==
Jones was married to Priscilla Coolidge in 1969, sister of singer Rita Coolidge. He produced Priscilla's first album Gypsy Queen in 1970; then the pair collaborated as a duo on three albums: 1971's Booker T. & Priscilla, 1972's Home Grown, and 1973's Chronicles, and Jones produced Priscilla's final solo album, Flying, in 1979, right as their marriage ended that year. Jones is a member of Kappa Alpha Psi fraternity; he was initiated through the Alpha chapter at Indiana University.

== Legacy ==
On March 1, 1995, Booker T. & the MGs won their first Grammy Award for Best Pop Instrumental Performance for the song "Cruisin'". Jones still plays with the MGs and his own small combo called the Booker T. Jones Band. His current touring group includes Vernon "Ice" Black (guitar), Darian Gray (drums), and Melvin Brannon (bass).

Jones was inducted into The Rock and Roll Hall of Fame in 1992, and was honored with a Grammy Award for Lifetime Achievement on February 11, 2007.

In 2007, Jones was also inducted into the Musicians Hall of Fame and Museum in Nashville, Tennessee.

On October 29, 2019, his memoir Time Is Tight: My Life, Note by Note was released. The memoir was mentioned on NPR's Fresh Air on October 25, 2019.

== Solo discography ==
- Evergreen (1974)
- Try and Love Again (1978)
- The Best of You (1980)
- I Want You (1981)
- Runaway (1989)
- Potato Hole (2009)
- The Road from Memphis (2011)
- Sound the Alarm (2013)
- Note by Note (2019)

== Collaborations ==
with Carlos Santana

- Havana Moon (1983)

With Priscilla Coolidge

- Booker T. & Priscilla (1971)
- Home Grown (1972)
- Chronicles (1973)

With Otis Redding

- Pain in My Heart (1964)
- The Great Otis Redding Sings Soul Ballads (1965)
- Otis Blue: Otis Redding Sings Soul (1965)
- The Soul Album (1966)
- Complete & Unbelievable: The Otis Redding Dictionary of Soul (1966)
- King & Queen (1967)
- The Dock of the Bay (1968)

With Sheryl Crow

- Home for Christmas (2008)

With Eddie Floyd

- Knock on Wood (1967)

With Willie Nelson

- Stardust (1978)
- Pretty Paper (1979)
- Without a Song (1983)
- Island in the Sea (1987)

With Levon Helm

- Levon Helm & the RCO All-Stars (1977)

With Soul Asylum

- Grave Dancers Union (1992)

With Taylor Dayne

- Soul Dancing (1993)

With Albert King

- Born Under a Bad Sign (1967)

With Rosanne Cash

- Seven Year Ache (1981)

With Rod Stewart

- A Night on the Town (1976)

With William Bell

- The Soul of a Bell (1967)

With LeAnn Rimes

- Today Is Christmas (2015)

With Mickey Thomas

- As Long as You Love Me (1977)

With Rita Coolidge

- Rita Coolidge (1971)
- The Lady's Not for Sale (1972)
- Fall into Spring (1974)
- It's Only Love (1975)
- Anytime...Anywhere (1977)
- Love Me Again (1978)
- Satisfied (1979)

With Bill Withers

- Just as I Am (1971)

With Natalie Cole

- Good to Be Back (1989)

With Linda Ronstadt

- Feels Like Home (1995)

With Richie Havens

- The End of the Beginning (1976)

With John Lee Hooker

- Mr. Lucky (1991)
- Chill Out (1995)

With Elton John and Leon Russell

- The Union (2010)

With Neil Young

- Are You Passionate? (2002)

With Shawn Colvin

- Fat City (1992)

With Boz Scaggs

- Some Change (1994)

With Rodney Crowell

- Rodney Crowell (1981)
- Street Language (1986)
- Life Is Messy (1992)

With Steve Perry

- Traces "No More Cryin" (2018)

With Hozier

- Wasteland, Baby! (2019)

With Matt Berninger

- Serpentine Prison (2020)

== Current lineup ==
- Booker T. Jones – keyboards
- Ted Jones – guitar
- Melvin Brannon Jr. a.k.a. M-Cat Spoony – bass
- Darian Gray – drums
