= Tender Love =

Single by Force MDs

from the album Krush Groove and Chillin'
- B-side: "Be Mine, Girl"
- Released: November 20, 1985
- Genre: R&B; pop
- Length: 3:56 (album version); 4:19 (alternate single version)
- Label: Tommy Boy; Warner Bros.
- Songwriter: Jimmy Jam and Terry Lewis
- Producers: Jimmy Jam and Terry Lewis

Force MDs singles chronology
"Itchin' for a Scratch" (1985)	"Tender Love" (1985)	"Here I Go Again" (1986)

"Tender Love" is a song by American R&B group Force MDs, taken from their second studio album, Chillin' (1985). Written and produced by Jimmy Jam and Terry Lewis, the track appears in the film Krush Groove (1985), and was featured on the film's soundtrack.

== Background ==
Although primarily known as a pre-new jack swing/old school hip hop band, the Force MDs introduced themselves to a whole new audience with this song. Not only did the song reach number 4 on the R&B charts (where the group had already amassed a steady string of minor hits), but it also became a crossover hit, cracking the top ten on the Billboard Hot 100 in the spring of 1986, becoming the group's only single to date to break the Pop top 40. On the Adult Contemporary chart, the song peaked at number 2. The song was also a hit in the United Kingdom, reaching number 23 in the UK Singles Chart.

== Charts ==
=== Weekly charts ===
Chart (1986)	Peak position
UK Singles Chart (OCC)	23
US Billboard Hot 100	10
US Adult Contemporary (Billboard)	2
US Hot Black Singles (Billboard)	4

=== Year-end charts ===
Chart (1986)	Rank
US Top Pop Singles (Billboard)	95

== Notable covers ==
"Tender Love" has been covered by numerous artists. The most widely known version was by English singer Kenny Thomas which reached number 26 on the UK Singles Chart, number nine on the UK Airplay Chart and number 34 on the UK Dance Singles chart in 1991.
