= Rita Coolidge =

American singer (born 1945)

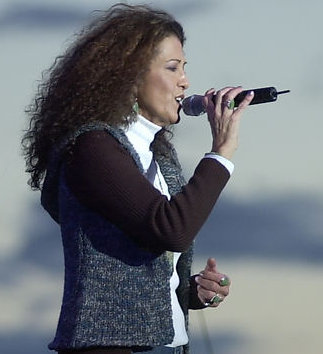
- Coolidge performing at an outdoor concert in Seattle in September 2002

Background information
- Born: May 1, 1945 (age 81); Lafayette, Tennessee, U.S.
- Genres: R&B; pop; rock; country; jazz; folk
- Occupations: Singer; songwriter
- Instruments: Vocals; piano
- Years active: 1969–present
- Labels: A&M; Monument; Attic; Alpha; Pony Canyon; Concord
- Spouse(s): Kris Kristofferson (m. 1973; div. 1980) Tatsuya Suda (m. 2004; div. 2012) Joe Hutto (m. 2018)
- Website: www.ritacoolidge.com

Rita Coolidge (born May 1, 1945) is an American singer and recording artist. During the 1970s and 1980s, her songs were on Billboard magazine's pop, country, adult contemporary, and jazz charts, and she won two Grammy Awards with fellow musician and then-husband Kris Kristofferson. Her recordings include "(Your Love Keeps Lifting Me) Higher and Higher", "We're All Alone", "I'd Rather Leave While I'm in Love" and the theme song for the 1983 James Bond film Octopussy: "All Time High".

== Life and career ==
=== Early life ===
Coolidge was born in Lafayette, Tennessee on May 1, 1945. She is the daughter of Dick and Charlotte Coolidge, a minister and schoolteacher, with sisters Linda and Priscilla, and brother Raymond. Coolidge's father was Cherokee, and her mother was half Cherokee and half Scottish. However, the Coolidge family was never enrolled in any Native American tribe. She attended Nashville's Maplewood High School and was graduated from Andrew Jackson Senior High School in Jacksonville, Florida. Coolidge is a graduate of Florida State University, and a member of Alpha Gamma Delta sorority.

=== Early career ===
After singing around Memphis (including a stint singing jingles), Coolidge was discovered by Delaney & Bonnie Bramlett, who worked with her in Los Angeles. There, she became a backing singer for artists including Leon Russell, Joe Cocker, Harry Chapin, Bob Dylan, Jimi Hendrix, Eric Clapton, Dave Mason, Graham Nash, and Stephen Stills. She was featured in Joe Cocker's Mad Dogs and Englishmen tour and album, singing Russell's and Bonnie Bramlett's song "Superstar". Coolidge did not receive songwriting credits for "Superstar" which later became a hit for The Carpenters.

She became known as "The Delta Lady" and inspired Russell to write a song of the same name for her.

=== "Layla" ===
Coolidge also did not receive songwriting credits for the coda of the 1971 single "Layla" by Eric Clapton's band Derek and the Dominos. In 2016, Coolidge stated that she recorded a demo with her boyfriend, the band's drummer Jim Gordon, before they went to England to record with Clapton. Once they met with Clapton, Coolidge played the piece she composed for him and she gave him a cassette. Clapton, impressed by the piece, used it as part of the song in the ending section which she found out by hearing the song over a PA system a year later. She tried to contact Clapton, but was told by his manager Robert Stigwood, "What are you gonna do? You're a girl. You don't have money to fight this. Let it go." She has not heard from Clapton himself but believes he is aware of the situation.

Though only Gordon has been officially credited with writing the section, the band's keyboardist Bobby Whitlock said:

Jim took that piano melody from his ex-girlfriend, Rita Coolidge. I know because in the Delaney & Bonnie days, I lived in John Garfield's old house in the Hollywood Hills and there was a guest house with an upright piano in it. Rita and Jim were up there in the guest house and invited me to join in on writing this song with them called "Time". … Her sister Priscilla wound up recording it with her husband, Booker T. Jones. … Jim took the melody from Rita's song and didn't give her credit for writing it. Her boyfriend ripped her off. I knew but nobody would listen to or believe me. I have told this story for years.

"Time" ended up on the 1973 album Chronicles by Booker T. and Priscilla.

=== Kris Kristofferson ===
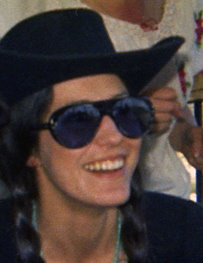
Coolidge at Willie Nelson's 4th of July Picnic in 1972

In November 1970, she met Kris Kristofferson at the Los Angeles airport when they were both catching the same flight to Tennessee. Instead of continuing to his intended destination in Nashville, he got off in Memphis with her. The two married in 1973, had a child in 1974, and recorded several duet albums, which sold well and earned the duo a Grammy Award for Best Country Performance by a Duo or Group with Vocal in 1974 for "From the Bottle to the Bottom", and in 1976 for "Lover Please".

She also had a credited role as Maria in the Sam Peckinpah directed Western film Pat Garrett and Billy the Kid in 1973, where Kristofferson played the role of Billy the Kid.

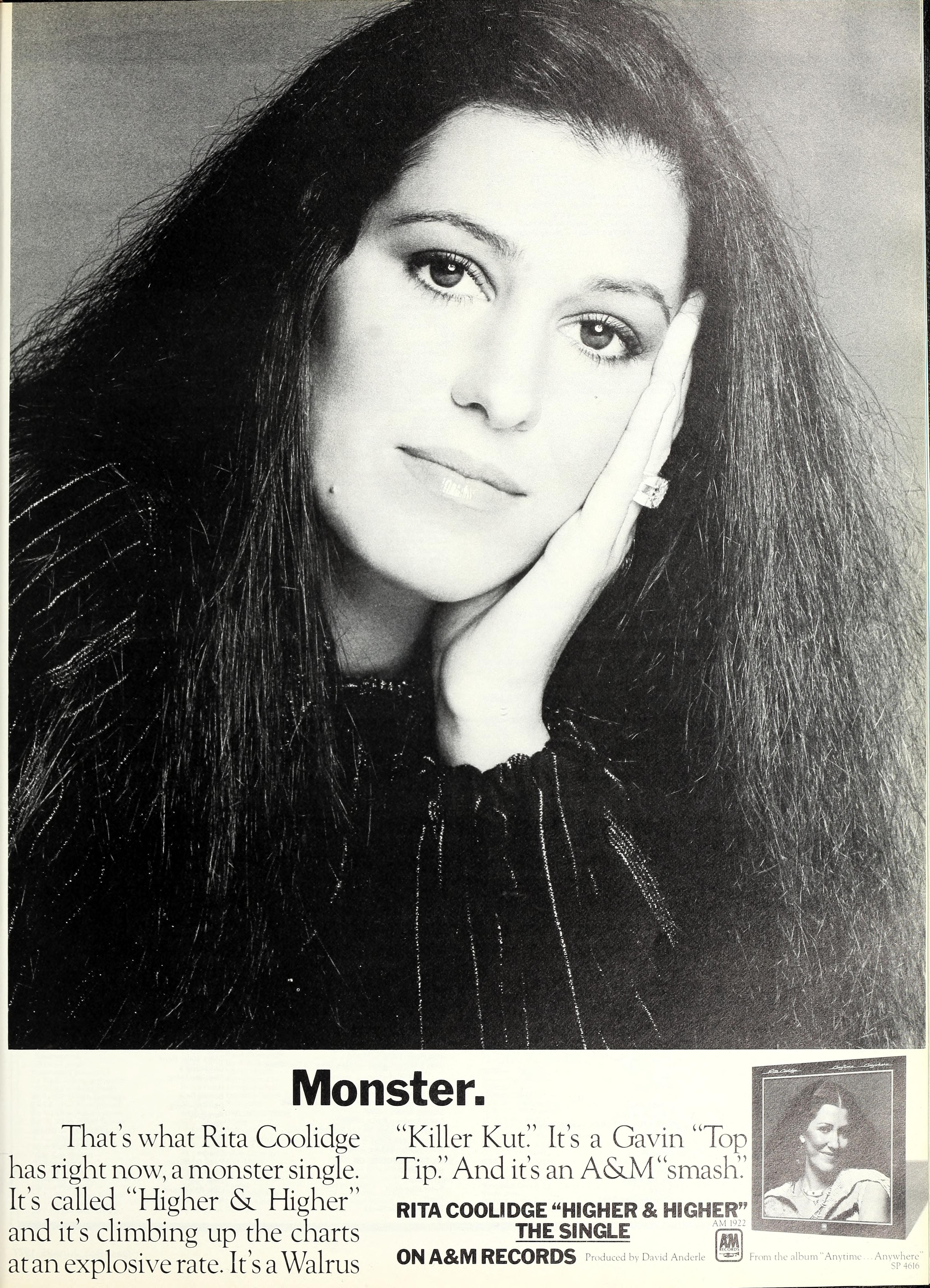
Cashbox advertisement, June 25, 1977

Coolidge's greatest success on the pop charts came during 1977–1978 with four consecutive top 25 hits, covers of Jackie Wilson's "(Your Love Keeps Lifting Me) Higher and Higher", Boz Scaggs's "We're All Alone", the Temptations' "The Way You Do The Things You Do", and Marcia Hines's "You". Coolidge and Kristofferson divorced in June 1980.

=== Later career ===
Working with Booker T. Jones", Coolidge recorded "We Could Stay Together" which was credited to both of them. It was backed with "The Best of You" and released as a single in Australia on A&M K-8030 in September. It was a chart hit there, peaking at No. 60.

In 1992, Coolidge sang joint lead vocals with Roger Waters on the title track of his album Amused to Death.

She also was among the first hosts on VH1, a US cable network. In 2006, she recorded a standards album, And So Is Love, with artwork by Clifford Bailey.

=== Walela ===
In 1997, Coolidge was one of the founding members of Walela, a Native American music trio, that also included her sister Priscilla and Priscilla's daughter Laura Satterfield. The trio released studio albums in 1997 (Walela) and 2000 (Unbearable Love), a live album and DVD (Live in Concert) in 2004 and a compilation album (The Best of Walela) in 2007.

Walela means "hummingbird" in the Cherokee language. The trio performed at the 1996 Summer Olympics in Atlanta.

=== Books ===
Her autobiography, Delta Lady: A Memoir, was published in April 2016.

== Personal life ==
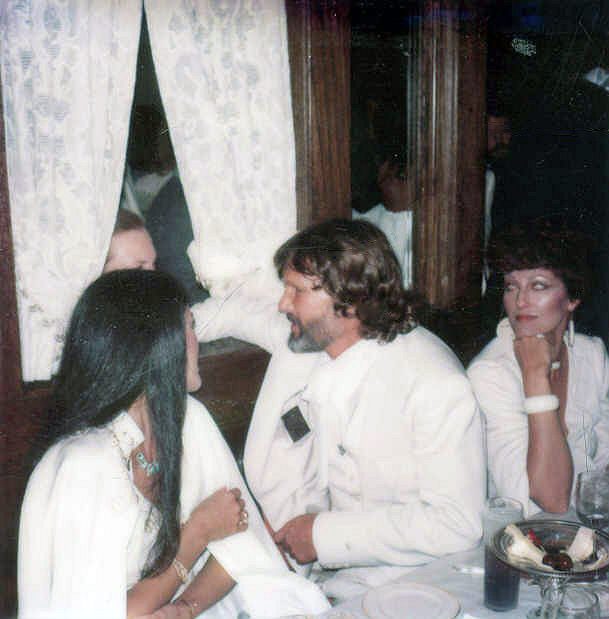
Coolidge with Kris Kristofferson at the private party after the premiere of the movie A Star Is Born, on the third floor of Dillon's Disco, Westwood, Los Angeles, on December 18, 1976

Coolidge had lived in Fallbrook, California, where she painted and exhibited her artwork until 2017.

=== Relationships ===
Coolidge had romantic liaisons with Stephen Stills and Graham Nash. Coolidge leaving Stills for Nash has been cited as a contributing factor behind the initial 1970 breakup of Crosby, Stills, Nash & Young. She was the "sweet little Indian girl" named "Raven" in the song "Cowboy Movie" on David Crosby's album If I Could Only Remember My Name.

Coolidge was also involved with Leon Russell and Joe Cocker. During the Mad Dogs & Englishmen tour, Coolidge's boyfriend at the time, Jim Gordon, assaulted her, resulting in a black eye for the rest of the tour. Coolidge ended the relationship and never spoke to him again. Gordon was later diagnosed with schizophrenia and convicted of murdering his mother.

Coolidge was married to Kris Kristofferson from 1973 to 1980. Their daughter, her only child, was born in 1974. Their marriage deteriorated after she miscarried her second child in 1977. In her memoir, Delta Lady, Coolidge described her marriage to Kristofferson as volatile due to his alcoholism and infidelity. She revealed he was also emotionally abusive and would belittle her talent. When they divorced she did not ask him for anything. However, in 2016 Coolidge told People that she and Kristofferson still shared a bond.

Coolidge married Tatsuya Suda, a computer architecture researcher, on June 19, 2004, in the Cook Islands. Suda, a Japanese citizen, retired in 2010 after a long tenure as a professor at the Donald Bren School of Information and Computer Sciences (UC Irvine), when allegations of professional misconduct against him surfaced. Coolidge divorced Suda in 2012. In 2014, he pleaded guilty to a felony charge of receiving illegal payments.

In 2017, Coolidge rekindled a romantic relationship with Joe Hutto, a former college boyfriend. They married in 2018 and moved back to Tallahassee.

=== Family ===
In October 2014, Coolidge's sister, Priscilla, was murdered by her husband, Michael Siebert, in a murder-suicide. The pain of that loss was exacerbated when Siebert's ashes were delivered to Rita's home and she had to dispose of them.

== Awards and nominations ==
Coolidge was inducted into the Southern Museum of Music Hall of Fame in 2015.

=== Grammy Awards ===
Coolidge has won two Grammy Awards from her three nominations.

Year	Nominee / work	Award	Result
1974	"From the Bottle to the Bottom"	Best Country Vocal Performance by a Duo or Group	Won
1975	"Loving Arms"	Best Country Vocal Performance by a Duo or Group	Nominated
1976	"Lover Please"	Best Country Vocal Performance by a Duo or Group	Won

== Discography ==
- Rita Coolidge (1971)
- Nice Feelin' (1971)
- The Lady's Not for Sale (1972)
- Fall into Spring (1974)
- It's Only Love (1975)
- Anytime...Anywhere (1977)
- Love Me Again (1978)
- Satisfied (1979)
- Heartbreak Radio (1981)
- Never Let You Go (1983)
- Dancing with an Angel (1991)

Preceded by Sheena Easton; For Your Eyes Only, 1981	James Bond title artist Octopussy ("All Time High"), 1983	Succeeded by Duran Duran; A View to a Kill, 1985
