= Nalle Colt =

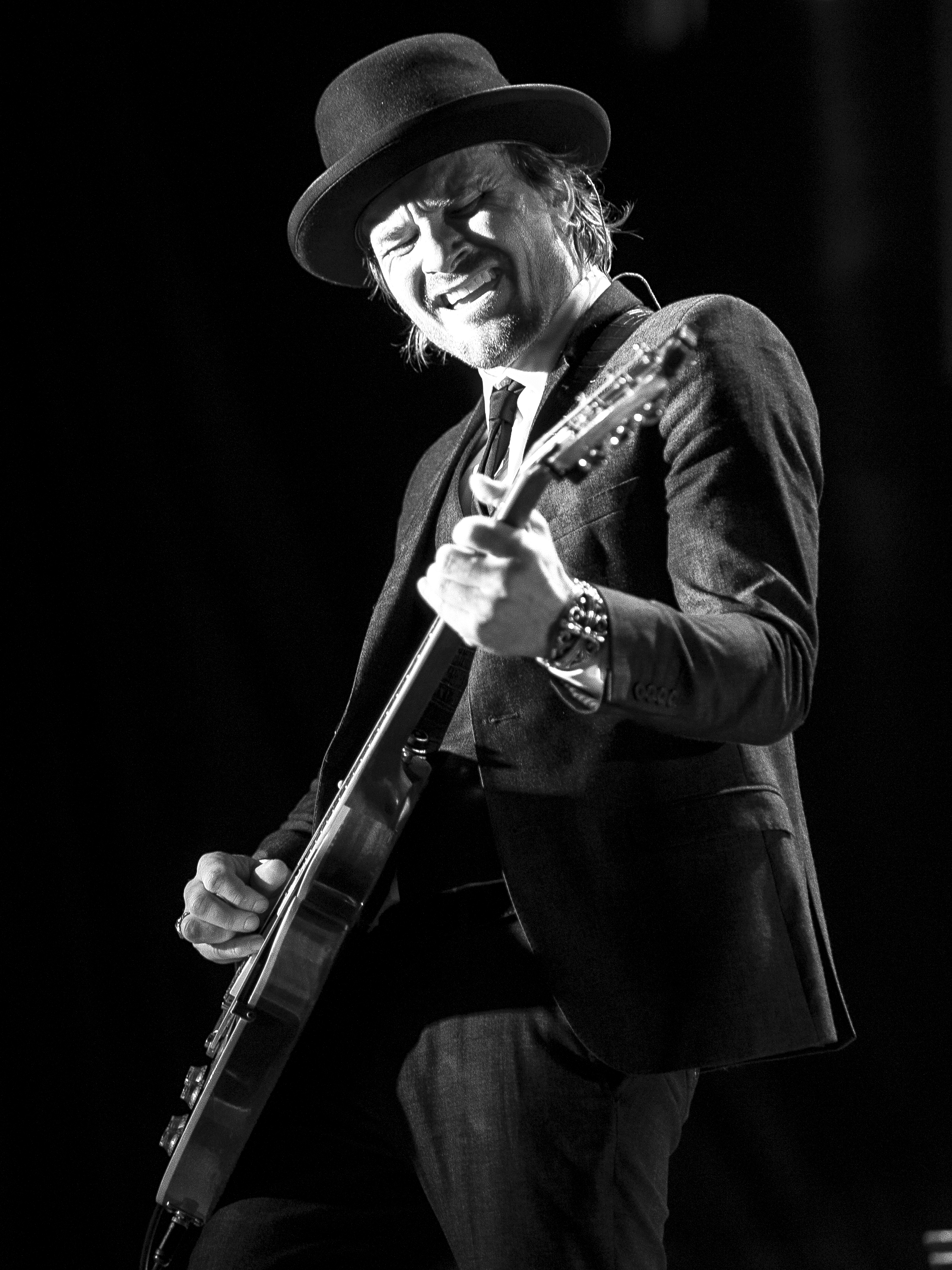
- Colt in 2014

Background information
- Born: Nalle Colt
- Origin: Malmö, Sweden
- Genres: Rock, rhythm & blues
- Occupations: Musician, guitarist
- Instruments: Guitar, vocals, composer
- Years active: 2010s
- Labels: Blue Note Records
- Website: http://www.vintagetrouble.com

Nalle Colt is a Swedish guitarist and resident studio musician, best known as the lead guitarist in the Los Angeles based rhythm & blues band, Vintage Trouble. Colt was born in Malmö, Sweden. As a child, he was a skateboarding prodigy, competing on a professional level. After an injury left him bed-ridden, he learned to play guitar at the age of 13. Colt cites his early musical influences as The Beatles, Jimi Hendrix, and Led Zeppelin.

== Music career ==
Colt played with Ty Taylor in the band Ghost Hounds before forming Vintage Trouble with Rick Barrio Dill and Richard Danielson in 2010.

Vintage Trouble has supported artists including Joss Stone, Paloma Faith, the Dixie Chicks, The Who, Lenny Kravitz, Bon Jovi, and AC/DC on their 2015 Rock or Bust World Tour.

Colt has also played with 2 Cent Penny, 6 Foot Nurse.

== Discography ==
- 2019 Chapter II - EP II / Vintage Trouble / Guitar, Vocals
- 2018 Chapter II - EP I / Vintage Trouble / Guitar, Vocals
- 2015 1 Hopeful Rd. / Vintage Trouble / Guitar, Vocals
- 2014 The Swing House Acoustic Sessions / Vintage Trouble / Guitar, Vocals
- 2013 Sound the Alarm / Booker T. Jones / Composer, Guitar
- 2011 The Bomb Shelter Sessions / Vintage Trouble Composer, Guitar, Vocals
- 2010 Little Immaculate White Fox / Pearl Aday / Composer, Lyricist, Guitar
- 2007 The Winding Road / Engelbert Humperdinck / Guitar (Electric)

== Equipment ==
Colt is endorsed by Fender Guitars, Taylor Guitars, D'Addario, Schaffer Replica-Solo Dallas, Lazy J Amplifier, Mogami Cable and Clayton Guitar Picks.
