= Rock Candy Funk Party Takes New York: Live at the Iridium =

Live album by Rock Candy Funk Party
- Released: February 25, 2014
- Genre: Jazz Fusion
- Length: 103:06
- Label: J&R Adventures (USA); Provogue (Worldwide)
- Producer: Tal Bergman

Rock Candy Funk Party chronology
We Want Groove (2013)	Rock Candy Funk Party Takes New York: Live at the Iridium (2014)	Groove Is King (2015)

Rock Candy Funk Party Takes New York: Live at the Iridium is the live album by American jazz and funk group Rock Candy Funk Party. It was released on February 25, 2014 through J&R Adventures.

== Track listing ==
All tracks written by Tal Bergman / Joe Bonamassa / Ron DeJesus / Michael Merritt / Renato Neto unless indicated

No.	Title	Length
1.	"Octopus-e"	7:09
2.	"Work"	7:27
3.	"We Want Groove"	7:28
4.	"Heartbeat"	8:30
5.	"New York Song"	6:19
6.	"Spaztastic"	7:44
7.	"Ode to Gee"	10:10
8.	"Dope on a Rope"	5:03
9.	"Best Ten Minutes of Your Life"	10:27
10.	"Steppin' in It"	8:06
11.	"Mr Clean"	11:55
12.	"One Phone Call"	15:58
Total length:		103:06

== Charts ==
Chart (2014)	Peak position
US Top Jazz Albums (Billboard)	29
