= Sound the Alarm (Booker T. Jones album) =

Studio album by Booker T
- Released: June 25, 2013
- Studios: RedStar (Silverlake, CA); The Village Studios (Los Angeles, CA); East West (Hollywood, CA); Skip Saylor Recording (Northridge, CA)
- Genres: R&B; soul
- Length: 47:28
- Label: Stax
- Producers: Booker T. Jones; Jared Gosselin; Jimmy Jam and Terry Lewis; The Avila Brothers

Booker T chronology
The Road from Memphis (2011)	Sound the Alarm (2013)	Note By Note (2019)

Professional ratings
Review scores
Source	Rating
AllMusic	3/5 stars
Financial Times	3/5 stars
Los Angeles Times	3/4 stars
musicOMH	3/5 stars
Now	3/5 Ns
Record Collector	4/5 stars
The Arts Desk	4/5 stars
The Guardian	4/5 stars
The Observer	3/5 stars
Uncut	4/5 stars

Sound the Alarm is the eighth solo studio album by American musician Booker T. Jones. It was released on June 25, 2013 via Stax Records. Recording sessions took place at RedStar in Silverlake, The Village Studios in Los Angeles, East West in Hollywood and Skip Saylor Recording in Northridge. Production was handled by Jones himself together with the Avila Brothers, Jimmy Jam, Terry Lewis, Jared Gosselin, and additional vocal producer Sam Salter. It features guest appearances from Anthony Hamilton, Estelle, Jay James, Kori Withers, Luke James, Mayer Hawthorne, Poncho Sanchez, Sheila E., Ted Jones, Vintage Trouble and Gary Clark Jr.

In the United Kingdom, the album peaked at number 86 on the UK Albums Chart and number 8 on the Official UK Hip Hop and R&B Charts.

== Track listing ==
No.	Title	Writer(s)	Producer(s)	Length
1.	"Sound the Alarm" (featuring Mayer Hawthorne)	Booker T. Jones; Bobby Ross Avila; Issiah J. Avila	The Avila Brothers; Booker T. Jones	3:51
2.	"All Over the Place" (featuring Luke James)	Jones; B. Avila; I. Avila; Terry Lewis	The Avila Brothers; Jimmy Jam and Terry Lewis; Sam Salter (a.v.p.)	3:29
3.	"Fun"	Jones; B. Avila; I. Avila	The Avila Brothers	2:53
4.	"Broken Heart" (featuring Jay James)	Jones; B. Avila; I. Avila; Lewis	The Avila Brothers; Jimmy Jam and Terry Lewis; Sam Salter (a.v.p.)	3:19
5.	"Feel Good"	Jones; B. Avila; I. Avila	The Avila Brothers; Sam Salter (a.v.p.)	3:24
6.	"Gently" (featuring Anthony Hamilton)	Jones; Anthony Hamilton; B. Avila; I. Avila	The Avila Brothers	3:08
7.	"Austin City Blues" (featuring Gary Clark Jr.)			5:12
8.	"Can't Wait" (featuring Estelle)	Jones; B. Avila; I. Avila; Charles Ray Wiggins; Ben Lakey	The Avila Brothers	3:37
9.	"66 Impala" (featuring Poncho Sanchez and Sheila E.)	Jones; B. Avila; I. Avila	The Avila Brothers	3:55
10.	"Watch You Sleeping" (featuring Kori Withers)	Jones	Booker T. Jones; The Avila Brothers	3:55
11.	"Your Love Is No Love" (featuring Vintage Trouble)	Jones; Ty Taylor; Nalle Colt; Richard Danielson; Rick Barrio Dill	Booker T. Jones	4:55
12.	"Father Son Blues" (featuring Ted Jones)	Jones	Booker T. Jones; Jared Gosselin	5:50
Total length:				47:28

== Charts ==
Chart (2013)	Peak position
UK Albums (Official Charts)	86
UK R&B Albums (Official Charts)	8
