= The Groove Cubed =

Studio album by Rock Candy Funk Party
- Released: October 20, 2017
- Genre: Jazz fusion
- Length: 58:22
- Label: J&R Adventures (USA); Provogue (Worldwide)
- Producer: Tal Bergman

Rock Candy Funk Party chronology
Groove Is King (2015)	The Groove Cubed (2017)

The Groove Cubed is the third studio album by American jazz and funk group Rock Candy Funk Party. It was released on October 20, 2017, through J&R Adventures. The album features Ty Taylor from Vintage Trouble and Mahalia Barnes as guest vocalists.

== Track listing ==
All tracks written by Tal Bergman / Joe Bonamassa / Ron DeJesus / Michael Merritt unless indicated.

No.	Title	Writer(s)	Length
1.	"Gothic Orleans"		1:47
2.	"Drunk on Bourbon on Bourbon Street"		4:48
3.	"In the Groove"		6:52
4.	"Don't Even Try It"		3:45
5.	"Two Guys and Stanley Kubrick Walk into a Jazz Club"		4:19
6.	"Isle of the Wright Brothers"		0:59
7.	"Mr. Space"		5:50
8.	"I Got the Feelin'"	James Brown	4:38
9.	"After Hours"		2:30
10.	"This Tune Should Run for President"		5:20
11.	"Mr. Funkadamus Returns and He Is Mad"		2:42
12.	"Funk-o-potamia"		6:29
13.	"The Token Ballad"		4:48
14.	"Ping Pong"		3:27
Total length:			58:22
