= Rick Barrio Dill =

American musician

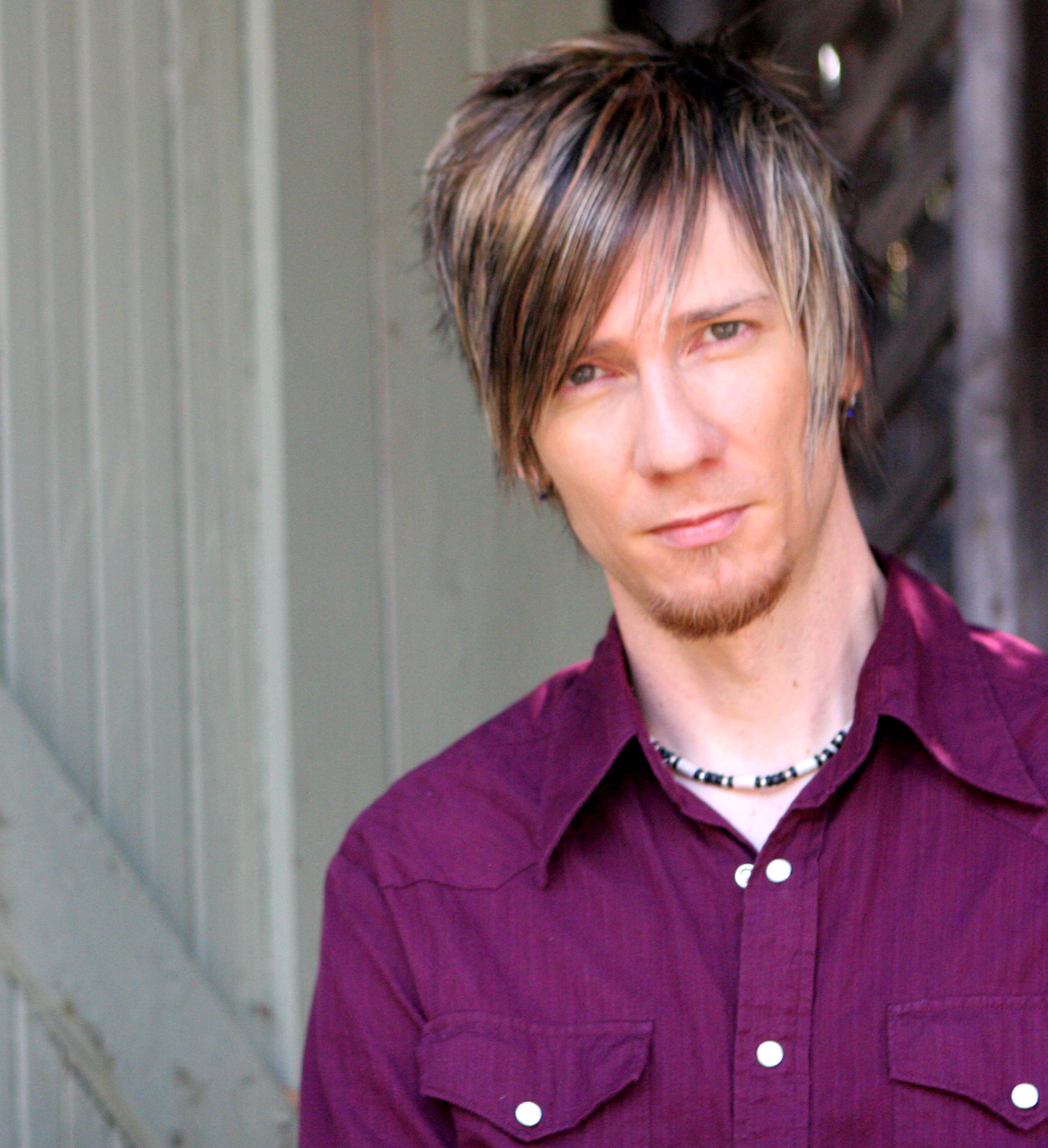

Background information
- Born: Richard Andrew Dill
- Origin: Tampa, Florida, US
- Genres: Soul, Rock, Funk, R&B, Pop
- Occupations: musician, bass guitarist, producer, recording engineer, multi-instrumentalist, writer
- Years active: 1989–present
- Labels: Independent
- Website: http://www.vintagetrouble.com http://www.rickbarriodill.com<

Rick Barrio Dill is an American musician. He has performed, engineered and produced under the names Rick Dill, Keylow D, RBD and Rick Barrio Dill. Currently, he is an active member of the band Vintage Trouble. He has also been a member of 2nd Day Crush and The Ty Taylor Review. Barrio Dill is also a frequent freelance contributing writer for Recording Magazine. He lives in Los Angeles.

== Early life ==
Born Richard Andrew Dill in Tampa, Florida, he spent his formative years in the nearby town of Brandon, Florida but also spent a great deal of time in Miami. Dill attended both Bloomingdale Senior High School and Brandon High School, graduating from the latter. He went on to graduate from the University of South Florida, majoring in Business Marketing with an emphasis on Music Theory.

== Musical interests ==
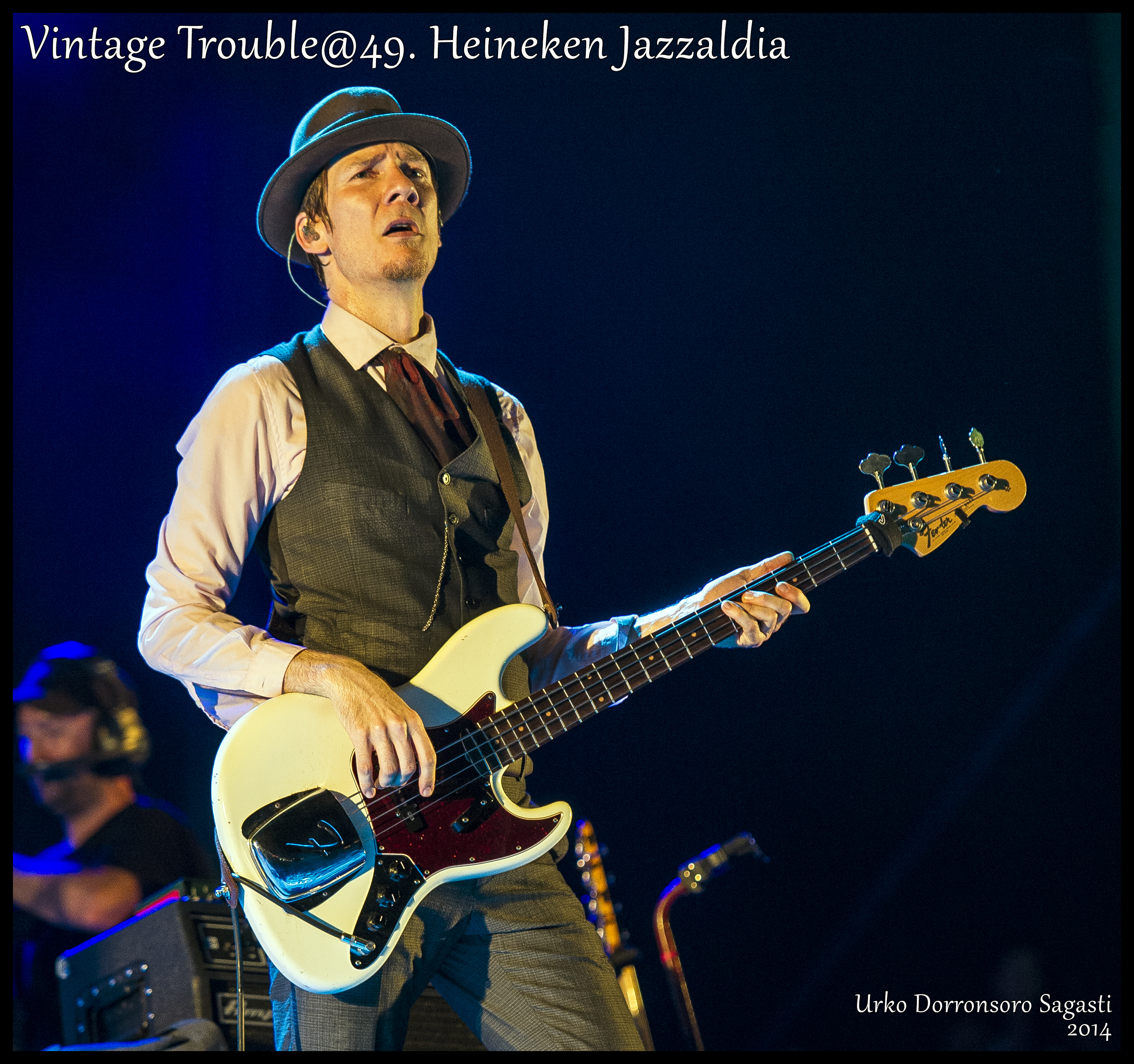
Dill with Vintage Trouble in 2014

Dill took music as an interest early on in life and Dill's parents recall that he picked up his first guitar when he was 7 and taught himself the chords to The Beatles' "Let It Be". His musical growth was supported by a home filled with the sounds of records, and Dill remembers being influenced by his parents music collection. This collection included early rock such as The Beatles and The Rolling Stones as well as Tom Jones, the Bee Gees and southern rock from the likes of Bob Seger and Lynyrd Skynyrd. His first musical instrument was a recorder, then a violin, and was soon followed by the electric guitar. He immediately started imitating legends Eddie Van Halen and Steve Vai. At age 16, Dill was exposed to Sly & The Family Stone, particularly the heavyweight bass guitar sounds of Larry Graham and shortly after, he became a bass player. At age 17, he discovered Prince, Motown Records and vintage soul. It was this early rhythm and blues and 1970s funk music that served as the catalyst for his growth as a bass guitarist. This is best reflected by his current musical project Vintage Trouble. He is the adopted godson of Jerry Martini, the founding member and tenor saxophone player of Sly & The Family Stone, who nicknamed him "Barely White" in reference to his deep soulful voice much akin to Barry White. Martini made live cameo appearances in early incarnations of Barrio Dill's rock/funk band Starbaby, as well as contributed tenor sax to the song "Lines Out" from an early Starbaby EP "Star Candy". Dill cites a myriad of influences on his musical style stating, "Prince, Bob Marley, and Motown created the air I breathe, the rest is just by-products" . He primarily plays the bass guitar, but is a skilled producer, composer, arranger, and recording engineer and is proficient on guitar and piano.

== Tampa to Los Angeles ==
Dill played in the local Tampa bands, Line-9 and Ramona Ramonster. After deciding to form his own band, he recruited Ramona Ramonster drummer Hugh Joe Murphy and Line-9 singer Mike Dornberger, and guitarist Kris Hawkins to form the rock/funk band Starbaby. With the band ready, Dill moved his recording studio to the unused side of Audio Lab Studios in Tampa. Here, he was reunited with whom he claims is his biggest studio and music mentor, Greg Marchak (Trans-Siberian Orchestra, Savatage). Marchak, an engineering and producing local, had actually recorded Dill's first ever demo many years before. The two then began working together in different capacities on a variety of local death metal, punk, hip-hop, rock and gospel projects. Dill also assisted Greg in the editing and engineering on many of the early writing sessions for Trans-Siberian Orchestra recordings and the Jon Oliva (Savatage, Jon Oliva's Pain) solo records. This union led to Marchak helping Barrio Dill co-produce and mix the Starbaby LP "Welcome to the Planet".

Upon the release of the LP, Barrio Dill, Dornberger, and Hawkins relocated to Los Angeles in 2003. Shortly thereafter, Dill met Christopher Drizen and the two formed the pop/rock band 2nd Day Crush. This band resulted in higher profile work with Jim Wirt (Incubus, Hoobastank, Nelly Furtado), as well as Michael Urbano (Smash Mouth), Jeff Saltzman (The Killers, Green Day, Nirvana) and Jason Carmer (The Donnas, Third Eye Blind). In the end, Dill decided to record and produce the 2nd Day Crush full-length record "From the Nights You Lost Your Voice" on his own. On September 6, 2007, while finishing the album, Barrio Dill learned his friend and mentor, Greg Marchak, had died suddenly of a brain aneurism. The album was dedicated to the memory of Marchak. A portion of each album sale goes to the Conservation International and Invisible Children charities.

Barrio Dill has remained active in the music community and has been involved in The Existents, an experimental musical theatre work-in-progress where he worked with Ty Taylor (Rock Star: INXS, Dakota Moon) and Broadway vocalist Eden Espinosa. Subsequently, he joined The Ty Taylor Revue before the project was put on hold while Ty joined The Ghosthounds (recorded with Nile Rodgers and Bob Clearmountain). In the meantime, Dill joined Interscope Records developmental band The Zodiac Show, where he played with Ty Taylor again, as well as, Adam Lambert (American Idol) and Carmit Bachar (Pussycat Dolls).

In the spring of 2010, Barrio Dill, Ty Taylor, Nalle Colt, and Richard Danielson joined forces to create the synergistic soul-rock anomaly known as Vintage Trouble. VT has since recorded 2 albums and recently signed with Doc McGhee (Mötley Crüe, Kiss, Bon Jovi, Guns N' Roses) Management. Additionally, their music was featured in a Honda commercial.

== Bands ==
=== Current bands ===
Vintage Trouble (2010–present)

- Ty Taylor (vocals)
- Nalle Colt (guitar)
- Richard Danielson (drums)

=== Former bands ===
2nd Day Crush (2004–2010)

- Chris Drizen (vocals, guitars)
- Rami Jrade (guitars)
- George Lind (drums)
- Jeremy Aric (guitars, vocals)

The Ty Taylor Review (2008–2010)

- Ty Taylor (vocals)
- Nalle Colt (guitars)
- Nick Hughes (drums)

The Zodiac Show/Band (Interscope) (2008–2010)

- Adam Lambert (American Idol)
- Ty Taylor (Rock Star: INXS, Dakota Moon)
- Carmit Bachar (The Pussycat Dolls)
- Brian Friedman (choreographer for Britney Spears, Prince)
- Alisan Porter
- Scarlett
- Rebel (rapper)
- Ameenah Kaplan (drums)
- Brian "London" Wiggins (keys)
- Adam Rapa (trumpet)
- Billy Jayne (lead guitar)
- Zandro Lotterte (Trumpet Player of the Banda Dose, Singalong, Salbag butu)

Ramona Hates Pink (1999–2001)

- Wes Styles (keyboard player for Coheed & Cambria)
- Hugh Joe Murphy (drums)

Starbaby (2001–2004)

- Hugh Joe Murphy (drums)
- Mike Dornberger (vocals)
- Kris Hawkins (guitars)

== Other work ==
RBD contributed significantly to Duff Ferguson's 2005 debut release 400 Miles as an engineer, bass guitar player, and also sang harmony vocals. On Ferguson's 2007 album Good Things he is a credited bass guitarist as well on three songs.

RBD appeared on Boston Legal Season 2 Episode 16 "Live Big" as a sideline musician/band leader on guitar. Original air date February 21, 2006.

Co-produced and engineered Tampa hip-hop group The Villanz with The Great LP, Episode One and Neighborhood Heroes (in development as of May 2009).

RBD has played bass in numerous shows with the Los Angeles-based Troubador Theatre Orchestra directed by Matt Walker. These shows have included, The Artist Formerly Known as Prince Hamlet of Denmark, Little Drummer Bowie, It's A Charlie James Brown Christmas, Much A Doobie Brothers About Nothing, Alice in One-Hit Wonderland, and OthE.L.O.

Producer, mixer and co-writer of electronic hip-hop project The Hi-Fidelity with Bradley Keys.

== Equipment ==
Dill is endorsed by Aguilar Amplification and Black Diamond Strings. He plays Sadowsky and Fender bass guitars.

== Discography ==
Vintage Trouble The Bomb Shelter Sessions LP (Co-Prod, Perf) 2010

Sugarwall Find A Way LP (Prod, Mix, Perf) 2009
2nd Day Crush From the Nights You Lost Your Voice (Prod, Eng, Perf) 2008
Scovill Avenue Big House (Bass, Eng, Mixer) on "Burn (I Want To") 2008
Duff Good Things LP (Bass) on "We Will Escape, Good Things and One Day at a Time" 2008
The Villanz The Rise of the Villanz – Episode 1 (Mix, Eng) 2007
2nd Day Crush 624 EP (Prod, Mix, Perf) 2006
Duff 400 Miles EP (Bass, Eng) 2005
Starbaby Welcome to the Planet (Prod, Eng, Mix, Perf) 2005
The Villanz Episode 1 LP (Mix, Eng, Co-prod) 2004
Di-Vine -feat. The Villanz The Great LP (Mix, Eng) 2003
I Alive I Alive LP (Edit, Mix, Addl. Vox) 2003
Four Star Riot The Best Things (ProTools Editing) 2003
Ramona Ramonster Impervious Nature LP (Bass) 1999
