= Rock Candy Funk Party =

American band

- Origin: Los Angeles, California
- Genres: Jazz; funk; rock; soul
- Years active: 2009–present
- Labels: J&R Adventures; Provogue
- Members: Tal Bergman; Joe Bonamassa; Ron DeJesus; Mike Merritt
- Website: rockcandyfunkparty.com

Rock Candy Funk Party is an American jazz-funk band from Los Angeles, California. It was formed in 2009 by drummer Tal Bergman and guitarist Ron DeJesus, who had previously released Grooove, Vol. 1 in 2007. After adding guitarist Joe Bonamassa, bassist Mike Merritt and keyboardist Renato Neto, the band released its debut album We Want Groove in 2013, which reached number 5 on the US Billboard Jazz Albums chart and number 6 on the UK Jazz & Blues Albums Chart. Percussionist Daniel Sadownick joined after the album's release, featuring on the band's first live album Rock Candy Funk Party Takes New York: Live at The Iridium in 2014.

In 2015, Rock Candy Funk Party released its second studio album Groove Is King, which featured additional contributions from musicians including trumpeter Randy Brecker, saxophonist Ada Rovatti and ZZ Top frontman Billy Gibbons. The album reached number 5 on the Billboard Jazz Albums chart and number 7 on the UK Jazz & Blues Albums Chart. The band released its third album The Groove Cubed in October 2017, which also features vocalists Ty Taylor and Mahalia Barnes.

== History ==
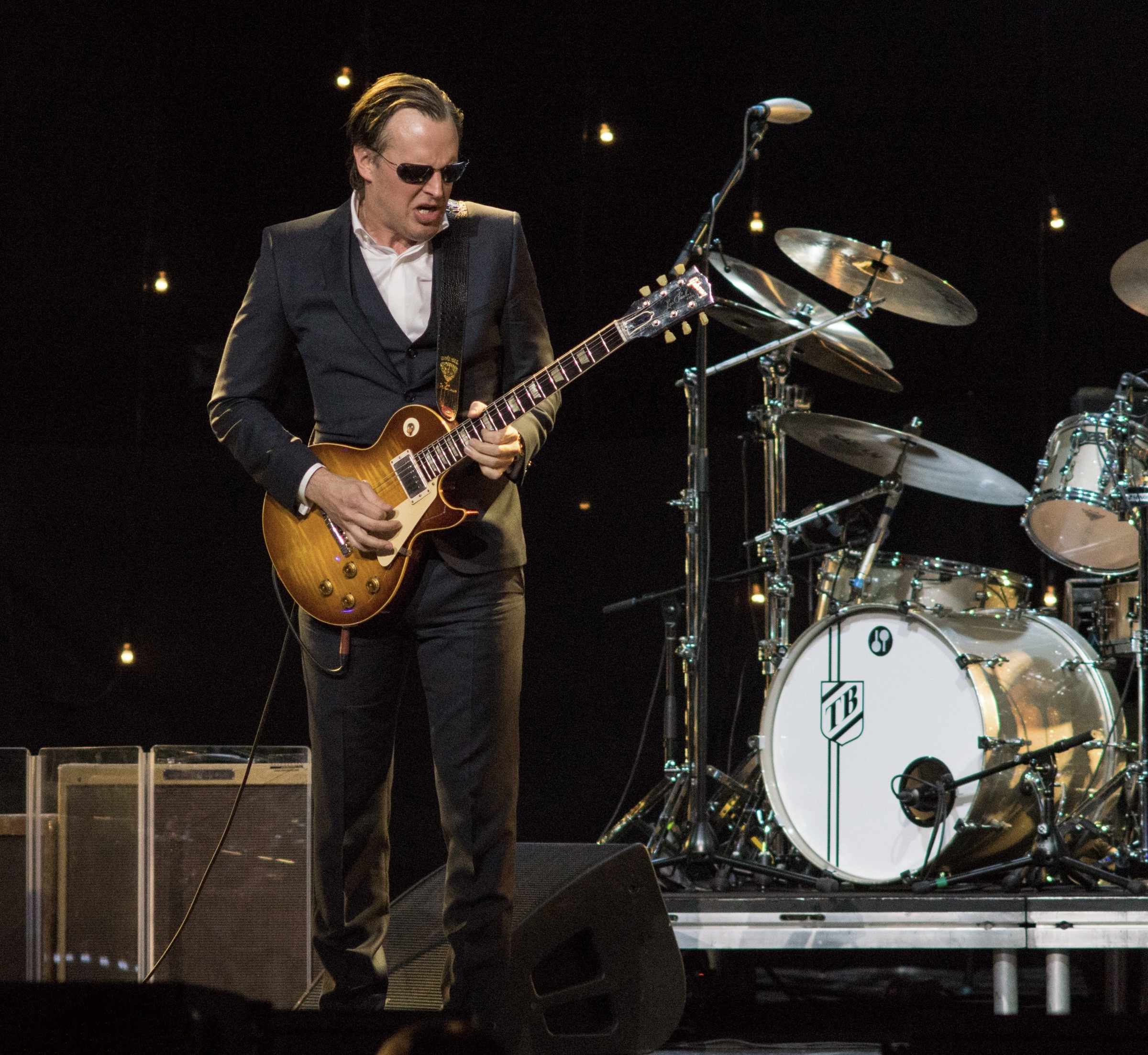
After enlisting Tal Bergman to his band in 2010, Joe Bonamassa joined Rock Candy Funk Party the following year.

Drummer Tal Bergman and guitarist Ron DeJesus first collaborated on the jazz/funk album Grooove, Vol. 1 in 2007, before performing a number of jam-based shows at Hollywood jazz club The Baked Potato with various guests. This led to the official formation of Rock Candy Funk Party "around 2009", with bassist Mike Merritt and keyboardist Renato Neto finalising the group's initial lineup. After Bergman joined the guitarist's band in 2010, Joe Bonamassa also joined Rock Candy Funk Party in 2011, performing for the first time with the group in early 2012. The band recorded its debut album We Want Groove at Bergman's own studio in Los Angeles later in the year, which was released on January 29, 2013. The album registered at number 5 on the US Billboard Jazz Albums chart, number 8 on the Heatseekers Albums chart, number 37 on the Independent Albums chart, number 6 on the UK Jazz & Blues Albums Chart, and number 41 on the UK Independent Albums Chart.

On February 25, 2014, the band released its first live album and video set Rock Candy Funk Party Takes New York: Live at the Iridium, which was recorded across three nights at the Iridium Jazz Club in New York City in June 2013. The album features percussionist Daniel Sadownick, who had been performing live with the group since earlier in the year. Live at the Iridium registered at number 29 on the Billboard Jazz Albums chart and number 14 on the UK Jazz & Blues Albums Chart. The group's second studio album Groove Is King followed on July 31, 2015, featuring contributions from Sadownick, trumpeter Randy Brecker, saxophonists Ada Rovatti and James Campagnola, and keyboardist Fred Kron, as well as appearances from Billy Gibbons (under the name "Mr. Funkadamus") as the master of ceremonies. The album reached number 5 on the Billboard Jazz Albums chart, number 22 on the Heatseekers Albums chart, and number 7 on the UK Jazz & Blues Albums Chart.

Rock Candy Funk Party released its third studio album The Groove Cubed on October 20, 2017, which features vocalists Ty Taylor and Mahalia Barnes on a song each. The Taylor-featured song, "Don't Even Try It", was released as the lead single from the album, with an accompanying music video, on September 29. The album reached number 5 on the Billboard and number 10 on the UK Jazz & Blues Albums Chart.

== Band members ==
Official members

- Tal Bergman – drums, percussion (2009–present)
- Ron DeJesus – guitar (2009–present)
- Joe Bonamassa – guitar (2011–present)
- Mike Merritt – bass (2009–present)

Other contributors

- Renato Neto – keyboards (all releases)
- Daniel Sadownick – percussion (Live at the Iridium and Groove Is King)
- Fred Kron – keyboards, string (Groove Is King)
- Ada Rovatti – saxophone (Groove Is King)
- James Campagnola – alto saxophone (Groove Is King)
- Randy Brecker – trumpet (Groove Is King)
- Zia – vocals (Groove Is King – "Digging in the Dirt" only)
- Ty Taylor – vocals (The Groove Cubed – "Don't Even Try It" only)
- Mahalia Barnes – vocals (The Groove Cubed – "I Got the Feelin'" only)

== Discography ==
=== Studio albums ===
List of studio albums, with selected chart positions
Title	Album details	Peak chart positions									
Title	Album details	US Heat.	US Indie	US Jazz	BEL (Fla.)	BEL (Wal.)	FRA	NED	UK Indie	UK Indie Break.	UK Jazz
We Want Groove	Released: January 29, 2013; Label: J&R Adventures/Provogue; Formats: CD+DVD, 2LP, DL	8	37	5	—	—	112	—	41	11	6
Groove Is King	Released: July 31, 2015; Label: J&R Adventures/Provogue; Formats: CD+DVD, 2LP, DL	22	—	5	137	132	—	79	—	—	7
The Groove Cubed	Released: October 20, 2017; Label: J&R Adventures/Provogue; Formats: CD, 2LP, DL	—	—	5	—	—	—	—	—	—	10

=== Live albums ===
List of live albums, with selected chart positions
Title	Album details	Peaks	
Title	Album details	US Jazz	UK Jazz
Rock Candy Funk Party Takes New York: Live at the Iridium	Released: February 25, 2014; Label: J&R Adventures/Provogue; Formats: 2CD+DVD, 2CD+BD, DL	29	14
