= A Place to Land =

A Place to Land may refer to:

- A Place to Land (Dakota Moon album), released in 2002
- A Place to Land (Little Big Town album), released in 2007 and re-released in 2008
