= Frederick Hutson =

Frederick Hutson is an American businessman and founder of Pigeonly, a technology company that enables people to search, find and communicate with an incarcerated loved one. Hutson launched and sold his first business at the age of 19 while on active duty in the United States Air Force.

== Early life ==
Frederick Hutson grew up in Brooklyn, NY with a single mother and three siblings. He moved to St. Petersburg, Florida, where he attended Brandon High School. He then served in the US Air Force where he worked on jet engines at the Nellis Air Force Base as an electrician. During his time in the Air Force he launched and ran several businesses, including a window-tinting business that made about $50,000 when he was 19. He was honorably discharged in 2005 after the base began downsizing, and eventually turned his business efforts to sending marijuana through the parcel companies. The business netted approximately $500,000 annually. Hutson was arrested by the DEA, and Hutson served a sentence of 51 months beginning in 2007 at the age of 23, The indictment was for shipping approximately 2 tons of marijuana, accepting marijuana from Mexico and shipping it to Florida. He was released in 2012 to a half-way house.

== Pigeonly ==
While in prison Hutson encountered the difficulty that American inmates have with communicating with their family and friends outside of the institution and developed an idea for delivering communications for individuals residing in prison. After leaving prison he founded a company, Pigeonly, which prints out electronic communications for prisoners and mails them through the postal system to them in order to be better accepted by the prison system. His business venture was accepted in the incubators Y Combinator and NewMe. The enterprise was cofounded in 2013 with Alfonzo Brooks, whom had employed Hutson during his final year in prison when Hutson was admitted to a work-release program. Hutson currently serves as the company’s CEO. By 2015 the company had forwarded around a million pieces of mail and facilitated about eight million minutes of telephone calls.
