= Brandon High School (Florida) =

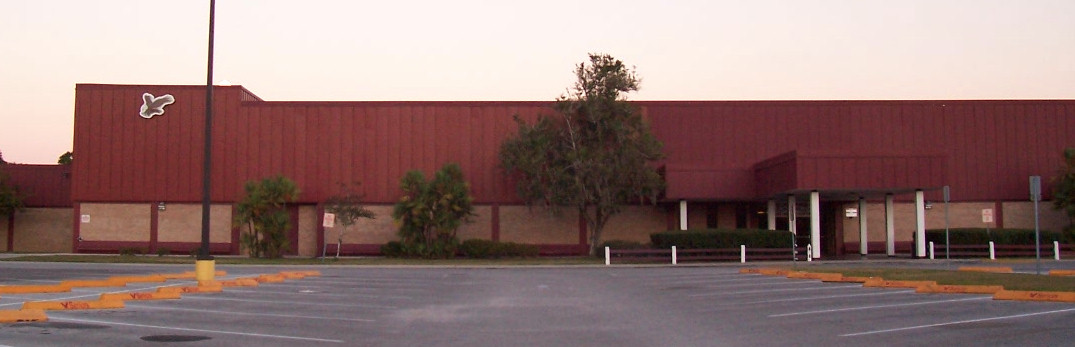

Location
- 1101 Victoria Street; Brandon, Florida 33510; United States; 27°56′39″N 82°17′59″W

Information
- Type: Public high school
- Established: 1914
- School district: Hillsborough County Public Schools
- Principal: Allison Wright
- Teaching staff: 74.00 (FTE)
- Grades: 9-12
- Enrollment: 1,588 (2023–2024)
- Student to teacher ratio: 21.46
- Colors: Maroon; White; Black
- Mascot: Eagles
- Website: HillsboroughSchools.org/o/Brandon

Brandon High School is a public high school in Brandon, Florida, United States. It is overseen by the School District of Hillsborough County.

== History ==
The school originally opened in 1914 on the current site of McLane Middle School, for the education of white students only. In 1966, due to the federal lawsuit Manning vs. the School Board of Hillsborough County, a small group of African-American students were permitted to attend for the first time, and in 1971, large scale busing to improve integration of the school commenced. In 2001, the school district achieved unitary status and mandated busing was ended. In 1972, the school moved to its current location on Victoria Street in Brandon. The school colors are maroon and white. The school mascot is the Eagle. Brandon High is currently Pending school grade in SDHC's high school grading scale. The school has been awarded Blue Ribbon School status.

== Demographics ==
The demographic breakdown of the 1,957 students enrolled in 2012-2013 was:

- Male - 51.8%
- Female - 48.2%
- Native American/Alaskan - 0.4%
- Asian/Pacific islanders - 2.2%
- Black - 19.7%
- Hispanic - 30.0%
- White - 44.0%
- Multiracial - 3.7%

Additionally, 54.3% of the students were eligible for free or reduced lunch.

== Athletics ==
=== Wrestling ===
The Brandon wrestling team holds the national record for the longest winning streak, in not just wrestling, but by a high school sports team. The wrestling team won 459 straight dual meet matches, which spanned from 1973 to 2008. Their dual meet win streak ended on January 5, 2008, when Brandon was defeated by South Dade High School 32–28. Brandon wrestling has won 28 FHSAA state tournament championships, the most of any high school in Florida. This included 17 state championships in a row from 2001 to 2017.

=== Soccer ===
Brandon High boys won the state championship in 2003.

== Brandon High School nature preserve ==
This approximately 1.5-acre (6,100 m^{2}) wooded site located on the south side of the campus was designated an official Schoolyard Habitat in 2006 by the National Wildlife Federation. Ecology students help collect animal and plant data annually using a variety of tools and technologies including Global Positioning Satellite (GPS) receivers and digital cameras.

They also construct nesting boxes for birds and roosting boxes for bats to help increase the biodiversity of the area. Many other classes use the area as an outdoor classroom, including art, English, performing arts, and technology.

== Notable alumni ==
- Colleen Bevis, children’s advocate
- Scott Blake, visual artist
- J. S. G. Boggs, visual artist
- Terry Butler, bassist for death metal acts Obituary, Death, Six Feet Under, and Massacre
- Chris Cates, former professional baseball player.
- Mark Consuelos, actor
- Rick Barrio Dill, bass guitar player
- Chone Figgins, former professional baseball player
- David Galloway, former professional football player
- Franklin Gómez, Olympic freestyle wrestler representing Puerto Rico, NCAA wrestling champion and three-time All-American at Michigan State
- Joey Graham, former professional basketball player
- Stevie Graham, former professional basketball player
- Danny Graves, former professional baseball player
- Garry Hancock, former professional baseball player
- Frederick Hutson, entrepreneur
- Gene Killian, former professional football player
- Toney Mack, former professional basketball player
- Mark Meadows, U.S. Congressman and chief of staff to President Donald Trump
- Admiral Charles D. Michel, 30th Vice Commandant of the United States Coast Guard
- Paul Orndorff, former professional wrestler
- Mike Pucillo, former professional football player
- Evan Ravenel, basketball player
- Jody Reed, former professional baseball player
- Dwayne Schintzius, former professional basketball player
- Ross Spano, U.S. Congressman
- Ronda Storms, Florida state legislature
- Ozzie Timmons, baseball player and coach
- Jeff Turner, former professional basketball player
- David Gee Sheriff for the Hillsbrough County Sheriff's Office (2004–2017)
