= The Road from Memphis =

Studio album by Booker T. Jones
- Released: May 10, 2011
- Studios: MSR, New York City
- Length: 41:09
- Label: ANTI-
- Producers: Booker T. Jones, Rob Schnapf, Ahmir Thompson

Booker T. Jones chronology
Home Grown (2009)	The Road from Memphis (2011)	Sound the Alarm (2013)

The Road from Memphis is the ninth studio album by Booker T. Jones, released in May 2011 through the record label ANTI. On the album, Booker T. is backed by hip–hop band the Roots. The album reached a peak position of number 85 on the Billboard 200 and received a Grammy Award for Best Pop Instrumental Album. Mojo placed the album at number 42 on its list of "Top 50 albums of 2011."

== Track listing ==
1. "Walking Papers" (Kirk Douglas, Jones)
2. "Crazy" (Brian Burton, Thomas Callaway, Gian Franco Reverberi, Gian Piero Reverberi)
3. "Progress" (Jones, Yim Yames) – vocals by Jim James as 'Yim Yames'
4. "The Hive" (Jones)
5. "Down in Memphis" (Jones) – vocals by Jones
6. "Everything Is Everything" (Lauryn Hill)
7. "Rent Party" (Jones)
8. "Representing Memphis" (Jones, Liv Jones) – vocals by Matt Berninger and Sharon Jones
9. "The Vamp" (Jones)
10. "Harlem House" (Jones)
11. "The Bronx" (Jones, Liv Jones) – vocals by Lou Reed

Bonus digital tracks

1. "Just a Friend" – vocals by Biz Markie, Matt Berninger and Sharon Jones)
2. "The Seed"
3. "Regulation Time"
