= Chris Cates =

American baseball player

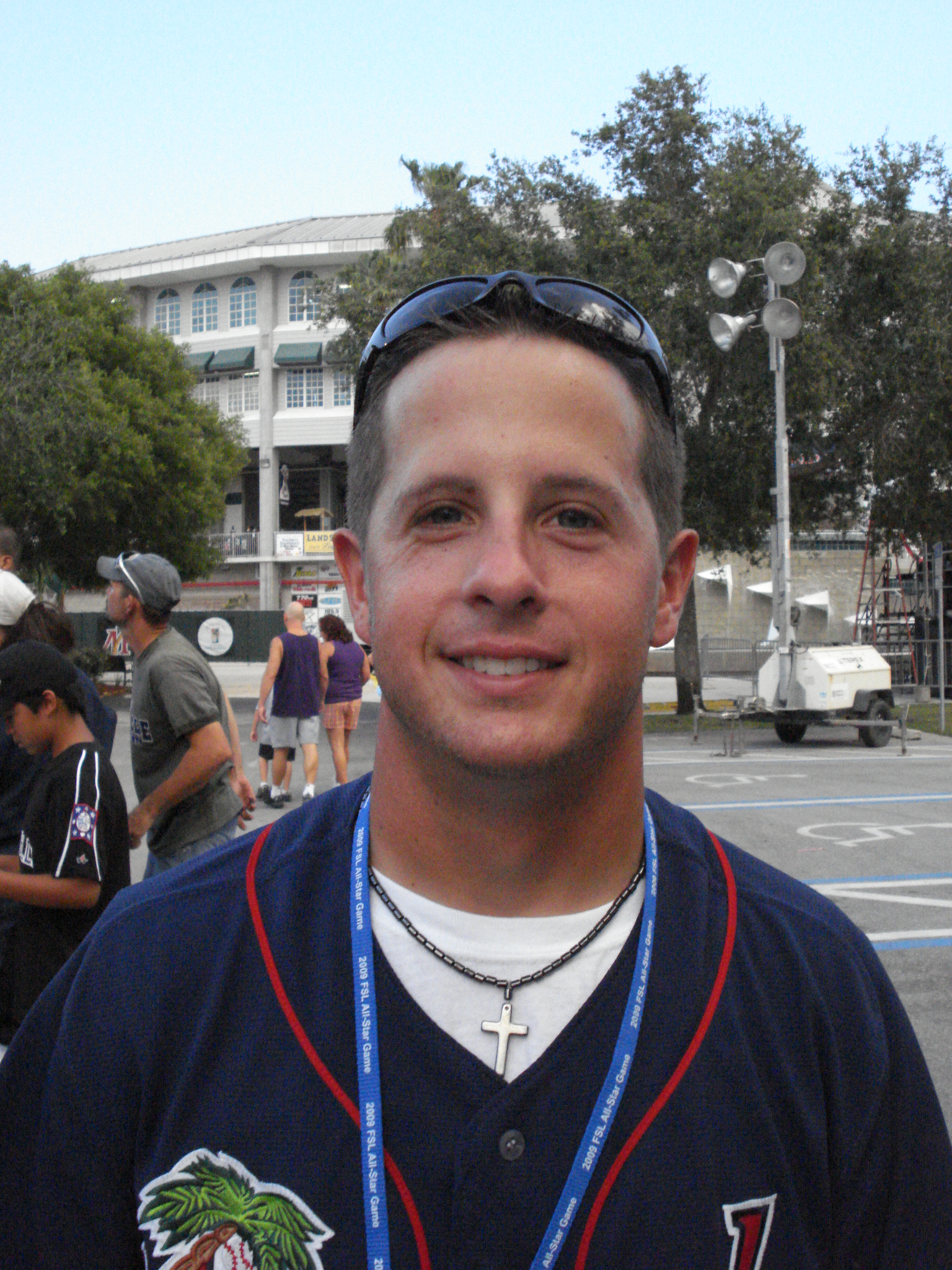

Current position
- Title: Head coach
- Team: Riverview (FL) H. S.

Biographical details
- Born: April 15, 1985 (age 41); Tampa, Florida, U.S.

Playing career
- 2004–2007: Louisville
- 2007: Elizabethton Twins
- 2007–2008: Beloit Snappers
- 2009–2010: Fort Myers Miracle
- 2010–2011: New Britain Rock Cats
- Position: Shortstop

Coaching career (HC unless noted)
- 2013: Florida State (asst.)
- 2014: Tampa (asst.)
- 2015–2019: South Florida (asst.)
- 2020–present: Riverview (FL) H. S.

Chris Cates (born April 15, 1985) is an American former minor league shortstop selected by the Minnesota Twins in the 38th round of the 2007 Major League Baseball draft. Cates is currently Director of Player Development at the University of South Florida. He is a former volunteer assistant coach for the Florida State University Seminoles baseball team. Also he is the manager of the North Adams Steeplecats of the NECBL.

Cates graduated in 2003 from Brandon High School in Brandon, Florida where he was a four-year letter winner in baseball. When he joined the University of Louisville Cardinals in 2004, he was the smallest player in NCAA Division I baseball. Despite standing only 5'3" tall and weighing just 145 lbs., his junior year he was named Third-Team All-Big East while leading the Louisville Cardinals with a .332 batting average and 47 runs scored.

Cates also played for the North Adams Steeplecats of the New England Collegiate Baseball League, a collegiate summer baseball league. He won the Most Valuable Player award at the 2005 NECBL All-Star Game. He is returning to the North Adams Steeplecats for the summer of 2014 as their manager.

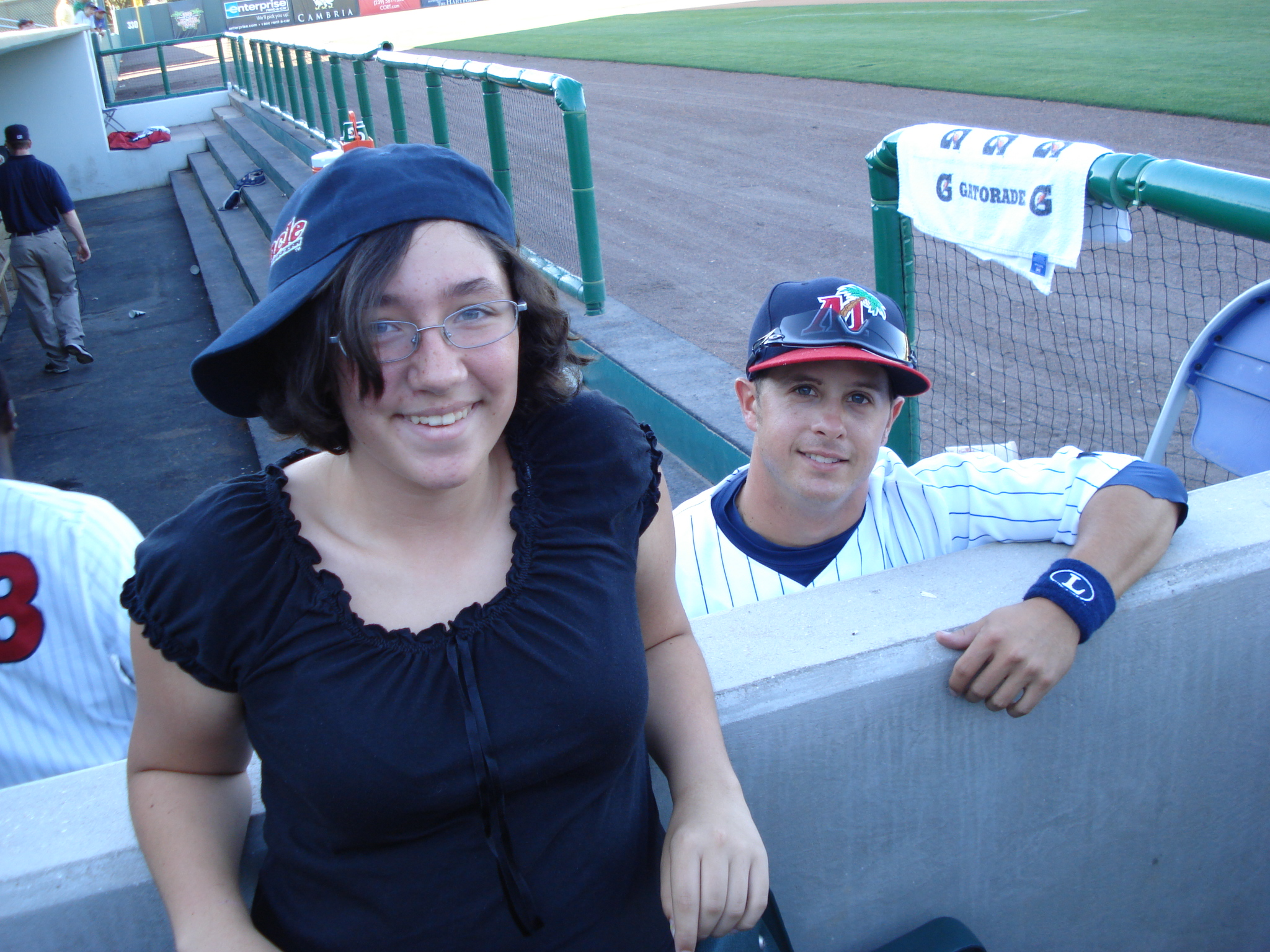
Cates (right) and a fan

In 2008, he represented the Beloit Snappers in the Midwest League All-Star game, and in 2009, Cates was 1–3 with a walk and a run scored as the starting shortstop for the South in the Florida State League All-Star game. For the season, he batted .251 with 25 runs batted in and 41 runs scored. Cates split 2010 between Fort Myers and New Britain, batting a combined .198. He improved modestly to a .205 hitter in 2011 for New Britain, and retired at the end of the season. For his career, he batted .228 with 109 RBIs and 163 runs scored. He never hit a professional home run.
