= Colleen Bevis =

American children's advocate (1916–2013)

Colleen Lunsford Bevis
- Born: September 5, 1916; Hillsborough County, Florida
- Died: October 11, 2013 (aged 97); Hillsborough County, Florida
- Education: University of Tampa
- Occupation: Children's advocate

Colleen Lunsford Bevis (1916–2013) was a prominent children's advocate in Hillsborough County, Florida, US. She was active for six decades and instrumental in founding the Children's Board of Hillsboough County. She became Florida state president of the Parent Teachers Association.

== Biography ==
Colleen Lunsford was born on September 5, 1916, to J.J. and Geraldine Lunsford, one of eight brothers and sisters. A Hillsborough County native, Colleen attended E. Lee Elementary School, graduated from Brandon High School, and went on to attend the University of Tampa. Upon graduation, she went on to marry H. Wayne Bevis, who became an executive for Eastern Air Lines of Tampa. Colleen and H. Wayne Bevis were married for a total of 52 years before his death. Colleen and her husband have three daughters, Dorothy Ann Ward, Beverly Bevis, and Judith Bevis Langevin. Colleen was step-mother to Dorothy Ann Ward, who preceded her in death.

Bevis spent over sixty years dedicated to children's advocacy. In memory of Colleen, Hillsborough County Public Schools writes, "From the early days of the fifties to today, Mrs. Bevis has been tireless, consistently working long hours every week voluntarily advocating, organizing, patiently informing, inspiring, and when necessary, cajoling those able to help children". Colleen joined the local PTA in 1951, where she later became a local president. This was her initial step towards a long career of child advocacy. One of her most notable accomplishments was her role in the creation of the Hillsborough County Children's Board, which she organized alongside of Hillsborough County Commissioner, Jan Platt.

Bevis volunteered with multiple organizations, including the Hillsborough PTA, the Florida Public School Board, and the Hillsborough County Department of Children's Services board of advisers, of which she also chaired.

== Awards ==
Bevis has won numerous awards for child advocacy efforts. Hillsborough County Schools notes her awards received as follows:

- Service to Mankind award, Tampa Downtown and Central Florida Sertoma Club, 1977
- Northside Residential Unit for Emotionally disturbed Children dedicated to Colleen Lunsford, 1981
- Eliza Woolf Award for Service to the Community, Tampa United Methodist Centers, 1981
- Hillsborough Board of County Commissioners named the Children's Services Office the Colleen Lunsford Bevis Administration Building, 1986
- Public Citizen of the Year, Tampa Bay Unit of the National Association of Social Workers, 1982
- Florida JC Penny Golden Rule Award for volunteerism, 1985
- Award for Leadership, Hillsborough Constituency for Children, 1985
- People of Dedication Award, Salvation Army Women's Auxiliary, 1988
- Child Advocate of the Year, Gulf Coast Division, Children's Home Society of Florida, 1989
- University of South Florida, President's Distinguished Citizen's Award, 1990
- National Child Labor Committee, Lewis Hine Award, 1993 (presented by Hillary Clinton)

== Death and legacy ==
Bevis died on October 11, 2013, at her home in Hillsborough County, Florida.

In 2000, the Hillsborough County School Board named an elementary school in her honor, the Colleen Bevis Elementary School. The school is located in Lithia, Florida, and is home to the Bevis Broncos. According to the Hillsborough County Public School System, "In 1987, the cooperative school program for severely emotionally disturbed students at USF's Department of Child and Family Studies was officially named the Colleen Lunsford Bevis School by both USF and Hillsborough County School Board in recognition of her work". Located on the same campus at that time, the Colleen Bevis Resource and Education Center held systems of care resources for children and families. According to the Florida Mental Health Institute, the resource center was also a place for "...public interest, non-profit civic and support groups to hold meetings and conduct organizational activities." Both the Colleen Lunsford Bevis School and Resource Center located on the USF campus have since closed. Recently, the Children's Board dedicated a board room in Colleen's honor as well.

Bevis's personal collection of papers, clippings, correspondence, and resources are held by the Louis de la Parte Florida Mental Health Institute Research Library. According to the library, the collection "consists of documents and other materials detailing Bevis’ work as an advocate for the mental and social health and well-being of children in Hillsborough County, Florida. The bulk of the archive reflects Bevis’ professional service and commitment to child welfare, with particular emphasis on the development of such local and statewide organizations as the Hillsborough County Children’s Board, SEDNET and the Colleen Bevis School at the Florida Mental Health Institute... Researchers may be interested in the collection’s usefulness for chronicling the evolution of child welfare services in Hillsborough County as related to mental and emotional health".
