= Scott Blake =

American new media artist (born 1976)

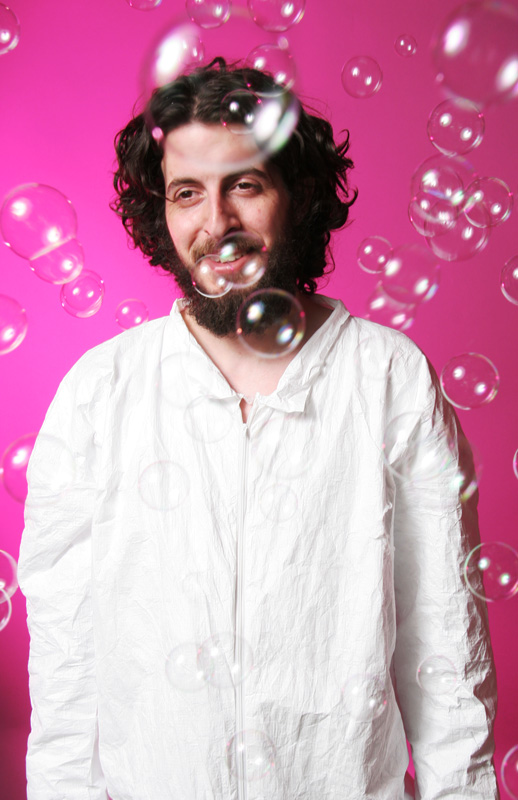
- Scott Blake
- Born: October 20, 1976 (age 50); Tampa, Florida, United States
- Education: Savannah College of Art and Design
- Known for: New Media, Postmodernism, Existentialism
- Notable work: Barcode Jesus, Barcode Yourself, Downloading Pixels, 9/11 Flipbook
- Awards: Adobe Design Achievement Award, Omaha Entertainment and Arts Award
- Website: BarcodeArt.com

Scott Blake (born October 20, 1976, in Tampa, Florida) is an American artist. Similar to the works of pop art, Blake has used everyday images to produce his art. His early works were based entirely on the idea of creating images and art from barcodes.

== Education ==
Blake graduated from Brandon Senior High School in Tampa, Florida in 1995. He received a BFA in computer art from the Savannah College of Art and Design in 2003.

== Works ==
In 2003, Blake created Downloading Pixels which shows a progression of downloaded pixels that in turn become an image that could be viewed on a monitor or mobile device. Like John F. Simon Jr.'s Every Icon, each pixel is an image that loads up at different intervals to make the image seem like an animation, caused by the changing pixels. The image is tailored based on user-chosen image size, browser technology, internet connection speed, and device, causing the work to look differently on each platform.

In 2006, Blake created a flipbook consisting of images of United Airlines Flight 175 crashing into the South Tower of the World Trade Center. Accompanying the images are essays written by a wide range of participants, each expressing their personal experience of the September 11 attacks. The 9/11 Flipbook project is ongoing and Blake is still accepting written reactions to it.

In November 2010, artist Chuck Close threatened legal action against Scott Blake for creating a Photoshop filter that built images out of dissected Chuck Close paintings. Kembrew McLeod, author of several books on sampling and appropriation, said in Wired that Scott Blake's art should fall under the doctrine of fair use.
