= Kyle Daniel =

American singer-songwriter

- Birth name: Kyle Lewis Daniel
- Born: September 11, 1985 (age 39); Bowling Green, Kentucky, US
- Genres: Country music
- Occupations: Singer-songwriter; musician
- Instruments: Vocals; guitar
- Labels: independent
- Website: kyledanielmusic.com

Kyle Daniel is a country music singer, guitarist and songwriter based in Nashville, Tennessee.

== Early life ==
Born in Bowling Green, Kentucky, Daniel was introduced to country music at an early age – his father played the banjo in the bluegrass group The Original Lonesome Road Travellers. Daniel came with him to local bluegrass festivals and picking parties. His mother also played the bass and piano.

Daniel started playing the drums at six years old, continuing until he was sixteen and broke his leg, making it impossible to continue the instrument. He also tried out the saxophone and piano before getting introduced to the guitar at 13. After breaking his leg at sixteen, he committed to this instrument, and he created a band with Dan Robinson and Jason Williams. It was named The Lonesome Road Travellers after Daniel's father's band. Daniel took guitar lessons with Bobby Baldwin during this time, but he stopped when Baldwin insisted he needed to learn to read music – which Daniel never learned to this day. When the bandmates' styles began diverging, they dissolved the band before heading to college.

Kenny Lee was an important mentor for Daniel and suggested that he start a new band, the Kyle Daniel Band, while he was still in high school. Through the years, this band performed at Grand Opening of Harley-Davidson of Bowling Green, Concerts in the Park Rock N River Fest, Kentucky Blues Fest and the Owensboro BBQ Festival.

When Daniel was sixteen years old, the Kyle Daniel Band won the Southern Kentucky Blues Society Blues Challenge. The next year the band entered the 2004 International Blues Challenge in Memphis, TN, making it to the finals. In his early twenties, Daniel was named "Nashville's Best Guitarist" at the 102.9 Buzz Rock Awards.

He graduated from high school in 2004 and moved onto Middle Tennessee State University (MTSU) to study Recording Industry Management with a concentration in music business. He met up with a group of musicians and created the band The Last Straw, which toured on Kentucky, Alabama, Arkansas, Texas and Florida.

== Career ==
Both as a songwriter and a performer, Daniel has collaborated with big names in country music. Throughout the years, he has shared the stage with artists such as Anderson East, Jimmy Hall, Wet Willie, Casey James, Clare Dunn and Jericho Woods and has worked in writing rooms with big names such as Kendell Marvel, Will Hoge, Seth Rentfrow, Brent Cobb, Channing Wilson and Rob Snyder.

After supporting other artists for years, Kyle Daniel broke off to make a name for himself, releasing a self-titled EP in 2018 that he self-published without a label. It was well received: later that year, Rolling Stone praised Kyle Daniel as one of their "10 Country Artists You Need to Know in 2018" and as the "Best Crunchy Rocker" on their "2018 AmericanaFest: Best Things We Saw at Nashville Event" list. Raised Rowdy celebrated his self-titled EP as one of their "Top EPs of 2018."

Daniel opened for the Vintage Trouble in their 2019 tour.

In 2019, Daniel played in Country Music Week (CMW), including a performance with Brandy Clark at the O2 Shepherd's Bush Empire. He was invited back to the 2020 Country 2 Country Festival and performed in Amsterdam and Berlin, but the festival was cancelled halfway through due to concerns over COVID-19 pandemic. He returned to the US before being able to perform at the O2 Arena London.

During the COVID-19 pandemic, Daniel has been staying in East Nashville, working on his first full-length album and writing new music.

== Artistry ==
His music was heavily influenced from the get-go by the songwriting and storytelling of The Allman Brothers and Gregg Allman. Later, he was inspired by Chris Stapleton, Jason Isbell and Brent Cobb.

Daniel self-described his music as "a mix of Country, Southern rock and Americana: I like to call it Homegrown Kentucky Rock N Soul." Rolling Stone describes Daniel as having "the gravely twang of Steve Earle with Chris Stapleton's range, plus bigger hooks" with his own "rich, melodic breed of baritone country."

== Discography ==
Singles
| Name | Details | Collaborators | Notable |
|---|---|---|---|
| "God Bless America (Born to Lose)" – 2:50 | Release date: 2019; Label: self-released | | |
| "Born to Lose" – 2:47 | Release date: 2019; Label: self-released; Music video | Jordan Young – co-writer for "Born To Lose" | |
| "A Friend With Weed" – 2:58 | Release date: 2019; Label: self-released | Dave Kennedy – co-writer for "A Friend With Weed" Newsome Corbitt – co-writer for "A Friend With Weed" | |
| Digital 45: A-side: "This American Dream" – 3:33; B-side: "Hollerin' Hills" – 2:58 | Release date: 2020; Label: self-released; Music Videos: This American Dream; Hollerin' Hills | Dylan Altman – co-writer for "This American Dream" Will Hoge – co-writer for "This American Dream" Adam Wright – co-writer for "Hollerin' Hills" | "This American Dream" premiered on Country Hits Radio "This American Dream" was Rolling Stone Country's "Pick of the Week" September 14, 2020 "This American Dream" was Songwriting Magazine's "Song of the Day" and put on their roundup "On The Stereo" "Hollerin' Hills" was Rolling Stone Country's "Pick of the Week" March 15, 2021 |

EPs
| Name | Details | Songs | Collaborators |
|---|---|---|---|
| Kyle Daniel | Release date: March 30, 2018; Label: Self-released | Song List – Kyle Daniel: 1. Hangover Town – 2:56; 2. Keep On Rollin' – 3:26; 3. Ain't No Difference – 3:00; 4. Halfway to Your Heart – 3:32; 5. That Somebody Ain't Me – 3:29 | Brent Cobb – writer of "Ain't No Difference" |
| What's There To Say | Release date: March 14, 2019; Label: Self-released | Song List – What's There To Say: 1. Born to Lose – 2:49; 2. Don't Give Up On Me – 3:01; 3. Somewhere in Between – 3:38; 4. God Bless America (Damn Rock n' Roll) – 2:52; 5. What's There to Say? – 3:14; Music Videos: 1. God Bless America (Damn Rock n' Roll); 2. What's There to Say? | Jackie Leigh – co-writer for "Somewhere in Between" Seth Rentfrow – co-writer for "Don't Give Up On Me," "Somewhere in Between," "God Bless America (Damn Rock n' Roll)" and "What's There to Say?" Jordan Young – co-writer for "Born To Lose" |

Albums
| Name | Details | Songs | Collaborators |
|---|---|---|---|
| Kentucky Gold | Release date: Expected early 2021; Trailer music video | N/A | N/A |
