= Dakota Moon (album) =

Studio album by Dakota Moon
- Released: April 14, 1998
- Genre: R&B
- Label: Elektra
- Producers: Warren Smiley Campbell; Andrew Logan; Mike More

Dakota Moon chronology
Dakota Moon (1998)	A Place to Land (2002)

Singles from Dakota Moon
- 1. "A Promise I Make" Released: 1998; 2. "Another Day Goes By" Released: 1998

Professional ratings
Review scores
Source	Rating
AllMusic	4/5 stars

Dakota Moon is the debut album by American R&B group Dakota Moon, released on April 14, 1998, on Elektra Records.

"A Promise I Make" and "Another Day Goes By" were Top 20 hits on the Hot Adult Contemporary Tracks chart, peaking at No. 11 and No. 19 respectively.

== Track listing ==
All tracks are written by Dakota Moon, Andrew Logan, and Mike More, except where noted.

Side A
No.	Title	Writer(s)	Length
1.	"Another Day Goes By"		3:36
2.	"A Promise I Make"	Kennedy, Kirkpatrick, Logan, More, Tommy	4:27
3.	"Violet"		4:13
4.	"She Knows"		3:50
5.	"Won't Be Alone Tonight"		3:55
6.	"If I Can't Love You"		4:06
7.	"Sing You to Sleep"		4:23
8.	"Call on Me"	Campbell, Logan, More	4:12
9.	"Black Moon Day"		3:53
10.	"Snow in July"	Kennedy, Kirkpatrick	3:55
11.	"Sweet Lady Jane"		4:19
12.	"Your Smiling Face"	Taylor	3:07
13.	"Til We Meet Again (Includes, "In the Light of Day", at 4:56)"		9:19

== Charts ==
Chart (1998)	Peak position
Australian Albums (ARIA Charts)	50
