= Ty Taylor =

American musician

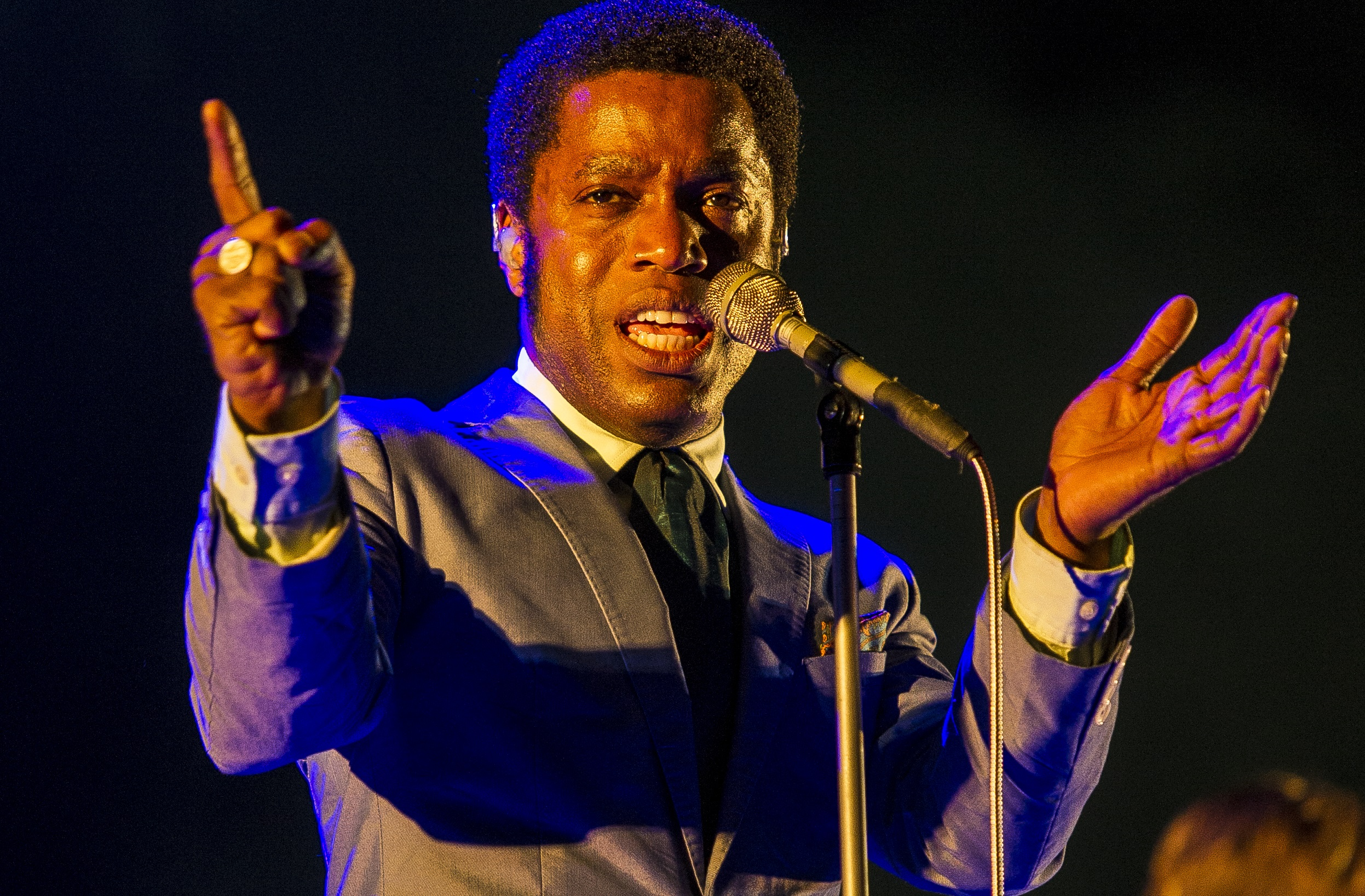
Taylor performing with Vintage Trouble in 2014

Ty Taylor (born January 5, 1969, in Montclair, New Jersey) is an American musician best known for being the lead singer of Los Angeles soul rock band Vintage Trouble. He is the voice of character Lester Grimes on the HBO series Vinyl created by Martin Scorsese and Mick Jagger. Taylor has two songs, "Cha Cha Twist" and "The World Is Yours," featured on the 2016 soundtrack album Vinyl: Music from the HBO Original Series, Volume 1. He was formerly the guitarist and vocalist of R&B group Dakota Moon and was also a contestant on the reality TV show Rock Star: INXS.

== Music career ==
Gospel music was a significant influence on Taylor, having sung in a Baptist Church choir in his youth. Other musical influences include Otis Redding, Tina Turner and The Clash.

After leaving Rockstar: INXS, he was asked by Dave Navarro to sing guest lead vocals for his band Camp Freddy. In 2008, he formed the group Ghost Hounds and recorded a debut album, two songs from which were released as downloadable content for the video game Rock Band 2.

He has toured with many artists including Tina Turner, Eric Clapton, Beth Hart, Macy Gray, Fiona Apple, and Robert Taylor.

Taylor appeared on the cast recording of Jason Robert Brown's Songs for a New World recorded in 1996.

Taylor also appeared as a guest singer on the bonus album given away with Shout, recorded by Govt Mule, on the song "Bring on the Music." Other guests included Steve Winwood, Elvis Costello, and Dr. John.

Most recently, Taylor has been the front man for the Los Angeles soul rock band Vintage Trouble. Notable performances include a supporting performance at the final concert of the annual free Summer Concert Series at The Americana at Brand where Vintage Trouble opened for Paula Cole and Tyler Hilton, a headlining performance on the second stage of the California AIDS Walk (Taylor also performed Simon & Garfunkel's "Bridge Over Troubled Water" on the main stage at the same benefit), and their weekly Tuesday night residency at Harvelle's Blues Club in Santa Monica, California.

Vintage Trouble has supported rock acts like Lenny Kravitz, Joss Stone, Paloma Faith, the Dixie Chicks, The Who, Bon Jovi and AC/DC on the 2015 Rock or Bust World Tour.

== Discography ==
2019 Chapter II—EP II Vintage Trouble / Composer, Group Member, Lead Vocals
2018 Chapter II—EP I Vintage Trouble / Composer, Group Member, Lead Vocals
2016 VINYL: MUSIC FROM THE HBO® ORIGINAL SERIES – VOLUME 1 / Various Artists
2015 1 Hopeful Rd. / Vintage Trouble / Composer, Group Member, Lead Vocals
2015 Walt Disney Records the Legacy Collection: The Aristocats / Various Artists / Primary Artist
2014 The Swing House Acoustic Sessions / Vintage Trouble / Lead Vocals
2013 Sound the Alarm / Booker T. Jones / Composer, Group Member, Lead Vocals
2013 Shout! / Gov't Mule Featured Artist, Primary Artist
2012 Dr. Seuss' the Lorax [Original Songs from the Motion Picture] / Primary Artist
2012 It's Good to Be Live / Pablo Cruise Featured Artist
2011 The Bomb Shelter Sessions / Vintage Trouble Composer, Group Member, Lead Vocals
2010 Disney Sing-Along: Camp Rock 2: The Final Jam / Vocals (Background)
2010 Happily Ever After / Primary Artist
2009 Dance Flick (Soundtrack) / Primary Artist
2009 Rock On / Michael Damian Vocals (Background)
2008 Bounce / Oryon / Composer
2008 Selling Tenderness / Yi Feng Zhuo Composer
2007 Reality TV Stars, Vol.1 / Composer, Primary Artist
2007 Waiting on Tomorrow / Travis Mitchell Member of Attributed Artist, Guitar, Guitars, Banjo, Guitar (Bass), Vocals (Background), Bass, Vocal Harmony
2005 Rock Star: A Night at the Mayan Theatre / Primary Artist
2005 Rock Star: INXS / Primary Artist
2002 A Place to Land / Dakota Moon Vocals, Guitar, Composer
2002 Here We Go Again / Steve Ewing Vocals (Background)
1997 Songs for a New World / Performer, Primary Artist, Vocals
1990 The Legendary V-Disc Masters (1943-1944), Vol. 1 / Red Norvo & His Overseas Spotlight Band / Primary Artist

== Musical theater ==
Taylor studied at Carnegie Mellon University in Pittsburgh, where he graduated with a Bachelor of Fine Arts degree in drama and music. In addition to his work with Dakota Moon and Rock Star: INXS, Taylor's music career has included parts in Broadway musicals Joseph and the Amazing Technicolor Dreamcoat, Pippin, Songs for a New World, Grease, and We Will Rock You. Taylor also played the role of "Freddie" in a Los Angeles performance of the musical Chess, written by Tim Rice, Benny Andersson and Björn Ulvaeus.

He also co-starred in the spoof Rogers the Musical with Adam Pascal, featured in the Marvel Cinematic Universe show Hawkeye.
