= We Want Groove =

Studio album by Rock Candy Funk Party
- Released: January 25, 2013
- Recorded: August 2012
- Genre: Jazz fusion
- Length: 67:01
- Label: J&R Adventures (USA); Provogue (Worldwide)
- Producer: Tal Bergman

Rock Candy Funk Party chronology
We Want Groove (2013)	Groove Is King (2015)

We Want Groove is the debut studio album by American jazz and funk group Rock Candy Funk Party. It was released on January 25, 2013 through J&R Adventures.

== Track listing ==
All tracks written by Tal Bergman / Joe Bonamassa / Ron DeJesus / Michael Merritt / Renato Neto unless indicated

No.	Title	Writer(s)	Length
1.	"Octopus-e"		4:39
2.	"Spaztastic"		5:50
3.	"Ode to Gee"		8:05
4.	"We Want Groove"		6:10
5.	"The Best Ten Minutes of Your Life"		10:36
6.	"Animal/Work"		7:14
7.	"Dope on a Rope"		3:47
8.	"Root Down (And Get It)"	James Smith	5:00
9.	"New York Song (includes hidden track "Mr Clean")"		15:40
Total length:			67:01
