= Dakota Moon =

American band

- Origin: Los Angeles, California, United States
- Genres: Rock, Pop, R&B
- Years active: 1998–present
- Label: Elektra
- Past members: Ray Artis; Joe Dean; Malloy; Ty Taylor

Dakota Moon was an American band formed in Los Angeles, California, United States, in the mid-1990s. The band played a meld of pop rock, country and urban R&B; all four of the band members sang as well as played instruments. The group is composed of Ray Artis (bass guitar, vocals), Joe Dean (guitar, vocals), Malloy (percussion, vocals), and Ty Taylor (guitar, vocals). To date, they have released two studio albums for Elektra Records, and have charted three singles on the Billboard singles charts.

== History ==
The four members of Dakota Moon met during a recording session in Los Angeles, and decided to form a full-time band because the session went well. After touring the L. A. club circuit, the band was signed with Elektra Records in 1997 by Elektra's CEO Sylvia Rhone, and was hired to open for Hall and Oates and Tina Turner later that same year. Dakota Moon released two albums for Elektra, in 1998 and 2002, and charted three hits in the US.

== Discography ==
- Dakota Moon (1998)
- A Place to Land (2002)

== Charting singles ==
Year	Title	Chart positions					Album
Year	Title	US AC	US Adult T40	US T40 Main	US	AUS	Album
1998	"A Promise I Make"	11		37	69	-	Dakota Moon
1998	"Another Day Goes By"	19	36			99	Dakota Moon
2002	"Looking for a Place to Land"	30	27			-	A Place to Land
