= Groove Is King =

Grooove is King

Studio album by Rock Candy Funk Party
- Released: July 31, 2015
- Genre: Jazz Fusion
- Length: 71:38
- Label: J&R Adventures (USA); Provogue (Worldwide)
- Producer: Tal Bergman

Rock Candy Funk Party chronology
We Want Groove (2013)	Grooove is King (2015)	The Groove Cubed (2017)

Grooove is King is the second studio album by American jazz and funk group Rock Candy Funk Party. It was released on July 31, 2015 through J&R Adventures. The album features Billy Gibbons from ZZ Top as "Mr Funkadamus".

== Track listing ==
All tracks written by Tal Bergman / Joe Bonamassa / Ron DeJesus / Michael Merritt unless indicated.

No.	Title	Writer(s)	Length
1.	"Introducing The Master Of Ceremonies Mr. Funkadamus"		0:30
2.	"Grooove Is King"		3:27
3.	"Low Tide"		2:48
4.	"Uber Station"		5:02
5.	"East Village"		6:53
6.	"If Six Was Eight"		4:44
7.	"Cube's Brick"		7:32
8.	"And Now A Word From Our Fine Sponsors With Mr. Funkadamus"		0:18
9.	"Don't Be Stingy With The SMPTE"		5:17
10.	"C You On The Flip Side"		5:06
11.	"Digging in the Dirt"	Peter Gabriel	6:18
12.	"Don't Funk With Me"		5:54
13.	"The 6 Train To The Bronx"		6:05
14.	"Rock Candy"	Jack McDuff	5:27
15.	"Mr. Funkadamus Thanks All The Senors But Especially The Senoritas"		0:27
16.	"The Fabulous Tales Of Two Bands"		5:40
Total length:			71:38
