= The Bomb Shelter Sessions =

Studio album by Vintage Trouble
- Released: 25 July 2011
- Recorded: 2010 at Bomb Shelter Studios, Los Angeles, California
- Genre: Rhythm and blues, soul, blues, rock and roll
- Length: 42:20
- Label: Vintage Trouble
- Producer: Peter McCabe

Vintage Trouble chronology
The Bomb Shelter Sessions (2011)	The Swing House Acoustic Sessions (2014)

Singles from The Bomb Shelter Sessions
- 1. "Blues Hand Me Down" Released: 2010; 2. "Nobody Told Me" Released: 2011; 3. "Nancy Lee" Released: 2012

The Bomb Shelter Sessions is the first studio album by Vintage Trouble, released on 25 July 2011.

== Track listing ==
No.	Title	Length
1.	"Blues Hand Me Down"	3:47
2.	"Still and Always Will"	3:25
3.	"Nancy Lee"	3:43
4.	"Gracefully"	3:40
5.	"You Better Believe It"	4:12
6.	"Not Alright By Me"	3:22
7.	"Nobody Told Me"	4:38
8.	"Jezzebella"	4:02
9.	"Total Strangers"	3:36
10.	"Run Outta You"	8:15
Total length:		42:20

Deluxe edition bonus tracks
No.	Title	Length
11.	"Love With Me (Live)"	4:43
12.	"Nancy Lee (Live)"	3:34
13.	"Come on By"	3:52
14.	"Total Strangers (Round 2)"	3:19
15.	"World's Gonna Have to Take a Turn Around"	2:38

Encore edition bonus tracks
No.	Title	Length
11.	"Pelvis Pusher"	3:07
12.	"Run Like the River"	2:17
13.	"Total Strangers (Live)"	6:51
