= 1 Hopeful Rd. =

Studio album by Vintage Trouble
- Released: August 14, 2015
- Recorded: 2015; EastWest Studios, Los Angeles, California
- Genres: Rhythm and blues, soul, blues, rock and roll
- Length: 42:20
- Labels: Blue Note Records, Capitol Music Group
- Producer: Don Was

Singles from 1 Hopeful Rd.
- 1. "Run Like the River" Released: 2015; 2. "Doin' What You Were Doin'" Released: 2015

1 Hopeful Rd. is the third studio album by Vintage Trouble, released on August 14, 2015, by Blue Note Records.

== Reception ==
Professional ratings
Aggregate scores
Source	Rating
AnyDecentMusic?	5.7/10
Metacritic	61/100
Review scores
Source	Rating
Drowned in Sound	4/10
The Guardian	3/5 stars
Paste	7/10

1 Hopeful Rd. received mixed reviews from critics. On Metacritic, the album holds a score of 61/100 based on 4 reviews, indicating "generally favorable reviews".

== Track listing ==
No.	Title	Length
1.	"Run Like the River"	3:40
2.	"From My Arms"	3:01
3.	"Doin' What You Were Doin'"	4:02
4.	"Angel City, California"	2:54
5.	"Shows What You Know"	4:12
6.	"My Heart Won't Fall Again"	3:22
7.	"Another Man's Words"	4:51
8.	"Strike Your Light" (featuring Kamilah Marshall)	3:27
9.	"Before the Tear Drops"	3:26
10.	"If You Loved Me"	3:24
11.	"Another Baby"	2:35
12.	"Soul Serenity"	3:58
Total length:		42:52

== Charts ==
Chart (2015–2016)	Peak position
Austrian Albums (Ö3 Austria)	26
Belgian Albums (Ultratop Flanders)	100
Belgian Albums (Ultratop Wallonia)	96
Dutch Albums (Album Top 100)	44
French Albums (SNEP)	109
German Albums (Offizielle Top 100)	43
Scottish Albums (Official Charts)	7
Swiss Albums (Schweizer Hitparade)	6
UK Albums (Official Charts)	14
UK Americana Albums (Official Charts)	33
UK Album Downloads (Official Charts)	25
US Heatseekers Albums (Billboard)	3
US Tastemaker Albums (Billboard)	25
US Top Rock Albums (Billboard)	28
