= Vintage Trouble =

American rhythm and blues band

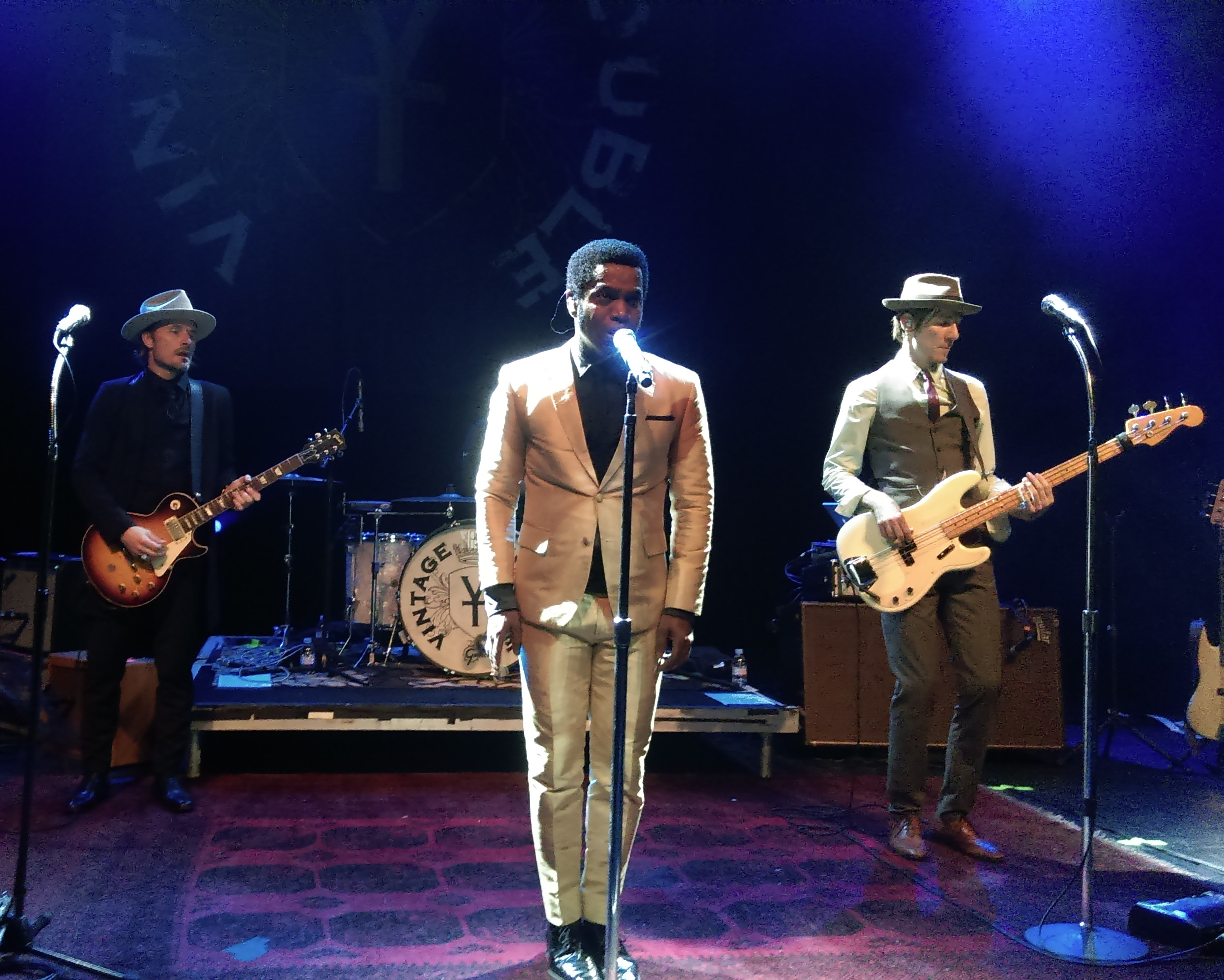
- Vintage Trouble performing in 2015

Background information
- Origin: Los Angeles, California, United States
- Genres: Blues, rhythm & blues, soul, rock and roll
- Years active: 2010–present
- Labels: Blue Note Records, Capitol Music Group
- Members: Ty Taylor; Nalle Colt; Rick Barrio Dill; Richard Danielson
- Website: vintagetrouble.com

Vintage Trouble (sometimes abbreviated as VT) is an American rhythm & blues band. The band formed in Hollywood, California, in 2010. They have released five albums: The Bomb Shelter Sessions (2011), The Swing House Acoustic Sessions (2014), 1 Hopeful Rd. (2015) Juke Joint Gems (2021), and Heavy Hymnal (2023). Their sound has been described as "retro", reminiscent of a number of late 1950s and 1960s blues and rock artists, such as the Rolling Stones, Chuck Berry and the Animals. One of their more well known songs called "Today is Pretty Great" was featured in a Honda Civic commercial with the artists seen at the very beginning for a few seconds.

== History ==
Ty Taylor (vocals) and Nalle Colt (guitar) formed Vintage Trouble after setting up a basic home studio in Venice Beach. They invited their mutual friend Rick Barrio Dill to play bass for the band, and then recruited Richard Danielson to play drums. "We got together in 2010", Taylor told Billboard. "It was one of those experiences where everything was lined up. We had all been friends, and had known each other before the band started up. We had known each other in different arenas. I had known Nalle Colt for about fourteen years, and we had tried to play with each other for so long. We were in one right before Vintage Trouble, and things just weren't working out. So, we left, and decided we wanted to do something a little more raw and down to earth." Taylor has said that the line-up of Colt, Danielson, Barrio Dill and himself developed a good chemistry: "It just felt like we were in a family of people that were going to challenge us."

The band then began creating material in the Laurel Canyon neighborhood of Los Angeles. After two weeks of rehearsals in early 2010, the group began playing local area shows and late-night speakeasies. Aiming to emulate mid-century soul music and to use the recording techniques of that era, the band spent a three-day session recording complete takes, turning out 12 new songs for the album The Bomb Shelter Sessions. Such singles as '"Gracefully", "Nancy Lee", "Still & Always Will" and "Blues Hand Me Down" aimed to produce a sound reminiscent of the days of vinyl records and juke joints, and the essence of the original soul movement. The album was produced by Peter McCabe and co-produced by Vintage Trouble themselves. The album was mixed by Rogers Masson.

They initially took their music outside the US, as part of a strategy conceived by manager Doc McGhee. "If you look at the history of people like Amy Winehouse, Duffy, or James Blunt, they came [to America] first and didn't make it. Then, they went back over to England, and blew up. We just decided to go to Europe first, and when they were accepted there, we would have a story to share here. That's basically what happened." McGhee wanted to get them in front of as many people as possible, and the strategy worked. "It was pretty simple. The concept was to get all the Troublemakers together, and those people spread the word. We got Brian May to give us some dates, and also some stadium shows with Bon Jovi. It's just hard work by these guys. They just get up in the morning, and go conquer," he said.

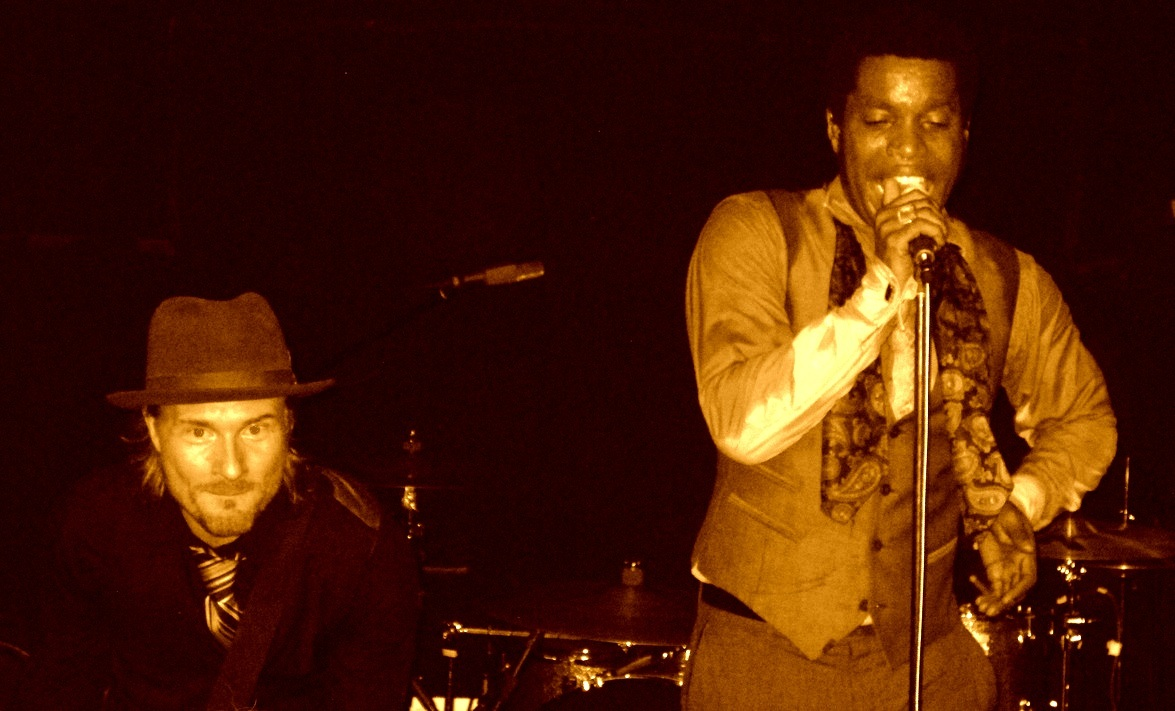
Colt and Taylor at Fibbers in 2011

After three shows in the UK in early 2011, the band returned in April of that year to appear on Jools Holland's late night TV show Later... with Jools Holland. The band became the sixth-most trending topic of the day on Twitter, attained the No. 13 best selling digital album on iTunes, and had the No. 5 all around best selling digital album on Amazon UK, beating out both Rihanna and the current Glee (TV series) albums. Additionally, they had the No. 2 best selling digital rock album on Amazon.com UK, and the No. 1 best selling R&B digital album on Amazon UK. On April 24, 2011, they appeared on The Late Show with JoAnne Good, (Sunday Night Sessions segment) on BBC London 94.9.

The band joined Brian May (guitar player of rock band Queen) and Kerry Ellis for a tour starting in early May 2011, and in June 2011 supported rock band Bon Jovi on the UK leg of their The Circle Tour.

On November 12, the band played at Malsis School, a private prep in North Yorkshire, England. The headmaster invited the band after seeing them on Later... with Jools Holland on BBC Two.

The band played for Paul Stanley on January 20, 2012, at his 60th birthday party and Stanley sang "You Shook Me" by Willie Dixon.

On April 24, 2012, The Bomb Shelter Sessions was released in the US.

They were the opening act for the Who on that band's first North American tour in four years. They also supported The Who on their European tour dates in summer 2013.

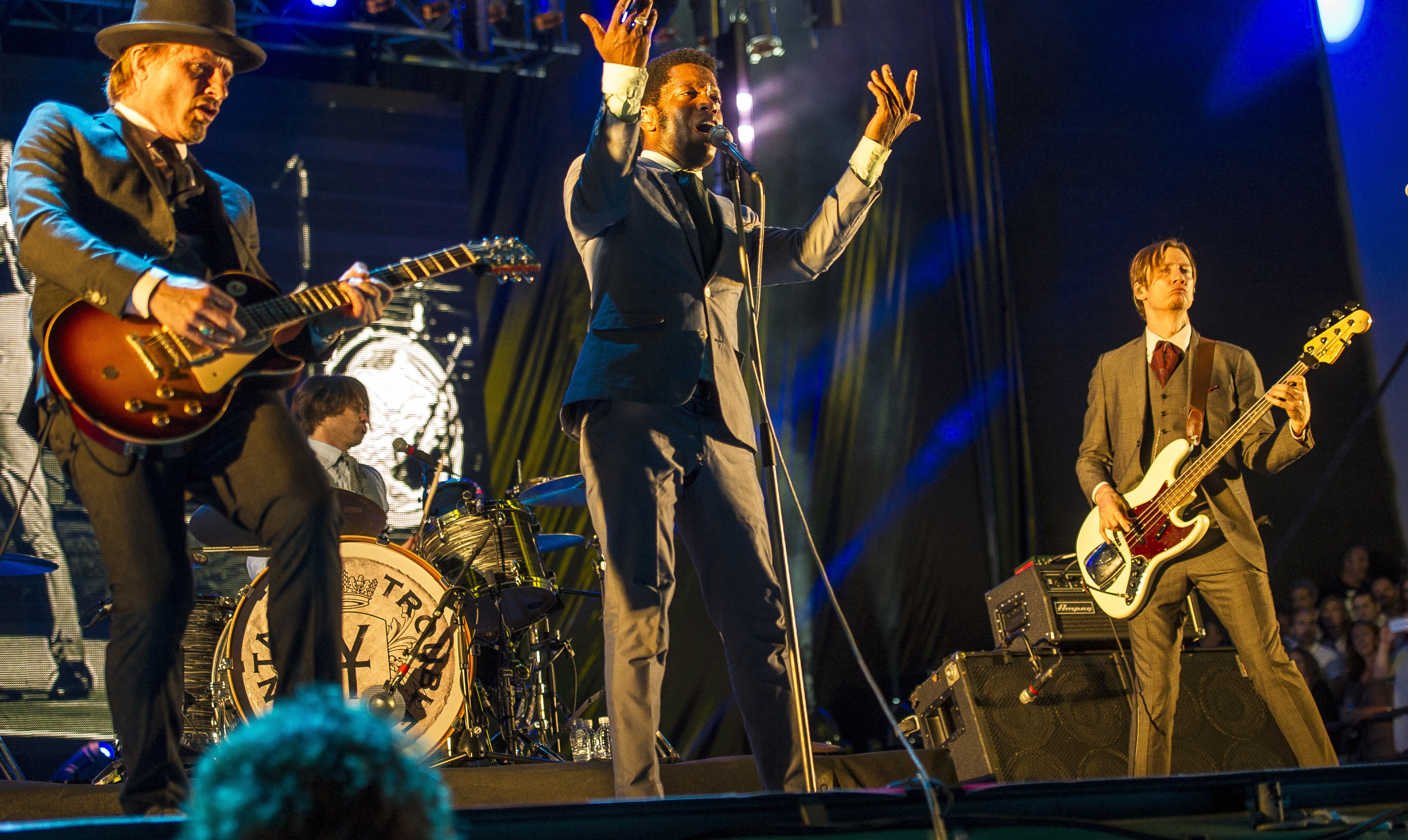
Vintage Trouble performing in 2014

They were the opening act for Dave Matthews Band at Oak Mountain Amphitheatre in Pelham, Alabama, on April 6, 2013.

The band appeared on The Tonight Show with Jay Leno on April 8, 2013, September 5, 2013, and on his penultimate show on February 5, 2014.

The band played at Houston's Free Press Summer Festival on June 1, 2013, and at Rock Werchter (Belgium) on July 4, 2013, which is their biggest festival up to date. They played at Chipotle Cultivate in Minneapolis, Minnesota, on August 23, 2014. They also played at Life Is Beautiful in Las Vegas, Nevada, on October 24, 2014. They appeared as the house band on The View for Whoopi Goldberg's birthday on November 12, 2014. The band supported Paloma Faith on her March 2015 arena tour.

The band in July 2015 supported AC/DC in Europe and North America during that band's Rock or Bust World Tour.

On October 6, 2015, the band traveled to Austin, Texas, and fulfilled a dream of theirs by playing at a live taping of Austin City Limits which was streamed live across the world.

In 2018, the band performed at the Black Music Festival in Girona, Spain. They released Chapter II - EP I, which was featured in Spotify's Blue Roots playlist. They headlined for the Eagle Rock Music Festival in October of that year and toured in Australia.

In 2019, Vintage Trouble toured across the Southern US. Kentucky-born singer-songwriter Kyle Daniel opened for them on half of the tour.

On February 6, 2024, the band announced via social media and also their website that they would be taking a hiatus "to focus on individual and family endeavors".

== Band members ==
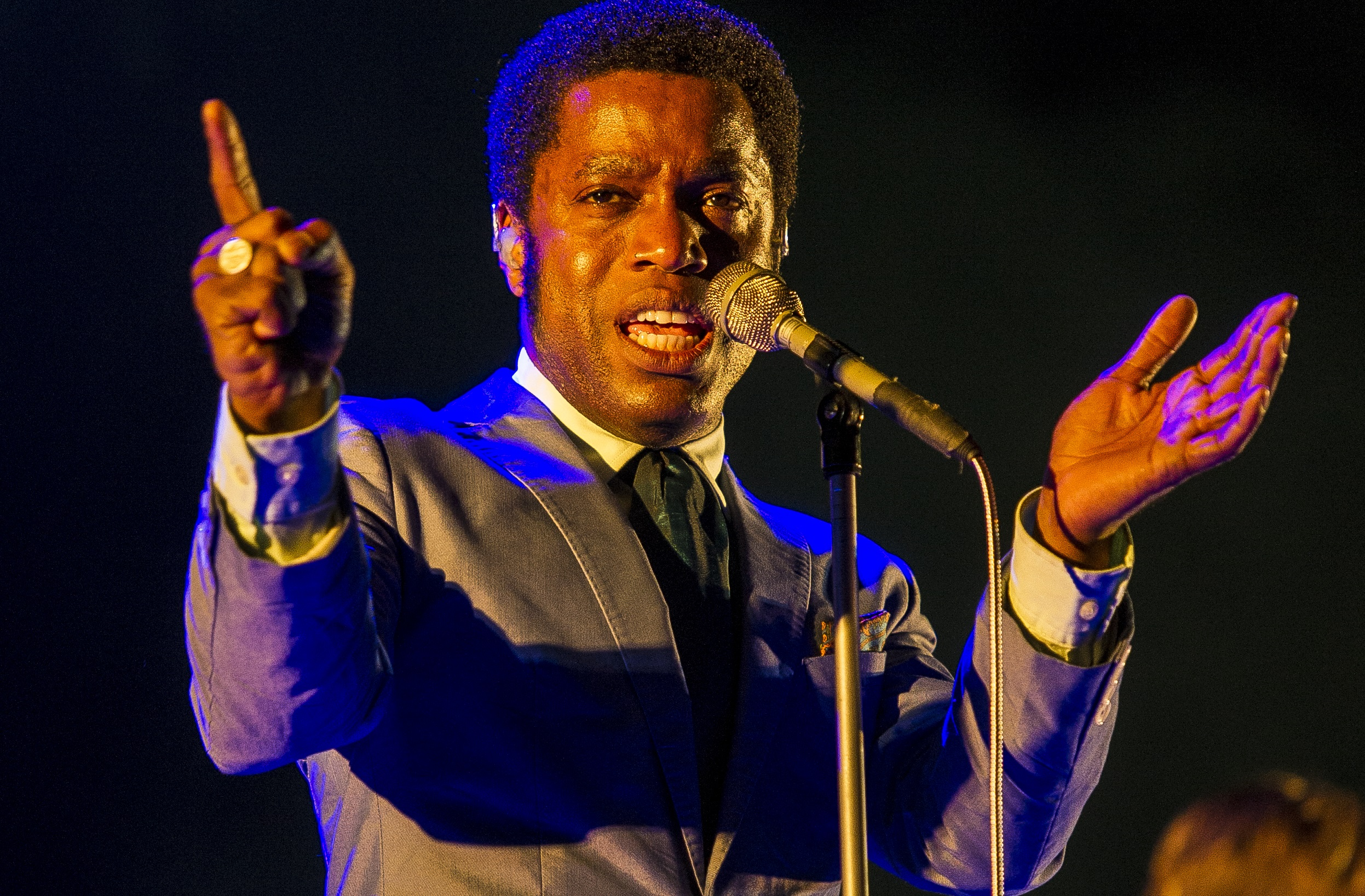
Ty Taylor in 2014

Current members

- Ty Taylor – lead vocals
- Nalle Colt – guitars, backing vocals
- Rick Barrio Dill – bass guitar, backing vocals
- Richard Danielson – drums, percussion, backing vocals

Live members

- Charlie Brumbly – backing vocals, harmonica (2010–2011)
- Brian London – keyboards, backing vocals (2017–present)

== Discography ==
- The Bomb Shelter Sessions (2011)
- The Swing House Acoustic Sessions (2014)
- 1 Hopeful Rd. (2015)
- Chapter II – EP I (2018)
- Chapter II – EP II (2019)
- Juke Joint Gems (2021)
- Heavy Hymnal (2023)
