= A Place to Land (Dakota Moon album) =

Studio album by Dakota Moon
- Released: February 2002
- Genre: R&B
- Label: Elektra
- Producer: Andrew Logan

Dakota Moon chronology
Dakota Moon (1998)	A Place to Land (2002)

Singles from A Place to Land
- 1. "Looking for a Place to Land" Released: 2002

Professional ratings
Review scores
Source	Rating
Allmusic	3/5 stars

A Place to Land is the second and final studio album by American R&B group Dakota Moon, released in February 2002 on Elektra Records.

The title track "Looking for a Place to Land" peaked at No. 30 on the Hot Adult Contemporary Tracks.

== Track listing ==
No.	Title	Writer(s)	Length
1.	"Looking for a Place to Land"	Dean, Malloy, Mann, Taylor	3:55
2.	"Keeps Me Comin' (Addiction)"	Artis, Dean, Logan	4:23
3.	"I'd Be a Fool"	Artis, Dean, Logan	4:06
4.	"Don't Give up on Me"	Artis, Cirince, Glover, Logan, Taylor	4:20
5.	"So Good for You"	Artis, Dean, Blades	4:02
6.	"Lonely Days"	Pierce, Taylor	4:14
7.	"Release Me"	Dean, Malloy, Taylor	3:41
8.	"Look at Me Now"	Logan, Reswick	4:16
9.	"Getaway Car"	Haase, Mann	3:34
10.	"Let Me Have It"	Kennedy, Kirkpatrick, Logan, Taylor	3:42
11.	"My Song"	Artis, Dean, Logan, Malloy, Taylor	4:40
