= Waylon Jennings (disambiguation) =

Waylon Jennings (1937–2002) was an American country music singer.

Waylon Jennings may also refer to:

- Waylon Jennings' 1977 arrest, an arrest made in August 1977 by the DEA of Jennings.
- Shooter Jennings (born 1979), Waylon's youngest child born Waylon Albright Jennings
- Waylon Jennings singles discography
- Waylon Jennings albums discography
  - Waylon, a 1970 studio album released by the singer
  - Waylon and Company, a 1983 studio album released by the singer
  - Waylon at JD's, his 1965 debut studio album
  - Waylon Live, his 1976 debut live album
  - Waylon & Willie, a 1978 collaborative album released between the singer and Willie Nelson
  - Ol' Waylon, a 1977 album released by the singer
- Waylon (TV special), a 1980 television special following Jennings along with James Garner and Jessi Colter
- Waylon: An Autobiography, a 1996 autobiography published by the singer, co-authored by Lenny Kaye

== See also ==
- Waylon (disambiguation)
- The Wailin' Jennys, a bluegrass and folk group founded in February 2002. Named after Waylon Jennings following the news of his passing that same month.
- Waymore's Liquor Store, a liquor store located in Waylon's hometown of Littlefield, Texas since 1971 owned and operated by his youngest sibling James D. Jennings and his wife Helen.
