= Honky Tonk Heroes =

Studio album by Waylon Jennings
- Released: June 25, 1973
- Recorded: 1973
- Studio: RCA Studio A (Nashville, Tennessee)
- Genre: Outlaw country
- Length: 27:21
- Label: RCA Victor
- Producer: Waylon Jennings; Tompall Glaser; Ronny Light; Ken Mansfield

Waylon Jennings chronology
| Lonesome, On'ry and Mean (1973) | Honky Tonk Heroes (1973) | This Time (1974) |

Singles from Honky Tonk Heroes
- 1. "We Had It All" Released: May 26, 1973; 2. "You Ask Me To" Released: October 4, 1973

Honky Tonk Heroes is the nineteenth studio album by Waylon Jennings, released in 1973 on RCA Victor. Most of the songs on the album were written or co-written by Billy Joe Shaver. The album is considered an important piece in the development of the outlaw sub-genre in country music as it revived the honky tonk music of Nashville and added elements of rock and roll.

Jennings had recently renegotiated his contract with RCA Records, granting him creative control over his work. As his usual producer, Chet Atkins, was reluctant to release a record consisting of songs written by newcomer Shaver, Jennings replaced Atkins with Tompall Glaser. Jennings recorded the album with his own band the Waylors.

Honky Tonk Heroes had a good reception by music critics. It reached number 14 in Billboard's Top Country albums chart. The singles "You Asked Me To" and "We Had It All" reached number 8 and 28. The album was listed in Robert Dimery's 1001 Albums You Must Hear Before You Die in 2005.

== Background ==
Waylon Jennings and his manager Neil Reshen had renegotiated the singer's contract with RCA Records in 1972, which gave him creative control over his work. By 1973, Atlantic Records was attempting to sign Jennings who, with fellow country singer Willie Nelson, had become dissatisfied with RCA because of the company's conservative influence upon their music. Nelson, who had signed with Atlantic, was becoming more popular, and this persuaded RCA to renegotiate with Jennings before it lost another potential success.

Jennings' creative input in the recording process had increased on the releases of Good Hearted Woman (1972), Ladies Love Outlaws (1972) and Lonesome, On'ry and Mean (1973). Jennings attempted to duplicate the sound of his live performances in the recording studio. He used his backing band, The Waylors, and his own choice of material.

== Recording and composition ==
"Willy The Wandering Gypsy and Me"
During the 1972 Dripping Springs Reunion concert, Billy Joe Shaver impressed Jennings with the song.

"Honky Tonk Heroes"
The song that entitled the album, written by Shaver.

Jennings met Billy Joe Shaver at the 1972 Dripping Springs Reunion in Dripping Springs, Texas. As Shaver took part on a guitar pull with other songwriters, he interpreted his original "Willy the Wondering Gypsy and Me". Jennings, who was resting at the back of the trailer, heard Shaver and asked him if he had written "any more of them 'ol cowboy songs". Impressed by Shaver's originals, Jennings offered him to record an entire album of his songs. Shaver then travelled to Nashville, Tennessee, where he tried to unsuccessfully locate Jennings, who avoided him for six months. With the help of local D.J. Roger "Captain Midnight" Schutt, Shaver found Jennings at a RCA recording session with producer Chet Atkins. He tried to confront the singer, who offered Shaver $100. Shaver refused the money and told Jennings that he was willing to fight him if he would not listen to his songs.

Jennings offered to record "Willy the Wandering Gypsy and Me" and told Shaver to sing another song – if Jennings liked it he would record it and Shaver could sing another; but if he did not like it, Shaver would have to leave. Shaver sang "Ain't No God in Mexico", followed by "Honky Tonk Heroes" and "Old Five and Dimers and Me". Jennings was impressed, and he decided to record an entire album of Shaver's songs.

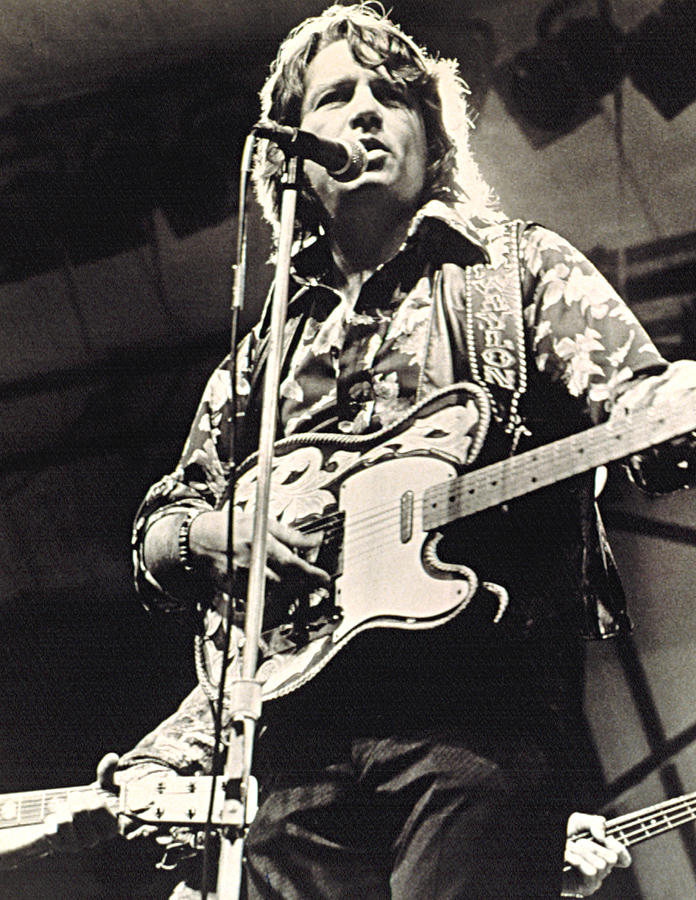
Jennings pictured in 1973

Atkins was reluctant to record the material of an unknown writer, but since he had creative control, Jennings decided to record the album. Jennings later recalled, "His songs were of a piece, and the only way you could ever understand Billy Joe was to hear his whole body of work. That was how the concept of Honky Tonk Heroes came about. Billy Joe talked the way a modern cowboy would speak, if he stepped out of the West and lived today. He had a command of the Texas lingo, his world as down to earth and real as the day was long, and he wore his Lone Star birthright like a badge." Jennings was also spending more of his time at Tompall Glaser's "Hillbilly Central" studio in Nashville. Jennings was attracted by the loose atmosphere of the studio in comparison to RCA Records'. Jennings brought Glaser with him to RCA Victor Studios to co-produce Honky Tonk Heroes. "Tompall and I were best friends," Jennings reminisced in his autobiography Waylon. "We met at about the time he broke up with his brothers, and I kind of took their place in his life." Jennings and Shaver worked on the songs for several weeks, with Shaver believing that Jennings was not closely following the phrasing of the tunes, and in some cases he played the songs repeatedly so that Jennings would understand them. The title cut was especially problematic, as Jennings and Shaver clashed over the arrangement. Jennings's drummer, Richie Albright, later recalled: "We were doing the album and Billy Joe was around, and we began 'Honky Tonk Heroes,' so we cut the first part of the song and we stopped, and Waylon said, 'This is the way we're going to do it.' And Billy Joe had been sitting in the back and he come walking up, saying, 'What are you doing? You're fucking up my song. That ain't the way it goes.' Pretty soon Waylon and Billy Joe are just hollering at one another. Billy Joe didn't understand the way we were putting it together...then we put it together and he said, 'Yeah. That's good. That's the way it goes.'"

Jennings and Shaver co-wrote the song "You Asked Me To" at Bobby Bare's office. Atkins' only input was his suggestion to add the song "We Had it All", which had previously been a top ten single. "We Had It All" had been written by Kris Kristofferson's keyboardist "Funky" Donnie Fritts. RCA requested Jennings to add a song not written by Shaver to improve the chances of commercial success for the album's single. Jennings initially considered Steve Young's "Seven Bridges Road," Jimmie Rodgers' "T for Texas," and Shel Silverstein's "The Leaving Coming On".

== Release and critical reception ==
Initially, the executives of RCA Records, and Chet Atkins, tried to avoid releasing the album. "We Had it All" was released as a single and it peaked at number 28 in Billboard's Country Singles. Also released as a single, "You Asked Me To" peaked at number eight. Honky Tonk Heroes was released in July 1973 to good critical reception. It reached number 14 in Billboard's Top Country Albums, while it peaked at number 185 in the Billboard 200.

Professional ratings
Review scores
| Source | Rating |
|---|---|
| The Music Journal | Favorable. |
| Stereo Review | Negative. |
| Chicago Tribune | Favorable. |
| Austin American-Statesman | Favorable. |
| El Paso Times | Favorable. |
| The Kansas City Star | Favorable. |

Rolling Stone wrote: "After many years of overproduction on record, Waylon Jennings' new album offers an opportunity to hear the crisp, robust no-nonsense sound which has been his trademark since his early days with Buddy Holly's Crickets." The Music Journal described the album as "certainly brash, lively and down-to-earth. Thoroughly infectious too." Regarding the composition of the songs, Stereo Review wrote: "Billy Joe Shaver songs have [Jennings] in a corral if not in a box...This is like picking Kris Kristofferson up by the literary ankles, shaking him vigorously, and using every damn nugget that tumbles out."

The Chicago Tribune opened its review by discussing Jennings's recent performances at The Troubadour and the Shower of Stars Concert, and his change of looks. The publication remarked that the singer appeared "raising his country consciousness but good: longish straggly hair, beginnings of a beard, black leather, laid back". For the reviewer Honky Tonk Heroes signified a "testimony to Jennings' directional attitude", as she considered the album "a pretty powerful example of both the old and 'new' Waylon", as the reviewers noted the change of looks reflected on the cover and the "music typical of the 'old' talent". Jennings was considered to be a "strong, vaguely sensitive singer " with a style "capable of crossing country lines to find wider acceptance". The piece opined that Shaver "deserves more recognition that he's so far received". It called his songs "simple, sometimes reminiscent of Mickey Newbury's in their gentle regret or dont-give-a-damn exuberance", as the review concluded that "They are songs of contemporary cowboys looking for a freedom they're never going to find".

For the Austin American-Statesman, reviewer Townsend Miller deemed the album a combination of his "favorite singer" in Jennings and the what he previously considered the "album of the year" on Shaver's release Old Five and Dimers Like Me. The reviewer recommended the readers to purchase both albums. El Paso Times opined that Honky Tonk Heroes "holds some of the best poetic humor and downright country sounds". The Baltimore Sun declared it "country music at its best". For The Kansas City Star, it offered "straight C&W minus the show biz pretension". The review called the songs "dusty, gritty and above all, honest", as it concluded that they were "like that first beer after a long day in the saddle".

== Legacy ==
Honky Tonk Heroes added to the "outlaw" image of Jennings, and the album is considered important in the development of the outlaw subgenre in country music. Shaver, who was regarded as a major contributor to the subgenre, considered the album "the touchstone of the Outlaw movement".

The album was reissued on CD in 1994 by RCA Records. Buddah Records reissued it on CD in 1999, while RCA records later reissued the album on LP, CD and digital download through Fat Possum Records in 2013.

=== Retrospective reviews ===
Professional ratings
Review scores
| Source | Rating |
|---|---|
| AllMusic | 5/5 stars |
| 1001 Albums You Must Hear Before You Die | Favorable |

Stephen Thomas Erlewine in a retrospective review in AllMusic felt that Jennings had been looking for a musical approach which had roots in country and rock, and Shaver's songs – "sketching an outlaw stance with near defiance and borrowing rock attitude to create the hardest country tunes imaginable" – provided that common ground. Erlewine believed that the album arrived at the right moment to revive the honky tonk music of Nashville by injecting a rock and roll attitude that would produce outlaw country.

Kenneth Burns, in Robert Dimery's 1001 Albums You Must Hear Before You Die, says that Honky Tonk Heroes is "one of country music's landmark albums", and points out Jennings' rock and roll roots as bass player for Buddy Holly. In 2013 author Michael Streissguth wrote, "The album christened country music's outlaw era...and bathed in risk, having gambled on the work of an untested songwriter."

== Track listing ==
All tracks are written by Billy Joe Shaver, except where noted

Side One
| No. | Title | Writer(s) | Length |
|---|---|---|---|
| 1. | "Honky Tonk Heroes" | | 3:36 |
| 2. | "Old Five and Dimers Like Me" | | 3:06 |
| 3. | "Willy the Wandering Gypsy and Me" | | 3:03 |
| 4. | "Low Down Freedom" | | 2:21 |
| 5. | "Omaha" | Billy Joe Shaver, Hillman Hall | 2:38 |

Side Two
| No. | Title | Writer(s) | Length |
|---|---|---|---|
| 1. | "You Ask Me To" | Billy Joe Shaver, Waylon Jennings | 2:31 |
| 2. | "Ride Me Down Easy" | | 2:38 |
| 3. | "Ain't No God in Mexico" | | 2:00 |
| 4. | "Black Rose" | | 2:29 |
| 5. | "We Had It All" | Troy Seals, Donnie Fritts | 2:44 |

Bonus tracks

1. "Slow Rollin' Low" – 2:44
2. "You Asked Me To" (Billy Joe Shaver, Waylon Jennings) – 2:38

== Personnel ==
Musicians

- Waylon Jennings – vocals, rhythm guitar
- Jerry Gropp, Larry Whitmore, Billy Reynolds, David Kirby, Eddie Hinton, Randy Scruggs, Steve Young – rhythm guitar
- Billy Sanford, Dale Sellers, Reggie Young – electric guitar
- Bee Spears, Henry Strzelecki – bass guitar
- Joe Allen – bass guitar, double bass
- David Briggs – piano
- Andy McMahon – organ
- Richie Albright, Buddy Harman, Willie Ackerman – drums
- Tommy Williams – fiddle
- Don Brooks – harmonica
- Ralph Mooney – steel guitar
- Brenton Banks, Larry Herzberg, Lennie Haight, Sheldon Kurland, Steven Maxwell Smith, Stephanie Woolf – violin
- Marvin Chantry – viola
- Byron Bach, Martha McCrory – cello

Production

- Tompall Glaser – producer
- Waylon Jennings – producer
- Ronny Light – producer on "Low Down Freedom" and "Black Rose"
- Al Pachucki, Tom Pick – recording engineer
- Chuck Seitz, Mike Shockley, Ray Butts, Roy Shockley – recording technicians
- Roger "Capt. Midnite" Schutt – liner notes
- Glen Spreen – string arrangement on "We Had It All"

== Chart positions ==
Album

Sales chart performance of Honky Tonk Heroes
| Chart (1973) | Peak position |
|---|---|
| US Top Country Albums (Billboard) | 14 |
| US Billboard 200 | 185 |

Singles

Sales chart performance of singles from Honky Tonk Heroes
| Song | Chart | Peak |
|---|---|---|
| "You Ask Me To" | US Hot Country Songs (Billboard) | 8 |
| "We Had it All" | US Hot Country Songs (Billboard) | 28 |
