= The Taker/Tulsa =

Studio album by Waylon Jennings
- Released: February 1971
- Recorded: 1969 – 1970
- Studios: RCA Studio A (Nashville, Tennessee); RCA (Hollywood, California)
- Genre: Country
- Length: 29:14
- Label: RCA Victor
- Producers: Danny Davis; Ronny Light

Waylon Jennings chronology
Singer of Sad Songs (1970)	The Taker/Tulsa (1971)	Cedartown, Georgia (1971)

The Taker/Tulsa is the fourteenth studio album by American country music artist Waylon Jennings, released in 1971 by RCA Records. The LP rose to #12 on the Billboard country albums chart while the single "The Taker" was a Top 5 hit single.

== Track listing ==
No.	Title	Writer(s)	Length
1.	"The Taker"	Kris Kristofferson, Shel Silverstein	2:29
2.	"You'll Look for Me"	Waylon Jennings	2:03
3.	"Mississippi Woman"	Red Lane	2:56
4.	"Lovin' Her Was Easier (Than Anything I'll Ever Do Again)"	Kristofferson	3:06
5.	"Six White Horses"	Bobby Bond	2:42
6.	"(Don't Let the Sun Set on You) Tulsa"	Wayne Carson Thompson	3:08
7.	"Casey's Last Ride"	Kristofferson	4:01
8.	"(I'd Be) A Legend in My Time"	Don Gibson	2:21
9.	"Sunday Morning Comin' Down"	Kristofferson	3:54
10.	"Grey Eyes You Know"	Harlan Howard, Gene Myers	2:34
