= Good Hearted Woman (song) =

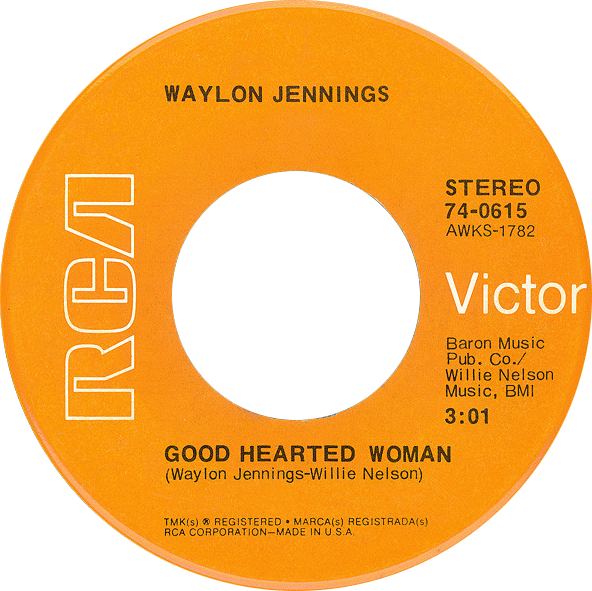
- US single of Jennings's 1971 solo recording

Single by Waylon Jennings

from the album Good Hearted Woman
- B-side: "It's All Over Now"
- Released: December 14, 1971
- Recorded: September 1, 1971
- Genre: Country
- Length: 3:01
- Label: RCA Victor
- Songwriters: Waylon Jennings; Willie Nelson
- Producer: Ronny Light

Waylon Jennings singles chronology
"Cedartown, Georgia" (1971)	"Good Hearted Woman" (1971)	"Sweet Dream Woman" (1972)

Duet recording
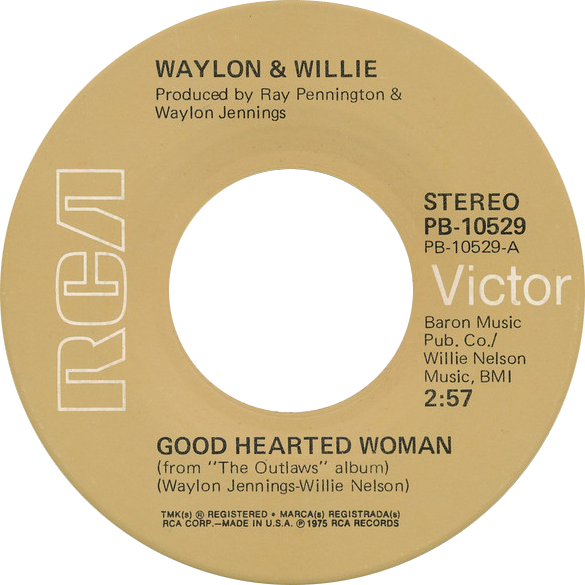
- 1976 US single of Jennings and Nelson's duet performance

"Good Hearted Woman" is a song written by American country music singers Waylon Jennings and Willie Nelson.

== Writing ==
In 1969, while staying at the Fort Worther Motel in Fort Worth, Texas, Jennings saw an advertisement in a newspaper promoting Tina Turner as a "good hearted woman loving two-timing men", a reference to Ike Turner. Jennings went to talk to Nelson, who was in a middle of a poker game, about writing a song based on that phrase. Joining the game, he and Nelson expanded the lyrics as Nelson's wife Connie Koepke wrote them down.

== Recording ==
Jennings recorded the song for the first time as the title track of his 1972 album Good Hearted Woman, the single peaked at number three on the Billboard Hot Country Singles chart. Jennings had recorded a concert version for Waylon Live, which served as a basis for the duet with Nelson. "I just took my voice off and put Willie's on in different places," he explained. "Willie wasn't within 10,000 miles when I recorded it." He also added canned crowd noises to add to the live feel for the album Wanted: The Outlaws!. The album cemented the pair's outlaw image and became country music's first platinum album. The song peaked at number one on Billboard's Hot Country Singles chart and number 25 on the Billboard Hot 100. The song won the Single of the Year award in the 1976 Country Music Association Awards, and took Jennings and Nelson to a mainstream audience, giving them nationwide recognition.

== Charts ==
=== Waylon Jennings ===
Chart (1971–1972)	Peak position
US Hot Country Songs (Billboard)	3
Canadian RPM Country Tracks	1

=== Waylon Jennings and Willie Nelson ===
Chart (1976)	Peak position
US Hot Country Songs (Billboard)	1
US Billboard Hot 100	25
US Adult Contemporary (Billboard)	16
Canadian RPM Country Tracks	5
Canadian RPM Adult Contemporary Tracks	6

=== Year-end charts ===
Chart (1976)	Position
US Hot Country Songs (Billboard)	2

== Cover versions ==
- Mel Street recorded a version for his 1972 album, Borrowed Angel.
- Ernest Tubb sang the song on his 1972 album, Say Something Nice to Sarah.
- In 1976, a duet version of "Good Hearted Woman" performed by Waylon Jennings and Willie Nelson became the first of three number ones on the country chart for the duo.
- In 1981 Michal Tučný created Czech version under name Báječná ženská.
- Marty Robbins recorded a version for his 1981 album, The Legend.
- Tina Turner recorded song for her 1988 album Goes Country.
- Micky and the Motorcars (with Cody and Willy Braun) recorded a version for Cross Canadian Ragweed's "The Red River Tribute" to Waylon Jennings (2003)
- The 2005 album Texas Fed, Texas Bred: Redefining Country Music, Volume 1 includes a cover version performed by Guy Clark.
- LeAnn Rimes recorded a version of the song for her 2011 release, Lady & Gentlemen.
- Hank Williams III recorded a version of the song, later released on 2012's Long Gone Daddy.
- Marty Stuart and Travis Tritt performed the song for Jerry Bradley at the induction ceremony of Jerry Bradley into the Country Music Hall of Fame in 2019.
- George Jones recorded it and included in his 1980 album I Am What I Am.
