= Rush Street =

Rush Street may refer to

- Rush Street (album), a 1991 album by Richard Marx
- Rush Street, Chicago, Illinois, U.S.
- Rush Street Gaming, a casino company founded by Neil Bluhm and Greg Carlin which operates Rivers Casino
- Rush Street Interactive, an iGaming services company founded in 2012 and listed on the NYSE with the stock ticker RSI

== See also ==
- "Rush Street Blues", a 1966 Waylon Jennings song from Nashville Rebel
