= Folk-Country =

Studio album by Waylon Jennings
- Released: March 14, 1966
- Recorded: March – July 1965
- Studios: RCA Victor (Nashville, Tennessee)
- Genre: Country
- Length: 29:06
- Label: RCA Victor
- Producer: Chet Atkins

Waylon Jennings chronology
Waylon at JD's (1964)	Folk-Country (1966)	Leavin' Town (1966)

Folk-Country is the second studio album and major-label debut by American country music artist Waylon Jennings, released in 1966 on RCA Victor. It is his first collaboration with producer Chet Atkins.

== Background ==
According to the book Outlaw: Waylon, Willie, Kris, and the Renegades of Nashville, Chet Atkins first heard of Jennings through comedian Don Bowman, who had worked with Waylon on the radio in Lubbock, and country singer Bobby Bare. In March 1965, the singer made his first recordings for RCA in what would be a moderately successful but increasingly frustrated artistic partnership. In the authorized Jennings documentary Renegade Outlaw Legend, Jennings recalled that at the time he was in awe of the legendary Atkins: "That's God's right hand as far as country music. When you walked in there, the most important thing in your life is to impress him."

The album bears little resemblance to the sound Jennings would pioneer in the 1970s as part of the "outlaw" movement, with Atkins tempering Waylon's assertive vocal style and surrounding him with the hallmarks of the "Nashville sound" that had been enormously successful for previous RCA artists like Patsy Cline and Jim Reeves. Author Michael Striessguth observes in his book Outlaws:

"Chet threw plenty of Waylon's records against the wall and more than a few stuck...Waylon in the mid-1960s was controlled, even gentle, which helped put over the polite sound that defined much of his repertoire, but not his true style...So Waylon's early hits found him reaching for distant places in his range on songs such as Harlan Howard's "Another Bridge to Burn", Don Bowman's "Now Everybody Knows" and Waylon's own arrangement of "Man of Constant Sorrow", all of them drenched in background vocals as if they were Jim Reeves records."

The album contains four songs written or co-written by Jennings as well as four songs composed by songwriter Harlan Howard. In an uncharacteristic move, Atkins allowed Jennings to use members of his band the Waylors on the recording, something that would rarely be permitted again, much to Waylon's annoyance. Atkins marketed Jennings to the folk-pop audience, calling the album Folk-Country, as folk music was experiencing a renaissance on college campuses throughout the country, but the majority of the songs were mostly country-pop. As Jennings recalled later, "Folk-Country was Nashville's scheme to snare some of the hootenanny folk audience, which was then starting to cross over to rock...I didn't mind the label; to me, folk music was the original country music, sung by folks, plain and simple." The catchy, up-tempo ”Stop the World (And Let Me Off)”, which was released as a single for the album (peaking at #16), would remain a part of Jennings' live show for years.

== Critical reception ==
Professional ratings
Review scores
Source	Rating
AllMusic	link

Folk-Country peaked at No. 9 on the Billboard country album chart. AllMusic: "Folk-Country is Waylon's true debut album for the RCA label, and while it is very much embryonic in terms of its revelation of the mature Jennings sound, its roots are clearly audible and the material, while safe, is more than satisfying...The single 'Stop the World (And Let Me Off)' is indicative of the kind of countrypolitan fare Atkins was developing at the label. And while this is only 1966, the listener can hear Jennings stretching the song to its limits - at least the limits imposed by a mainstream country single."

== Track listing ==
No.	Title	Writer(s)	Length
1.	"Another Bridge to Burn"	Harlan Howard	2:41
2.	"Stop the World (And Let Me Off)"	Carl Belew, W. S. Stevenson	2:03
3.	"Cindy of New Orleans"	Waylon Jennings	1:59
4.	"Look into My Teardrops"	Don Bowman, Howard	2:21
5.	"Down Came the World"	Bozo Darnell, Jennings	2:17
6.	"I Don't Mind"	Howard, Richard E. Johnson	2:55
7.	"Just for You"	Jennings, Bowman, Jerry Williams	2:11
8.	"Now Everybody Knows"	Bowman	2:39
9.	"That's the Chance I'll Have to Take"	Jennings	2:05
10.	"What Makes a Man Wander"	Harlan Howard	2:37
11.	"Man of Constant Sorrow"	Traditional	2:44
12.	"What's Left of Me"	Howard	2:33

== Personnel ==
- Waylon Jennings - guitar, vocals
- Kenny Buttrey - drums
- Richie Albright - drums
- Buddy Harman - drums
- Jerry Gropp - guitar
- Fred Carter - guitar
- Jerry Reed - electric guitar
- Pete Wade - guitar
- Floyd Cramer - piano
- Hargus Robbins - piano
- Ray Stevens (Harold Ragsdale) - piano, vibraphone
- Bob Moore - bass
- Henry Strzelecki - bass
- Paul Foster - bass
- Anita Kerr Singers - backing vocals
- Anita Carter, Dorothy Dilliard, Louis Nunley, William Guilford Wright Jr. - chorus

Technical

- Bill Vandervort, Jim Malloy - engineer
