= Lonesome, On'ry and Mean =

Studio album by Waylon Jennings
- Released: March 1973
- Recorded: April 1970 – December 1972
- Studio: RCA Victor, Nashville, Tennessee
- Genre: Outlaw Country
- Length: 33:07
- Label: RCA Victor
- Producer: Ronny Light; Waylon Jennings; Danny Davis

Waylon Jennings chronology
Ladies Love Outlaws (1972)	Lonesome, On'ry and Mean (1973)	Honky Tonk Heroes (1973)

Lonesome, On'ry and Mean is the eighteenth studio album by American country music artist Waylon Jennings, released on RCA Victor in 1973. It was, after Good Hearted Woman and Ladies Love Outlaws, the third in a series of albums which were to establish Jennings as one of the most prominent representatives of the outlaw country movement. Like its successor, Honky Tonk Heroes, the album is considered an important milestone in the history of country music. It represented the first of Jennings' works produced and recorded by himself, following his fight for artistic freedom against the constraints of the Nashville recording establishment.

Photographer Mick Rock shot the album's cover.

== Background ==
By the spring of 1972, Jennings was burned out. Suffering from hepatitis that he contracted while playing an Indian reservation in New Mexico, he took stock of where he was in his life and career and seriously considered retiring. Although Jennings had enjoyed a respectable run on the country charts, he felt hemmed in creatively and fumed when RCA told him where and how to record. In the audio version of his autobiography Waylon, he reflected:

"Lyin' there, I started to thinkin' about what I'd won after ten years of bangin' around the honky tonks: my health was shot; I was close to a quarter of a million dollars in debt, and getting deeper in the hole whether I played shows or not; the I.R.S. was on my tail; and I was paying alimony to three wives. If I went on the road I lost money, if I stayed home I lost more. As for record sales, I never got ahead of...the packaging fees, and the overseas split, and the studio costs...You couldn't figure who owed what or why."

In the authorized video biography Renegade Outlaw Legend, Jennings recalled that he approached RCA and asked for an advance on royalties, which they agreed to initially, but later came back with a lesser offer of $5,000 on the condition that Jennings sign with the label for another five years. Around this time, Jennings was visited by his long-time drummer Richie Albright, who was surprised at how depressed Jennings was and incensed at what he saw as a lack of respect from RCA. It was Albright who arranged a meeting with Neil Reshen, a business manager at the rock magazine Creem who handled the careers of jazz legend Miles Davis and rock iconoclast Frank Zappa. Reshen, who would also sign Willie Nelson at Jennings' recommendation, was unimpressed by Nashville's tight inner circle and brought his no-nonsense approach to the negotiations with RCA bosses Jerry Bradley and Chet Atkins. In his memoir, Jennings wrote that the final meeting between the two parties in Chet Atkins' office hit a stalemate over $25,000 and nobody uttered a word for several minutes. Jennings, who needed to go to the bathroom, got up and left the office. On his way back from the bathroom Reshen met him in the hall. "You're a friggin' genius," Reshen exclaimed, "walking out like that! That sewed it up. Where'd you go?" "I had to take a piss," Jennings replied. "Well," said Reshen, "that was a $25,000 piss." As author Joe Nick Patoski observes in his book Willie Nelson, Reshen "stayed in Bradley's face and in Chet Atkins's face. His real aim was to get Waylon off RCA and onto Columbia Records, where he had a relationship with label chief Clive Davis, but RCA let Waylon and his fourth wife, Jessi Colter, have their own custom label, WGJ." According to the 2013 book Outlaw: Waylon, Willie, Kris, and the Renegades of Nashville, Jennings wound up with a deal that was unprecedented for a Nashville recording artist, including the freedom to produce his own records wherever he wanted, an advance that hovered around seventy-five thousand dollars, and an 8 percent royalty rate. With the artistic freedom he had been pining for, Jennings began recording Lonesome, On'ry and Mean in late 1972.

== Critical reception ==
Professional ratings
Review scores
Source	Rating
Allmusic	link
Christgau's Record Guide	B

Lonesome On'ry and Mean peaked at #8 on the Billboard country albums chart. In the LP's original liner notes, Chet Flippo of Rolling Stone wrote, "There's nothing faddish or contrived or artificial about him. If he sings it, you can believe it. Hank Williams had that rare gift and so does Waylon Jennings." AllMusic calls it "the quintessential Waylon Jennings outlaw record."

Music journalist Kelefa Sanneh said the album, "encouraged fans to think of Jennings not as an old Nashville pro but as a new kind of country antihero - as much a part of the counter-culture, in his own way, as the hippies".

== Track listing ==
No.	Title	Writer(s)	Length
1.	"Lonesome, On'ry and Mean"	Steve Young	3:41
2.	"Freedom to Stay"	Will Hoover	3:13
3.	"Lay It Down"	Gene Thomas	3:19
4.	"Gone to Denver"	Johnny Cash, Red Lane	2:32
5.	"Good Time Charlie's Got the Blues"	Danny O'Keefe	3:24
6.	"You Can Have Her"	Bill Cook	2:44
7.	"Pretend I Never Happened"	Willie Nelson	3:05
8.	"San Francisco Mabel Joy"	Mickey Newbury	3:51
9.	"Sandy Sends Her Best"	Billy Ray Reynolds	2:37
10.	"Me and Bobby McGee"	Kris Kristofferson, Fred Foster	4:41

=== Bonus tracks ===
1. "Laid Back Country Picker" (Vince Matthews, Jim Casey) – 3:16
2. "The Last One to Leave Seattle" (Waylon Jennings, Steve Norman) – 3:27
3. "Big, Big Love" (Ray Carroll, Wynn Stewart) – 2:26

== Personnel ==
- Fred Carter, David Kirby, Dale Sellers, Billy Sanford - electric guitar
- Billy Ray Reynolds, Chip Young, Jimmy Capps, John Buck Wilkin, Larry Whitmore, Randy Scruggs, Charlie McCoy - acoustic guitar
- Ralph Mooney, Pete Drake - steel guitar
- Bobby Dyson, Henry Strzelecki, Don Smith, Lee Miller, Roy Huskey Jr., Norbert Putnam - bass
- Hargus Pig Robbins, David Briggs, Henry Strzelecki - piano
- Billy Sanford - organ
- Jerry Carrigan, Buddy Harman, Willie Ackerman, Larrie Londin, Richie Albright - drums
- Don Brooks, Charlie McCoy - harmonica
- Byron Bach, David Vanderkooi - cello
- Marvin Chantry, Gary Vanosdale - viola
- Brenton Banks, George Binkley, Lennie Haight, Sheldon Kurland - violin
- Lea Jane Bernati, Ginger Holladay, Mary Holladay - vocals
- Glen Spreen - string arrangements on "You Can Have Her"

Technical

- Bill Vandervort, Les Ladd, Tom Pick - engineer
- David Roys, Mike Shockley, Roy Shockley - technicians
- Mick Rock - cover photography
