= Flying W logo =

Logo of Waylon Jennings

- David Hogan's copyrighted initial design from 1977, still in use today

- Redesign used from 1999-2002. Original logo brought back following Waylon's death in February 2002.
- Product type: Logo
- Current owner: The Trustees of the Wayland Arnold Jennings Revocable Trust
- Produced by: Waylon Jennings (initial sketch); David Hogan (final design)
- Country: United States of America
- Introduced: Filed: August 9, 1977; 49 years ago First Use in Commerce: September 1, 1978; 48 years ago on the back cover of the Waylon Jennings album I've Always Been Crazy
- Markets: Music merchandise etc.
- Previous owners: WGJ Productions, Inc.
- Registered as a trademark in: United States Patent and Trademark Office Registration Number: 73768617 Description of Mark: The Mark Consists of the word "Waylon" and the letter "W" in the form of a bird. Filing Date: December 1, 1986 Registration Date: August 4, 1987; U.S. Registration No. 4,623,461 (W design; clothing), filed August 28, 2013.; U.S. Registration No. 4,623,462 (WAYLON W; clothing), filed August 28, 2013.; U.S. Registration No. 4,623,463 (W design; musical recordings), filed August 28, 2013.; U.S. Registration No. 4,630,897 (W design; internet streaming services), filed August 28, 2013.
- Website: Logo at WaylonShop.com

The Flying W logo or alternatively the Waylon Jennings logo, the Flying Eagle logo, or the Soaring Eagle logo, is a logo designed by American art designer and director David Hogan for country musician Waylon Jennings in August 1977. It has been called one of the most recognizable logos in country music history. The logo has remained on numerous post-1977 albums, singles, merchandising, as well as his stage sets used in his lifetime.

== History ==
=== Creation ===
Original Waylon wordmark logo used from 1973 to 1978.

The origins of the logo are widely disputed, with at least 3 different accounts having been given by those close to Jennings. According to Jennings' former publicist Bill Conrad, it originated as a design for a belt buckle during the late 1970s. He would state that RCA Records had produced a limited run of 250 belt buckles featuring Jennings' earlier script logo, first used on his 1973 album Lonesome, On'ry and Mean. The word "Superbilly" was featured inside the buckle, resembling the Superman textual logo. After trying to produce additional buckles through Lewis Buckles of Chicago, Conrad decided to develop a new logo design that could also be marketed through Jennings' merchandise.

Conrad commissioned Nashville graphic designer David Hogan to develop several designs for the buckle. Hogan at the time was primarily working in album cover art design, having created covers for numerous musicians, including Jennings, Willie Nelson, Chet Atkins, David Allan Coe, Ronnie Milsap and Bill Monroe. Hogan returned later with three proposed designs. Conrad displayed the rough drafts in Jennings' office and later asked Jennings along with drummer Richie Albright to select one for the proposed buckle. Jennings selected the design that subsequently became known as the Flying W.

Initial filings from August 9, 1977 by David Hogan for the rough draft of the logo.

Other accounts differ from this story however. Jessi Colter, Waylon's wife, and their son Shooter Jennings have said Waylon designed the logo himself. They would state he sketched the logo while on his tour bus at some point, before Hogan would finalize the design.

Hogan himself, however, has disputed both of the other accounts. In 2012, Hogan stated that he had no recollection of a Bill Conrad and "Does Waylon look like he ever picked up a pencil?" to Colter, which drew the ire of many.

Terry Jennings, Waylon's oldest son would later recount that Jennings had intentionally turned the Eagle's head to face the West to represent his home in West Texas in Littlefield, Texas.

== Usage and merchandise ==
Single cover to "Don't You Think This Outlaw Bit's Done Got Out of Hand" released in October 1978.

The logo was subsequently used on merchandise, stage sets, and other material throughout the rest of his career. The logos first use commercially was on the back cover to Jennings' 1978 album I've Always Been Crazy and was used on the single cover to "Don't You Think This Outlaw Bit's Done Got Out of Hand" in October that year. It was used the next year on the front cover to his 1979 album What Goes Around Comes Around.

Jennings’ Fender Custom Shop signature series Telecaster on display in 2008, with the logo featured on the twelfth fret.

The emblem was later incorporated into instruments associated with Jennings. In the early-1990s, the Fender Custom Shop constructed a prototype Fender Telecaster for Jennings based on his 1963 Telecaster. The instrument featured the logo inlaid into the twelfth fret and became the prototype for the Fender Waylon Jennings Tribute Series, that was introduced in 1995.

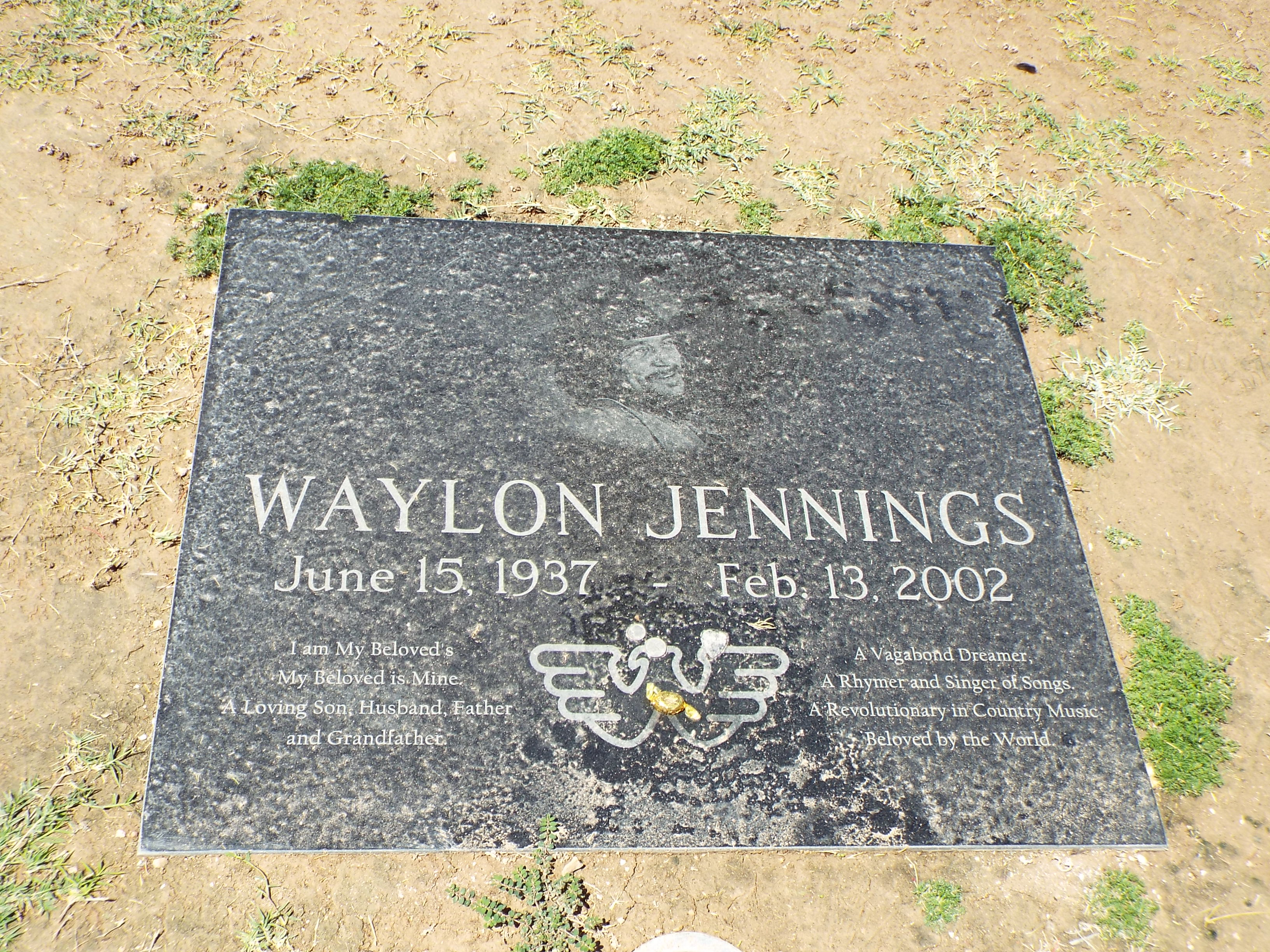
Jennings' grave pictured in April 2016.

The logo was incorporated into his headstone at the City of Mesa Cemetery in Mesa, Arizona after his death in February 2002.

== See also ==
- Tongue and lips logo, logo of The Rolling Stones
- Yes bubble logo, logo of the band Yes
