= Cedartown, Georgia (album) =

Studio album by Waylon Jennings
- Released: August 1971
- Recorded: 1968–1971
- Studios: RCA Studio A (Nashville, Tennessee)
- Genre: Country
- Length: 28:53
- Label: RCA Victor
- Producers: Danny Davis; Chet Atkins; Ronny Light

Waylon Jennings chronology
The Taker/Tulsa (1971)	Cedartown, Georgia (1971)	Good Hearted Woman (1972)

Professional ratings
Review scores
Source	Rating
Allmusic	link

Cedartown, Georgia is the fifteenth studio album by American country music artist Waylon Jennings, released in 1971 by RCA Records.

== Critical reception ==
The album peaked at #27 on the Billboard country albums chart, his fourth LP in a row that failed to crack the Top 10. Thom Jurek of AllMusic praises Jennings' performances but disparages the production of Danny Davis: "The window dressing added by Davis waters down its impact and makes Jennings' job as a singer more difficult... Cedartown, Georgia feels just like what it is, a decent collection of songs and inspired performances marred by production nonsense. Indeed, a quick listen to the album and it becomes difficult to see why Davis worked with Jennings at all."

== Track listing ==
No.	Title	Writer(s)	Length
1.	"Cedartown, Georgia"	Mack Vickery, Sammi Smith, Charlie Cobble	2:48
2.	"Big D"	Jan Crutchfield	2:29
3.	"The House Song"	Paul Stookey, Robert Bannard	3:29
4.	"Tomorrow Night in Baltimore"	Kenny Price	3:03
5.	"Pickin' White Gold"	Fred Carter	2:34
6.	"Bridge Over Troubled Water" (with Jessi Colter)	Paul Simon	3:56
7.	"It's All Over Now"	Jessi Colter	2:32
8.	"I'm Gonna Leave (While I Still Love You)"	Martha Sharp	3:05
9.	"I've Got Eyes for You"	Del Shannon, Brian Hyland	2:35
10.	"Let Me Stay Awhile"	Mickey Newbury	2:22
