= Sweet Dream Woman =

Single by Waylon Jennings

from the album Good Hearted Woman
- B-side: "Sure Didn't Take Him Long"
- Released: June 10, 1972
- Genre: Country
- Length: 3:00
- Label: RCA Victor
- Songwriter(s): Chip Taylor, Al Gorgoni
- Producer(s): Ronny Light

Waylon Jennings singles chronology
"Good Hearted Woman" (1972)	"Sweet Dream Woman" (1972)	"Pretend I Never Happened" (1972)

"Sweet Dream Woman" is a song written by Chip Taylor and Al Gorgoni, and recorded by American country music artist Waylon Jennings. Jennings cut the song in September and October 1971 at RCA Studios in Nashville, with Ronny Light producing. That recording was released in June 1972 as the second single from the album Good Hearted Woman. The song reached number 7 on the Billboard Hot Country Singles & Tracks chart.

== Personnel ==
- Waylon Jennings — vocals, guitar
- Fred Carter Jr. — guitar
- Dale Sellers — guitar
- Chip Young — guitar
- Ralph Mooney — steel guitar
- Andy McMahon — organ
- Bobby Dyson, Henry Strzelecki — bass
- Kenny Buttrey, Buddy Harman — drums
- Dolores Edgin, Ginger Holladay, June Page, Temple Riser — vocals

== Chart performance ==
Chart (1972)	Peak position
US Hot Country Songs (Billboard)	7
Canadian RPM Country Tracks	3
