= Nashville Rebel (film) =

1966 film

- Promotional poster
- Directed by: Jay J. Sheridan
- Written by: Ira Kerns; Jay J. Sheridan
- Produced by: Fred A. Niles
- Starring: Waylon Jennings; Mary Frann; Gordon Oas-Heim; CeCe Whitney; Thurman R. Stevens, Sr.
- Music by: Robert Blanford
- Distributed by: American International Pictures
- Release date: January 1, 1966
- Running time: 95 minutes
- Country: United States
- Language: English

Nashville Rebel is a 1966 motion picture starring Waylon Jennings, Mary Frann, Gordon Oas-Heim, and CeCe Whitney. The name is the same as a 2006 compilation DVD of Jennings' TV performances released by RCA Records to accompany the four-disc Nashville Rebel anthology.

== Plot ==
Arlin Grove (Waylon Jennings) has just finished a hitch in the Army and finds he is stranded in the small town of Morgan's Corner after being robbed by drunken rednecks. Grove is taken in by pretty Molly Morgan (Mary Frann) and her father, and before long, Molly becomes infatuated with the rugged stranger while nursing him back to health.

Arlin and Molly soon marry, and after playing a few songs at a local honky-tonk, Grove becomes a professional musician when he is offered $75 a week for a standing Saturday-night gig. Word about Grove begins to spread, and entertainment lawyer Wesley Lang (Gordon Oas-Heim) offers to take over his management and take him to the big time. Lang's paramour Margo (CeCe Whitney) helps give Arlin's act some polish, andsoon, the singer is knocking them dead on the country circuit, and even playing the Grand Ole Opry.

Lang takes it upon himself to break up Arlin and Molly's marriage, convinced it would be better for Grove's career if he were single, and Molly, now expecting a baby, is left heartbroken. Arlin soon finds himself on the other side of Lang's machinations when the manager wrongly suspects his new client is having an affair with Margo; Lang sabotages Grove with a booking at a ritzy supper club, and thinking his career is over, Grove turns to the bottle. An apologetic Margo consoles Arlin, and helps him get back to Molly.

== Cast ==
- Waylon Jennings as Arlin Grove
- Mary Frann as Molly Morgan
- Tex Ritter as Himself
- Sonny James as Himself
- Loretta Lynn as Herself
- Porter Wagoner as Himself
- The Wilburn Brothers as Singers
- Faron Young as Himself
- Henny Youngman as Himself
- Chet Atkins as Himself
- Archie Campbell as Himself
- Clell Summey as Cousin Jody (credited as Cousin Jody and the Country Cousin)
- Ralph Emery as Himself, Grand Ole Opry Announcer
- Ott Devine as Himself, Grand Ole Opry Manager
- Gordon Oas-Heim as Wesley Lang
- Thurman Roosevelt Stevens Jr. as Butler
- CeCe Whitney as Margo Powell
- Doyle Wilburn as Himself
- Teddy Wilburn as Himself
- The Country Gentlemen as Singers

== Aftermath ==
While the film was a modest success, it was the only movie that featured Waylon Jennings as a lead actor. Waylon stated in his autobiography (1994, Warner Books) that his performances were not as good as they could have been, and cautioned fans against seeing the film. Eventually, Waylon stopped playing "Green River" (issued as a single by RCA Victor) in his live performances.

Several years later, the film's title became prophetic; Waylon (along with several other country artists) began to openly rebel against Nashville's producer-oriented approach to making records. The film was pulled from television distribution in the mid-1970s, and despite the major surge in Waylon's popularity at that time, Nashville Rebel was neither seen on TV nor was officially released on home video until the mid–1990s.

== Ownership ==
Upon release in 1966, Nashville Rebel was billed as a co-production between Fred A. Niles Productions and Nashville-based Show Biz, Inc., and distributed by American International Pictures. At some point, ownership of the film fell solely into the hands of Show Biz. Unfortunately, the assets of Show Biz lay dormant throughout the mid-1980s until the mid-1990s.

In the early 1990s, the video and film assets of Show Biz, Inc. were purchased from Norman Lear by Willie Nelson, who then created Act IV Productions, its sole purpose being management of the Show Biz library. Not long afterwards, Waylon himself became the owner to the rights of his first feature film.

Casting aside previous disapproval of the film, Jennings himself made the film available on VHS through his "Pony Express" store. In 2004, both Waylon's estate and Bear Family Records released DVDs of the movie. The Bear Family release offers chapter selection and adds the 11 songs found on the 1966 RCA Victor soundtrack LP.

== Aspect ratio problems ==
When preparing the film for release on VHS and DVD, an anamorphic projection print was used rather than the original Techniscope negatives. As a result, the home video releases are indeed presented in a 1.78:1 aspect ratio. However, since the film was shot in Techniscope (a method often used by budget filmmakers), the correct exhibition ratio is 2.35:1. The 1.78:1 prints used are vertically compressed, intended to be projected with a special lens to achieve the proper aspect ratio. When viewed on a widescreen TV, the picture settings can be adjusted to the proper ratio.
