= Waylon: An Autobiography =

Book by Waylon Jennings

- Author: Waylon Jennings, Lenny Kaye
- Cover artist: Frank W. Ockenfels III
- Language: English
- Subject: Autobiography
- Publisher: Warner Books
- Publication date: 1996
- Publication place: United States
- Media type: Print (Hardcover, Paperback)
- Pages: 520 pages (hardcover)
- ISBN: 978-0-446-51865-9

Waylon: An Autobiography is an autobiography by American country music singer-songwriter Waylon Jennings with the assistance of writer Lenny Kaye. Published by Warner Books in 1996, the book received favorable reviews.

== Background ==
=== Development ===
Jennings first considered writing an autobiography in 1976 after his publicist, Bill Conrad, sparked the idea up in conversation. Conrad later recalled in an interview that when Jennings brought the idea to his manager, Neil Reshen, Reshen immediately struck it down. Reshen stated that if he were to do one it would be set up by Reshen himself and to be co-authored by Chet Flippo. Flippo, a senior journalist at Rolling Stone, was well liked by Jennings.

The idea Reshen proposed however, was complicated by a recent dispute Jennings' had with Rolling Stone. Jennings had recently axed a front page cover on the magazine by Flippo, due to them not granting Waylon final editorial rights over the article. According to Conrad, that demand itself stemmed from an interview in People that reported he was considering a vasectomy which angered him. Jennings subsequently insisted that future interviews be subject to a final edit and legal agreement, a policy that made him increasingly difficult for journalists to interview.

=== Content ===
The book details Jennings' life starting with his upbringing in rural Littlefield, Texas, including his work as a dirt poor sharecropper in Littlefield cotton fields, followed by his introduction to music. He then goes on to describe his friendship with and mentorship from Buddy Holly as a teenager, and into his role as a pioneer of the outlaw country movement in the 1970s.

Jennings also looks back on his life thus far discussing his struggles with drug addiction including his 1977 arrest. The book talks about his personal relationships through 3 failed marriages, before finally reaching his then 26 year marriage to Jessi Colter.

The book was co-written with the help of Lenny Kaye, and published by Warner Books in 1996.

== Reception ==
The book received mostly positive reviews from critics. Jonathan Yardley of The Washington Post described the book as an unusually strong account of American popular music and would go onto praise Jennings' storytelling throughout.

Upon its 2012 rerelease, Damian Penny of Seattle Post-Intelligencer talked highly of Jennings' honesty as well as his humor in recounting his life, describing the book as an engaging account of his career and experiences.
