= Ladies Love Outlaws (Waylon Jennings album) =

Studio album by Waylon Jennings
- Released: September 1972
- Recorded: 1971–1972
- Studios: RCA Studio A (Nashville, Tennessee)
- Genres: Country; outlaw country
- Length: 29:42
- Label: RCA Victor
- Producers: Ronny Light; Waylon Jennings

Waylon Jennings chronology
Good Hearted Woman (1972)	Ladies Love Outlaws (1972)	Lonesome, On'ry and Mean (1973)

Ladies Love Outlaws is the seventeenth studio album by American country music artist Waylon Jennings, released on RCA Victor in 1972. Together with Jennings' previous album Good Hearted Woman, it marks his transition toward his Outlaw Country image and style. "Ladies Love Outlaws" coined the use of the term "Outlaw" to refer to the country music subgenre, which was developing at the time of its release.

== Background ==
At this time, Jennings was suffering from hepatitis and was hospitalized. Frustrated by RCA Records' control over him, and thinking that he would have no more hit records, Jennings was considering retiring and, after a long time of deficient work, he fired his manager Lucky Moeller. During his recovery, his drummer Richie Albright visited him and persuaded Jennings to try again. Meanwhile, his contract with RCA Records was nearing its end. Albright introduced Jennings to Neil Reshen, a New York lawyer who had experience handling bands and contract problems. Jennings engaged Reshen as his manager, who encouraged the singer to grow his hair and beard long to emphasize his "outlaw" image . Willie Nelson, who Reshen would also go on to manage, recalled later, "These were the days when Waylon was still in the clutches of RCA management that demanded he sing certain songs a certain way. Neil put a stop to that. He backed down the establishment." The brash Reshen renegotiated Jennings' deal with RCA Records, and by the time of the agreement, Jennings received complete artistic freedom over producing, recording and selection of material, and the cover art of his albums. This would set the stage for the "outlaw country" movement that would dominate the industry throughout the 1970s, and Jennings, along with Nelson, Kris Kristofferson, and a handful of other like-minded renegades, would be its figurehead.

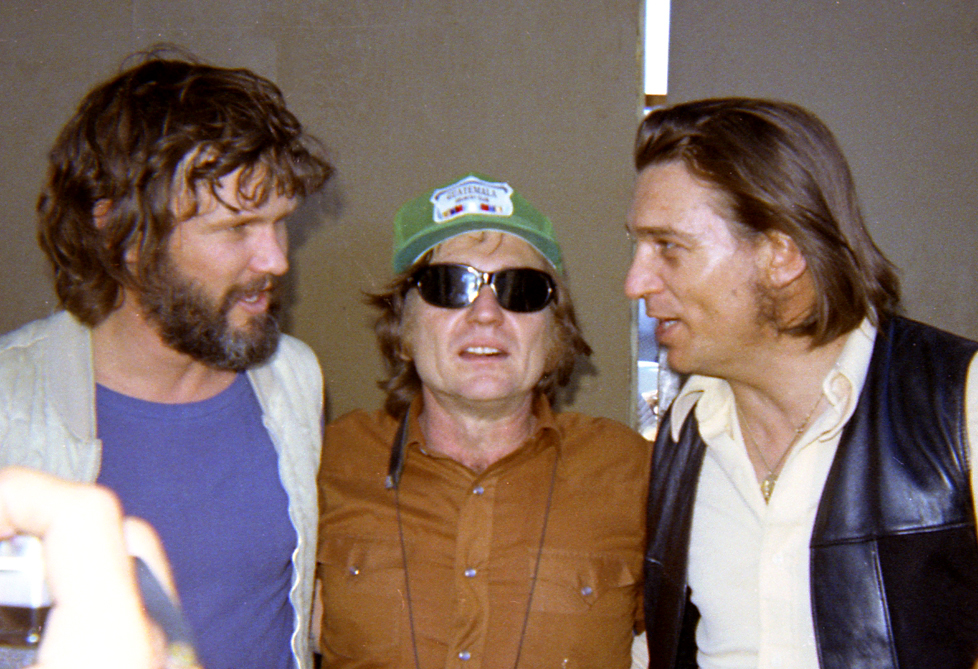
Outlaw country singers Kristofferson, Nelson and Jennings (L-R) at the Dripping Springs Reunion in March 1972

== Recording ==
The title of the album originated from the song "Ladies Love Outlaws", written by singer-songwriter Lee Clayton. The composition mentions Jennings in one of its stanzas, describing his relation with his wife Jessi Colter: "Jessi liked Cadillacs and diamonds on her hands, Waymore had a reputation as a ladies man/Late one night her light of love finally gave a sign, Jessi parked her Cadillac and took her place in line." Clayton proposed that Jennings record the track, and Jennings decided to use it for the title of his next RCA Records release. Jennings' usual producer Chet Atkins was delegating the production of albums to other studio members so he could focus on his career as an artist so he assigned Danny Davis to produce the album. Davis' collaboration with Jennings ended when Jennings grew tired of Davis' conservative restrictions, took a gun into the studio and threatened to "shoot off the fingers" of the producer or any musician who would play a pickup note. Atkins replaced Davis with producer Ronny Light. Recording took place at RCA Victor's Nashville studio through 1971–72, with the exception of "Thanks", which was recorded in 1970. The album's liner notes were written by Los Angeles Times critic Robert Hilburn.

In his autobiography, Jennings said he was dissatisfied with RCA Records' decision to release the album without consulting him and insisted that the recordings of him contained scratch vocals, which he intended to use to help the band obtain a good sound; he had planned on redoing the vocals later. He also said that the label published the unfinished album without asking him about his progress. While he was satisfied with the results of "Frisco Depot" and considered the song complete, he said that Hoyt Axton's "Never Been to Spain" was never planned for a release. Jennings said, "I still cringe when I hear myself singing 'Never Been to Spain'. It sounded like I'd never even been to Cleveland".

Ladies Love Outlaws and Jennings' previous album Good Hearted Woman marked a change in Jennings' appearance. The cover of Ladies Love Outlaws shows Jennings on a scene set in an Old West motif, dressed in black with a revolver strapped to his waist,looking at his five-year-old niece, Ladonna. Previously, Jennings kept his hair short and his face clean-shaven, and he wore suits. After the release of Ladies Love Outlaws, he started to wear faded jeans and cowboy boots.

In 2013, Ladies Love Outlaws was remastered and made available for download by Legacy Recordings.

== Reception ==
Professional ratings
Review scores
Source	Rating
Allmusic	3.5/5 stars
Christgau's Record Guide	C

The album was released in September 1972 and peaked at number eleven on Billboard's Top Country Albums. The duet with his wife Jessi Colter, "Under Your Spell Again", was released in 1971 as a single; it reached number 39 on Billboard's hot country singles. Critic Chet Flippo of Rolling Stone wrote a negative review of the album, calling it "vague and unfinished". Jennings liked the review; upon reading it he called Flippo and said that RCA released the album before time without his consent, and invited Flippo to accompany him on his bus during a tour. Author Dean Tudor called the songs on the album "exciting", and wrote that Jennings "finely calculated the art of creating the 'laid back' country sound, and finely complements the forceful, but subdued, instrumentation with vocals that never strain for dramatic effect". Tudor described the album's style as a "blurred" boundary between country and rock and roll. Thom Jurek of Allmusic gave the album three-and-a-half stars out of five and wrote that Jennings' performances offered him in a "deeply expressive terrain" as a vocalist. Jurek also wrote that Jennings "wrings emotion from songs rather than merely projecting them into a microphone".

== Track listing ==
Side One
No.	Title	Writer(s)	Recording date	Length
1.	"Ladies Love Outlaws"	Lee Clayton	January 11, 1972	2:32
2.	"Never Been to Spain"	Hoyt Axton	May 16, 1972	2:37
3.	"Sure Didn't Take Him Long"	Waylon Jennings	January 11, 1972	2:21
4.	"Crazy Arms"	Ralph Mooney, Chuck Seals	August 31, 1971	2:34
5.	"Revelation"	Bobby Braddock	September 1, 1971	3:14

Side Two
No.	Title	Writer(s)	Recording date	Length
1.	"Delta Dawn"	Larry Collins, Alex Harvey	May 16, 1972	3:20
2.	"Frisco Depot"	Mickey Newbury	March 9, 1972	4:58
3.	"Thanks"	Phil Coulter, Bill Martin	July 14, 1970	2:25
4.	"I Think It's Time She Learned"	Waylon Jennings, Mirriam Eddy (aka Jessi Colter)	May 12, 1971	2:47
5.	"Under Your Spell Again" (with Jessi Colter)	Buck Owens, Dusty Rhodes	March 11, 1971	2:54

== Personnel ==
- Waylon Jennings - Vocals, Guitar
- Ralph Mooney - Steel guitar
- Dave Kirby - Guitar
- Billy Ray Reynolds - Guitar
- Billy Sanford - Guitar
- Jerry Stembridge - Guitar
- John "Bucky" Wilkin - Guitar
- Bobby Dyson - Bass
- Norbert Putnam - Bass
- Henry Strzelecki - Bass
- Kenny Buttrey - Drums
- Buddy Harman - Drums
- Larrie Londin - Drums
- Hargus "Pig" Robbins - Piano
- Jim Pierce - Piano
- Richard Powell - Synthesizer

== Chart positions ==
=== Album ===
Chart (1972)	Peak position
Billboard's Top Country albums	11

=== Singles ===
Song	Chart (1971)	Peak
"Under Your Spell Again" (with Jessi Colter)	Hot Country songs	39
