= Waylon (TV special) =

1980 television special following Waylon Jennings, James Garner, and Jessi Colter

- Release poster
- Written by: Bart LaRue; Bob Booker; Jack Thompson
- Directed by: Tom Trbovich; Ellen Brown; Rita Rogers; Gene Crowe
- Presented by: Wrangler
- Starring: Waylon Jennings; James Garner; Jessi Colter; Richie Albright
- Theme music composer: Waylon Jennings; Richie Albright
- Country of origin: United States
- Original language: English

Production
- Producers: Jack Thompson; Bob Booker; Barbara Booker; Micki D. Thompson
- Cinematography: Bob Keyes; Bill Philbin
- Editor: Bob Schneider
- Running time: 56 minutes
- Production company: Thompson/Booker Productions

Original release
- Network: ABC
- Release: October 23, 1980

Related
- Nashville Rebel (1966); My Heroes Have Always Been Cowboys (1984); Never Say Die: The Final Concert (2000)

Waylon is a 1980 television special produced by Thompson/Booker Productions. The special premiered on ABC on October 23, 1980, and follows Waylon Jennings and his guest James Garner as well as Waylon's wife Jessi Colter as they perform back-to-back concerts at Mr. Lucky's and the Red Rocks Amphitheater from July 31–August 1, 1980.

== Background ==
The program was produced by Jack Thompson and Bob Booker of Booker/Thompson Productions and featured Jennings while performing in several locations.

The first stop on the film was at Mr. Lucky's, a Phoenix country music nightclub that had hosted Jennings and other prominent country performers for much of its lifespan. The venue was established by Bob Sikora in 1966 and had became a popular destination for country music audiences in Arizona. Jennings' appearance at the club was filmed before a sold-out crowd, with then owner J. David Sloan later recalling that approximately 1,200 people attended the recording.

The programm concluded with footage filmed at Red Rocks Amphitheatre near Denver, Colorado during his August 1, 1980 concert at the venue.

The special would air on October 23, 1980.

== Cast ==
- Waylon Jennings — himself
- James Garner — himself
- Jessi Colter — herself
- Richie Albright — himself
