= Leavin' Town =

Studio album by Waylon Jennings
- Released: October 1966
- Recorded: February 1966
- Studio: RCA Victor Studios (Nashville, Tennessee)
- Genre: Country
- Length: 28:54
- Label: RCA Victor
- Producer: Chet Atkins

Waylon Jennings chronology
Folk-Country (1966)	Leavin' Town (1966)	Nashville Rebel (1967)

Leavin' Town is the third studio album by American country music artist Waylon Jennings, released in 1966 via RCA Victor. It peaked at No. 3 on the Billboard country albums chart.

== Background ==
Much like his debut album (also released in 1966), Leavin' Town features a more tempered vocal approach from Jennings and the countrypolitan production that was typical at RCA at the time. In his 2013 book Outlaws: Waylon, Willie, Kris, and the Renegades of Nashville, author Michael Striessguth notes, "One of the early hit singles, 'Anita, You're Dreaming,' co-written by Waylon and [Don] Bowman, found Waylon in a serious and cautious vocal mode that remembered Jim Reeves, only this time with a trace of Marty Robbins, whose famous Latin sound rose up on Waylon's albums more than a few times in the 1960s." In the authorized Jennings video biography Renegade Outlaw Legend, producer Chet Atkins recalled, "I was just trying to make a record that would sell that the disc jockeys would play. I never thought, 'Let's make a pop record' or "Let's make a folk record.' I didn't think too much in that direction." Jennings later recalled, "Chet did the arrangement on "Anita, You're Dreaming" because I was too close to that song."

The LP contains three songs composed by Jennings as well as contributions from Bobby Bare, Mel Tillis, Harlan Howard, and Gordon Lightfoot. The LP's most successful single would be the Lightfoot composition "(That's What You Get) For Lovin' Me," which rose to #9. Stephen Thomas Erlewine of AllMusic writes that Leavin' Town showcases Jennings "developing a distinctive blend of country and folk."

Professional ratings
Review scores
Source	Rating
Allmusic	link

== Track listing ==
No.	Title	Writer(s)	Length
1.	"Leavin' Town"	Bobby Bare	2:09
2.	"Time to Bum Again"	Harlan Howard	2:04
3.	"If You Really Want Me To, I'll Go"	Delbert McClinton	2:03
4.	"Baby, Don't Be Looking in My Mind"	Howard	2:55
5.	"But That's Alright"	Autry Inman	2:07
6.	"Time Will Tell the Story"	Waylon Jennings	2:06
7.	"You're Gonna Wonder About Me"	Mel Tillis	2:28
8.	"(That's What You Get) For Lovin' Me"	Gordon Lightfoot	2:30
9.	"Anita, You're Dreaming"	Don Bowman, Jennings	2:29
10.	"Doesn't Anybody Know My Name"	Rod McKuen	2:59
11.	"Falling for You"	Ralph Mooney	2:39
12.	"I Wonder Just Where I Went Wrong"	Bowman, Jennings	2:25
