= Waymore's Liquor Store =

Liquor store in Littlefield, Texas

- Storefront of Waymore's in June 2025
- Interactive map of Waymore's Liquor Store

Restaurant information
- Established: 1971 (as a filling station); 2005 (as a liquor store)
- Owners: James D. Jennings; Helen Jennings
- Food type: Liquor
- Location: 901 Hall Avenue, Littlefield, Texas, 79339, United States
- Coordinates: 33°55′02″N 102°19′32″W
- Website: www.waymoresliquorstore.com

Waymore's Liquor Store is a liquor store and Waylon Jennings museum located in Littlefield, Texas owned by Waylon's little brother James D. Jennings and his wife Helen Jennings. The store sells liquor, wine, and beer.

== History ==
Side view of Waymore's pictured in August 2010.

James D. Jennings, the youngest sibling of Waylon Jennings, and James' wife, Helen, acquired a filling station at the corner of Hall Avenue and East Waylon Jennings Boulevard in Littlefield in 1971.

James would work as a mechanic at the station for 34 years before reopening the location in its current state. In 2005, the couple converted their property into a drive-through liquor store, retaining space for a museum dedicated to Waylon. The museum today contains photographs, album covers, instruments, records, and other personal memorabilia associated with Waylon Jennings' life and career. Among the displayed items are his first Harmony Patrician guitar, as well as multiple gold and platinum records.

The store's namesake comes from Waylon Jennings' nickname, "Waymore". Visitors have been able to view the collection and hear stories about the singer and his family from James Jennings, who has also shared memories of his brother's life while they grew up in Littlefield.
