= Cowboys and Indians =

Cowboys and Indians may refer to:

- "Cowboys and Indians", various children's games, similar to Cops and robbers
- It may also refer to actual battles fought by American cowboys and various Native-American tribes, such as the Raid on Godfrey Ranch, Skirmish at Fort Elliott, Pinhook Draw fight, and various skirmishes during Pecos War.

== Films ==
- Cowboys and Indians (film), 2007 American short film
- The Cowboy and the Indians, a 1949 American Western film directed by John English
- Cowboys & Indians: The Killing of J.J. Harper, a 2003 television movie about the killing of John Joseph Harper

== Music ==
=== Albums ===
- Cowboys and Indians (album), a 2003 album by The Jeevas
- Cowboys and Indians, a 1965 album by The New Christy Minstrels

=== Songs ===
- "Cowboys & Indians", a song by The Cross from the album Shove It
- "Cowboy and Indian", a song by Susumu Hirasawa from the album The Ghost in Science
- "Cowboys & Indians", a song by Nik Kershaw from the album The Works
- "Cowboys and Indians", several tracks by M from the album New York–London–Paris–Munich

== Printed media ==
- Cowboys & Indians (magazine), an American magazine for adults that focuses on the Western lifestyle
- Cowboys & Indians: The Killing of J.J. Harper, a 1999 book by Gordon Sinclair Jr. about the killing of John Joseph Harper
- Cowboys and East Indians, a 2015 novel

== See also ==
- All Indian Rodeo Cowboys Association, a Native American organization which promotes Indian rodeo
- American Indian Wars
- Cowboy (disambiguation)
- Indian (disambiguation)
- Western (genre)
