= Waylon at JD's =

Studio album by Waylon Jennings
- Released: December 1964
- Recorded: December 4, 1964
- Studios: Arizona Recorders, Phoenix, Arizona
- Length: 27:01
- Label: Sound Limited
- Producers: Waylon Jennings; Jim Musil

Waylon Jennings chronology
Waylon at JD's (1964)	Folk-Country (1966)

Waylon at JD's is the debut studio album by American singer Waylon Jennings. Though listed in several sources as a live recording, it is in fact a studio album, recorded at Arizona Recorders in Phoenix on December 4, 1964.

== Background ==
In 1964, Jennings and his band The Waylors began playing a club called J.D.'s in Tempe, Arizona, owned by J.D. Musil. Jennings' electric repertoire, which included country, rock and roll, and folk music, made him a local star as he gained a loyal fan base throughout Arizona. "It's a thing called payin' your dues," the singer explained in the authorised video biography Renegade Outlaw Legend, "but while you're payin' your dues you're learnin' your craft, you're learnin' your trade. You're learnin' what you're gonna do." In his autobiography Waylon he elaborates, "I developed my whole style of performing in the honky-tonks...I'd get bored, and start changing the tunes, moving the rhythms around, improvising the phrasing, stretching my boundaries. Putting the music out and having it come back....When I learned how to do that, I never forgot it." Intrigued by the local buzz surrounding Jennings in Phoenix at the time, Willie Nelson drove out to JD's to "see what all the fuss was about" and later recalled, "Didn't take more than one song to convince me: this son of a bitch was going places." Early in his run at the club, Jennings hired his long-time drummer Richie Albright.

Released to capitalize on Jennings' popularity and co-produced by Jennings and Musil's son and club manager, James D. "Jim" Musil, Waylon at JD's was sold only at the Phoenix nightclub. When it sold out quickly so a new batch of albums was pressed. Those sold out as well. In 1969, Decca Records (now part of Universal Music) purchased the rights to the album from Musil, and reissued the album in an abridged form as Waylon Jennings on its Vocalion label. The songs from this album have been issued countless times on low-budget, unauthorized CDs. To date, there are only three truly authorized reissues of the "JD's" album: 1995's Clovis to Phoenix (Zu-Zazz/Bear Family), 1999's The Journey: Destiny's Child (Bear Family) and 2002's Phase One: The Early Years 1959-1964 (Hip-O/Universal).

== Track listing ==
1. "Crying" (Roy Orbison, Joe Melson)
2. "Sally Was a Good Old Girl" (Harlan Howard)
3. "Burning Memories" (Mel Tillis, Wayne Walker)
4. "Big Mamou" (Link Davis)
5. "Money (That's What I Want)" (Janie Bradford, Berry Gordy) (Lead vocals: Gerald "Jerry" Gropp)
6. "Don't Think Twice, It's All Right" (Bob Dylan)
7. "Dream Baby" (Cindy Walker)
8. "It's So Easy" (Buddy Holly, Norman Petty)
9. "Lorena" (Charlie Williams) (Lead vocals: Paul Foster)
10. "Love's Gonna Live Here" (Buck Owens)
11. "Abilene" (Les Brown, Bob Gibson, John D. Loudermilk) (With Foster and Gropp)
12. "White Lightning" (J.P. Richardson)

== Personnel ==
- Waylon Jennings – lead vocals, lead guitar
- Jerry Gropp – rhythm guitar, vocals
- Paul Foster – bass guitar, vocals
- Richie Albright – drums

Technical

- Jim Musil – producer, arrangements
- Jack Miller – engineer
