= Good Hearted Woman =

Studio album by Waylon Jennings
- Released: February 1972
- Recorded: 1969–71
- Studios: RCA Victor (Nashville, Tennessee)
- Genre: Country
- Length: 28:54
- Label: RCA Victor
- Producers: Ronny Light; Danny Davis

Waylon Jennings chronology
Cedartown, Georgia (1971)	Good Hearted Woman (1972)	Ladies Love Outlaws (1972)

Singles from Good Hearted Woman
- 1. "Good Hearted Woman" Released: December 14, 1971; 2. "Sweet Dream Woman" Released: June 10, 1972

Good Hearted Woman is the sixteenth studio album by American country music artist Waylon Jennings, released in 1972 by RCA Records.

== Recording and composition ==
Good Hearted Woman was produced by Ronny Light, who was appointed by Chet Atkins to produce Waylon after Danny Davis left to work with his brass ensemble. In his autobiography, Jennings, who had developed a chip on his shoulder regarding producers, admitted to badgering the young producer during the sessions: "Ronny was young, one of the nicest people in the world, and didn't deserve the misery I put him through. I got more freedom with him as a producer, although I was still using musicians who didn't know what I was about."

The album's most famous song is the title track, which has since become a country classic. In 1969, while staying at the Fort Worther Motel in Fort Worth, Texas, Jennings was inspired to start writing the song when he saw advertising on a newspaper promoting Tina Turner as a "good hearted woman loving a two-timing man", a reference to Ike Turner. Jennings went to talk to Willie Nelson, who was in a middle of a poker game, and told Nelson about his idea. While they kept playing, they expanded the lyrics as Nelson's wife Connie Koepke was writing them down.

== Critical reception ==
The album peaked at #7 on the Billboard country albums chart. AllMusic: "In sum, Good Hearted Woman is a pretty sensational outing for Jennings; he's feeling his power here, and as the door opened just one more crack, the listener can hear how it never closed again."

Professional ratings
Review scores
Source	Rating
Allmusic	link

== Track listing ==
No.	Title	Writer(s)	Length
1.	"Good Hearted Woman"	Waylon Jennings, Willie Nelson	3:00
2.	"Same Old Lover Man"	Gordon Lightfoot	2:48
3.	"One of My Bad Habits"	Harlan Howard	2:14
4.	"Willie and Laura Mae Jones"	Tony Joe White	2:57
5.	"It Should Be Easier Now"	Nelson	3:05
6.	"Do No Good Woman"	Jennings	2:11
7.	"Unsatisfied"	Shirl Milete	2:50
8.	"I Knew You'd Be Leavin'"	Billy Ray Reynolds	2:43
9.	"Sweet Dream Woman"	Chip Taylor, Al Gorgoni	2:59
10.	"To Beat the Devil"	Kris Kristofferson	4:04
