= Nashville Rebel =

Soundtrack album by Waylon Jennings
- Released: December 1966
- Recorded: April – July 1966
- Studios: RCA Victor Studios (Nashville, Tennessee)
- Genre: Country
- Length: 29:10
- Label: RCA Victor
- Producers: Chet Atkins; Bob Ferguson

Waylon Jennings chronology
| Leavin' Town (1966) | Nashville Rebel (1966) | Waylon Sings Ol' Harlan (1967) |

Nashville Rebel is the fourth studio album by American country music artist Waylon Jennings, released in December 1966 via RCA Victor. It reached No. 4 on the Billboard Hot Country LP's chart.

== Background ==
After recording two albums for RCA Victor, Jennings was cast in the Jay Sheridan film Nashville Rebel. In the authorized video documentary Renegade Outlaw Legend, Jennings recalled, "I went and auditioned for that and I thought I was terrible. But I was the one they wanted...I don't know how in the world I did it 'cause I was out of it [on pills] most of the time." The album includes a cover of The Beatles' "Norwegian Wood" from Rubber Soul (1965), although it was not featured in the movie. Jennings later recalled, "Chet [Atkins, Jennings' record producer] came up with the left-field idea of doing a version of The Beatles' 'Norwegian Wood.' It was this kind of unpredictability that endeared Chet to me. He loved those Beatles tunes, and I did too." It also features several songs written by Harlan Howard, and Jennings would record a full album of Howard's songs on his next LP. The Howard-written "Green River" was released as a single and peaked at #11 on the charts. RCA Victor issued the album in "Reprocessed Stereo" sound (an electronic technique invented by RCA to simulate a "stereophonic" effect on monophonic recordings) although most of the songs on side one (except "I'm A Long Way From Home") are in true stereo. "Norwegian Wood" wasn't available in true stereo until 1999, but the five movie instrumental tracks (tracks 8–12) have never been appeared in true stereo anywhere. Tom Jurek of AllMusic writes: "While the title of the album may be prophetic in terms of the radical changes in Waylon Jennings' career around 1971, the music found here is anything but. While Jennings brought seven of the twelve songs to these sessions, and starred in the film, the soundtrack feels and sounds dated and overwrought - mostly from a production point of view."

Shooter Jennings performed, in portrayal of his father, "I'm a Long Way from Home" for the soundtrack to the Johnny Cash biopic Walk the Line in 2005.

Professional ratings
Review scores
| Source | Rating |
|---|---|
| Allmusic | link |

== Track listing ==
| No. | Title | Writer(s) | Length |
|---|---|---|---|
| 1. | "Silver Ribbons" | Jim Robinson, Johnny Wilson, Vern Meroney | 2:26 |
| 2. | "Nashville Bum" | Waylon Jennings, Glenn Corbin, Frankie Miller | 1:56 |
| 3. | "Green River" | Harlan Howard | 2:32 |
| 4. | "Nashville Rebel" | Howard | 1:54 |
| 5. | "I'm a Long Way from Home" | Hank Cochran | 3:31 |
| 6. | "Tennessee" | Howard | 2:14 |
| 7. | "Norwegian Wood" | John Lennon, Paul McCartney | 2:04 |
| 8. | "Hoodlum" | Jay Sheridan | 2:57 |
| 9. | "Spanish Penthouse" | Sheridan | 2:44 |
| 10. | "Lang's Theme" | Sheridan | 1:31 |
| 11. | "Rush Street Blues" | Sheridan | 2:20 |
| 12. | "Lang's Mansion" | Sheridan | 2:55 |

== Personnel ==
- Waylon Jennings - guitar, vocals
- Chip Young, Fred Carter Jr., Jerry Reed, Shirl Milete, Velma Smith - guitar
- Charlie McCoy, Jerry Gropp - guitar, harmonica
- Junior Huskey, Norbert Putnam - bass guitar
- Weldon Myrick - steel guitar
- Hargus Robbins - piano
- Jerry Carrigan, Richie Albright - drums
- Chet Atkins - arrangements
