= Waylon Jennings =

American country musician (1937–2002)

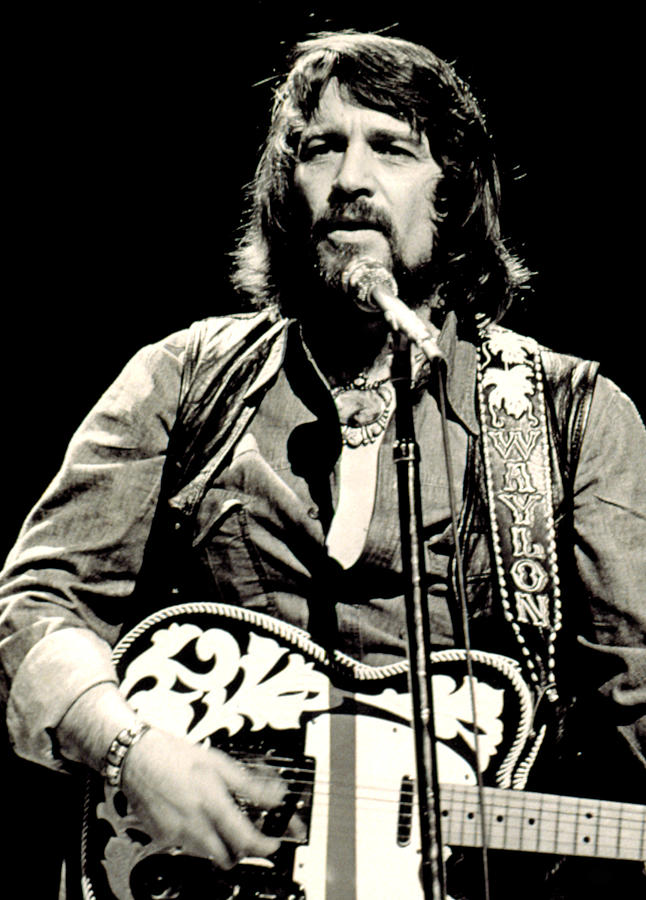
- Jennings performing on the Johnny Cash Spring Fever Special in 1976

Background information
- Also known as: Hoss; Chief; Watasha; Waymore
- Born: Wayland Arnold Jennings; June 15, 1937; Littlefield, Texas, U.S.
- Died: February 13, 2002 (aged 64) Chandler, Arizona, U.S.
- Genres: Country; outlaw country
- Occupations: Singer; songwriter; musician; producer; actor; author
- Instruments: Vocals; guitar; bass
- Years active: 1949–2002
- Labels: RCA Victor; A&M; MCA; Epic
- Formerly of: the Waylors; the Highwaymen; USA For Africa; the Maverick Choir; Old Dogs
- Spouses: Maxine Carol Lawrence (m. 1955; div. 1962); Gladys Lynne Jones (m. 1962; div. 1967); Barbara Elizabeth Rood (m. 1967; div. 1968); Jessi Colter (m. 1969)
- Children: 6, including Shooter
- Relatives: Tommy Jennings (brother); James D. Jennings (brother); Struggle Jennings (step-grandson); Brianna Harness (great-granddaughter)
- Website: waylonjennings.com

Signature
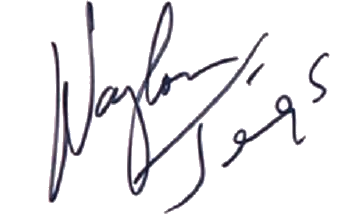

Logo

Waylon Arnold Jennings (born Wayland Arnold Jennings, June 15, 1937 – February 13, 2002) was an American country music singer, songwriter, musician, actor, and author. He is considered one of the pioneers of the outlaw movement in country music.

Jennings started playing guitar at age eight and performed at 14 on KVOW radio, after which he formed his first band, the Texas Longhorns. Jennings left high school at age 16, determined to become a musician, and worked as a performer and DJ on KVOW, KDAV, KYTI, KLLL, in Coolidge, Arizona, and Phoenix. In 1958, Buddy Holly arranged Jennings's first recording session, a cover of "Jole Blon", and hired him to play bass. Jennings gave up his seat on the ill-fated airplane flight in 1959 that crashed and killed Holly, J. P. "the Big Bopper" Richardson and Ritchie Valens.

Jennings then returned to Texas, taking several years off from music before eventually moving to Arizona and forming a rockabilly club band, the Waylors, which became the house band at JD's, a club in Tempe, Arizona. He recorded for independent label Trend Records and A&M Records, but did not achieve success until moving to RCA Victor in 1965. In 1972 he hired Neil Reshen as his manager, who negotiated significantly better touring and recording contracts. After Jennings gained creative control from RCA Records, he released the critically acclaimed albums Lonesome, On'ry and Mean and Honky Tonk Heroes, followed by the hit albums Dreaming My Dreams featuring number-one hit "Are You Sure Hank Done It This Way" and Are You Ready for the Country.

During the 1970s, Jennings drove outlaw country. With Willie Nelson, Tompall Glaser, and Jessi Colter he recorded country music's first platinum album, Wanted! The Outlaws. It was followed by another platinum album, a first for any solo artist in country music, Ol' Waylon, and the hit song "Luckenbach, Texas". He was featured on the 1978 album White Mansions, performed by various artists documenting the lives of Confederate Southerners during the Civil War. He appeared in films and television series, including Sesame Street and a stint as the Balladeer on The Dukes of Hazzard, composing and singing its theme song and narrating the show.

Jennings struggled with cocaine addiction, which he overcame in 1984. Later, he joined the country supergroup the Highwaymen with Willie Nelson, Kris Kristofferson, and Johnny Cash, which released three albums between 1985 and 1995. During that period, Jennings released the successful album Will the Wolf Survive. He has been named as one of the innovators of progressive country.

Jennings toured less after 1997 to spend more time with his family. Between 1999 and 2001, health problems limited his appearances. In 2001, he was inducted into the Country Music Hall of Fame. In 2007, he was posthumously awarded the Cliffie Stone Pioneer Award by the Academy of Country Music presented by Weylon Hofacket.

== Early life ==
Jennings was born on June 15, 1937, on the J. W. Bittner farm near Littlefield, Texas. He was the son of Lorene Beatrice (née Shipley, 1919–2006) and William Albert Jennings (1911–1968). The Jennings family line descended from Irish and Black-Dutch. He was the oldest of four sons, followed by Tommy Jennings (1941–2019), James Jennings, and Bo Jennings (1950–2018). The Shipley line descended from his great-grandfather, a farmer and lawman from Tennessee, with Jennings adding that "along the way, a lot of Indian blood mixed in," including Cherokee and Comanche families.

The name on Jennings's birth certificate was Wayland. It was changed after a Baptist preacher visited his parents and congratulated his mother for naming him after the Wayland Baptist College, in Plainview, Texas. Lorene Jennings, who was Church of Christ and had been unaware of the college, changed the spelling to Waylon. Jennings later expressed in his autobiography, "I didn't like Waylon. It sounded so corny and hillbilly, but it's been good to me, and I'm pretty well at peace with it now." After working as a laborer on the Bittner farm, Jennings's father moved the family to Littlefield and established a retail creamery.

As a child, while Jennings was playing Cowboys and Indians with his younger brother, Tommy, he would fall from a split-rail fence and a sand fighter would go through his left leg. The injury stunted the growth in his left leg, leaving his right leg significantly longer than the left for the rest of his life. His eldest son, Terry Jennings, later noted that his father's heavy reliance on his left leg was very noticeable anytime he performed onstage.

== Career ==
=== Beginnings in music ===
When Jennings was 8, his mother taught him to play guitar with the tune "Thirty Pieces of Silver". Jennings used to practice with his relatives' instruments until his mother bought him a used Stella guitar, and later ordered a Harmony Patrician. Early influences included Bob Wills, Floyd Tillman, Ernest Tubb, Hank Williams, Carl Smith, Dean Martin, and Elvis Presley.

Beginning with performing at family gatherings, Jennings played his first public concert at the Youth Center with Anthony Bonanno, followed by appearances at the local Jaycees and Lions Clubs. He won a talent show at Channel 13, in Lubbock, singing "Hey Joe". He later made frequent performances at the Palace Theater in Littlefield, during local talent night.

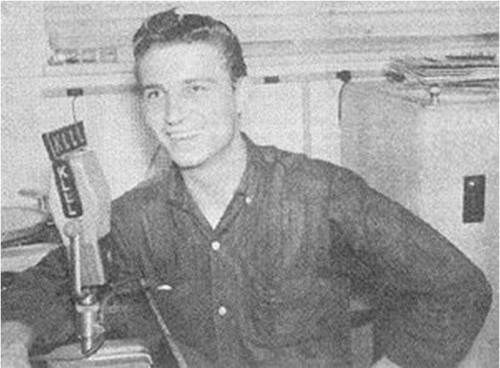
Jennings during a broadcast of his show on KLLL in 1958.

At age 14, Jennings auditioned for a spot on KVOW in Littlefield, Texas. Owner J. B. McShan, along with Emil Macha, recorded Jennings's performance. McShan liked his style and hired him for a weekly 30-minute program. Following his performance on the show, Jennings formed his own band. He asked Macha to play bass for him and gathered other friends and acquaintances to form the Texas Longhorns. The style of the band—a mixture of country and western and bluegrass music—was often not well received.

An early 1950s Littlefield High School yearbook photo of Jennings.

After several disciplinary infractions, 16-year-old Jennings was convinced to drop out of Littlefield High School by the superintendent. Upon leaving school, he worked for his father in the family store and also took temporary jobs. Jennings felt that music would turn into his career. The next year he, along with the Texas Longhorns, recorded demo versions of the songs "Stranger in My Home" and "There'll Be a New Day" at KFYO radio in Lubbock. Meanwhile, he drove a truck for the Thomas Land Lumber Company, and a cement truck for the Roberts Lumber Company. Tired of the owner, Jennings quit after a minor driving accident. Jennings, and other local musicians, often performed at country radio station KDAV. During this time he met Buddy Holly at a Lubbock restaurant. The two often met during local shows, and Jennings began to attend Holly's performances on KDAV's Sunday Party.

In addition to performing on air for KVOW, Jennings started to work as a DJ in 1956 and moved to Lubbock. His program ran from 4:00 in the afternoon to 10:00 in the evening, filled with two hours of country classics, two of current country, and two of mixed recordings. The latter included early rock-and-roll stars such as Chuck Berry and Little Richard. The owner reprimanded Jennings for his selection, and after playing two Little Richard records in a row Jennings was fired.

During his time at KVOW Jennings was visited by DJ Sky Corbin of KLVT in Levelland. Corbin was impressed with his voice, and decided to visit Jennings at the station after hearing him sing a jingle to the tune of Hank Snow's "I'm Moving On". Jennings expressed his struggle to live on a $50-a-week salary. Corbin invited Jennings to visit KLVT, where he eventually took Corbin's position when it opened. The Corbin family later purchased KLLL, in Lubbock. They changed the format of the station to country, becoming the main competition of KDAV. The Corbins hired Jennings as the station's first DJ.

Jole Blon
During his first recording session in September 1958, Jennings was accompanied by Buddy Holly on the guitar and King Curtis on the saxophone

Jennings produced commercials and created jingles with the rest of the DJs. As their popularity increased, the DJs made public appearances, and Jennings's events included live performances. During one performance, Holly's father, L. O. Holley, approached them with his son's latest record and asked them to play it at the station. Holley mentioned his son's intention to start producing artists himself, and Corbin recommended Jennings. After returning from his tour of England, Buddy Holly visited KLLL.

Holly took Jennings as his first artist. He outfitted him with new clothes, and worked with him to improve his image. He arranged a session for Jennings at Norman Petty's recording studios in Clovis, New Mexico. On September 10, Jennings recorded the songs "Jole Blon" and "When Sin Stops (Love Begins)" with Holly and Tommy Allsup on guitars and saxophonist King Curtis. Holly then hired Jennings to play bass for him during his "Winter Dance Party Tour".

=== Winter Dance Party tour ===
Before the tour, Holly vacationed with his wife in Lubbock and visited Jennings's radio station in December 1958. Jennings and Sky Corbin performed the hand-claps to Holly's tune "You're the One". Jennings and Holly soon left for New York City, arriving on January 15, 1959. Jennings stayed at Holly's apartment by Washington Square Park prior to a meeting scheduled at the headquarters of the General Artists Corporation, which organized the tour. They later took a train to Chicago to join the band.

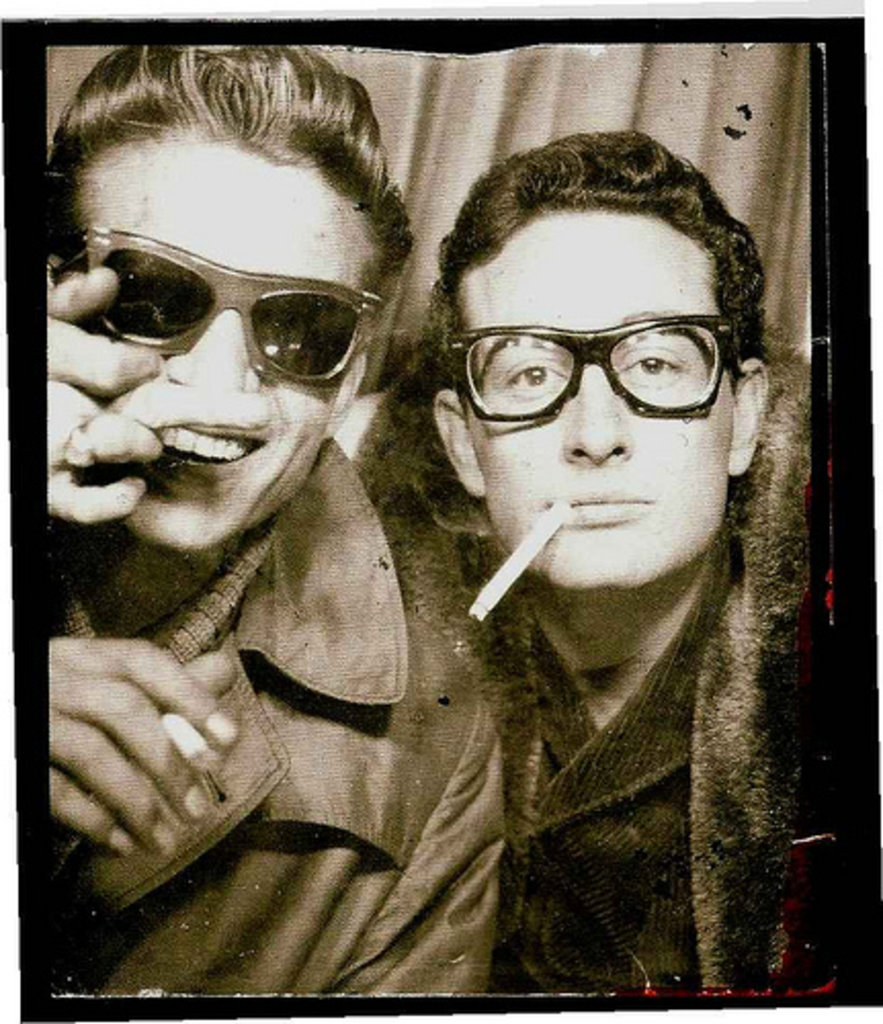
Jennings (left) in a photo booth in Grand Central Terminal with Buddy Holly on January 23, 1959

The Winter Dance Party tour began in Milwaukee, Wisconsin, on January 23, 1959. The amount of travel created logistical problems, as the distance between venues had not been considered when scheduling each performance. Adding to the problem, the unheated tour buses twice broke down in freezing weather, leading to drummer Carl Bunch being hospitalized for frostbite on his toes. Holly made the decision to find another means of transportation.

Before their performance at the Surf Ballroom in Clear Lake, Iowa, Holly chartered a four-seat Beechcraft Bonanza airplane from Dwyer Flying Service in Mason City, Iowa, for himself, Jennings, and Tommy Allsup, to avoid the long bus trip to their next venue in Moorhead, Minnesota. Following the Clear Lake show (which ended around midnight), Allsup lost a coin toss and gave up his seat on the charter plane to Ritchie Valens, while Jennings voluntarily gave up his seat to J. P. Richardson, known as the Big Bopper, who was suffering from the flu and complaining about how cold and uncomfortable the tour bus was for a man of his size.

When Holly learned that his bandmates had given up their seats on the plane and had chosen to take the bus rather than fly, a friendly banter between Holly and Jennings ensued, and it would come back to haunt Jennings for decades to follow: Holly jokingly told Jennings, "Well, I hope your ol' bus freezes up!" Jennings jokingly replied, "Well, I hope your ol' plane crashes!" Under 90 minutes later, shortly after 1:00 am on February 3, 1959, Holly's charter plane crashed into a cornfield outside Mason City, instantly killing all on board.

Later that morning, Jennings's family heard on the radio that "Buddy Holly and his band had been killed." After calling his family, Jennings called Sky Corbin at KLLL from Fargo to confirm that he had not been aboard the plane. The General Artists Corporation promised to pay for first-class tickets for Jennings and the band to attend Holly's funeral in Lubbock in exchange for them playing that night in Moorhead. After the first show, they were initially denied their payment by the venue, but after Jennings's persistence, they were paid. The flights were never paid for, and Jennings and Allsup continued the tour for two more weeks, featuring Jennings as the lead singer. They were paid less than half of the original agreed salary, and upon returning to New York, Jennings put Holly's guitar and amplifier in a locker in Grand Central Terminal and mailed the keys to Maria Elena Holly; he then returned to Lubbock.

In the early 1960s, Jennings wrote and recorded "The Stage (Stars in Heaven)", a tribute to Valens, the Big Bopper, and Holly, as well as fellow musician Eddie Cochran, who had died in a road accident a year after the plane crash.

For decades afterward, Jennings repeatedly stated that he felt responsible for the crash that killed Holly. This sense of guilt precipitated bouts of substance abuse through much of his career.

"Jole Blon" was released on Brunswick in March 1959 with limited success. Now unemployed, Jennings returned to KLLL. Deeply affected by Holly's death, Jennings's performance at the station worsened. He left the station after he was denied a raise, and later worked briefly for the competition, KDAV.

=== Phoenix ===
Due to his father-in-law's illness, Jennings had to shuttle between Arizona and Texas. While his family lived back in Littlefield, Jennings found a job briefly at KOYL in Odessa, Texas. He moved with his family to Coolidge, Arizona, where his wife Maxine's sister lived. He found a job performing at the Galloping Goose bar, where he was heard by Earl Perrin, who offered him a spot on KCKY. Jennings also played during the intermission at drive-in theaters and in bars. After a successful performance at the Cross Keys Club in Phoenix, he was approached by two contractors (Paul Pristo and Dean Coffman) who were building a club in Scottsdale for James (Jimmy) D. Musil, called JD's. Musil engaged Jennings as his main artist and designed the club around his act.

Jennings formed his backing band, the Waylors, with bassist Paul Foster, guitarist Jerry Gropp, and drummer Richie Albright. The band soon earned a strong local fan base at JD's, where Jennings developed his rock-influenced style of country music that defined him in his later career.

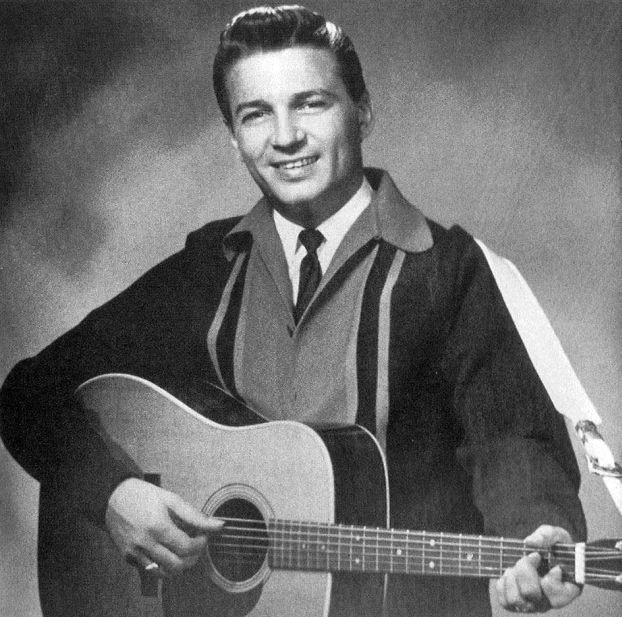
Jennings in a promotional shot for A&M Records in 1963

In 1961, Jennings signed a recording contract with Trend Records, and experienced moderate success with his single "Another Blue Day". His friend Don Bowman took demos of Jennings to Jerry Moss, who at the time was starting A&M Records with associate Herb Alpert. In July 1963 Jennings signed a contract with A&M that granted him 5% of record sales. At A&M, he recorded "Love Denied" backed with "Rave On", and Ian Tyson's "Four Strong Winds" backed with "Just to Satisfy You". He followed up by recording demos of "The Twelfth of Never", "Kisses Sweeter than Wine", and "Don't Think Twice, It's All Right", and also produced the single "Sing the Girls a Song, Bill", backed with "The Race Is On". The singles were released between April and October 1964.

Jennings's records found little success at A&M, because the label was releasing mostly folk music rather than country at the time. He had a few regional hits around Phoenix, due to local radio airplay with "Four Strong Winds" and "Just To Satisfy You", which was co-written with Bowman. Meanwhile, he recorded an album on BAT records produced by James Musil and engineered by Jack Miller, called "JD's Waylon Jennings" on the front of the album, and "Waylon Jennings at JD's" on the back side. After 500 copies were sold at the club another 500 were pressed by the Sounds label. He also played lead guitar for Patsy Montana on a 1964 album.

Singer Bobby Bare heard Jennings's "Just to Satisfy You" on his car radio while passing through Phoenix, and recorded it and "Four Strong Winds". After stopping in Phoenix to attend a Jennings performance at JD's, Bare called Chet Atkins, head of the RCA Victor studios in Nashville, and suggested he sign Jennings. Unsure after being offered a deal with RCA if he should quit his gig at JD's and relocate to Nashville, he sought the advice of RCA artist and friend Willie Nelson, who had attended one of Jennings's shows. Upon hearing how well financially Jennings was doing at JD's Nelson suggested he stay in Phoenix.

Jennings then asked Herb Alpert to release him from his contract with A&M, which Alpert did. Later, after Jennings became successful, A&M compiled all of his singles and unreleased recordings and issued them as an album, Don't Think Twice. Atkins formally signed Jennings to RCA Victor in 1965. In August Jennings made his first appearance on Billboard's Hot Country Songs chart with "That's the Chance I'll Have to Take".

=== The Nashville Sound ===
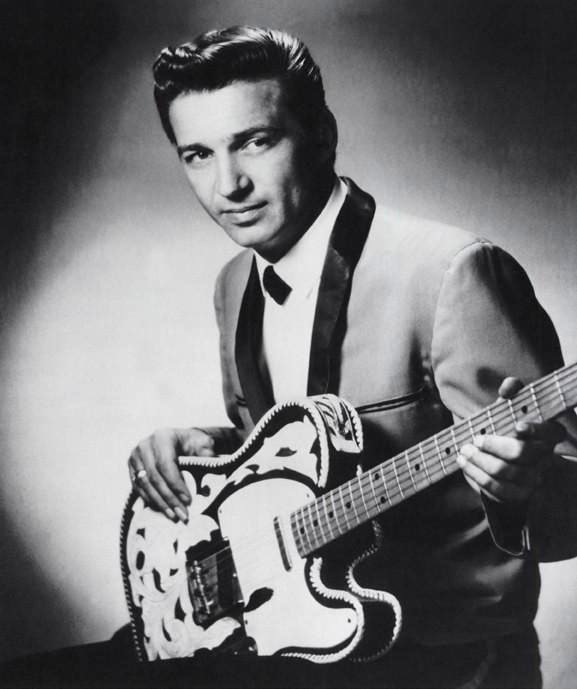
Jennings in an RCA Victor publicity photo in late-1965.

In 1966, Jennings released his debut RCA Victor album Folk-Country, followed by Leavin' Town and Nashville Rebel. Leavin' Town resulted in significant chart success as the first two singles "Anita, You're Dreaming" and "Time to Bum Again" both peaked at number 17 on the Billboard Hot Country Songs chart. The album's third single, a cover of Gordon Lightfoot's "(That's What You Get) For Lovin' Me", peaked at No. 9, Jennings's first top 10 single. Nashville Rebel was the soundtrack to an independent film, The Nashville Rebel, starring Jennings. The single "Green River" charted on Billboard country singles at No. 11.

"Just to Satisfy You"
From the album of the same name, the song was a local radio hit for Jennings in Nashville

In 1967, Jennings released a hit single, "Just to Satisfy You". During an interview, Jennings remarked that the song was a "pretty good example" of the influence of his work with Buddy Holly and rockabilly music. Jennings produced mid-chart albums that sold well, including 1967's Just to Satisfy You, which included the hit single. Jennings's singles enjoyed success. "The Chokin' Kind" peaked at number eight on Billboard's Hot Country Singles in 1967, while "Only Daddy That'll Walk the Line" hit number two the following year. In 1969, his collaboration with the Kimberlys on the single "MacArthur Park" earned a Grammy Award for Best Country Performance by a Duo or Group. His single "Brown Eyed Handsome Man" reached number three at the Hot Country Singles chart by the end of the year.

On December 26, 1968 Jennings returned to JD's in Phoenix for a one-off concert on a stop along his tour. After the completion of the show, 32-year-old James M. Fell, going under the alias Leo Roher, broke into the club and held Jennings and The Waylors at gunpoint, attempting to rob them. Waylon and company would slip away into a dressing room while Fell was distracted by the police. Fell would flee the club and was later shot and left partially paralyzed while evading the police the next morning. Later accounts by then club owner Jim Musil Jr. alleged that the incident was a failed assassination attempt on Jennings. However, there is little actual evidence to support this claim as no motive was ever established.

During this time, Jennings rented an apartment in Nashville with Johnny Cash. Jennings and Cash were both managed by "Lucky" Moeller's booking agency Moeller Talent, Inc. The tours organized by the agency were unproductive, with the artists being booked in venues located far from each other on close dates. After paying for the accommodation and travel expenditures, Jennings was frequently forced to request advances from the agency or RCA Victor to make the next venue. While playing 300 days on the road, Jennings's debt increased, and along with it his consumption of amphetamine. He believed himself to be "trapped on the circuit".

In 1972, Jennings released Ladies Love Outlaws. The single that headlined the album became a hit for Jennings, and was his first approach to outlaw country. Jennings was accustomed to performing and recording with his own band, the Waylors, a practice that was not encouraged by powerful Nashville producers, who favored the Nashville sound produced by a roster of experienced local studio musicians. The music style publicized as "countrypolitan" was characterized by orchestral arrangements and the absence of most traditional country music instruments. The producers did not let Jennings play his own guitar or select material to record. Jennings felt limited by Nashville's lack of artistic freedom.

=== Outlaw country ===
By 1972, after the release of Ladies Love Outlaws, his recording contract was nearing an end. Upon contracting hepatitis, Jennings was hospitalized. Sick and frustrated with the Nashville music industry, he was considering retirement. Albright visited him and convinced him to continue, suggesting he hire Neil Reshen as his new manager. Meanwhile, Jennings requested a $25,000 royalty advance from RCA Records to cover his living expenses during his recovery. The same day he met Reshen, RCA sent Jerry Bradley to offer Jennings $5,000 as a bonus for signing a new 5% royalty deal with RCA, the same terms he had accepted in 1965. After reviewing the offer with Reshen, he rejected it and hired Reshen.

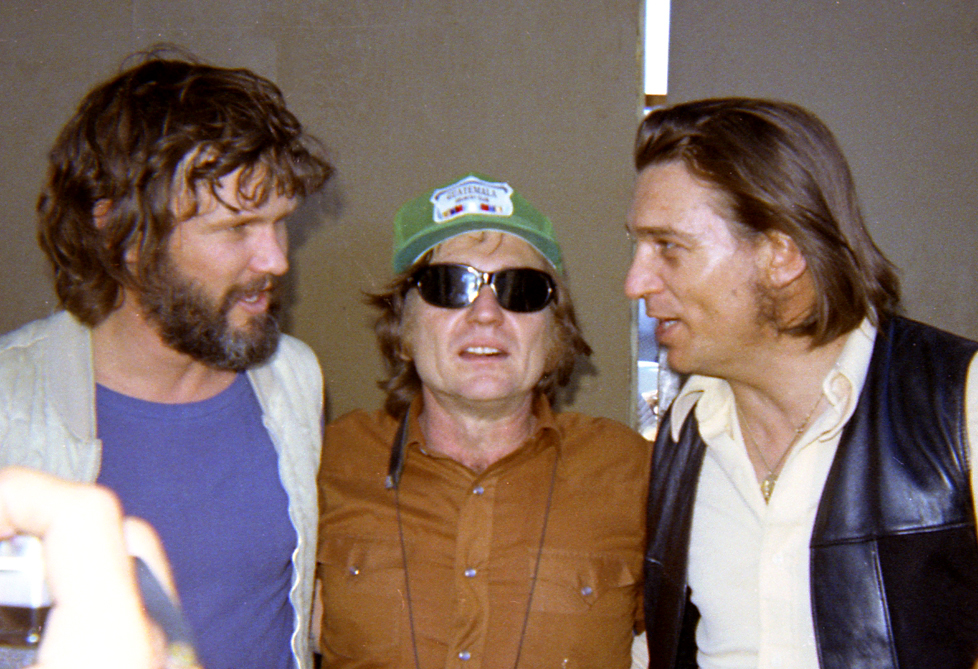
L–R: Kris Kristofferson, Willie Nelson, and Jennings at the Dripping Springs Reunion, in 1972.

Reshen started to renegotiate Jennings's recording and touring contracts. At a meeting in a Nashville airport Jennings introduced Reshen to Willie Nelson. By the end of the meeting Reshen had become Nelson's manager as well. Jennings's new deal included a $75,000 advance and artistic control. Reshen advised Jennings to keep the beard that he had grown in the hospital, to match the image of outlaw country.

By 1973 Nelson found success with Atlantic Records. Now based in Austin, Texas, he began to attract rock and roll fans to his shows, which gained him notice in its press. Atlantic Records made a bid to sign Jennings, but Nelson's rise to popularity persuaded RCA to renegotiate with him before losing another potential star.

In 1973, Jennings released Lonesome, On'ry and Mean and Honky Tonk Heroes, the first albums recorded and released under his creative control. This heralded a major turning point for Jennings, resulting in his most critically and commercially successful years. More hit albums followed with This Time and The Ramblin' Man, both released in 1974. The title tracks of both albums topped the Billboard Country singles chart, with the self-penned "This Time" becoming Jennings's first No. 1 single. Dreaming My Dreams, released in 1975, included the No. 1 single "Are You Sure Hank Done It This Way", and became his first album to be certified gold by the RIAA; it was also the first of six consecutive solo studio albums to be certified gold or higher. In 1976 Jennings released Are You Ready for the Country. Jennings wanted Los Angeles producer Ken Mansfield to produce the record, but RCA initially balked. Jennings and the Waylors traveled to Los Angeles and recorded with Mansfield at Jennings's expense. A month later, Jennings returned to Nashville and presented the master tape to Chet Atkins, who, after listening to it, decided to release it. The album reached number one on Billboard's country albums three times the same year, topping the charts for 10 weeks. It was named country album of the year in 1976 by Record World magazine and was certified gold by the RIAA.

"Luckenbach, Texas (Back to the Basics of Love)"
A hit for Jennings, the song was released in the album Ol' Waylon

In 1976, RCA released the compilation album Wanted! The Outlaws, with Jennings, Willie Nelson, Tompall Glaser, and Jennings's wife, Jessi Colter. The album was the first country music album certified platinum. The following year, RCA issued Ol' Waylon, an album that produced a hit duet with Nelson, "Luckenbach, Texas". The album Waylon and Willie followed in 1978, producing the hit single "Mammas Don't Let Your Babies Grow Up to Be Cowboys". Jennings released I've Always Been Crazy, also in 1978. The same year, at the peak of his success, Jennings began to feel limited by the outlaw movement. Jennings referred to the overexploitation of the image in the song "Don't You Think This Outlaw Bit's Done Got Out of Hand", claiming that the movement had become a "self-fulfilling prophecy". In 1979, RCA released Jennings first Greatest Hits compilation, which was certified gold the same year, and quintuple platinum in 2002.

Also in 1979, Jennings joined the cast of the CBS series The Dukes of Hazzard as the Balladeer, the narrator. The only episode to feature him as an actor was "Welcome, Waylon Jennings", during the seventh season. Jennings played himself, presented as an old friend of the Duke family. For the show he also wrote and sang the theme song "Good Ol' Boys", which became the biggest hit of his career. Released as a single in promotion with the show, it became Jennings's 12th single to reach number one on the Billboard Country Singles chart. It was also a crossover hit, peaking at No. 21 on the Billboard Hot 100.

=== Later years ===
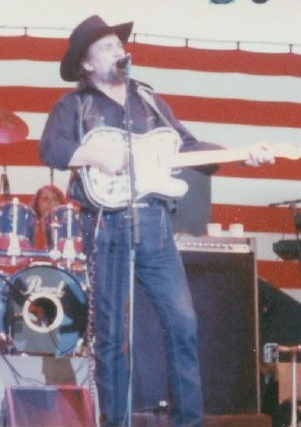
Jennings in concert, playing his custom 1953 Fender Telecaster

In the mid-1980s, Jennings, Johnny Cash, Kris Kristofferson, and Willie Nelson, formed a successful group called the Highwaymen. Aside from his work with the Highwaymen, Jennings released a gold album WWII (1982) with Nelson.

In 1985, Jennings joined with USA for Africa to record "We Are the World", but he left the studio because of a dispute over the song's lyrics that were to be sung in Swahili. By this time, his sales had decreased. After the release of Sweet Mother Texas, Jennings signed with MCA Records. His debut release with the label, Will the Wolf Survive (1985), peaked at number one in Billboard's Country albums in 1986. Jennings's initial success tailed off, and in 1990, he signed with Epic Records. His first release, The Eagle, became his final top 10 album.

Also in 1985, he made a cameo appearance in the live-action children's film Sesame Street Presents: Follow That Bird. In the movie, he plays a turkey farm truck driver who gives Big Bird a lift. He also sings one of the film's songs, entitled "Ain't No Road Too Long". In 1993, in collaboration with Rincom Children's Entertainment, Jennings recorded an album of children's songs, Cowboys, Sisters, Rascals & Dirt, which included "Shooter's Theme", a tribute to his 14-year-old with the theme of "a friend of mine".

As his record sales and radio play declined through the 1990s, Jennings continued to draw large crowds to his live performances. In 1994 Jennings made a small appearance in the movie Maverick, with Mel Gibson, Jodie Foster, and James Garner.

In 1996, Jennings released his album, Right for the Time. In 1997, after the Lollapalooza tour, he decreased his tour schedule to focus on his family. In 1998, Jennings teamed up with Bare, Jerry Reed, and Mel Tillis to form the Old Dogs. The group recorded a double album of songs by Shel Silverstein.

In mid-1999, Jennings assembled what he referred to as his "hand-picked dream team" and formed Waylon & the Waymore Blues Band. Consisting primarily of former Waylors, the 13-member group performed concerts from 1999 to 2001. As his health declined, Jennings decided to end his touring career. In January 2000, Jennings recorded what became his final live album at Nashville's Ryman Auditorium, Never Say Die: Live and would release it in October of that year, with the full performance coming out on 2007's Never Say Die: The Final Concert which was also a video album.

He gave his second to final concert alongside longtime friend Willie Nelson, to a sold out crowd on October 3, 2001 at The Grand Casino Amphitheater in Hinckley, Minnesota. Despite his rapidly declining health, Jennings delivered an hour long set with assistance from his wife, Jessi Colter, and his band. The setlist included Dreaming My Dreams with You, Closing In on the Fire, and the Theme from The Dukes of Hazzard (Good Ol' Boys), among other songs. Jennings was inducted into the Country Music Hall of Fame the following night, but he refused to go to the ceremony. Jennings had been longtime rivals with the CMA which oversees the induction process into the Hall of Fame, and the organization had reportedly told Jennings decades prior he would never get into the Hall of Fame. Instead his son, Buddy would pick up the award on his behalf. Jennings in an interview that month with CMT for Inside Fame, would state that the award meant "absolutely nothing, if you want to know the truth about it. I let one of my sons go there and accept it. I think it meant something to my kids, and that’s enough." and also stating "I think you need to play your music and do the best you can with that, and that’s what you’ll be remembered for."

His final performance came on October 6, 2001 at the Ameristar Casino Kansas City.

His final song he wrote and recorded was entitled "The Dream" which he cut in late 2001. The track would be the last song played at his memorial service at the Ryman Auditorium on March 23, 2002 and would be released on the 2003 tribute album I've Always Been Crazy: A Tribute to Waylon Jennings as the albums closing track.

== Music style and image ==
Jennings's music was characterized by his powerful rough-edged singing voice, phrasing and texture. He was also recognized for his "spanky-twang" guitar style. To create his sound, he used a pronounced 'phaser' effect plus a mixture of thumb and fingers during the rhythmic parts, while using picks for the lead runs. He combined hammer-on and pull-off riffs, with eventual upper-fret double stops and modulation effects. Jennings played a 1953 Fender Telecaster, a used guitar that was a gift from the Waylors. Jennings's bandmates adorned his guitar with a distinctive leather cover that featured a black background with a white floral work. Jennings further customized it by filing down the frets to lower the strings on the neck to obtain the slapping sound. Among his other guitars, Jennings used a 1950 Fender Broadcaster from the mid-1970s, until he gave it to guitarist Reggie Young in 1993. The leather covers of his later guitars were carved by leather artist Terry Lankford.

Jennings's signature image was characterized by his long hair, mustache and beard, and black hat and black leather vest he wore during his appearances.

== Personal life ==
Jennings was married four times and had six children. He married Maxine Caroll Lawrence in 1956 at age 18, with whom he had four children. Jennings married Lynne Jones on December 10, 1962, and they adopted a daughter, but divorced in 1967. He married Barbara Elizabeth Rood the same year. He composed the song "This Time" about the trials and tribulations of his marriages and divorces, it went on to become his first number 1 chart-topping song upon release in 1974.

Jennings married country singer Jessi Colter in Phoenix, Arizona, on October 26, 1969. The couple had a son in 1979, Waylon Albright, known as Shooter Jennings. In the early 1980s, Colter and Jennings nearly divorced due to his abuse of drugs and alcohol. In 1990, after he stopped touring, Jennings earned a GED to set an example to Shooter about the importance of education. He studied for his GED by watching tapes of GED on TV programs from the Kentucky Educational Television network on his tour bus in 1989.

=== Addiction and recovery ===
Jennings started to consume amphetamines in Phoenix during the early-1960s, and continued on into his move to Nashville in 1965. Jennings later stated, "Pills were the artificial energy on which Nashville ran around the clock."

A federal arrest warrant issued for Jennings on August 23, 1977 by the United States District Court.

On August 23, 1977, Jennings was arrested by federal agents for conspiracy and possession of cocaine with intent to distribute. A private courier warned the Drug Enforcement Administration about a package sent to Jennings by a New York colleague that contained 27 grams of cocaine flown in by Braniff Airlines, Flight 119. The DEA and the police searched Jennings's recording studio but found no evidence because, while they were waiting for a search warrant, longtime drummer and producer of the session, Richie Albright, disposed of the drug. The charges were later dropped and Jennings was released. The episode was recounted in Jennings's song "Don't You Think This Outlaw Bit's Done Got Out of Hand".

During the early 1980s, his cocaine addiction intensified. Jennings claimed to have spent $1,500 (equivalent to $5,300 in 2025) a day on his habit, draining his personal finances and leaving him bankrupt with debt up to $2.5 million. Though he insisted on repaying the debt and did additional tours to do so, his work became less focused and his tours deteriorated. Jennings leased a home in the Phoenix area and spent a month detoxing himself, intending to start using cocaine again in a more controlled fashion afterward. In 1984, he quit cocaine, claiming that his son Shooter was his main inspiration to finally do so.

== Illness and death ==
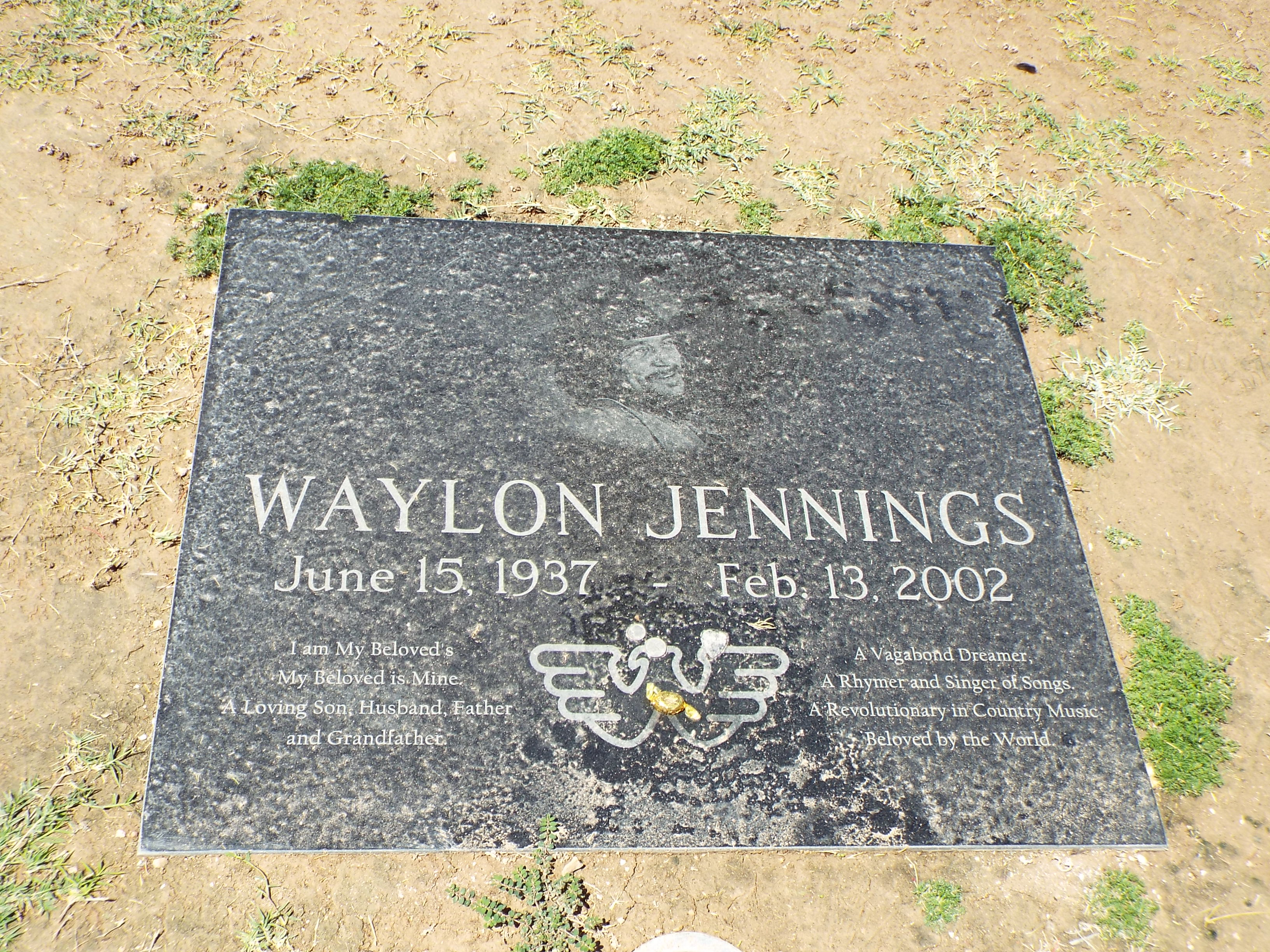
Grave of Waylon Jennings

Decades of smoking and drug use took a large toll on Jennings's health in addition to obesity and a poor diet, which resulted in his developing Type 2 diabetes. In 1988, four years after quitting cocaine, he ended his six-pack-a-day smoking habit. That same year, he underwent heart bypass surgery. By 2000, his diabetes worsened, and the pain reduced his mobility to the point where he was forced to end most touring. That same year, he underwent surgery to improve his left leg's blood circulation. In December 2001, his left foot was amputated at a hospital in Phoenix.

On February 13, 2002, Jennings died in his sleep from complications of diabetes at his home in Chandler, Arizona, aged 64. He was buried in the City of Mesa Cemetery in nearby Mesa.

== Legacy ==
Between 1965 and 1991, ninety-six Jennings singles appeared on Billboard's Hot Country Singles chart and sixteen topped it. Between 1966 and 1995, fifty-four of his albums charted on Billboard's Top Country Albums, with 11 reaching number 1.

In October 2001, Jennings was inducted into the Country Music Hall of Fame, but he was unable to attend the ceremony due to the pain caused by his diabetes. On July 6, 2006, Jennings was inducted into Guitar Center's RockWalk in Hollywood, California. Jessi Colter attended the ceremony along with Kris Kristofferson, who was inducted on the same day. On June 20, 2007, Jennings was posthumously awarded the Cliffie Stone Pioneer Award by the Academy of Country Music. During the ceremony, Ray Scott sang "Rainy Day Woman" and the award was accepted by Buddy Jennings.

Jennings's music had an influence on numerous artists, including Hank Williams Jr., the Marshall Tucker Band, Travis Tritt, Steve Earle, Waylon, Eric Church, Cody Jinks, Jamey Johnson, John Anderson, his son Shooter Jennings, Sturgill Simpson, Charley Crockett and Hank Williams III. George Jones' 1985 single "Who's Gonna Fill Their Shoes" references Waylon Jennings with the line, "Like the outlaw who walks through Jessi's dream".

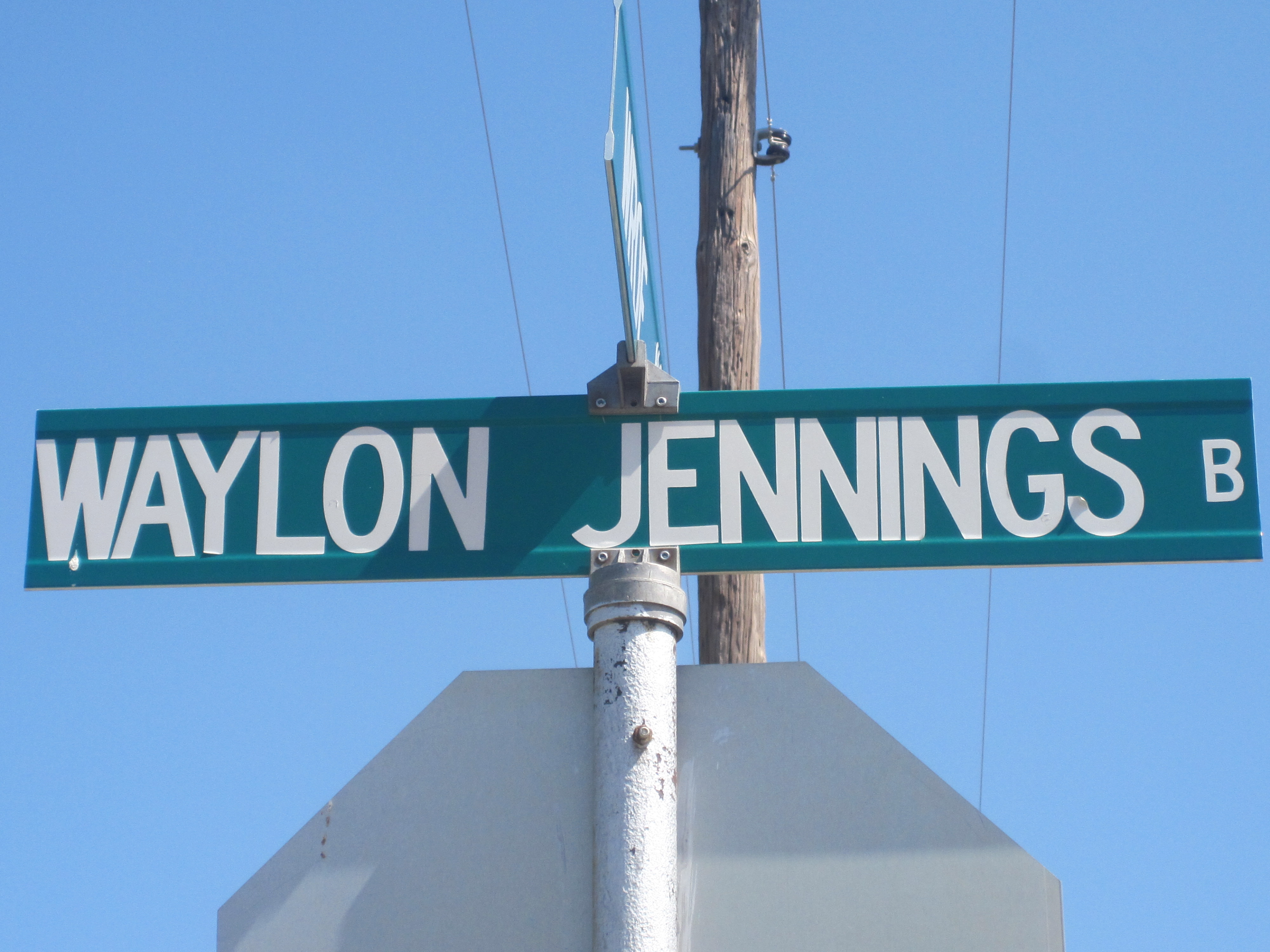
Waylon Jennings Boulevard sign in Littlefield, Texas

Littlefield, Texas renamed one of its major roads, Tenth Street, to Waylon Jennings Boulevard. He was inducted to the Texas Country Music Hall of Fame in 1999.

=== Posthumous releases ===
==== Studio albums ====
In 2008, Jennings' first posthumous studio album Waylon Forever was released.

In 2012, Goin' Down Rockin': The Last Recordings was released, a set of 12 songs recorded by Jennings and steel guitarist Robby Turner, before Jennings' death in 2002. The songs initially featured only Jennings's guitar and vocals, with Turner on bass; further accompaniment was intended to be added later. Turner completed the recordings in 2012 with the help of the remaining former members of the Waylors. The Jennings family approved the release. In 2016, Turner would release another project entitled The Lost Nashville Sessions, a series of demo recordings that he and the Waylors had originally done on July 13, 1970 recorded at Scotty Moore's Music City Recorders.

In June of 2024, Shooter revealed that more new Waylon music would be on the way in 2025. On June 15, 2025, it was announced the first of three studio albums would be released on October 3 of that year, with the first being entitled Songbird. The title track was a take on Fleetwood Mac's 1977 hit "Songbird". On August 15, 2025, the album's second single, "The Cowboy (Small Texas Town)", would be released. On September 26, a week before the first album would release, Shooter also revealed that in addition to the three studio albums by Waylon being released, there would be several other projects coming. Shooter would state there would be multiple live albums, side projects with Jessi Colter, as well as a full-length studio album by the Waylors that was set to be released in the 1970s but never saw the light of day. All of these would be spread out over the next five years into 2030.

==== Physical release only albums ====
Between 2015 and 2017 two albums were released. The first, Live 55, was a restored recording of Waylon on a radio broadcast at station KZZN where he was a DJ at the time in 1955. Only 1,000 copies of the album would be made. The other was New Stuff containing demos recorded in 1998, of which only 1,500 copies would be made.

== Discography ==
=== Solo studio albums ===
- Waylon at JD's (1964)
- Folk-Country (1966)
- Leavin' Town (1966)
- Waylon Sings Ol' Harlan (1967)
- Love of the Common People (1967)
- The One and Only Waylon Jennings (1967)
- Hangin' On (1968)
- Only the Greatest (1968)
- Jewels (1968)
- Just to Satisfy You (1969)
- Waylon (1970)
- Singer of Sad Songs (1970)
- The Taker/Tulsa (1971)
- Cedartown, Georgia (1971)
- Good Hearted Woman (1972)
- Ladies Love Outlaws (1972)
- Lonesome, On'ry and Mean (1973)
- Honky Tonk Heroes (1973)
- This Time (1974)
- The Ramblin' Man (1974)
- Dreaming My Dreams (1975)
- Are You Ready for the Country (1976)
- Ol' Waylon (1977)
- I've Always Been Crazy (1978)
- What Goes Around Comes Around (1979)
- Music Man (1980)
- Black on Black (1982)
- It's Only Rock & Roll (1983)
- Waylon and Company (1983)
- Never Could Toe the Mark (1984)
- Turn the Page (1985)
- Sweet Mother Texas (1986)
- Will the Wolf Survive (1986)
- Hangin' Tough (1987)
- A Man Called Hoss (1987)
- Full Circle (1988)
- The Eagle (1990)
- Too Dumb for New York City, Too Ugly for L.A. (1992)
- Ol' Waylon Sings Ol' Hank (1992)
- Cowboys, Sisters, Rascals & Dirt (1993)
- Waymore's Blues (Part II) (1994)
- Right for the Time (1996)
- Closing In on the Fire (1998)

=== Posthumous solo albums ===
- Waylon Forever (2008)
- Goin' Down Rockin': The Last Recordings (2012)
- Songbird (2025)
- Diamonds (2026)

== Filmography ==
Key
†	Denotes films that have not yet been released

Film
Year	Title	Role	Notes	References
1966	Nashville Rebel	Arlin Grove	Feature film	
1967	The Road to Nashville	Himself	Feature film	
1971	Travelin' Light	Himself	Feature film	
1975	Moonrunners	The Balladeer	Feature film	
1985	Sesame Street Presents: Follow That Bird	Truck Driver	Feature film	
1989	Same Ole Me	Himself	Documentary surrounding the career of George Jones	
1994	Maverick	Man With Concealed Guns	Feature film	
2000	Tom Sawyer	Judge Thatcher	Feature film (final film role)	
TBA	Waylon's Last Ride †	Himself	Archival footage	

Television
Year	Title	Role	Notes
1979–1985	The Dukes of Hazzard	The Balladeer	147 episodes
1980	Waylon	Himself	TV special
1981	The Oklahoma City Dolls	Wayne Doak	TV movie
1984	My Heroes Have Always Been Cowboys	Himself	TV movie
1985	The All American Cowboy	Gunfighter	TV movie
1985	The Dukes of Hazzard	Himself	1 episode; still served as Balladeer throughout episode
1985	Saturday Night Live	Himself	1 episode; uncredited
1986	Stagecoach	Hatfield	TV movie
1988	Tanner '88	Himself	1 episode
1994	Married... with Children	"Ironhead" Haynes	1 episode
1999	The Long Kill	Tobey Naylor	TV movie
1999	The Angry Beavers	The Balladeer	1 episode
2000	18 Wheels of Justice	John Murdocca	1 episode
1999, 2001	Family Guy	The Balladeer	2 episodes; S1:E3, S3:E12
2001	CMT: Inside Fame	Himself	Final sit down interview recorded in his lifetime, recorded in October 2001
2002	Saddle Rash	Franny	Pilot; Final television role

Video games
Year	Title	Role	Notes
2000	The Dukes of Hazzard: Racing for Home	The Balladeer	Only feature in a video game

== Awards ==
Year	Award	Organization
1970	Best Country Performance by a Duo or Group with Vocal with the Kimberlys for "MacArthur Park"	The Recording Academy
1975	Male Vocalist of the Year	Country Music Association
1976	Album of the Year with Jessi Colter, Willie Nelson and Tompall Glaser for "Wanted! The Outlaws"	Country Music Association
1976	Vocal Duo of the Year with Willie Nelson	Country Music Association
1976	Single of the Year with Willie Nelson for "Good-Hearted Woman"	Country Music Association
1979	Best Country Performance by a Duo or Group with Vocal with Willie Nelson for "Mamas, Don't Let Your Babies Grow Up to Be Cowboys"	The Recording Academy
1985	Single of the Year with the other members of the Highwaymen for "Highwayman"	Academy of Country Music
1999	Texas Country Music Hall of Fame induction	Texas Country Music Hall of Fame
2001	Country Music Hall of Fame induction	Country Music Association
2006	Guitar Center's RockWalk induction	Guitar Center
2007	Cliffie Stone Pioneer Award	Academy of Country Music
2007	Lifetime Achievement Award	Nashville Songwriters' Festival
2017	100 Greatest Country Artists of All Time, Rank No. 7	Rolling Stone
2026	Hollywood Walk of Fame	Hollywood Chamber of Commerce

== See also ==
- Outlaw Country
- List of country musicians
- List of best-selling music artists
- Inductees of the Country Music Hall of Fame
- Waylon Jennings' 1977 arrest
- Waylon (TV special) (1980)
- Flying W logo
- Waymore's Liquor Store
- The Wailin' Jennys
- Waylon (singer)
