= Ronny Light =

- Also known as: Ronny Light
- Born: Ronald Lynn Light
- Genres: Country
- Occupation: Producer
- Instrument: Guitar

Ronald Lynn Light (also known as Ronny Light) is an American musician, songwriter, recording engineer, and producer.

Light produced Waylon Jennings's 1972 classic album Good Hearted Woman, including the hit single of the same name which peaked at number three on the Billboard Hot Country Singles chart. As a producer, Light has worked with numerous notable recording artists, including Skeeter Davis, Lenny Breau, Kenny Price, Dallas Frazier, Jane Morgan, Bobby Bare, Liz Anderson, Fess Parker, Red Lane, Hank Snow, Rex Humbard, The Nashville String Band, George Hamilton IV, Connie Smith, Charley Pride, Cherryholmes, Willie Nelson, and Rhonda Vincent.

Light also produced the soundtrack for the 1985 film Malibu Express.
