= Villain Era =

Studio album by India Ramey
- Released: May 8, 2026
- Studios: Stagg Street Studios (Los Angeles); Forty Below Studios (Los Angeles)
- Genre: Country
- Length: 32:20
- Label: Copaco/Blue Élan Records
- Producer: Eric Corne

India Ramey chronology
Baptized by the Blaze (2024)	Villain Era (2026)

Singles from Vilain Era
- 1. "Six Feet Under" Released: October 7, 2025

Villain Era is the sixth studio album by American country music singer-songwriter India Ramey. Produced by Eric Corne and recorded at Stagg Street Studios and Forty Below Studios, both located in the Encino section of Los Angeles, it was released on May 8, 2026, through the Copaco sublabel of Blue Élan Records. Seen as a confident and skillful response to increased misogyny in society, the album was widely praised for writing and performance.

== Background ==
On Ramey's previous 2024 album release, Baptized by the Blaze, the singer-songwriter described resilience in the face of pain due to addiction withdrawal from prescription medication used to treat PTSD triggered by childhood memories of domestic violence. The album was met with encouraging reviews, and Ramey was recognized for attacking pain with humor as a voice for domestic violence survivors.

Ramey emphasized in interviews that she was most interested in inspiring others who were struggling with mental health, addiction, and domestic violence survival problems. For Villain Era, she decided to enlist Los Angeles-based producer Eric Corne to craft an album that sounded like "Johnny Cash and Loretta Lynn rising from the grave to score a Quentin Tarantino film." Corne brought in session players including Eugene Edwards, Ted Russell Kamp, and Chris Masterson and Eleanor Whitmore of The Mastersons, to help with Ramey's directive.

== Reception ==
Villain Era received broad acclaim from reviewers upon its May 2026 release, referred to as an "essential, career album", "one of the year’s most compelling Americana releases", and "an album you just can’t turn away from". Critics described an album that was a tour de force, praising Ramey for crafting a seamless combination of storytelling, humor, anger, and determination that sought and found a truer soul of country music than others could reach. Writing in Glide Magazine, reviewer John Moore saw a mastery of navigating tension between opposing emotions: "The album effortlessly vacillates between moments of despair and humor, making it that much more compelling. Villain Era ultimately thrives on its balance of grit and wit, blending outlaw country and honky tonk tradition with sharp, modern defiance into a record that feels both timeless and pointedly current."

Reviewers remarked on Ramey's "unapologetic" feminism. Journalist Rachel Cholst saw Ramey answering an urgent need with her music, writing "Given the way that cis and trans women alike face renewed threats to bodily autonomy, an album like Villain Era weaponizes the nostalgia of classic country into a powerful statement: women have been used and abused in all kinds of ways – and the circle should be broken." Joining other reviewers, Americana UK's Pete Hill quoted Ramey directly to explain the album's title track: "'Welcome to My Villain Era' is me saying I’m not going to suffer fools anymore. I’m not compromising anymore. If my boundaries offend you, I’ll happily play the villain in that story."

== Track listing ==
All songs by India Ramey.

1. "We Ride At Dawn" - 3:20
2. "Welcome To My Villain Era" - 2:33
3. "Scattered And Smothered" - 2:38
4. "Six Feet Under" - 4:26
5. "Cryin' In My Lingerie" - 3:10
6. "Nobody's Coming" - 4:12
7. "Dead To Me" - 2:31
8. "Cult Money" - 3:12
9. "Red Red Roses" - 3:27
10. "Ghost Town" - 2:51

== Personnel ==
Credits adapted from the album's liner notes.

=== Musicians ===
- India Ramey – lead vocal
- Haley Spence Brown – vocals (2–5, 8, 9)
- Eric Corne – vocals (10)
- Chris Masterson – acoustic guitar, electric guitar (4, 5, 7–10)
- Eugene Edwards – electric guitar (1–3, 6)
- Ted Russell Kamp – bass guitar
- Kevin Brown – drums, percussion
- Bob "Boo" Bernstein - pedal steel guitar (1, 3, 5, 6, 8–10)
- Eleanor Whitmore – fiddle (2, 4)
- Jordan Katz - trumpet (6)

=== Production ===
- Eric Corne – producer, engineering, mixing
- Mark Chalecki – mastering
- Amber-Eye of Doll – cover photography
- Adrienne Isom – photography
- Charles Watlington – design
