= Blue Élan Records =

American record label

- Founded: 2014
- Founder: Kirk Pasich, Connor Pasich
- Distributor: The Orchard (company)
- Genre: Indie rock, rock, Americana (music), Indie pop
- Country of origin: United States
- Location: Los Angeles, California
- Official website: www.blueelan.com

Blue Élan Records is an independent record label based in Los Angeles, California. It was founded by entertainment and insurance lawyer Kirk Pasich, and his son, musician Connor Pasich, in 2014. Stylistically, the label's releases cover Alternative and Indie Rock, Americana, Folk, Blues, Hip Hop, and others. Their artist roster also ranges in age and industry history.

== History ==
Kirk founded the label with his son, Connor, to release Cindy Alexander's sixth album, Curve. After contacting artist Cindy Alexander, whom Kirk had met during the production of StarTomorrow, about her recent cancer treatment, she invited him to visit her studio where she was recording her next album. Shortly after their meeting, the label was formed, and Curve released via Blue Élan Records in 2014.

Over the next four years, Blue Élan added Rita Coolidge, Janiva Magness, Jesse Dayton, Rod Melancon, and others to the roster, including Gerry Beckley and Rusty Young. The label gained further attention in 2017 when Janiva Magness earned a Best Contemporary Blues Album Grammy nomination for her Blue Élan release, Love Wins Again. KT Tunstall joined Blue Élan Records and announced her album Nut on June 1, 2022. The album, her seventh studio release, was subsequently released on September 9, 2022.

The label has partnered with the Alliance for Children's Rights on multiple occasions, a legal fund to help children in poverty access free services to legal aid.

== Artists ==
- Amy Wilcox
- Bob Gentry
- Boxing Gandhis
- Bryan Stephens
- Car Astor
- Chelsea Williams
- Cherie Currie & Brie Darling
- Cindy Alexander
- Colin Devlin
- Cory Branan
- Gina Sicilia
- India Ramey
- Janiva Magness
- Jon Anderson
- Jesse Dayton
- Lisa Lambe
- Mint Trip
- Mustangs of the West
- Natalie Gelman
- Ozomatli
- Red Wanting Blue
- Rod Gator
- Rita Coolidge
- Roan Yellowthorn
- Rusty Young
- The Rembrandts
- Scout Durwood
- Soul Asylum
- Ted Russell Kamp
- The Vegabonds
- The Devlins
