= India Ramey =

American singer-songwriter

- Born: Rome, Georgia
- Origin: Birmingham, Alabama
- Genres: Country; Americana
- Occupation: Singer-songwriter
- Instruments: Vocals; Guitar
- Years active: 2010–present
- Spouse: Shaun Ramey
- Website: www.indiaramey.com

India Ramey is an American singer-songwriter and alt-country musician. After a layoff from her job as an attorney in Alabama, in 2010 she shifted to pursuing a music career and issued her debut album Junkyard Angel. With a performing style that combines dark humor and assertive honky-tonk, Ramey has released multiple singles and full-length albums. Her latest album, Villain Era, was released in May 2026 via Copaco Records/Blue Élan Records.

== Early life ==
Born and raised in Rome, Georgia, in interviews Ramey has described her childhood as distressing, living as a witness to domestic violence by her father against her mother. Among her musical memories, she says her father played albums by Waylon Jennings and the 1976 Willie Nelson compilation set Wanted! The Outlaws "on repeat." Ramey tells of practicing the Jessi Colter parts of the Nelson album, saying she would "get my mom’s curling iron and sing (Colter's) songs while standing on our living room ottoman."

Ramey spent time during her childhood learning musicianship from her grandfather, bluegrass guitarist, banjo player, and singer Rufus Clayton Turner. She described Turner as "a big inspiration" coming from the Sand Mountain music scene, although Turner failed to understand why she wouldn't learn about the area's shape note traditions.

== Musical career ==
Ramey attended the Alabama School of Fine Arts, a magnet school in Birmingham, Alabama. She studied ballet intensively at the public boarding academy, following the lead of her older sister. Choosing to find a career outside of the arts for practical reasons, she then graduated from now-closed Birmingham–Southern College with a bachelor's degree. With her situation as a survivor of domestic violence and hoping to give her family reasons to be proud, as a young adult Ramey decided to pursue a career in law. During her time in law school at the University of Alabama, Ramey met her husband, fellow student Shaun Ramey, through overhearing his conversation about The Tragically Hip, a roots rock band from Ontario that India Ramey knew about from mix tapes sent to her by her Canadian brother-in-law.

Upon graduation from law school, Ramey was hired as a deputy district attorney for Montgomery County, Alabama. She pursued a law career for ten years, eventually moving to private practice in part because of the PTSD caused by the severity of cases she was handling as a prosecutor. Returning to Birmingham, Ramey joined a cover band called Scattered and Smothered, which she described as "a bunch of lawyers and accountants" who played together on weekends.

After being laid off by her firm following the Great Recession of 2008, Ramey decided to pursue music full time. She moved to Nashville with Shaun Ramey in 2010. Working with Montgomery-based producer William Barnes, a fellow performer with Scattered and Smothered, Ramey used savings from her law career to avoid the "cheap and easy route" making production decisions on her first album, Junkyard Angel, released in 2010. She released what has been called her national debut, Snake Handler, containing the single "Devil's Blood," in 2017.

Written by Ramey following the death of Tragically Hip leader Gord Downie in October 2017, "Hole in the World" featured on her following 2020 album release, Shallow Graves. Describing the album as her "post-apocalyptic western," Ramey released three singles from it — "Montgomery Behind Me," "King of the Ashes," and "Up To No Good."

The severity of childhood memories and the domestic violence cases she handled had led Ramey to coping with panic disorder by using prescription Klonopin. She realized she had become addicted to the medicine over a twelve-year period when she tried to lower usage during the COVID-19 pandemic. Ramey suffered severe pain of withdrawal and entered rehab the day following the release of Shallow Graves. She began trauma therapy to replace the drug. Ramey's 2024 album Baptized by the Blaze chronicles her emergence from therapy as emotionally stronger and no longer vulnerable to "narcissists", who she saw as hampering her career by taking advantage of her tendency to want to please others, or by viewing her as a lawyer who was an amateur musician.

Ramey followed up the cathartic Baptized by the Blaze with Villain Era, released on May 8, 2026 via Copaco Records/Blue Élan Records. Reviewers recognized the album as a strong rebuttal to male dominance in society, seeing Ramey as reveling in the role of "villain" for refusing to accept a submissive fate. Writing in No Depression, Rachel Cholst declared, "The 'f' word might not be a popular one to use these days, but Villain Era is some downright feminist outlaw country."

While touring through summer 2026, Ramey released a cover of the 1946 country hit "Drivin' Nails in My Coffin" and a live version of her song "Down for the Count" from Baptized By the Blaze.

== Influences ==
Along with the outlaw country music of Jessi Colter which her father played, Ramey has noted rock musician Pat Benatar as an early influence, telling Shazam.com "I used to sing Jessi Colter songs into a curling iron and rock out to Pat Benatar when I was a little girl." She has cited Kitty Wells, Patsy Cline, Loretta Lynn, Bonnie Raitt, and Patty Loveless as important forces in her musical development. In the Shazam.com interview, Ramey described Fox Confessor Brings the Flood, the 2006 album by Neko Case, as "perfect from start to finish," and has also mentioned Jason Isbell's Southeastern as a favorite.

== Personal life ==
Ramey and her attorney husband Shaun Ramey became a couple a few years after they met in law school, and they reside in Nashville.

== Discography ==
Studio albums

- Junkyard Angel (2010)
- Blood Crescent Moon (2013)
- Snake Handler (2017)
- Shallow Graves (2020)
- Baptized by the Blaze (2024)
- Villain Era (2026)

Singles

- "Devil's Blood" (2017)
- "King of the Ashes" (2020)
- "Montgomery Behind Me" (2020)
- "Up to No Good" (2020)
- "Cocktail for Christmas" (2021)
- "Six Feet Under" (2025)
- "Down for the Count" (Live from the Y'all Star Revue) (2026)
- "Drivin' Nails in My Coffin" (2026)
