= Cindy Alexander =

American singer-songwriter

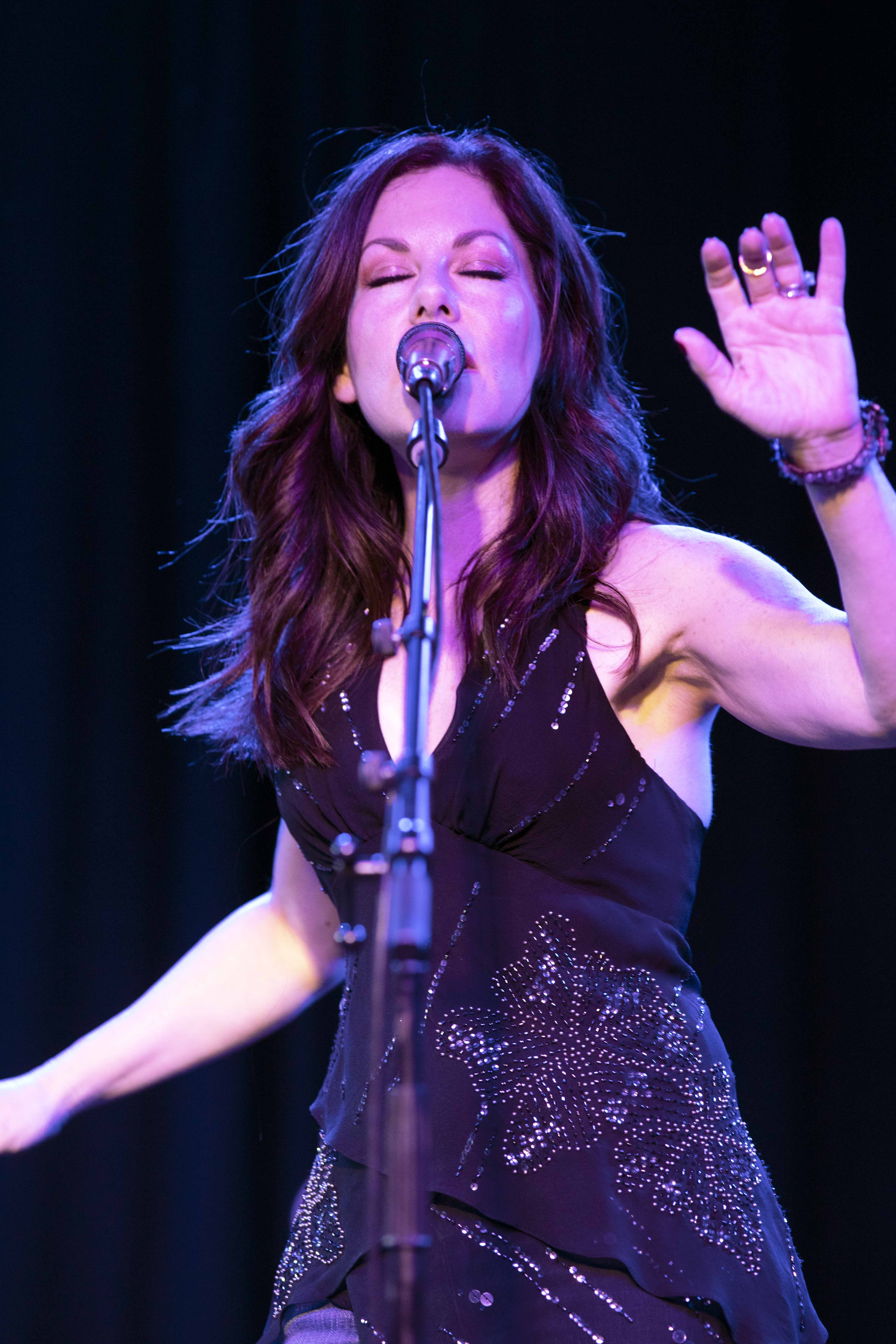
- Alexander at The Coach House 2019

Background information
- Born: Cynthia Ann Plotkin; Los Angeles, California, U.S.
- Genre: folk-rock
- Occupation: Singer-songwriter
- Instruments: Guitars, keyboards
- Years active: 1998–present
- Labels: JamCat Records, Blue Élan Records, KZZ Music
- Website: CindyAlexander.com

Cynthia Ann Plotkin, known professionally as Cindy Alexander, is an American indie singer-songwriter, and multi-instrumentalist. She currently resides in Big Sur, California.

Alexander has toured the United States, Japan, Europe, and Islands as far as Barbados and Guantanamo Bay. She has toured alongside many notable acts throughout her career.

Her music has been featured in films such as Here on Earth, Smokers, Sugar & Spice, Dorm Daze II, The Giving Tree as well as television shows Party of Five, Chasing Farrah, and So You Think You Can Dance.

== Early life ==
She was born in Los Angeles, California, United States. Her mother, Nancy (née Kaufman), was an elementary school teacher, and her father, Gary Plotkin, was an attorney.

Alexander's grandmother, Molly Plotkin, was a music teacher who encouraged her singing from an early age. Later, she was discovered and mentored by the leader of a children's choir, Cantor Nathan Lam. Later, Alexander received further training at the USC School of Drama. But before long, Shakespeare's sentiment that "all the world's a stage" had lured her away from the theater — she realized the best part she could play was herself.

== Musical beginnings: JamCat Records ==
In 1998, Alexander was named Songwriter of the Year and nominated for Female Vocalist of the Year by the Los Angeles Music Awards, while her debut album See Red was nominated for Independent Pop Album of the Year. This record was a compilation of her demos published in CD format so she had something to sell on her first tour supporting The Bacon Brothers. This was the start of JamCat Records, her independent label.

In 2003, her second album SMASH was nominated for Adult Contemporary Album of the Year by the same outfit. SMASH featured cowrites with Grammy Award winners Gary Harrison and Dennis Matkosky. She was named CNET's Net Music Countdown Net Unknown of the Year (joining past recipients such as Michelle Branch) and was named Female Artist of the Year by JP Folks, also winning Pop Song of the Year for "I'm So Sad that You're Happy" by the same organization.

In 2004, Alexander received several awards such as Songwriter of the Year – JP Folks Music Awards, Best Female Rock Vocalist – All Access Music Awards, and Special Achievement Pop Artist – Los Angeles Music Awards.

In 2005, her next album Angels & Demons won Los Angeles Music Awards' Independent Pop Album of the Year in 2006 and was nominated also for Album of the Year. Alexander appeared on The Mark & Brian Show in support of Jani Lane from Warrant, Metal Mania Stripped (VH1). She was a stand-out during that performance and Mark & Brian had her back in-studio to perform her own material. This appearance sparked a boost in sales and an influx of new fans. At this point in her career, Alexander signed with the William Morris Agency as booking agents and toured supporting artists such as America and Joe Bonamassa.

In June 2006, Alexander's song "4 Hours" (originally released on Angels and Demons) appeared on a compilation album entitled Eclectic Cafe on Water Music Records, alongside Aimee Mann, Delirium with Sarah McLachlan, Echo & the Bunnymen, Tracy Bonham, among other notable artists.

Later that year, Alexander was the winner of NBC's Star Tomorrow. When presented with the prize of a record deal, Alexander decided to stay true to her self-funded label, JamCat Records, and declined the deal. She used the wave of exposure and internet popularity to crowd-fund her next project, Wobble with the World.

In 2007, Wobble with the World, was produced by her long-time collaborators Dave Darling and Paul Trudeau. The iTunes Store version of the album contained an extra bonus track "Slow Motion Miracle", proceeds of which go to a cancer support center charity. It was nominated for South Bay Music Awards, Independent Album of the Year, Best Female Vocals, and AC Artist of the Year. Alexander was also nominated for Best Songwriting in Rock City News. The album featured a guest appearance by Michael Bacon on "Bloom".

In 2009, she performed for the videogame White Knight Chronicles II soundtrack with the songs "Fly! -My Bluebrid-", "The Battlefield Flower" and "White Knight Chronicles 'Travelers'" which was released in 2010.

Following all this success, Alexander took a break from the music scene to focus on starting a family. She and her husband, Chip Moreland, welcomed twins in 2009 and she spent three years on hiatus raising her daughters.

Every Rise and Fall, released March 2012, tackled issues such as fertility, marriage, motherhood, aging, birth and death. Produced by Dave Darling, Every Rise and Fall featured another guest appearance by Michael Bacon on cello, and musicians Arlan Oscar on organ and Wurlitzer, Carl Sealove on stand up bass/ bass guitar, Chip Moreland on drums, Dave Darling on guitar/backing vocals, and Alecander on vocals and piano.

== Blue Élan Records ==
In 2013, Alexander was finally getting back to music, performing, and touring with her longtime pals, the Bacon Brothers (Kevin & Michael Bacon). In the midst of finding her footing, she was diagnosed with breast cancer in summer of 2013. Alexander handled the experience of a double mastectomy and reconstruction in the ways she knows best – by openly sharing the journey with humor and blunt honesty through song.

After reading about Alexander's journey on social media, Kirk Pasich (an entertainment and insurance attorney with Pasich LLP who was previously familiar with Alexander's work) reached out to help. In response to her battle with her insurance company over coverage, Pasich offered Alexander a choice: represent her pro-bono in a class action lawsuit, or provide the balance of the funds needed to finish her latest fan-funded record that was currently in production. Alexander chose the latter.

When the record Curve was finished, Alexander invited Pasich into the studio to listen down from top to bottom. As the last song ended, Pasich told Alexander she "had to do something with [this record]" to which she replied "you should start a record label". And thus, Blue Élan Records was born, founded by Pasich and his son Connor Pasich (who played a guitar solo on "Heels Over Head", Curve's first single).

As Blue Élan's first artist, Alexander released her newest record Curve in October 2014. Among the glowing reviews, AXS.com declared "by fearlessly exploring such intriguingly honest territory, Cindy has branded Curve her most compelling work to date".

In January 2015, it was announced that Curve won the L.A. Music Critic's Award for Best Female CD.

Alongside Curve, Cindy's critically acclaimed catalog with Blue Élan includes Christmas is Here, An American Girl, Deep Waters, Nowhere to Hide, and While the Angels Sigh. Cindy also added her voice to multiple Blue Élan compilation albums including A Blue Elan Christmas, Precious To Me, and Watching The Time: A Tribute to Gerry Beckley.

After the COVID-19 Pandemic and a forced hiatus, Cindy had some time think of her career and path forward which led her to signing a deal with Blue Élan's new imprint, KZZ Music, which would offer more artistic freedom and ability to work with a new production and marketing team who would think outside the box.

== KZZ Music ==
In late 2021, Cindy began working on her newest project with producer Paul Bushnell (The Commitments, Ednaswap, Tim McGraw, Neil Young, Phil Collins, Jason Mraz, Niall Horan). In 2022, the album was recorded at Clearlake Studios in Los Angeles, CA with a collection of musicians. Musicians on the album include Zac Rae (Death Cab for Cutie, Stevie Nicks, Leonard Cohen, Ringo Starr, Lana Del Rey, Dua Lipa) on keys, Thomas Lang (Peter Gabriel, Robbie Williams, Glenn Hughes, Falco) on drums, David Levita (Tim McGraw, Dr. Dre, Alanis Morrisette, Eminem, Sara Bareilles, Five for Fighting, Sheryl Crow, Lana Del Rey) on guitar, Paul Bushnell on bass, and Executive Produced by Kirk Pasich, who was also key in the song selection process.

Messy was released in July 2023.

Cindy collaborated with photographer Bob Kolbrener, protégé and colleague of the late Ansel Adams, on the lyric video for House Without Windows, the royalty proceeds of which were donated to the Alzheimer's Association. Cindy’s mother died in 2020 after battling a rare form of Alzheimer's called Posterior Cortical Atrophy with Lewy Body Disease, while Bob Kolbrener also lost his wife Sharon to Alzheimer's. The collaboration between the two was a creative process that mirrored each other's art forms in tribute.

Cindy also collaborated with American actor, comedian, singer-songwriter, and director Scout Durwood on her music video for Messy's debut single, Call Us What We Are. The video was co-directed by Durwood and filmmaker D'Andree Galipeau. The video stars Cindy Alexander as a stalker version of herself alongside Catherine McCafferty and VanDuncan Johnson-Phillips.

== Winner of NBC's Star Tomorrow ==
NBC announced that it would air Star Tomorrow in February 2006. Mottola severed his relationship with the show in June 2006, and producer David Foster was brought in. The prize was subsequently changed from a recording contract with Mottola's Casablanca Records to a contract with Foster's label.

Hosted by Michele Merkin, StarTomorrow premiered on NBC and NBC.com on July 31, 2006, when a one-hour show about the auditions aired on NBC. In a format similar to American Idol, 92 bands competed in weekly head-to-head competition, and bands that won were then given the chance to compete in the competition's second round.

The show finale was in November 2006 and was eventually won by Alexander. However, the show's contract was so bad that none of the Top 5 (Alexander, Bob Gentry, Brooke Ramel, Hydra FX, Blake Cody) bands signed. NBC officially ceased production on March 26, 2007.

=== Judges ===
- Travis Barker
- Mick Fleetwood
- David Foster
- Billy Gibbons
- Rob Tannenbaum

== Breast Cancer Advocacy ==
=== Breastcancer.org ===
As a breast cancer survivor, Alexander became involved with Breastcancer.org as she used their resources many times herself during her journey from diagnosis to recovery. Her desire to give back to others led to her being named the Celebrity Ambassador for Breastcancer.org. In this role, she helps to spread the message about Breastcancer.org while she is performing on tour and at various public appearances.

=== The Kay Yow Cancer Fund ===
In 2017, Alexander toured extensively across the US raising money on her "Play It Forward" tour for The Kay Yow Cancer Fund. She had heard about former NC State basketball coach Kay Yow when she was asked to sing the National Anthem at a UCLA Women's Basketball Play4Kay game. Kay was first diagnosed with breast cancer in 1987, and died on January 24, 2009, after facing her third bout with the disease. Before her death, she joined forces with the Women's Basketball Coaches Association (WBCA) and The V Foundation for Cancer Research to form the Kay Yow Cancer Fund, a 501 (c)(3) charitable organization committed to being a part of finding an answer in the fight against women's cancers, through raising money for scientific research, assisting the underserved and unifying people for a common cause. Due to the unique partnership with The V Foundation, they use their Scientific Advisory Committee to ensure all donations support only the cancer research projects with the most potential to find a cure.

=== Dr. Kristi Funk, author of Breasts ===
Alexander teamed up with Dr. Kristi Funk, author of Breasts for her book launch party at Amoeba Records in Hollywood, California.

== Discography ==
=== Albums ===
- 1999 – See Red (JamCat Records)
- 2003 – SMASH (JamCat Records)
- 2005 – Angels & Demons (JamCat Records)
- 2007 – Wobble with the World (JamCat Records)
- 2012 – Every Rise And Fall (JamCat Records)
- 2014 – Curve (Blue Élan Records)
- 2014 – Christmas is Here (EP) (Blue Élan Records)
- 2015 – An American Girl (Blue Élan Records)
- 2016 – Deep Waters (Blue Élan Records)
- 2018 – Nowhere to Hide (Blue Élan Records)
- 2021 – While the Angels Sigh (Blue Élan Records)
- 2023 – Messy (KZZ Music)

=== Soundtracks ===
- 2001 – Sugar & Spice (Trauma Records/New Line Records)
- 2010 – White Knight Chronicles 2 ('Aniplex Inc.')

=== Compilations ===
- 2002 – Chilled Sirens (Water Music Records/Universal)
- 2003 – Sunday Brunch (Treadstone Records/Columbia Records Japan)
- 2005 – Back Home (Benefits Children International)
- 2006 – Eclectic Café (Water Music Records/Universal)

== TV & Film Placements ==
- 2001 – Sugar & Spice
- 2010 – White Knight Chronicles 2
- 2012 - So You Think You Can Dance, Sam Schreffler Audition Interview, "Wonderful" Every Rise and Fall
- 2012 - So You Think You Can Dance, Chehon Wespi-Tschopp Audition Interview, "Turning Into You" Every Rise and Fall
- 2019 Season 1 Pandora (TV Series), Black Hole Lounge scene:
  - Premier Episode – "I'm Okay"
  - Episode 2 – "Heaven Knows"
  - "Angels and Demons"
- 2020 Season 2, Pandora (TV Series), Black Hole Lounge scene:
  - "Domino"
  - "Kamikaze"
  - "Unavailable Billy"
