= Israel Film Festival =

Annual film festival held in Los Angeles, New York and Miami, USA

The Israel Film Festival is a film festival that takes place annually in the United States in three cities: Los Angeles, New York and Miami. It is the largest showcase of Israeli cinema in the United States. Founded in 1982 by Meir Fenigstein, a former drummer for the Israeli rock band, Kaveret, the festival is the premier showcase for new work from Israeli independent filmmakers. The festival comprises official sections for Israeli dramatic and documentary films, both feature-length films and short films, and television dramas.

The festival is a production of IsraFest Foundation, Inc., a 501(c)(3) nonprofit organization based in Los Angeles whose mission is to enrich the American vision of Israeli life and culture through the medium of film, and to foster an intercultural dialogue through conversations with visiting Israeli artists. The festival is credited with helping Israeli films get Hollywood exposure.

Each year, the festival hosts a Gala Awards Dinner at the Beverly Hilton with a Hollywood Salute to Israel and bestows coveted IFF Awards to individuals for Acting, Producing, Visionary and Lifetime Achievements. On October 20, 2010, IFF Awards were presented to Richard Dreyfuss (Career Achievement Award), Ryan Kavanaugh (Outstanding Achievement in Film Award), Jon Landau (Visionary Award) and Avi Lerner (Lifetime Achievement Award).

The Israel Film Festival has distinguished itself from other festivals by being a traveling event that has been held in four major American cities: New York, Miami, Chicago and Los Angeles.

At the 2018 Israel Film Festival in Beverly Hills, Yossi Dina stepped on stage and tried to physically remove film producer Jason Blum while delivering his speech.
