= Aria Johnson =

American singer-songwriter

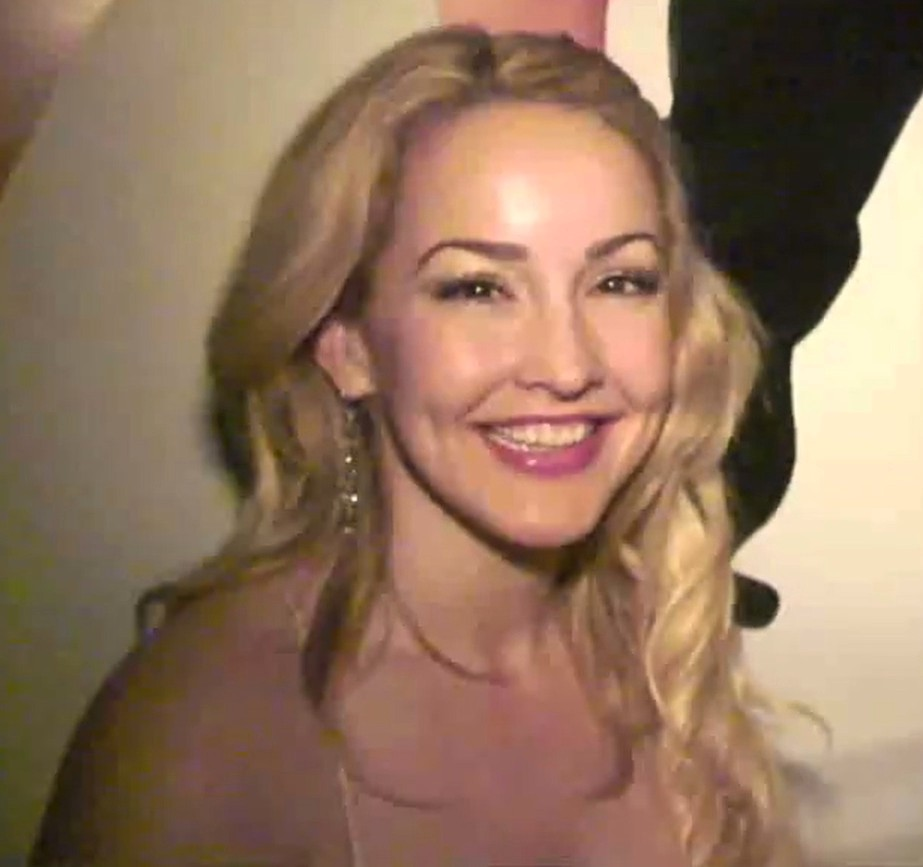
- Johnson in 2009

Background information
- Born: Newark, California
- Genres: Pop; Acoustic; Adult Contemporary
- Occupations: pop singer; songwriter; television actress
- Years active: 2005–present
- Label: APM Music
- Website: ariajohnson.com

Aria Johnson is an American singer-songwriter. In 2007, she starred on NBC's Star Tomorrow for 13 episodes.

Johnson sang her original music and won 13 out of 14 episodes, almost winning the competition. Aria has starred as the music expert in five seasons (62 Episodes) of Beverly Hills Pawn, a Reelz Channel television show. Aria currently owns The Golden Voice a company that develops celebrity recording artists.

== Biography ==
According to her official biography, Johnson was born and raised in Newark, California, and later moved to Los Angeles to further her career in music.

Johnson's early influences toward music came from her mother Merrilee Johnson and her father, Mike Johnson, a former bass guitarist for the band Bogus Thunder and current bass guitarist for Bad Boy Bruce & the Blues Mob (2007 to current); (Bad Boy Bruce band members include: Bruce Collett, Allan Andersen, Mike Johnson and Matthew Albarico).

As a child through her early teen years, Johnson Won Overall Grand Champion of the California State Talent Competition for vocals every year from 1996 through 2001. As an early teen, Aria was in a girl group called Reality, and as a late teen she fronted a band Lucky Six that toured California and Las Vegas also performing in San Francisco, San Jose and Los Gatos, and when asked to tour Europe, Hong Kong and China, Aria instead decided to focus on solo efforts and moved to Los Angeles.

== Career ==
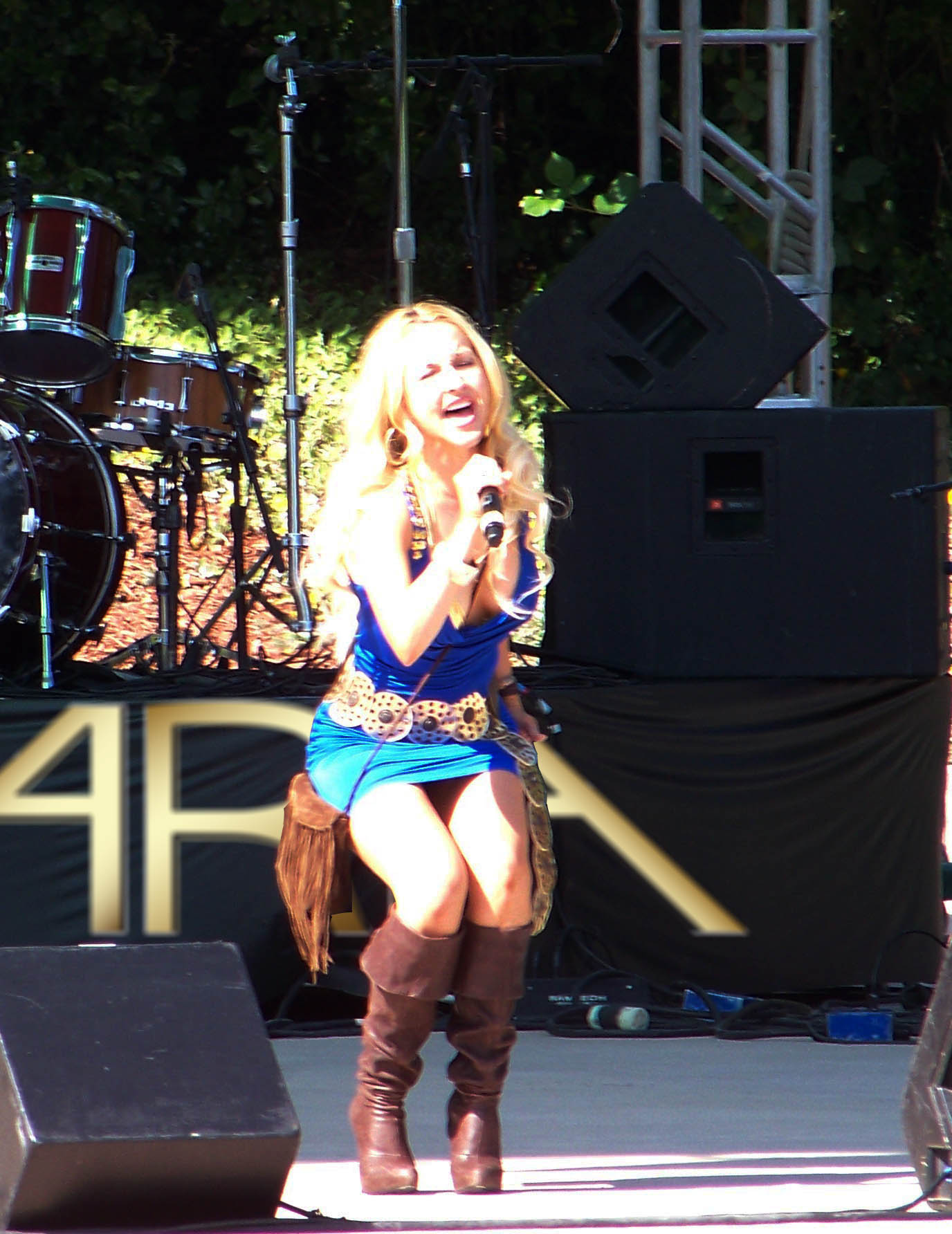
Johnson performing in 2009

In 2005, Johnson recorded a self-titled EP (Extended Play) that was never released to the public, however some of the songs from the EP were licensed: Her song Beauty aired on Tyra Banks' America's Next Top Model; Two other songs from her EP, Reason To Believe, and Bleeding aired on NBC's Star Tomorrow. In 2007, she beat the top 92 bands in the country and made it 13 of the 14 weeks in the competition Star Tomorrow.

Of Johnson's performance, producer David Foster said. "She sings good, she looks good... she's got something special", However, it was reported that the offered contract with Warner Brothers was so bad that none of the top three artists wished to sign, even after winning their slots in the competition. Aria starred in MTV's Little Talent Show. Aria and Carvelli's "Something's Up Tonight", was Canada's Top Dance Pick Dixie Dance Kings Dance Charts in 2010.

"Something's Up Tonight" was also cited as Best Dance Breakout Song 2010 according to the Masspool DJ Association in Canada. Johnson starred on 5 seasons of the #1 TV show on Reelz Channel called Beverly Hills Pawn, by Reelz Channel. Aria stars in 62 episodes as the music expert.

As of 2011, Johnson works with major label recording artists. Her team offers vocal coaching and artist development and has broken records with multi-platinum album sales, over 100 million views on YouTube, and over 50 million album sales.

=== Filmography ===
- Hidden Beach Records Dance Compilation (2006) (Commercial)
- Celebrity PSA: Humane Society (2011) (Commercial)
- Beauty (2006) (Music Video)

Television

- Walk The Walk (2006)
- Little Talent Show (2006) MTV
- Super Jane (2007)
- Star Tomorrow (13 episodes, 2006) NBC
- SharkDiver: The Movie (2010) (Docudrama)
- How Do I Look? (2010) The Style Network
- The Complex (2011) (Bravo Pilot)
- Pawn 90210 (2011) ( E Entertainment pilot)
- Beverly Hills Pawn (2015) (62 episodes)

=== Studio albums ===
- 2009: If You're Down(album)

==== Songs ====
- 2009: Diamond Rings |Written by Aria Johnson
- 2009: If You're Down |Written by Aria Johnson and Gerald Legaspi Pseud. “Sonny”
- 2009: Being A Woman |Written by Aria Johnson Pseud. and Gerald Legaspi Pseud. “Sonny”
- 2009: Spain (Let's Do It Again)| Written by Aria Johnson
- 2009: The Time of Our Lives |Written by Aria Johnson
- 2009: The Story of my Life | Written by Aria Johnson and Gerald Legaspi Pseud. “Sonny”
- 2009: Rock Me | Written by Aria Johnson
- 2009: Better Off | Written by Aria Johnson
- 2009: Angel | Written by: Gerald Legaspi Pseud “Sonny Legaspi”
- 2009: Hold on Me Feat. Tower Of Power| Written by Aria Johnson
- 2009: I Need You Tonight| Written by Aria Johnson
- 2009: Rose Colored Glass | Written by Aria Johnson

=== Other albums ===
- 2006: EP Aria(album)|Aria
- 2006: Release Me | Written by Aria Johnson
- 2005: Reason To Believe | Written by Aria Johnson
- 2005: Crashing Down | Written by Aria Johnson
- 2005: Beauty | Written by Aria Johnson
- 2005: Eight-Thirty to Five Thirty | Written by Aria Johnson
- 2005: Bleeding | Written by Aria Johnson

== Awards ==
- 2012- eWorld Music Award: Best Female Performer
- 2010- World Music And Dance Award: Artist Of The Year
- 2009- Billboard Award: Song of the Year for "If You're Down"
- 2001- Overall Grand Champion: California State Talent Competition
- 2000- Overall Grand Champion: California State Talent Competition
- 1999- Overall Grand Champion: California State Talent Competition
- 1998- Overall Grand Champion: California State Talent Competition
- 1997- Overall Grand Champion: California State Talent Competition
- 1996- Overall Grand Champion: California State Talent Competition

== Influences ==
On her "official" Myspace page, Aria relates how her musical influences are Aretha Franklin, Etta James, Mariah Carey, Donna Summer, and The Supremes as well as "deep soulful house music". Aria's music includes themes of love, which have been called "multi-generational...timeless".
