= Shallow Graves =

Studio album by India Ramey
- Released: September 4, 2020
- Studios: House of Blues Studios (Berry Hill, Nashville)
- Genres: Americana; Country
- Length: 31:13
- Label: Self-released
- Producer: Mark Petaccia

India Ramey chronology
Snake Handler (2017)	Shallow Graves (2020)	Baptized by the Blaze (2024)

Shallow Graves is the fourth studio album by American singer-songwriter India Ramey. Produced by Mark Petaccia, the album was recorded at House of Blues Studios, now called East Iris Studios, in Berry Hill, Nashville, and self-released on September 4, 2020.

Noting the phrase “post-apocalyptic western” coined by Ramey to describe the album, reviewers outlined her use of Southern noir themes to comment on toxic personalities and upper class hypocrisy. Also featured in reviews is the song "Hole in the World", Ramey's tribute to her songwriting exemplar Gord Downie of the Canadian roots band The Tragically Hip.

The songs "Up to No Good", "Montgomery Behind Me", and "King of the Ashes" were each released as singles from Shallow Graves.

== Track listing ==
All songs by India Ramey except (10).

1. "Shallow Graves" - 2:52
2. "Up to No Good" - 3:05
3. "The Witch" - 3:41
4. "Keep Hope Alive" - 2:41
5. "Debutante Ball" - 2:59
6. "You and Me Against the World" - 3:36
7. "Hole in the World" - 1:59
8. "Montgomery Behind Me" - 3:21
9. "King of the Ashes" - 3:41
10. "Angel of Death" (Hank Williams) - 3:18

== Personnel ==
Credits adapted from the album's liner notes.

=== Musicians ===
- India Ramey – lead vocals, acoustic guitar, background vocals
- Carson Medders – electric guitar
- Will Medders – baritone guitar, electric guitar, drums, percussion
- Ethan Ballenger – baritone guitar, electric guitar
- Cheyenne Medders – acoustic guitar, bass guitar
- Mark Petaccia – acoustic guitar, drums, percussion
- John Simpson – pedal steel guitar
- Brian Wright – lap steel guitar
- Noah Denney – bass guitar, drums, percussion
- Eleonore Denig – strings
- Sally Jaye – background vocals
- Anna Harris – background vocals
- Ashley Petaccia – background vocals

=== Production ===
- Mark Petaccia – producer, mixing, recording
- Alex McCollough – mastering
- Adam Jones – art direction, package design
- Stacie Huckeba – photography
