= Baptized by the Blaze =

Studio album by India Ramey
- Released: August 23, 2024
- Studio: Station West Studios (Nashville)
- Genre: Country
- Length: 30:08
- Label: Mule Kick Records
- Producer: Luke Wooten

India Ramey chronology
Shallow Graves (2020)	Baptized by the Blaze (2024)	Villain Era (2026)

Baptized by the Blaze is the fifth studio album by American country singer-songwriter India Ramey. Produced by Luke Wooten, the album was recorded at Station West Studios in Nashville and released on August 23, 2024 by Mule Kick Records. With the raucous and personal collection of honky-tonk music, Ramey documented her arduous recovery from addiction to prescription Klonopin, celebrating emergence from therapy that strengthened her ability to get past her own ingratiating personality traits.

== Background ==
Ramey was deeply affected by witnessing domestic violence during childhood, when her father abused her mother. Although she learned ballet and was taught music by her grandfather, bluegrass musician Rufus Clayton Turner, she decided to pursue a law career as a prosecutor, saying “I thought if I was helping people like my Mom, I would like being a lawyer more”. However, working on domestic violence cases caused PTSD symptoms which Ramey handled with the anxiety medication Klonopin.

When the COVID-19 pandemic began, Ramey worried supply chain problems would affect her Klonopin prescription, and she attempted to reduce her usage of the drug. Ramey was unable to self-withdraw from Klonopin and put herself in rehab immediately following the release of her fourth album, Shallow Graves, in September 2020.

Ramey was emboldened by therapy during rehab. She explained that after a year of therapy, she discovered imagining psychological stress as an avalanche, and seeing herself as a mountain, strengthened her. The realization inspired Ramey to write "The Mountain", which serves as the centerpiece track on Baptized by the Blaze.

Producer Luke Wooten is responsible for recommending the inclusion of the title cut, an older song which Ramey had put aside because members of her group didn't like it. She followed Wooten's advice as part of reducing her self-doubt, thinking the song fit with the album's theme of redemption and recalled the myth of the Phoenix.

== Reception ==
Reviews of Baptized by the Blaze ranged from positive to enthusiastic. Writing in No Depression, Rachel Cholst recognized songwriting skill in the opening track "Ain't My First Rodeo", which other writers included with "Go on Git" and "It Could Have Been Me" as showing that Ramey had skillfully established a theme of exclaiming empowerment in assessing insincere or boring lovers in her songwriting.

The urgency and impact of the band was noted, with reviewers remarking on the overall effect Seth Taylor, James Mitchell, Scotty Sanders, Tommy Hardin, and Alyson Prestwood had as the session players recorded most of their parts in one day. Critics were impressed with the authenticity of the honky-tonk atmosphere and efficiency of Ramey's ability to balance complex human conditions and emotions in clever songwriting, with Shawn Underwood of Twangville comparing Ramey favorably to country legend Loretta Lynn.

== Track listing ==
All songs by India Ramey.

1. "Ain’t My First Rodeo" - 2:47
2. "Baptized by the Blaze" - 2:21
3. "Silverado" - 2:14
4. "Piece of My Mind" - 2:38
5. "She Ain't Never Coming Home" - 2:59
6. "The Mountain" - 3:00
7. "Down for the Count" - 2:39
8. "It Could Have Been Me" - 3:05
9. "Never Going Back" - 3:08
10. "Rotten" - 2:45
11. "Go on Git" - 2:32

== Personnel ==
Credits adapted from the album's liner notes.

=== Musicians ===
- India Ramey – lead vocals
- Seth Taylor – acoustic guitars
- Tommy Hardin – drums
- Alyson Prestwood – bass guitar
- Scotty Sanders – pedal steel guitar
- James Mitchell – electric guitars

=== Production ===
- Luke Wooten – producer, mixing, mastering
- Alex Gust – executive producer
- Pamela Esposito – design
- Stacie Huckeba – photography
