= Janiva Magness =

American singer (born 1957)

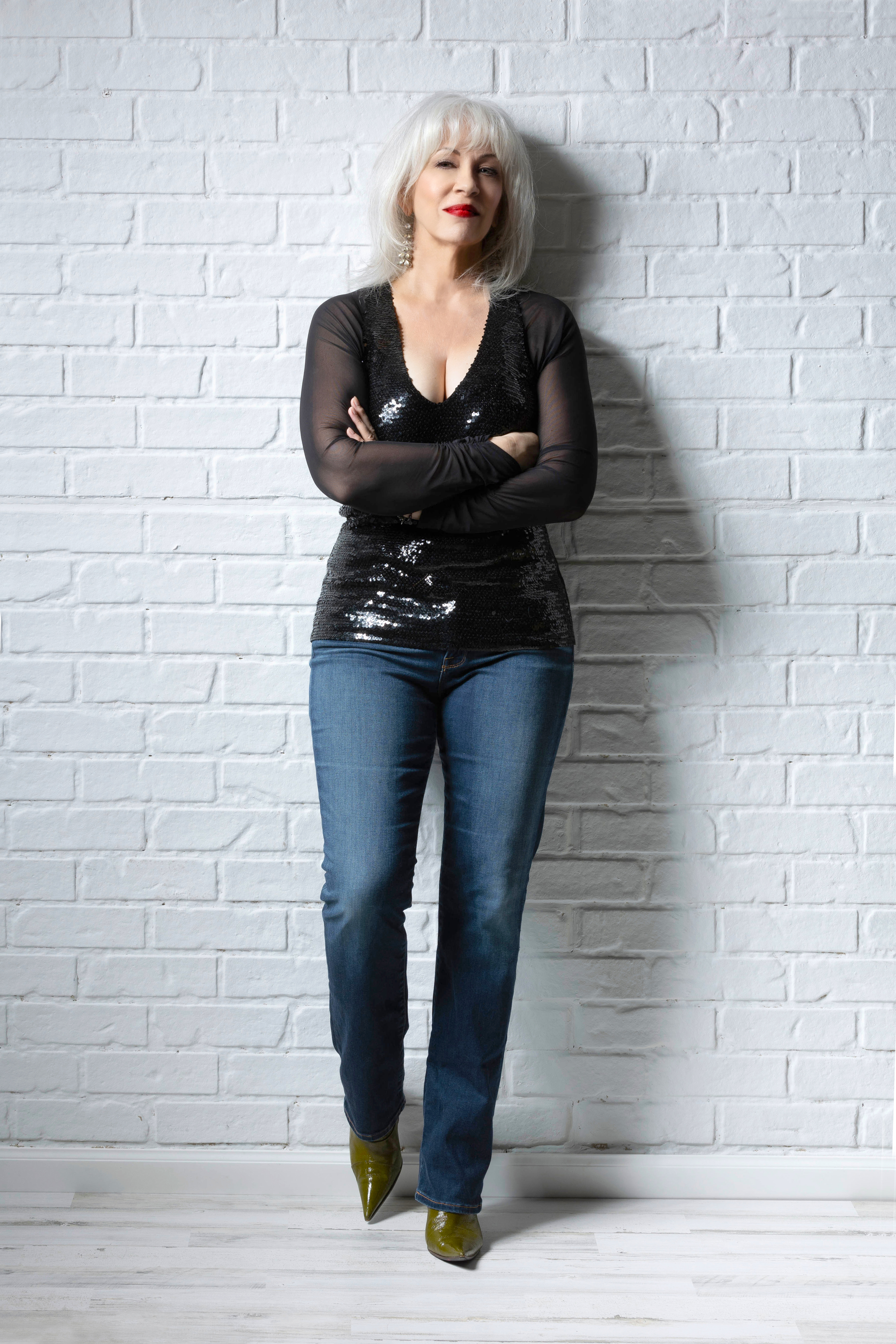
- Magness in 2022

Background information
- Born: January 30, 1957 (age 69); Detroit, Michigan, United States
- Genres: Electric blues, soul Americana
- Occupations: Singer, songwriter, author
- Instrument: Vocals
- Years active: 1980s-present
- Labels: Various including NorthernBlues, Alligator, Blue Élan, Fathead
- Website: Official website

Janiva Magness (born January 30, 1957) is an American Grammy Award nominated blues, soul, and Americana singer, songwriter, and author. To date she has released 16 albums.

The Blues Foundation named Magness the B.B. King Entertainer of the Year in 2009, becoming only the second woman, after Koko Taylor, to be so honored. The award was presented by B.B. King himself and Bonnie Raitt. In 2014 she released her second album of all originals entitled Original which earned her the award for Song of the Year. Magness has earned seven Blues Music Awards with 29 similar nominations. USA Today stated, "Magness is a blues star."

In 2019, Magness published her memoir "Weeds Like Us" and the audiobook version was released in 2022. "We get to relive her career with her, as she discovers her own talents, right up to her work with the great Dave Darling over the past decade. It's a ride that is both thrilling and heartbreaking. But the spoiler is, we know how it ends, because we know that Magness is still producing incredible music. And she's still a badass." – LA Weekly's Book of the Month, Brett Callwood. "When you're singing "The Blues," credibility is essential. You can talk the talk, but if you didn't walk the walk, people can tell. Janiva Magness has been singing the blues professionally for decades, but don't think for a minute that she didn't get to where she is now without having a struggle with hard times. And where she is now, it's a very good place: a highly regarded, award-winning singer and musician with an international following and a cache of critically well-received albums." – The Recoup, Joseph Kyle

== Life and career ==
Magness was born in Detroit, Michigan. She lost both parents to suicide before she reached her mid-teens, and was placed in a series of a dozen foster homes.

Having been initially inspired by the music in her father's record collection, an underage Magness attended an Otis Rush concert in Minneapolis that changed her outlook. Magness later recalled, "Otis played as if his life depended on it. There was a completely desperate, absolute intensity. I knew, whatever it was, I needed more of it." Studying to become an engineer, she worked in a recording studio in Saint Paul, Minnesota, when she was coerced into doing some backing singing. Her work, which included backing Kid Ramos and R. L. Burnside, led her to Phoenix, Arizona and in forming her own band, the Mojomatics. They enjoyed local success before Magness relocated in 1986 to Los Angeles. Her first album, More Than Live, was released in 1991; her second release, titled It Takes One to Know One, was released in 1997. In 1999, Magness starred in a stage production of It Ain't Nothin' But the Blues, at the David Geffen Theater in Westwood, Los Angeles.

Three independent releases followed before Magness was signed to a recording contract by NorthernBlues Music. They released Bury Him at the Crossroads (2004) and Do I Move You? (2006). Both albums were co-produced by Magness and Colin Linden, with the former earning them both Canadian Maple Blues Award for Producers of the Year. Do I Move You? reached number 8 on the Billboard Blues Album Chart.

In 2008, Magness signed with Alligator Records releasing What Love Will Do. The Chicago Sun-Times stated, "Her songs run the gamut of emotions from sorrow to joy. A master of the lowdown blues who is equally at ease surrounded by funk or soul sounds, Magness invigorates every song with a brutal honesty." She toured widely in Canada, Europe and across the United States.

The Devil Is an Angel Too, appeared in 2010, and Stronger for It in 2012. The latter included some of her own songs, the first album to do so since her debut effort in 1991.

In 2013, Magness was nominated in five categories for more Blues Music Awards (BMA). In 2014, Magness left Alligator Records re-launching her own label, Fathead Records, and released Original, saying, "I've had an entire career up to this point of being an interpreter of other people’s songs. And I’ve been fine with that. But it became necessary to change that thinking. This record is titled Original because its eleven original tracks. I’m co-writer on seven of the eleven tracks."

Magness won her seventh BMA, the 'Contemporary Blues Female Artist' category, at the 2015 Blues Music Awards ceremony. In 2016, she signed to Blue Elan Records which is also the home to Jack Tempchin, Gerry Buckley, and Rusty Baker. Her 2016 album, Love Wins Again, debuted at number 5 on the Billboard Blues Chart, number 2 on iTunes Blues, reached number 1 on the Blues radio chart, made Living Blues Radio at number 2, and spent two months on the Americana radio chart, and earned her first Grammy Award nomination.

In the years 2016, 2018, and 2019 she performed at the Americana Music Conference and Festival in Nashville, to further cement her cross-over into the genre.

== Festivals ==
Magness has performed at various music festivals in the U.S. and Europe, including Notodden Blues Festival (in 2007 and 2008), at Memphis in May (in 2006 and 2010), and Byron Bay Bluesfest (2016). She performed at Mahindra Blues Festival, in Mumbai, India, in 2017.

== Personal life ==
Magness is a national spokesperson for Casey Family Programs, promoting National Foster Care Month, Foster Care Alumni of America, and Child Welfare League.

== Discography ==
=== Albums ===
Year	Title	Record label
1991	More Than Live	Fathead Records
1997	It Takes One to Know One	Fathead Records
1999	My Bad Luck Soul	Blues Leaf Records
2001	Blues Ain't Pretty	Blues Leaf Records
2003	Use What You Got	Blues Leaf Records
2004	Bury Him at the Crossroads	NorthernBlues Music
2006	Do I Move You?	NorthernBlues Music
2008	What Love Will Do	Alligator Records
2010	The Devil is an Angel Too	Alligator Records
2012	Stronger for It	Alligator Records
2014	Original	Fathead Records
2016	Love Wins Again	Blue Elan
2017	Blue Again	Blue Elan
2018	Love Is An Army	Blue Elan
2019	Change in the Weather	Blue Elan
2022	Hard to Kill	Fathead Records
2025	Back For Me	Blue Elan

== See also ==
- List of electric blues musicians
