= The Vegabonds =

American New South Rock band

- Origin: Alabama, United States
- Genres: Country rock; Southern rock; Hard Rock; Blues rock; Jam Band
- Years active: 2009–present
- Label: Blue Élan Records
- Members: Daniel Allen; Richard Forehand; Paul Bruens; Beau Cooper; Bryan Harris
- Past members: Jamie Hallen; Alex Cannon
- Website: thevegabonds.com

The Vegabonds are a Nashville-based American New South Rock band from Auburn, Alabama, United States. The lineup consists Richard Forehand (lead guitar, vocals), Paul Bruens (bass), Beau Cooper (songwriter, keyboard, vocals), and Bryan Harris (drums). They have released four studio albums, ten singles, and a live album.

== Music career ==
The Vegabonds formed in Alabama in 2009, and released their debut album, Dear Revolution, in 2010. They have performed throughout the United States both as headliner, and as the supporting act for artists such as Big Head Todd, Gregg Allman, Jimmy Herring, Anderson East, Blackberry Smoke, and Lynyrd Skynyrd. Their second album, Southern Sons, released in 2012, followed by What We're Made Of in 2016.

The band moved to Blue Élan Records in 2018 and released V the next year, produced by Tom Tapley, with songs co-written by Ross Beasley. 2019 also saw the band release "Colorado Evergreen" as a standalone track, along with a pair of singles covering Tom Petty's "You Wreck Me," and The Band's "The Night They Drove Old Dixie Down."

After playing shows at colleges around the Southeastern United States, in 2012 the band began touring internationally, playing shows alongside acts including Whiskey Myers, co-headlining with Mike and the Moonpies, and performing regularly at festivals like Mile of Music and The Peach Music Festival. 2021 saw the release of Live at West End Sound, a live album comprising new and older originals, and previously unreleased tracks and covers.

== Current members ==
- Richard Forehand – lead guitar, backing vocals (2009–present)
- Paul "Big Bear" Bruens – bass (2009–present)
- Beau Cooper – songwriter, keyboards, backing vocals (2014–present)
- Bryan "Freedom Eagle" Harris – drums (2009–present)

== Previous members ==
- Daniel Allen - lead vocals, songwriter (2009–2026)
- Jamie Hallen – keyboards (2009–2014)
- Alex Cannon – guitar (2009–2014)

== Discography ==
=== Studio albums ===
Title	Album details
Dear Revolution	Release date: May 24, 2010; Label: Vega Records
Southern Sons	Release date: January 9, 2012; Label: Vega Records
What We're Made Of	Release date: February 24, 2016; Label: Vega Records
V	Release date: January 18, 2019; Label: Blue Élan Records
Sinners and Saints	Release date: September 24, 2021; Label: Blue Élan Records

=== Singles ===
Year	Title	Album
2017	"Long Haired Country Boy"	
2017	"Partyin' With Strangers"	V
2018	"Everything I Need"	V
2018	"I Ain't Having It"	V
2019	"Best I Can"	V
2019	"Colorado Evergreen"	
2019	"You Wreck Me"	
2019	"The Night They Drove Old Dixie Down"	
2020	"Burnout"	
2021	"Juke and Jive"	

=== Music videos ===
Year	Video	Director
2015	"Oh My Lord"	
2016	"Take A Ride"	
2016	"The Hammer"	Tim Angst
2017	"Long Haired Country Boy"	
2017	"Partyin' With Strangers"	
2018	"Everything I Need"	
2019	"Best I Can"	Adam Porter
2020	"When The Smoke Clears Up"	
