= Little Talent Show =

- Written by: Howard Kuperberg; Opus Moreschi
- Country of origin: United States
- Original language: English

Production
- Executive producer: Michael Canter
- Producers: Matt Gallagher; Todd Chambers; Opus Moreschi
- Cinematography: Christine Ka'aloa; Andre Martinez
- Editors: Billy DiCicco; Matt Gallagher; Travis Rust; Chris Smith
- Camera setup: Multi-camera
- Production company: MTV Productions

Original release
- Release: September 18 – October 5, 2006

Little Talent Show is an MTV program that aired weekdays in the fall 2006 season.

Each episode, 7 contestants who felt they were a triple threat when it comes to singing, acting and dancing, competed against each other until 2 were chosen to go head to head in the "Triple Threat" round. After the final round a winner is selected and crowned the most talented performer of the episode and receive a five hundred dollar cash prize and a statuette.

== Judges ==
The hosts included Bryan Dattilo, Laurie Ann Gibson, and Kimberley Locke. Each contestant received feedback from a panel of celebrity judges, each one specializing in one of the categories. Gibson served as the dancing judge. She is a former "Fly Girl" and choreographer, having worked on the Making the Band series. Locke was most often the "singing judge". She was herself a finalist in the second season of American Idol and is a recording artist for Curb Records. Anthony Fedorov and Constantine Maroulis, both from American Idol's fourth season, occasionally sat in as singing judges. The show had alternated acting judges from episode to episode. These judges were Bryan Dattilo (Lucas Roberts on Days of Our Lives), Matt Cedeno (Brandon Walker on Days of Our Lives), Sean Kanan (Alan Quartermaine Jr. on General Hospital.) and Amy Davidson (Kerry Hennessy in 8 Simple Rules).

== Episodes/airdates ==
Each episode set a particular acting theme for the contestants.

- Back From War (October 5, 2006)
- Superhero Formula (October 4, 2006)
- Paranoia (October 3, 2006)
- Maniac Slasher (October 2, 2006)
- Possession (September 28, 2006)
- Jailbreak (September 27, 2006)
- Amnesia (September 26, 2006)
- Snitch (September 25, 2006)
- Hostile Witness (September 21, 2006)
- Fountain of Youth (September 20, 2006)
- U Robot (September 19, 2006)
- I'm Dyin' Bryan (September 18, 2006)
- MTV's Little Talent Show (September 18, 2006)

== Contestants ==
Contestants included Yara Camarena, singer Aria Johnson, comedian Garrett Gilchrist, Chavon James, Jesse Lewis, Sheila Tejada, Mickey Mello, Ismael Moreno, actor Kamahni Huck (winner), comedian Jesse Maddox, comedian Erik Anderson. Actor Byron Vasquez Jr. Adam Ryan and Merrin Mae Fuentebella were cut from pilot episode "I'm Dyin, Bryan."

== Reception ==
The show was panned by Hartford Courant critic Roger Catlin who wrote on his official blog TV Eye - What's on Television that MTV was tardy in coming forward with a musical competition show, and expressed disdain that none of the competitors seemed to have talent.

== Editing and controversy ==
The pilot episode "I'm Dyin, Bryan" was shot under the (false) title "Triple Threat." Most of the contestants were professional singers, actors, comedians or dancers of some kind, and were told that this was a serious (if small scale) talent competition rather than a spoof. Misleading editing was used to try to show the performers in the worst possible light. For example, professional singer Aria Johnson appears in the pilot but we don't hear her much of her singing in the final edit. Two contestants (Adam and Merrin) were edited out of the final pilot entirely, having performed well in all three segments.

The scripts to the acting competitions were written to be as ridiculous as possible and impossible to perform seriously (full of comically overlong words, or showing the actor regressing in age from an old man to a baby), so most of the cast performed them in a purposely comedic fashion (affecting silly accents, or doing impersonations of celebrities). Sadly this doesn't come across in the edit, as intentional comedy would have detracted from the show's idea of showing the contestants as untalented. There are some extremely odd edits in all the episodes, and it has been said by the show's unwitting cast members that overall, the final shows are much less funny or interesting than what was actually seen onset.

The judges were mostly shot separately from the contestants and seem to use the same script in each episode. This extends even to their comments to the contestants.

Extensive backstage material and a second singing competition ("Photograph") were also filmed for the pilot but not used. Contestants were urged to perform scripted material where they would bicker and infight with each other. Few of the contestants were interested in doing this, but similar scenes supposedly showing the contestants fighting amongst each other were shot for each episode with a similar script.

Contestants were also urged to shout out single scripted lines, like "I am the Triple Threat!" Although the contestants appearing on the show were not working from a script, and could be themselves onset, very few unscripted moments were used in the final edit, suggesting that the shows were written ahead of time, and then edited to that script without paying attention to what actually occurred onset.

In the shows as aired, the contestants are competing for a tiny $500 prize money. Onset there was no talk of prize money - everyone was given a $200 paycheck for a weekend's work, and the chance to be on MTV. Inevitably due to the format of the program, the contestants were disappointed and embarrassed when they saw the final product.
