= Natalie Gelman =

American folk-pop singer and songwriter (born 1985)

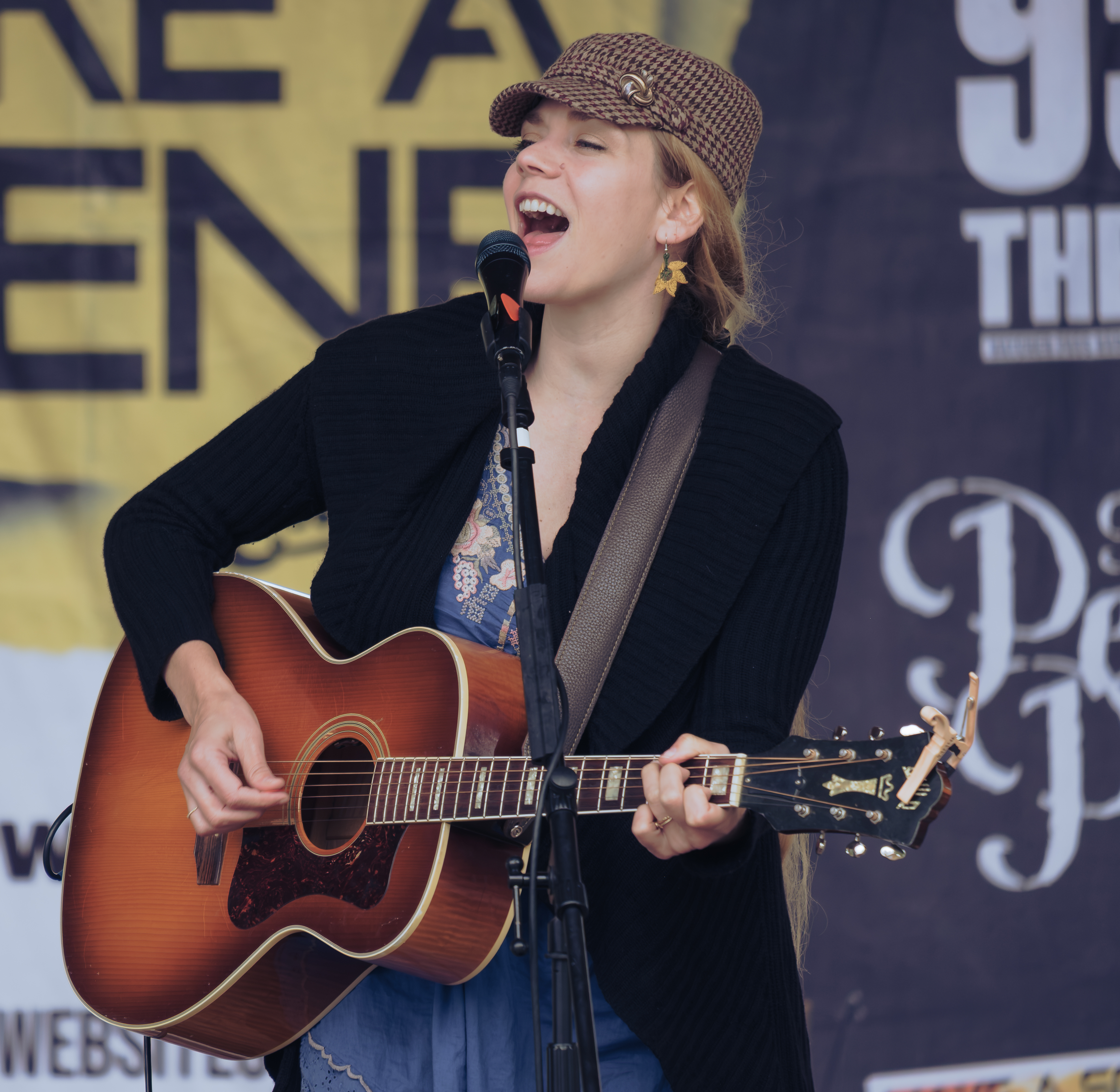
- Natalie Gelman live in 2026
- Born: July 17, 1985 (age 41); New York City, U.S.
- Occupations: Musician, songwriter
- Spouse: Brent Florence (m. 2016)
- Musical career
- Genres: Rock, indie pop, pop, folk rock
- Instruments: Vocals, guitar, piano, ukulele
- Years active: 2002–present
- Website: nataliegelman.com

Natalie Gelman (born July 17, 1985) is an American folk-pop singer and songwriter. Gelman is mainly known for her strong vocals, and has released four albums. She regularly tours southern California and other parts of the United States, performing at various venues and festivals. She has opened for Bon Jovi and played at Carnegie Hall.

== Early life ==
Gelman was born and raised in New York City. Her parents are both musicians: father a violinist and her mother a pianist. Gelman would often try to get attention by singing along to Disney films, and performing for her parents and three siblings at dinner. They both encouraged her musical aspirations with classical training. She wrote her first song when she was 11 years old, and picked up the guitar in high school. She attended LaGuardia High School of Music & Art and ultimately ended her education by graduating from the University of Miami in 2006 with a Bachelor of Music.

== Career ==
She started seriously performing at the age of 17, eventually busking on New York City Subway platforms. In 2006, after the release of her self-titled album, she started a 1,500-mile (2,400 km) tour from Miami to New York City on rollerblades to promote the album and support Children International. The trip took 48 days. After multiple attempts, she was ultimately accepted into the MTA's Music Under New York program.

She released her first self-titled LP in 2006. Her second album, an EP, produced by Charlie Midnight and Mark Needham, was released in 2013. The music video for the song "Most the While" was selected for the 2014 New Media Film Festival.

Gelman began a month-long tour with Alyse Black on July 16, 2014, through Washington state, Oregon and Montana.

On July 17, 2014, she started a crowdfunding campaign to fund a full-length LP.

On February 28, 2017, Natalie was chosen to open for Bon Jovi at the Golden 1 Center in Sacramento, California as part of his This House Is Not for Sale Tour.

In 2020, she was selected to play at the Folk Alliance International in New Orleans.

In 2021, Natalie released her third album, Moth to the Flame, on Blue Élan Records.

In 2024, Natalie embarked on her second Alaska tour, performing the 13-date tour across the state while eight months pregnant with her second child.

In 2026, Gelman returned to Alaska with her husband and two children for the Mountain Mama Tour. The tour was represented by Make A Scene Media. During the tour, she appeared on several Alaska media programs, including Alaska Landmine Radio and The Big Alaska Show. She was also featured on The Venue, a music television program broadcast by KTUU-TV.

== Personal life ==
Though she has lived a significant amount of time in New York, Gelman settled in Ojai, California in 2012. There she met Brent Florence, and after a courtship, they were married on October 14, 2016.

== Discography ==
=== Natalie Gelman ===
All tracks are written by Natalie Gelman, except where noted.

| No. | Title | Length |
|---|---|---|
| 1. | "Rest of the Way" (Natalie Gelman and Allan Douglas) | 3:03 |
| 2. | "Sweet July" | 3:09 |
| 3. | "Always Was" | 3:20 |
| 4. | "Leave" | 3:43 |
| 5. | "Just Someone" | 3:45 |
| 6. | "Cross Your Heart" | 2:19 |
| 7. | "Half Dead" | 3:56 |
| 8. | "Never Had You" | 3:02 |
| 9. | "Forgive Me" | 4:12 |
| Total length: | | 30:29 |

=== Streetlamp Musician ===
Gelman's second album was released in 2013.

All tracks are written by Natalie Gelman and Charlie Midnight, except where noted.

| No. | Title | Length |
|---|---|---|
| 1. | "One More Thing" | 4:11 |
| 2. | "Long Stemmed Roses" | 4:05 |
| 3. | "Most the While" | 4:50 |
| 4. | "The Lion" | 3:03 |
| 5. | "Streetlamp Musician" (Natalie Gelman, Javier Colon, Griffin Hollis) | 3:21 |
| 6. | "Laugh So Hard You Cry" | 3:46 |
| Total length: | | 23:16 |

=== Moth to the Flame ===
Gelman's third album was released in 2021 Blue Élan Records.

All tracks are written by Natalie Gelman and Charlie Midnight, except where noted.

| No. | Title | Length |
|---|---|---|
| 1. | "Photograph" | 4:11 |
| 2. | "Stronger" | 3:25 |
| 3. | "Heavy Heavy Heart" | 3:27 |
| 4. | "The Answer" | 3:03 |
| 5. | "The Way Things Go" | 2:43 |
| 6. | "Better Days" | 2:56 |
| 7. | "Some People" | 3:27 |
| 8. | "Summer Song" | 4:17 |
| 9. | "Love Me Let Go" | 3:25 |
| 10. | "The Devil" | 3:16 |
| 11. | "I'd Do It Without You" | 3:00 |
| 12. | "Unloving You" | 4:14 |
| 13. | "Won't Matter Anymore" | 5:26 |
| Total length: | | 46:50 |
