= StarTomorrow =

StarTomorrow was an online-only musical talent search created by NBC and music executive Tommy Mottola produced by 25/7 Productions in association with CenterStaging and Rehearsals.Com.

== History ==
NBC announced that it would air StarTomorrow in February 2006. Mottola severed his relationship with the show in June 2006, and producer David Foster was brought in. The prize was subsequently changed from a recording contract with Mottola's Casablanca Records to a contract with Foster's label.

Hosted by Michele Merkin, StarTomorrow premiered on NBC and NBC.com on July 31, 2006, when a one-hour show about the auditions aired on NBC. In a format similar to American idol, 92 bands competed in weekly head-to-head competition, and bands that won were then given the chance to compete in the competition's second round.

The show finale was in November 2006 and was eventually won by award-winning artist, Cindy Alexander. However, the show's contract was so bad that none of the Top 5 (Cindy Alexander, Bob Gentry, Brooke Ramel, Hydra FX, Blake Cody) bands signed. NBC officially ceased production on March 26, 2007.

== Judges ==
- Travis Barker
- Mick Fleetwood
- David Foster
- Billy Gibbons
- Rob Tannenbaum

== Partial list of contestants ==
=== Round One ===
==== Week one winners ====
- Aruna
- Red Letter
- Tim Corley
- Far From Nowhere
- Marissa Ponticorvo
- Next Phase
- Jeff Coffey
- UNIQ
- Big Toe
- Mili Mili
- Tubby
- Juliet Echo

==== Week two winners ====
- Stella's Notch
- Mike Corrad
- Cedric Thomas
- Tubby
- Blake Cody
- Sharif
- Bob Gentry
- Another Found Self
- This is Danica
- Broken Pony
- Men in Black
- Shaley Scott
- Juliet Echo

==== Week three winners ====
- Tony B
- Blake Cody
- d Henry Fenton
- Nikko Gray
- Scarlet Crush
- The Blue Sky Traffic
- Melodee Lynn Holsinger
- Tubby
- Kings of Spain
- The Dre Allen Project
- HydraFX

==== Week four winners ====
- Malia Star
- Jonalee White
- Blake Cody
- David Reavis and Kenny Kallam
- Loose Chains
- Slapdash Graduate
- Dig Jelly
- Pete Hopkins
- Tubby
- Tasha Taylor and the Band

==== Week five winners ====
- Warren Beaumont
- Michelle Andria
- The Sexies
- Rob Perez
- Cindy Alexander
- Tubby
- Brooke Ramel
- Horny Toad
- Aria Johnson

==== Week six winners ====
- Big Toe
- Jonalee White
- Slapdash Graduate
- Pete Hopkins
- Tony B
- Red Letter
- Tubby
- The Blue Sky Traffic
- Marissa Ponticorvo

=== Other weeks ===
- Sheila E.
- Mick Jones
