= How Do I Look? =

- Genre: Reality
- Presented by: Finola Hughes; Jeannie Mai
- Country of origin: United States
- Original language: English
- No. of seasons: 12

Production
- Executive producer: Riaz Patel
- Running time: 60 minutes
- Production company: Left-Right Productions

Original release
- Network: Style
- Release: January 16, 2004 – January 23, 2012

How Do I Look? is a makeover show airing on the Style Network. The show was originally hosted by English soap opera veteran Finola Hughes; the latest season was hosted by celebrity stylist Jeannie Mai. The show features "fashion victims," purportedly turned in by their friends, coworkers, and family members. Although there are variations in each episode tailored to the individual contestant, every episode follows the same basic pattern.

== Overview ==
Each episode begins with a short montage introducing the subject of the makeover. Contestants typically are victims of a combination of poor fashion sense and lifestyle situations that exacerbate the problem. The makeover often coincides with a turning point in the person's life, such as starting college, changing careers, or losing weight. Two "accomplices" who are close to the contestant express concern over the negative effect of the contestant's appearance on their life. The accomplices express their view that the contestant's physical appearance is socially unacceptable and can only be repaired through the application of new clothes, new hair and new make-up. Accomplices openly express their contempt for the clothing and style choices the contestant has made heretofore. Accomplices may be family members (spouses, parents, children, siblings, etc.), friends, or coworkers.

These two people will be joined by a third accomplice, a professional stylist. Together the three go through the contestant's entire wardrobe, each choosing pieces to throw out. Accomplices will be realistic about the contestant's type of style and they will also criticize it.

The host (Finola from 2004 to 2008 & Jeannie from 2009 to 2012) and the contestant will then confront the accomplices who will then detail their reactions to the contestant's wardrobe. In the first season, accomplices were limited to only one item, but in subsequent seasons, they are shown removing multiple or many items. Contestants are often distressed and hurt as the accomplices throw out favorite items and critique the contestant's style, though some are more open to change than others. The hosts are often seen throwing clothes into a tube. The contestant has an opportunity to respond to the criticism and make requests regarding the makeover.

The contestant then has a one-on-one conversation with the host about the reasons behind their clothing choices, feelings about the critiques, and fears and expectations for the rest of the makeover. The segment ends with the host sending the accomplices to shop for clothing. Occasionally, the shopping period is paired with a special trip for the contestant that somehow reflects their needs. Such trips include spa visits, dancing lessons, and therapy sessions.

Each accomplice is given $1200 to spend on a collection of three outfits for the contestant. Two of the three outfits must fit set themes based on the contestant's lifestyle and needs and are generally given titles that are puns or clichéd phrases that play on these elements. For example, the episode featuring teacher Marlena McTigue included the outfit theme "Making the Grade." The final outfit in each collection is the "Wildcard," an outfit that the accomplice feels the contestant's wardrobe needs. In some episodes, collections must include an element of the contestant's original wardrobe, as in the episode featuring Karen Maruyama where the accomplices were required to incorporate a pair of shoes from Maruyama's existing collection. Each collection also includes a set of makeup and a new hairstyle. The contestant must choose one collection and accept it in its entirety.

The following day, the host and the contestant watch footage of each accomplice's shopping spree. The footage is intentionally deceptive, featuring no clothing that is included in the final collections. Accomplices will often home in on clothing in colors or styles for which the contestant has expressed specific distaste or clothing similar to that which they have just thrown out. The host and the contestant react accordingly.

During the next segment, the contestant is presented with each complete collection. The host introduces each outfit, and then the two react to it. At the end of each collection, the host presents the makeup and hair style chosen by the accomplice. The hair styles are described in terms of a celebrity with a similar style.

The presentation segment is followed by a fashion shoot where the contestant tries on each outfit, comments on the clothing, and then makes a guess as to which accomplice put together each collection. Beginning with the third season, the accomplices watch footage of the fashion shoot behind a one-way mirror, and we see them react to the victim's comments about the clothing they try on. After the segment, the one-way mirror turns off, and accomplices surprise the contestant.

After the fashion shoot, the contestant chooses a collection. They are taken to a salon for the matching hair and makeup. The salon scenes are in typical makeover show fashion, with the contestant's face only shown in close-ups in order to keep the contestant's decision and final look a surprise until the end. Occasionally, final close-ups show enough of the hair or makeup to ruin the surprise, particularly in episodes where each accomplice has chosen a distinct hair style to match their collection.

The final segment begins with the host meeting again with the three accomplices. They each discuss their shopping decisions for a final time. They are joined by a small audience of additional family members and friends of the contestant. The contestant then enters the room on a catwalk, asking, "how do I look?" They are asked to make a final guess on who created the collection they chose.

Contestants are often given an additional prize. Sometimes these prizes are part of an ultimatum where the contestant must choose between a mystery reward and a beloved piece of clothing, at other times they are dependent on the contestant correctly guessing the creator of the chosen collection. Often, however, the bonus prizes involve no extra criteria. A typical prize is a $1000 gift certificate for a new wardrobe, but prizes are sometimes more tailored to the contestant. For example, a contestant known for hiding behind glasses may receive a year's worth of contact lenses.

Commercial breaks are often trailed with segments featuring quick fashion tips directed at the viewer. These tips are often solutions to common fashion faux pas and are presented either by the host or that episode's featured stylist.

Grammy nominated rapper Yo-Yo on How Do I Look?. Award-winning Recording Artist Aria (singer) Johnson (along with mom) make over sister Jena Johnson in 2010 episode of How Do I Look?

Anya Singleton and Michael Aarons wrote the new and currently airing theme song, "Look How I Shine" for the show. Anya Singleton sings the theme song.

Emmy Award-winning host Phil Moore, former Host of Nickelodeon's Nick Arcade is the writer for the show.

== Different versions ==
How Do I Look? Asia premiered on Asia's leading entertainment channel for women, Diva (Asia TV channel).

How Do I Look? South Africa premiered on E! Africa (DStv Channel 124) in 2017.
