= No Time for Love Songs =

Studio album by The Mastersons
- Released: March 6, 2020
- Studio: Sunset Sound Recorders
- Length: 40:42
- Label: New West
- Producer: Shooter Jennings

The Mastersons chronology
| Good Luck Charm (2014) | No Time for Love Songs (2020) |

Professional ratings
Aggregate scores
| Source | Rating |
|---|---|
| Metacritic | 79/100 |
Review scores
| Source | Rating |
| AllMusic | 4/5 stars |
| American Songwriter | 3.5/5 stars |

No Time for Love Songs is the fourth studio album by American alternative country duo The Mastersons. It was released on March 6, 2020 under New West.

== Critical reception ==
No Time for Love Songs was met with generally favorable reviews from critics. At Metacritic, which assigns a weighted average rating out of 100 to reviews from mainstream publications, this release received an average score of 79, based on 4 reviews.

== Track listing ==
All tracks are written by The Mastersons.

No Time for Love Songs track listing
| No. | Title | Length |
|---|---|---|
| 1. | "No Time for Love Songs" | 3:35 |
| 2. | "Spellbound" | 4:26 |
| 3. | "Circle the Sun" | 3:57 |
| 4. | "Eyes Open Wide" | 3:43 |
| 5. | "The Last Laugh" | 4:43 |
| 6. | "So Impossible" | 3:57 |
| 7. | "The Silver Line" | 4:18 |
| 8. | "There Is a Song to Sing" | 4:00 |
| 9. | "King of the Castle" | 4:05 |
| 10. | "Pride of the Wicked" | 3:58 |
