= Cory Branan =

American singer-songwriter

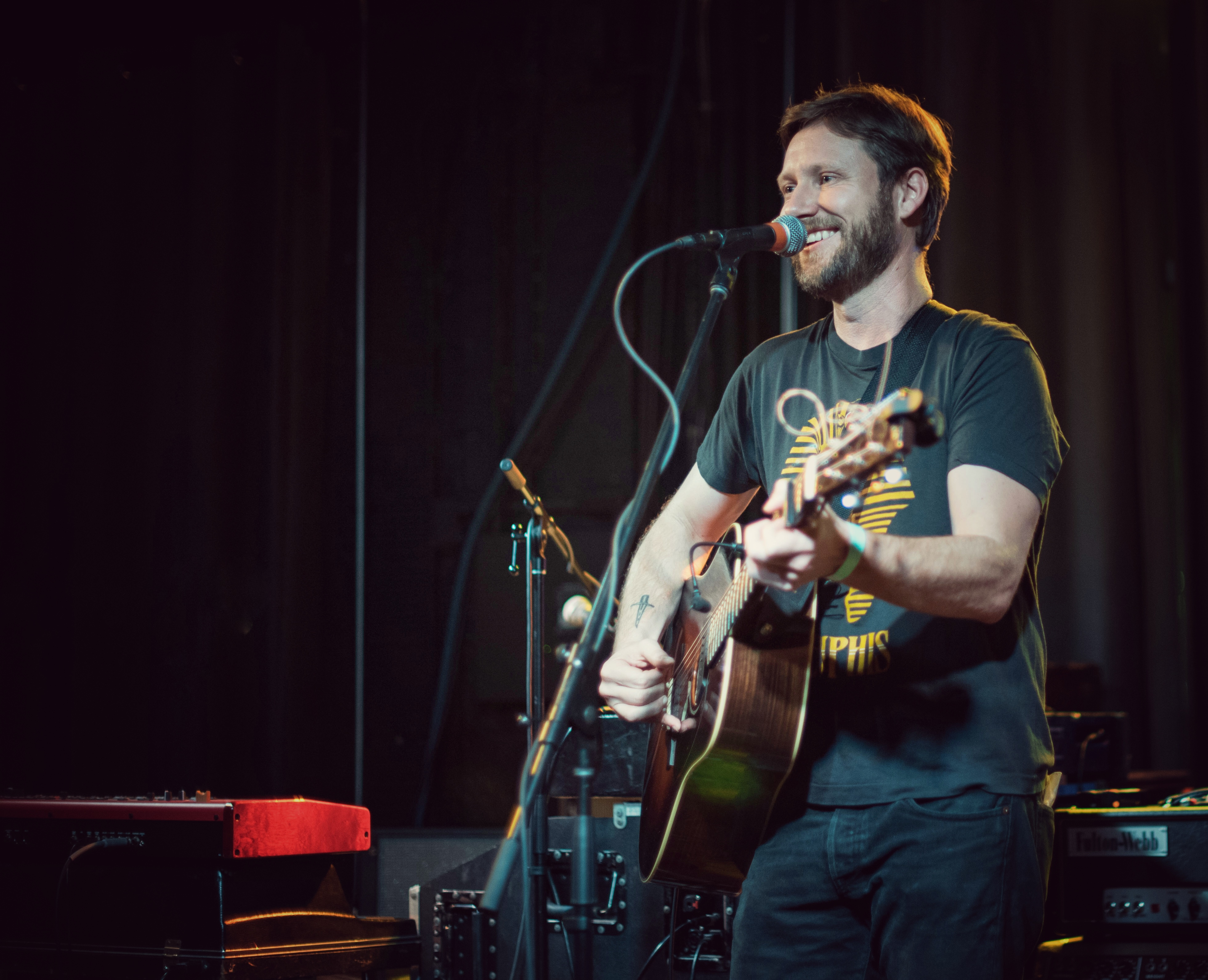
- Cory Branan at Gypsy Sally's (Washington, DC) October 2015

Background information
- Born: Cory Dale Branan; December 15, 1974 (age 51); Memphis, Tennessee, U.S.
- Origin: Southaven, Mississippi, U.S.
- Genres: Alternative country Rock; Folk
- Instruments: Vocals; Guitar
- Years active: 2000–present
- Labels: Blue Élan Records; Bloodshot Records; Madjack
- Website: corybranan.com

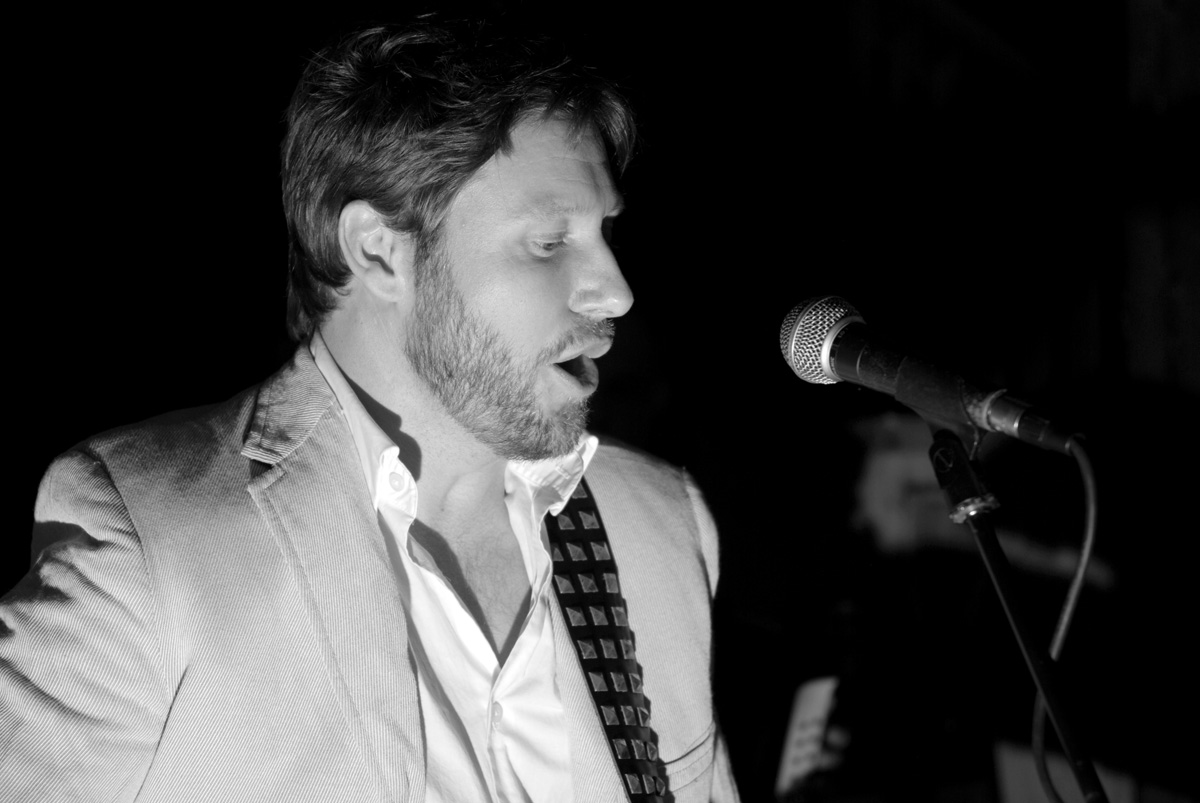
Branan at The Whitewater Tavern (Little Rock, AR) New Year's Eve 2010

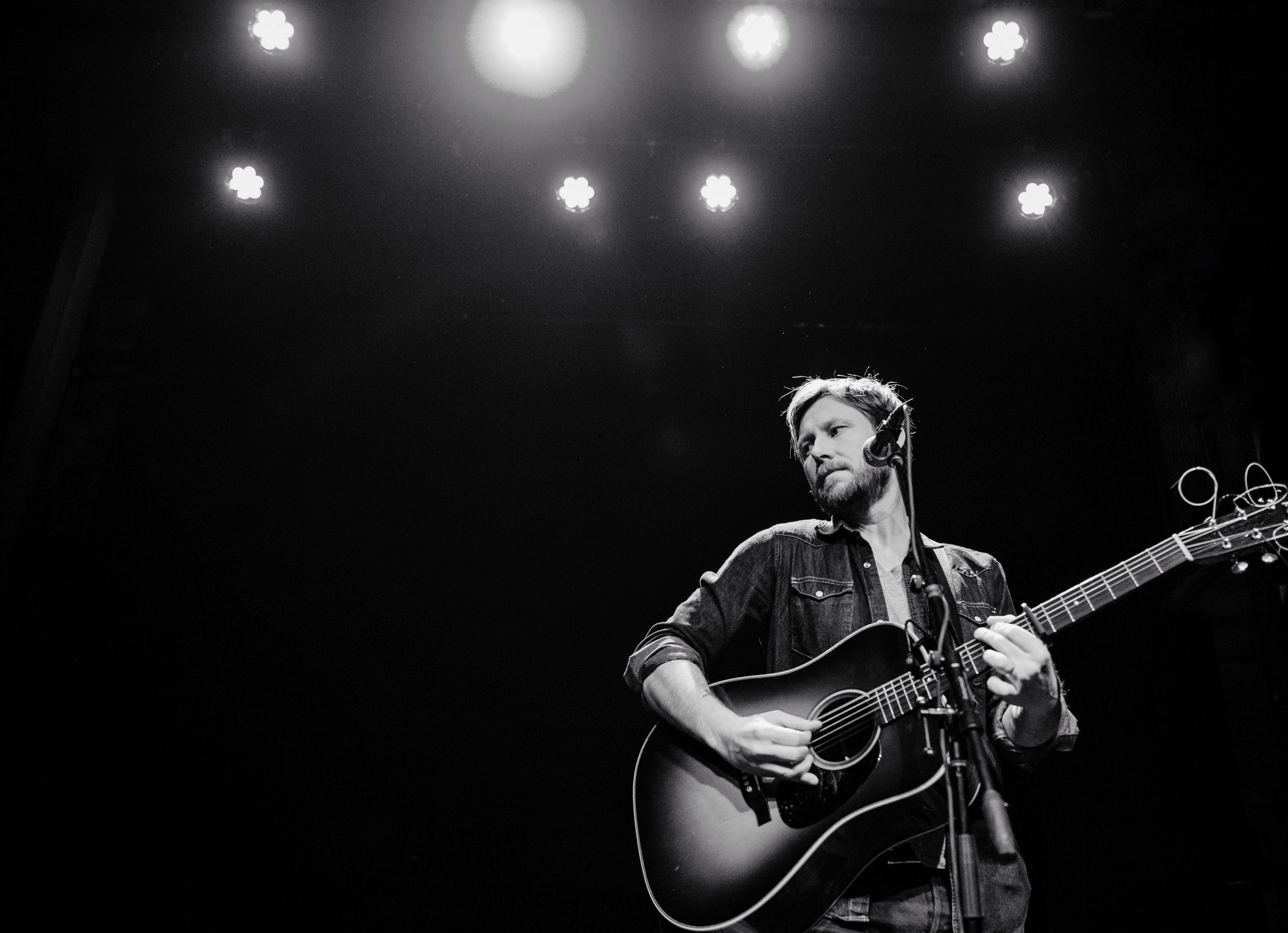
Branan at Rough Trade (Brooklyn, NY) February 2016

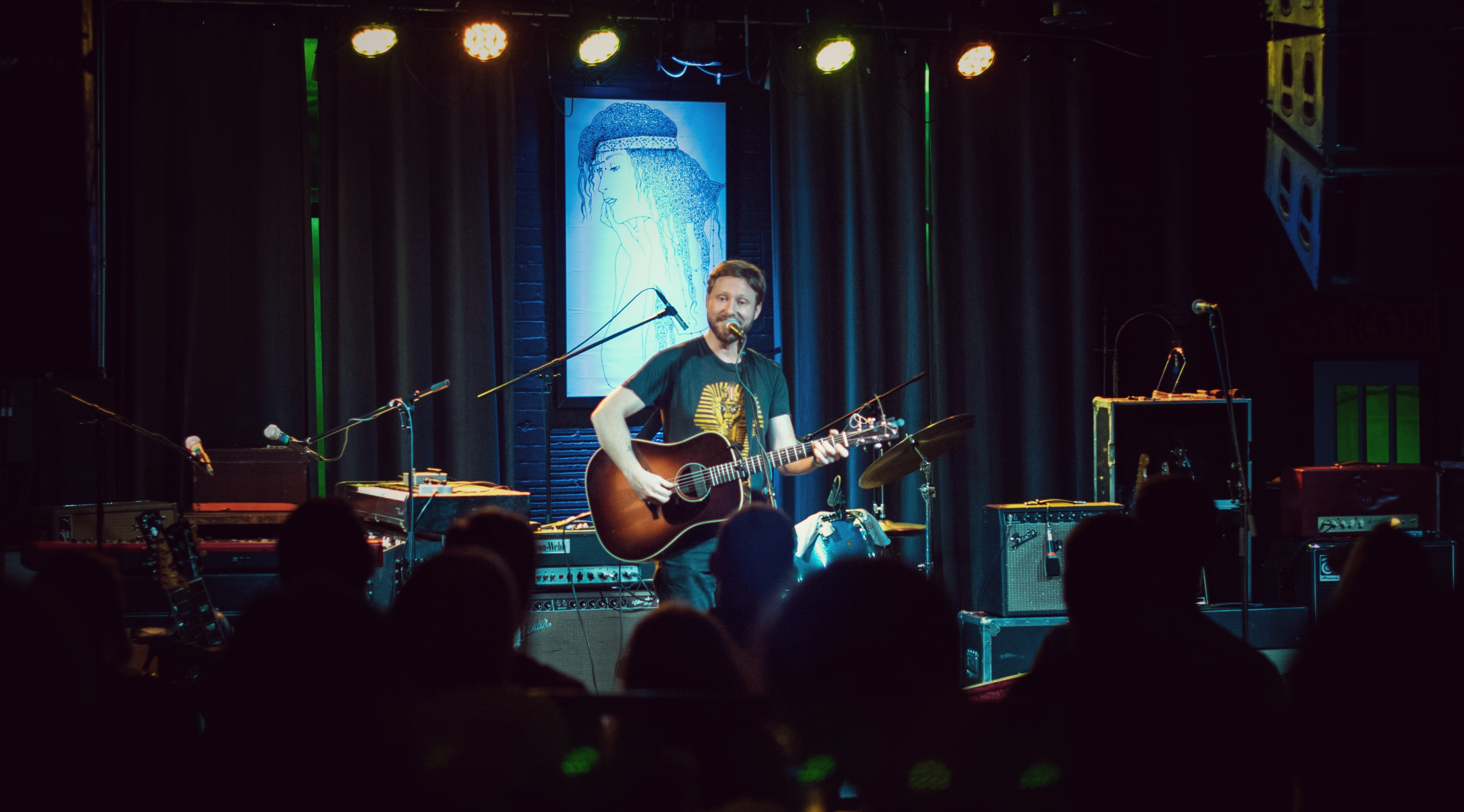
Branan at Gypsy Sally's (Washington, DC) October 2015

Cory Dale Branan (born December 15, 1974) is an American singer-songwriter from Mississippi.

== Early life ==
Branan was born in Memphis, Tennessee, to parents Dallas Lee Branan, a jet mechanic at FedEx, and Peggy Branan (née Rhodes). He grew up in Southaven, Mississippi, in the northwest corner of Mississippi, the third largest city in Mississippi and a suburb of Memphis. His family comes from Arkabutla, Mississippi. He grew up with musical influences from church, gospel music his dad listened to, and his family: his father played the drums, his grandfather played guitar and his great-grandfather played the violin.

Branan learned how to play the guitar young, and by his teens, Branan was playing guitar in diverse genres from hard rock, black metal (Black Like Me), to heavy metal in local bands, eventually fronting a Black Sabbath cover band as well as playing country music. He credits a creative writing teacher in high school, Evelyn Simms, for suggesting books outside the usual high school curriculum and encouraging his writing.

Branan attended Delta State University in Cleveland, Mississippi, community college, as well as University of Memphis.

== Career ==
After high school Branan moved to Memphis, where, among other jobs, he worked as a bartender at the Peabody Hotel.

In his early 20s he began to explore the music of singer-songwriter John Prine, which led to Branan writing his own songs, which he began performing at open mic nights at Memphis' Daily Planet.

=== The Hell You Say ===
Although initially self-released in 2001, Branan re-released his debut full-length album, The Hell You Say, on MADJACK Records on October 8, 2002. The rejuvenated album replaced three songs from the original issue with newbies "Skateland South" and "American Dream", in an effort to streamline the concept of the album. Branan produced the record with Kevin Cubbins, guitarist of the band Pawtuckets, who also contributed to the record. It was recorded in Memphis at Memphis Soundworks and Humongous Studios. Lucero and the River Bluff Clan also appear.

In 2003, Branan made his TV network debut playing the song, "Miss Ferguson" on The David Letterman Show.

=== 12 Songs ===
In 2006, Branan released his sophomore effort, 12 Songs on March 21, 2006, on MADJACK Records. Almost all of 12 Songs were written around the same time as his debut full-length, but were saved for record number two.

The title of the album comes from Branan's concept for the record as more of a collection of 12 songs rather than a cohesive album. Jody Steven from Big Star played drums on the record. "Sweet Janine" is a song loosely based on and inspired by the death of his best friend in elementary school who drowned from an asthma attack at a pool party. Branan said that he wrote both of his first two records while sitting in the bustling food court of the Oak Court Mall in Memphis.

=== Mutt ===
In 2011, Branan signed with Bloodshot Records. Six years after his prior record, he released Mutt on May 22, 2012. American Songwriter praised his "hushed, dry whiskey voice and his sharp edged, story song lyrics [which] make the appropriately titled Mutt a mongrel that rewards repeated spins with an understanding of Branan’s many influences and an appreciation for his largely impressionistic, thought-provoking words." The title Mutt actually comes from his most frequent answer when asked to describe his own music. Originally intended to be titled Midtown – in reference to the diverse neighborhood in Memphis – Branan said that the theme of each song on the record reminds him of the poem The Oven Bird by Robert Frost "which paints a picture of the fallen petals of post-spring flowers to convey fleeting beauty and ends with the question, 'What to make of a diminished thing.'" The record received positive reviews.

The album was also notable for its album cover. The photograph by Joshua Black Wilkins features a topless woman wearing a painted papier-mâché mask Branan created, which Branan said he dreamed, that she represents a muse. In discussing the cover, Branan described her being like a "Mississippi Madonna with a boom box, kind of like a folk art thing."

=== The No-Hit Wonder ===
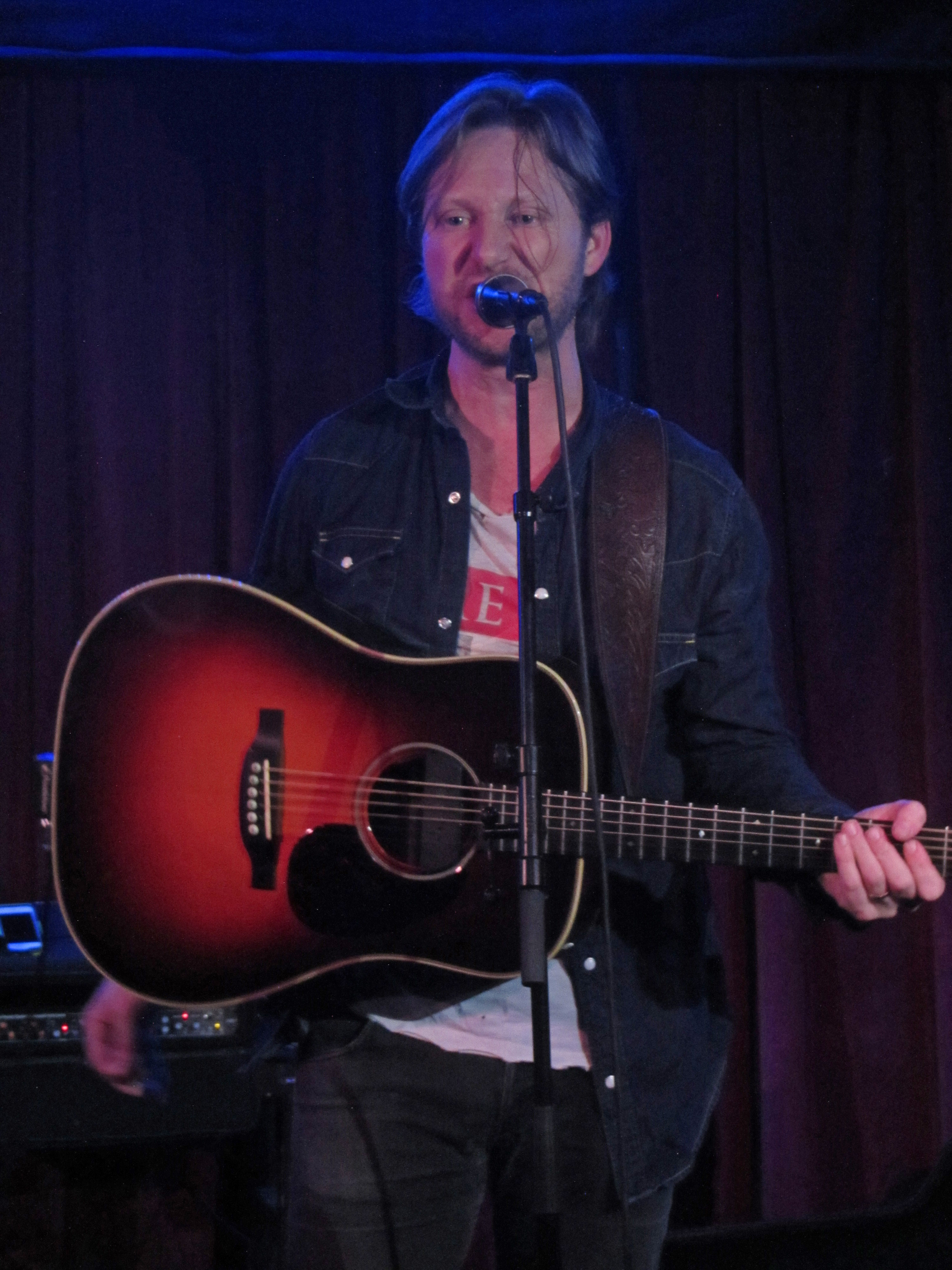
Branan performing in 2015

In 2014, Branan released The No-Hit Wonder on Bloodshot Records on August 19, 2014. The album, produced by Paul Ebersold and recorded over the period of three days in Nashville at The Sound Kitchen, features contributions by Craig Finn and Steve Selvidge of The Hold Steady, Tim Easton, Caitlin Rose, Austin Lucas, and Jason Isbell. "Slick" Joe Fick from The Dempseys plays upright bass on the song "Sour Mash" – a song about a dry county where a whiskey company makes its liquor – and Audley Freed also appears. Sadler Vaden (Drivin N Cryin, Jason Isbell) is on electric guitar and John Radford on play drums on the record.

The record was listed by Rolling Stone magazine as one of the top 40 country records of 2014. Branan said that the passing of family members as well as his growing family changed his approach to songwriting. "You Make Me," which Isbell sings on, is a song about his wife, and "All I Got And Gone" is about the passing of his father. Drummer John Radford (the Dynamites) and pedal steel guitar player Robby Turner play on the track "No Hit Wonder."

=== Adios ===
Branan released his fifth album, Adios, on April 7, 2017. Advertised as "Cory Branan’s death record", the record features Robbie Crowell of Deer Tick on drums and percussion, keys, and horns; and James Haggerty on bass. Guest musicians include Amanda Shires on fiddle and vocals, plus backing vocals on I Only Know by Laura Jane Grace and Dave Hause.

Pitchfork described the album as "possibly his best album to date — it’s certainly his most musically imaginative and arguably his wisest", but also criticised its length; "At 14 tracks, it meanders, occasionally lags, and indulges far too many tangents and jarring transitions". Rolling Stone listed it as the 27th Best Country and Americana Album of 2017.

In 2021, Blue Élan Records announced they had signed Branan to their label, with a new album expected to be released early 2022.

=== When I Go I Ghost ===
Branan released his sixth album, When I Go I Ghost, on October 14, 2022. It was recorded and produced in Nashville by Grammy award-winning engineer, Jeremy Ferguson. The first single, That Look I Lost features vocals from Jason Isbell. Other contributing artists on the album include Brian Fallon and Garrison Starr. This was his first release with Blue Élan Records.

== Critical reception ==
In 2000, the Memphis chapter of The Recording Academy (formerly known as the National Academy of Recording Arts and Sciences (NARAS)) gave Branan the Phillips Award for Newcomer of the Year. At that time he didn't even have a recording contract yet.

In the fall of 2014, Branan was listed in Rolling Stone magazine's list of 10 New Artists You Need to Know.

== Collaborations ==
In April 2015, Branan was part of a Record Store Day release with label-mate, Lydia Loveless. The two artists cover two Prince songs: Loveless doing I Would Die 4 U and Branan doing Under The Cherry Moon. The 7" limited edition releases was pressed onto purple vinyl.

== Personal life ==
Branan lives in Memphis, Tennessee, with his wife and son. Branan and his wife were married at the Shack Up Inn in Clarksdale, Mississippi. Branan also has a daughter from a previous relationship who lives in Tulsa.

== Discography ==
Albums

- 2002: The Hell You Say (Madjack Records)
- 2006: 12 Songs (Madjack Records)
- 2012: Mutt (Bloodshot Records)
- 2014: The No-Hit Wonder (Bloodshot Records)
- 2017: "Adios" (Bloodshot Records)
- 2022: “When I Go I Ghost” (Blue Elan Records)

EPs

- 2009: Jon Snodgrass / Cory Branan (Suburban Home)

Singles

- 2014: Under the Cherry Moon: "I Would Die 4 U" by Lydia Loveless / "Under The Cherry Moon" by Cory Branan (Bloodshot Records)
