= Yossi Dina =

Israeli pawnbroker, businessman, entrepreneur and reality TV personality

- יוסי דינה
- Born: August 21, 1954 (age 71); Israel
- Occupations: Founder, owner and CEO, the Dina Collection
- Known for: Pawn broker, reality television star and socialite

Yossi Dina (Hebrew: יוסי דינה; born August 21, 1954) is an Israeli pawnbroker, businessman, entrepreneur, and reality television personality.

== Biography ==
Yossi Dina, the entrepreneur and TV personality, was born in Israel on August 21, 1954. He spent time on a kibbutz, a communal settlement, and then served in the Israel army. In 1981, at the age of 27, Dina arrived in the United States. After a brief stint in New York, he hitched a ride to Los Angeles and found his niche in the jewelry business selling diamonds door-to-door. Soon he began to extend loans to people who needed money but were reluctant to sell off their beloved items. Eventually Dina saved enough money to open his own shop and went into business as South Beverly Wilshire Jewelry and Loan.

He became known as the "jeweler and pawnbroker to the rich and famous" and transitioned from his small store into a large gallery-style boutique called The Dina Collection in Beverly Hills. Dina has done business with many celebrities, including Lenny Dykstra, Larry King, and many others.

Dina's shop, the subject of the reality series Beverly Hills Pawn on the Reelz Channel, sells millions of dollars' worth of paintings, sculptures, jewelry, watches, first editions, cars, and memorabilia.

Dina resides full-time in Beverly Hills near his Dina Collection shop, and also owns a multi-million dollar beach home in Malibu, once owned by entertainer Al Jolson.
