= Beverly Hills Pawn =

- Genre: Reality Television
- Created by: Asylum Entertainment
- Country of origin: United States
- Original language: English
- No. of seasons: 4
- No. of episodes: 61

Production
- Production location: Beverly Hills

Original release
- Network: Reelz
- Release: June 5, 2013 – March 28, 2015

Beverly Hills Pawn is an American TV show filmed in Beverly Hills, California.

== Description ==
It is filmed in The Dina Collection pawn shop owned by Yossi Dina who appears on the show along with his employees Aria, Cory, and manager Dominique.

== Location ==
The Dina Collection is a high-end pawn shop catering to upper class clients in Beverly Hills. Along with handling jewelry, The Dina Collection also deals in Hollywood memorabilia. The show is frequented by mostly less famous celebrities.
