= Love Wins Again =

Studio album by Janiva Magness
- Released: 2016
- Genre: Blues
- Label: Blue Elan

Janiva Magness chronology
Original (2014)	Love Wins Again (2016)

Love Wins Again is an album by Janiva Magness. It earned Magness a Grammy Award nomination for Best Contemporary Blues Album.

== Track listing ==
No.	Title	Length
1.	"Love Wins Again"	3:18
2.	"Real Slow"	3:51
3.	"When You Hold Me"	3:57
4.	"Say You Will"	3:50
5.	"Doorway"	3:57
6.	"Moth to a Flame"	4:44
7.	"Your House is Burnin'"	3:57
8.	"Just Another Lesson"	3:08
9.	"Rain Down"	4:01
10.	"Long as I Can See the Light"	3:17
11.	"Who Will Come for Me"	4:38
