= Drivin' Nails in My Coffin =

Single by Floyd Tillman
- Released: 1946
- Genre: Country
- Length: 2:38
- Label: Columbia
- Songwriter: Jerry Irby

"Drivin' Nails in My Coffin" is a country music song written by Jerry Irby. It is a breakup song, telling of a man who has been drinking booze, "driving nails in my coffin over you."

The song was originally recorded and released in 1945 by Jerry Irby. It became a hit in 1946 for both Floyd Tillman and Ernest Tubb. The Tillman record was released on the Columbia label (catalog no. 36998), peaked at No. 2 on Billboard's folk chart in August 1946, and was ranked as the No. 16 record in Billboard's year-end folk juke box chart. Tubb's version was issued on the Decca label (catalog no. 73679) and peaked at No. 5 on the folk chart in December 1946.

The song was later covered by many artists, including Beck and Willie Nelson (duet), Hank Thompson, the Osborne Brothers, the Wilburn Brothers, Ramblin' Jack Elliott, Asleep at the Wheel, Rhonda Vincent, Mike Auldridge, Charley Crockett, Boxcar Willie, Mac Wiseman, Johnny Bush, and Charlie Walker.

== See also ==
- Billboard Most-Played Folk Records of 1946
