= The Mastersons =

American musical duo

- Origin: Brooklyn, New York, United States
- Genres: Alternative country, Americana
- Years active: 2012–present
- Label: New West
- Members: Chris Masterson; Eleanor Whitmore
- Website: www.themastersonsmusic.com

The Mastersons, husband and wife Chris Masterson and Eleanor Whitmore, is an American alternative country duo from Brooklyn, New York.

== Career ==
=== History ===
Masterson and Whitmore, both Texas born, enjoyed successful careers as supporting musicians. Masterson toured with Son Volt, and Whitmore played fiddle for Kelly Willis. They met at a 2006 Steamboat Springs music festival, and married each other in 2009.

Masterson assisted on Whitmore's solo record in 2009, and Whitmore provided harmony vocals and violin on Masterson's EP. In 2011 the duo joined Steve Earle's touring band, The Dukes and Duchesses.

=== Releases ===
In 2012, the duo christened themselves "The Mastersons" and recorded their debut record, Birds Fly South which collected songs they'd written independently of each other. Supporting musicians include Mike Hardwick (pedal steel), Sweney Tidball (keyboards), George Reiff (bass), and Falcon Valdez (drums).

The songs on 2014's Good Luck Charm were all co-written by the duo. The album was produced by Jim Scott (Tom Petty), and they were joined by John Ginty (keyboards) and Mark Stepro (drums).

On their third record Transient Lullaby, released in 2017, the title track reflects their constant touring, and the numerous cities they have lived in.

=== Personal life ===
Whitmore's sister is singer/songwriter/bassist Bonnie Whitmore, and the Mastersons have provided musical support on Bonnie's recordings.

Whitmore's mother is an opera singer, and her father is a folk singer. Eleanor is also an accomplished pilot.

== Discography ==
=== The Mastersons ===
Albums

- 2012: Birds Fly South (New West)
- 2014: Good Luck Charm (New West)
- 2017: Transient Lullaby (New West)
- 2020: No Time for Love Songs (New West)

Singles

- 2012: "One Word More" (New West)
- 2014: "Closer to You" (New West)

=== Eleanor Whitmore ===
- 2008: Airplanes (self-released Bandcamp)

=== Chris Masterson ===
- 2008: The Late Great Chris Masterson (self-released)

=== The Whitmore Sisters ===
- 2022: Ghost Stories (self-released Bandcamp)
