= Management of domestic violence =

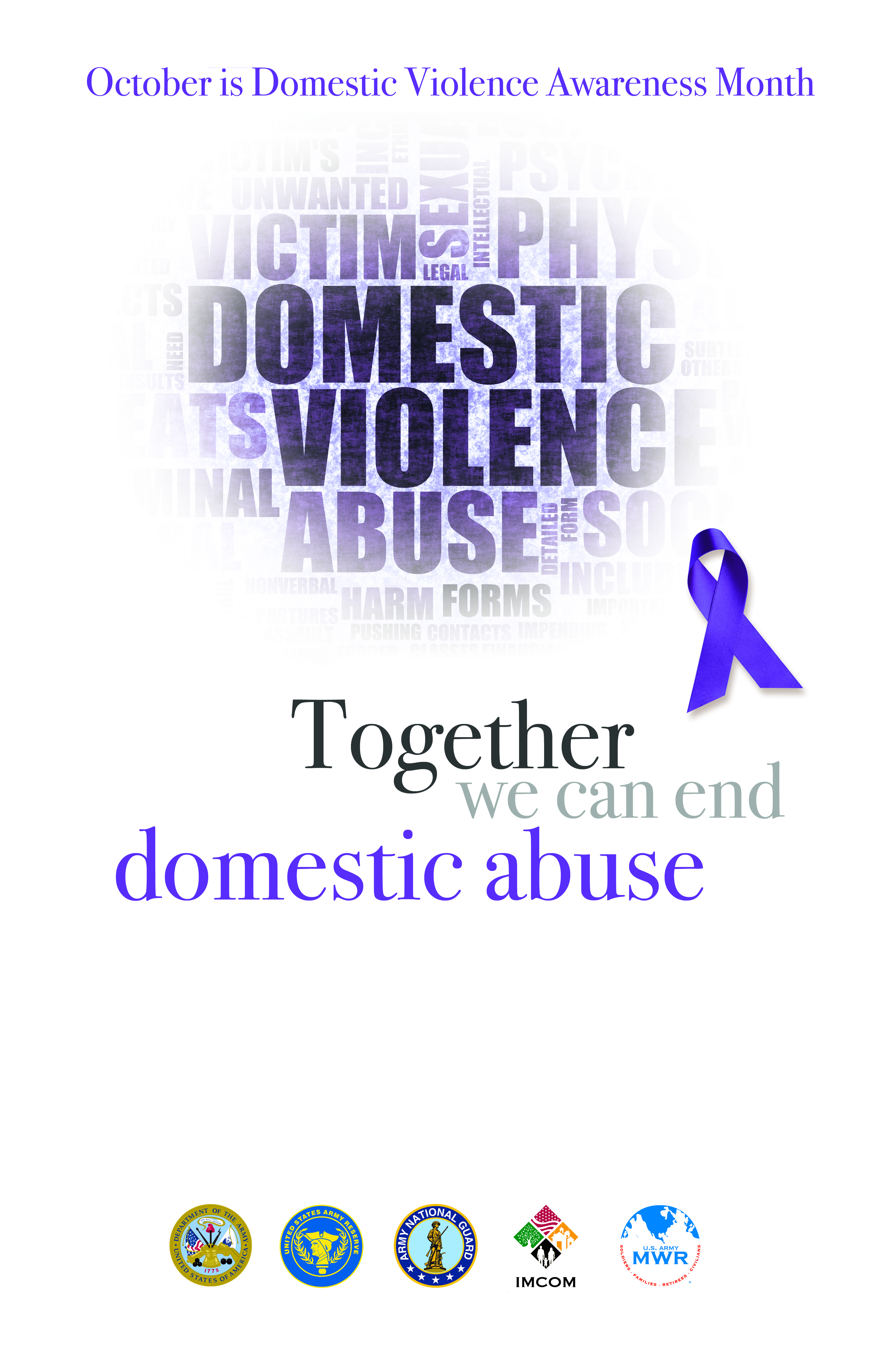
October is observed as domestic abuse month in the United States. This poster was issued by various branches of the United States Military to educate and prevent domestic abuse.

The management of domestic violence deals with the treatment of victims of domestic violence and preventing repetitions of such violence. The response to domestic violence in Western countries is typically a combined effort between law enforcement, social services, and health care. The role of each has evolved as domestic violence has been brought more into public view.

Historically, domestic violence has been viewed as a private family matter that need not involve the government or criminal justice. Police officers were often reluctant to intervene by making an arrest, and often chose instead to simply counsel the couple and/or ask one of the parties to leave the residence for a period of time. The courts were reluctant to impose any significant sanctions on those convicted of domestic violence, largely because it was viewed as a misdemeanor offense.

The modern view in industrialized countries is that domestic violence should be viewed as a public matter and that all criminal authorities should be involved; once the violence is reported, it should be taken seriously. Further, support needs to be put in place to restore the victim's safety and respect, which often includes the efforts of the person who caused the harm.

== Medical response ==
Medical professionals can make a difference in the lives of those who experience abuse. Many cases of spousal abuse are handled solely by physicians and do not involve the police. Sometimes cases of domestic violence are brought into the emergency room, while many other cases are handled by a family physician or other primary care provider. Subspecialist physicians are also increasingly playing an important role. For example, HIV physicians are ideally suited to play an important role in managing abuse given the association between abuse and HIV infection as well as their often lifelong relationships with patients.

Medical professionals are in a position to give advice and refer victims to appropriate services; however, health care professionals have not always met this role, with uneven quality of care and, in some cases, misunderstandings about domestic violence.

Carole Washaw suggests that many doctors prefer not to get involved in people's "private" lives. Jenny Clifton, John Jacobs, Jo Tulloch found that training for general practitioners in the United States about domestic violence was very limited or they had no training. Abbott and Williamson found that knowledge and understanding of domestic violence was very limited among health care professionals in a Midlands, United Kingdom county, and that they do not see themselves as being able to play a major role in helping women in regards to domestic violence. Furthermore, in the biomedical model of health care, injuries are often just treated and diagnosed, without regard for the causes. As well, there is substantial reluctance for victims to come forward and broach the issue with their physicians. On average, women experience 35 incidents of domestic violence before seeking treatment.

In the U.S., the Institute of Medicine recognized the shortcomings of the health care system in its 2002 report entitled Confronting Chronic Neglect and attributed some of the problems cited to a lack of adequate training among health professionals. In the U.S., the Institute of Medicine recognized the shortcomings of the health care system in its 2002 report entitled Confronting Chronic Neglect and attributed some of the problems cited to a lack of adequate training among health professionals.

Health professionals have an ethical responsibility to recognize and address exposure to abuse in their patients, in the health care setting. For example, the American Medical Association's code of medical ethics states that "Due to the prevalence and medical consequences of family violence, physicians should routinely inquire about physical, sexual, and psychological abuse as part of the medical history. Physicians must also consider abuse in the differential diagnosis for a number of medical complaints, particularly when treating women."

== Law enforcement ==
Legislation on domestic violence

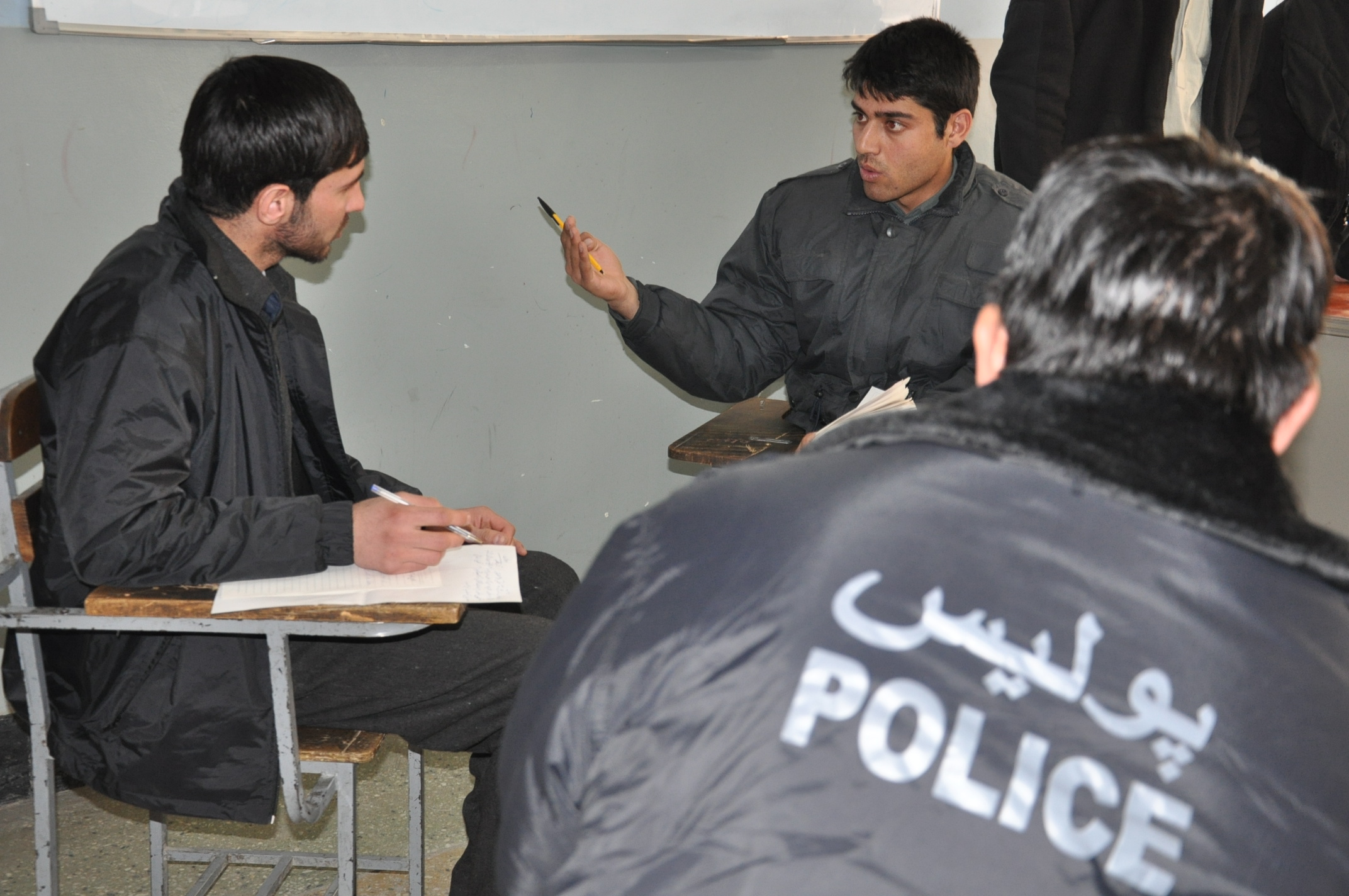
Afghan National Police instructors conduct a role playing scenario dealing with sexual abuse at the Afghan National Police Academy, Kabul, Afghanistan on December 30, 2010. Dr. Anna Baldry taught the Train the Trainer Gender Seminar to give ANP instructors more comprehensive and effective delivery methods for the current curriculum on domestic violence and sexual abuse. (U.S. Navy photo by Chief Petty Officer Brian Brannon/Released)

In the 1970s, studies in Europe and North America showed that domestic violence was widespread in many homes, resulting in emotional and physical trauma, and sometimes death. Into the 21st century many countries have taken steps to eradicate domestic violence, such as criminalization of violence against women and other abuses. Organizations have been formed which provide assistance and protection of domestic abuse victims, laws and criminal remedies, and domestic violence courts. (Note: For instance, in Spain, the 2004 "The Organic Act on Integrated Protection Measures against Gender Violence" established Courts of "Violence against Women." Spanish Courts may allow to hear the case behind closed doors and that proceedings should not be made public, order a person accused of gender violence to leave the abode he shared with his victim, suspend the alleged perpetrator of acts of gender violence from exercising parental authority, custody or guardianship with regard to the minors he or she specifies, and may order the suspension of the right to possess weapons. It was announced on April 13, 2011 that all homicides resulting from domestic abuse in England and Wales will be subject to a multi-agency review involving the police and health services, local authorities, probation, voluntary groups and any other bodies connected to a victim.) In addition, social, legal, psychological, and medical services have been made available for victims of domestic violence.

Although acts of domestic violence are criminal and a violation of human rights, safety and dignity, as of 2010 the United Nation has found that it is still often considered a private matter. Some countries with laws against domestic violence may not enforce them and there are many countries that do not criminalize domestic violence. The United Nations published Handbook on Effective Responses to Violence against Women for police and other first responders to provide guidelines for police intervention.

Where there are laws against domestic violence, such abuse is often under-reported. The reasons for not reporting may include that the victim does not want to end the relationship, report the violence or pursue legal remedies include:

- Fear
  - for their safety or their children's safety
  - that they may lose custody of their children
  - inability to support themselves and their children
  - of deportation, if an immigrant
- External pressure
  - family members or their religious or cultural community
  - due to rationalization of abuse by authorities
- Loyalty or emotional attachment to the abuser
- Self-blame or low self-esteem
- Isolated or without a support system
- Lack of legal information about victims' rights

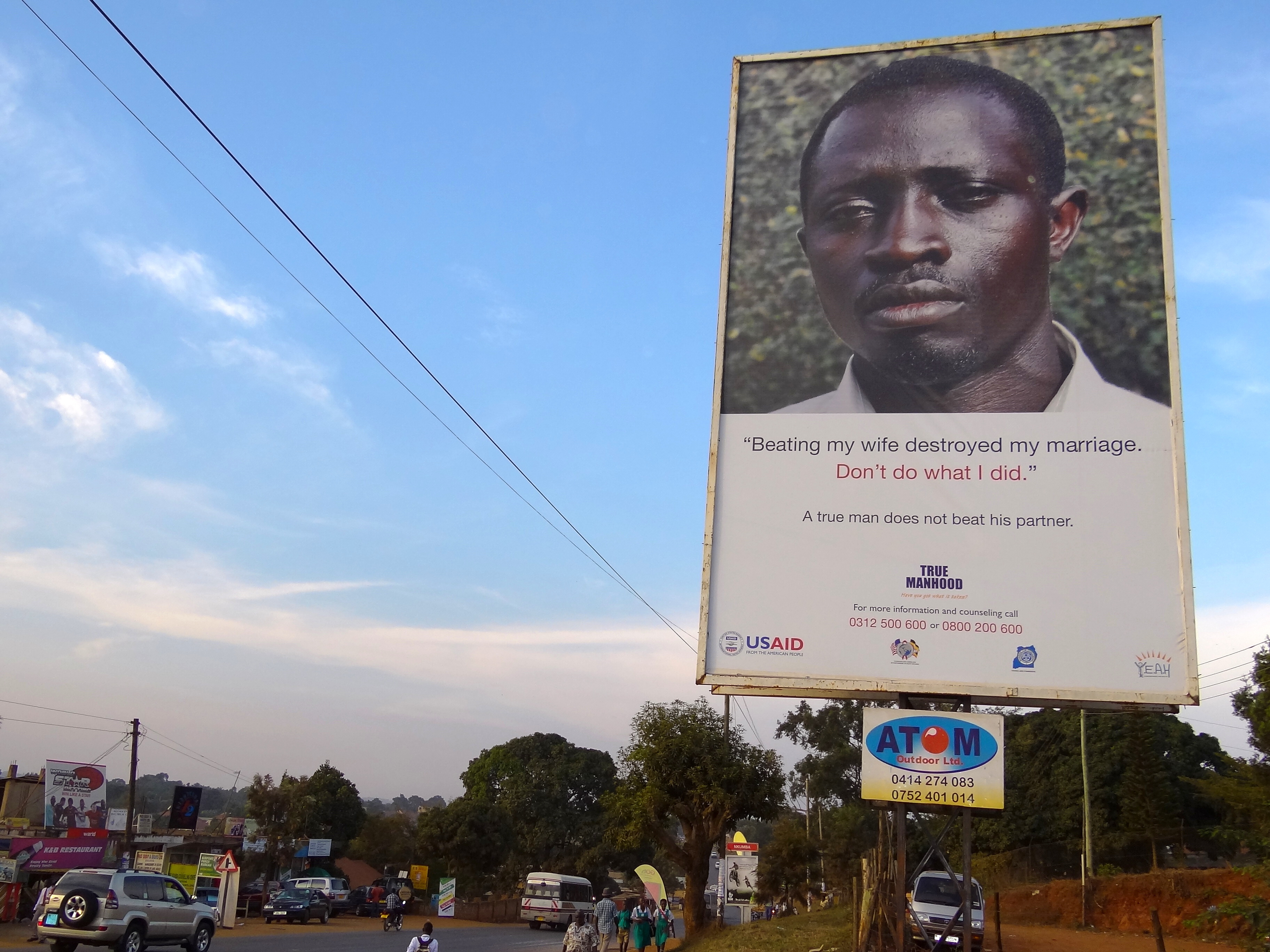
True Manhood - Anti-Domestic Violence Sign outside Entebbe, Uganda. "Beating my wife destroyed my marriage: Don't do what I did. A true man does not beat his partner."

Of the cases that are reported, they are often under-prosecuted. Criminologists suggest that abusers who are employed and have ties to the community may initially fear punishment, though many cases do not make it all the way through the criminal justice process. If the victim is uncooperative during investigation, the prosecutor may choose not to pursue the case. If the case is pursued through the criminal justice system, sometimes the resulting sentence is minor. Subsequently, any fear that the abuser has of punishment may have diminished.

According to the United Nations' Handbook on effective police responses to violence against women: "Without clearly targeted efforts to alter institutional culture and practices and to mainstream the issue of gender in legislation and practice, most legal and political reforms have little positive impact." An effective system requires "cooperative, coordinated and effective involvement" of law enforcement, communities, non-governmental organizations (NGOs), courts, and prisons. Way to manage violence against women is to increase the number of female officers in the police force and to offer training programs for officers. Other ways to prevent and manage domestic include the development and implementation of the following law enforcement practices:

- Code of Conduct for law enforcement
- Police agency guiding policies
- Training programs, including sensitivity training for domestic violence and gender-neutral application of the laws
- Investigation protocols, including always responding to alleged acts of domestic violence, applying applicable legal remedies, and prosecute criminal acts
- Threat assessment and risk management
- Victim services and witness protection
- Programs to respond to offenders
- Privacy and confidentiality procedures
- Police accountability and oversight practices

Community programs include the development of shelters for abuse survivors, programs to create a culture that does not condone domestic violence, creation of prevention and victim services programs, and the development of educational programs for the religious and cultural communities.

== Counseling ==
=== Counseling for victim ===
Due to the extent and prevalence of violence in relationships, counselors and therapists are encouraged to assess every client for domestic violence (both experienced and perpetrated). If the clinician is seeing a couple for couple's counseling, this assessment should be conducted with each individual privately during the initial interview, in order to increase the victim's sense of safety in disclosing any violence in the relationship. In addition to determining whether violence is present, counselors and therapists should also make the distinction between situations where battering may have been a single, isolated incident or an ongoing pattern of control. The therapist must, however, consider that violence may be present even when there has been only a single physical incident as emotional/verbal, economic, and sexual abuse may be more insidious.

Another important issue in assessing clients for domestic violence lies in differing definitions of abuse – the therapist's definition may differ from that of the client, and paying close attention to the way the client describes their experiences is crucial in developing effective treatment plans. The therapist must determine if it is in the best interest of the client to explain that some behaviors (such as emotional abuse) are considered domestic violence, even if the client did not previously consider them as such.

If it becomes apparent to the therapist that domestic violence is taking place in a client's relationship, there are several statements the clinician can make that have been shown to be effective in rapport-building and immediate crisis intervention with clients. Firstly, it is essential that the therapist believe the victim's story and validate their feelings. It is recommended that the therapist acknowledge them for taking a risk in disclosing this information, and assure them that any ambivalent feelings they may be having are normal. The therapist should emphasize that the abuse they have experienced is not their fault, but should keep their feelings of ambivalence in mind and refrain from blaming their partner or telling them what to do. It is unreasonable for the therapist to expect that a victim will leave their perpetrator solely because they disclosed the abuse, and the therapist should respect the victim's autonomy and allow them to make their own decisions regarding termination of the relationship. Finally, the therapist must explore options with the client (such as emergency housing in shelters, police involvement, etc.) in order to uphold their obligation to protect the welfare of the client.

==== Lethality assessment ====
A lethality assessment is a tool that can assist in determining the best course of treatment for a client, as well as helping the client to recognize dangerous behaviors and more subtle abuse in their relationship. In a study of victims of attempted domestic violence-related homicide, only about one-half of the participants recognized that their perpetrator was capable of killing them, as many domestic violence victims minimize the true seriousness of their situation. Thus, lethality assessment is an essential first step in assessing the severity of a victim's situation.

==== Safety planning ====
Safety planning allows the victim to plan for dangerous situations they may encounter, and is effective regardless of their decision on whether remain with their perpetrator. Safety planning usually begins with determining a course of action if another acute incident occurs in the home. The victim should be given strategies for their own safety, such as avoiding confrontations in rooms where there is only one exit and avoiding certain rooms that contain many potential weapons (such as kitchens, bathrooms, etc.).

=== Counseling for offenders ===
The main goal for counselling for offenders of domestic violence is to have them stop the violence and repair the harms they have created. Such work needs to restore the victims' safety and respect, not necessarily restoring the intimate relationship. Counselling for offenders emphasizes minimizing risk to the victim, and should be modified depending on the offender's history, risk of reoffending, and criminogenic needs. The majority of offender treatment programs are 24–36 weeks in length and are conducted in a group setting with groups not exceeding 12 participants.

Gender specific groups (male offenders only or female offenders only) are common in the field. Groups can be helpful to establish group norms that are contrary to the use of violence that, in turn, create a context where offenders are held accountable to their own values in a respectful manner. Successful completion of groups is generally associated with old age, higher levels of education, lower reported drug use, non-violent criminal histories, and longer intimate relationships.

Along with offering group conversations, others incorporate individual and conjoint conversations to assist in ending the violence and repairing the harms. One such approach, which focuses on restorative justice, is highlighted in the critically acclaimed documentary A Better Man. Maclean's reported, "The film manages to be simultaneously agonizing and hopeful… it is revelatory to know these kinds of [restorative] conversations are possible." Film reviewer Miria Bale of Vulture.com heralds the film is a "Revolutionary documentary."

Anger management alone has not been shown to be effective in treating domestic violence offenders because such an approach seldom addresses the societal influences that are influencing offenders choices to perpetrate violence.

Anger management is recommended as a part of an offender program that is based on accountability, along with topics such as recognizing abusive patterns of behavior and re-framing communication skills. Interventions require not only stopping the violence but developing a plan to repair harms. Any corresponding problems should also be addressed as part of domestic violence offender treatment, such as problems with substance abuse or other mental illness.

== Occupational therapy ==
Victims of domestic violence may require occupational therapy to be able to participate in work and to address a diminished skill-set caused by a prolonged absence from the workforce. Occupational therapists work with individuals to develop the skills needed to acquire desired roles and satisfactorily perform everyday tasks. Occupational therapists can provide services through direct or indirect treatment, advocacy efforts, consultation, or group sessions. They may work with victims of domestic violence and their families in a variety of settings such as hospitals, inpatient and outpatient rehabilitation centers, long-term care facilities, mental health facilities, schools, homes, and in shelters or other community programs.

Within any of the practice settings, occupational therapists may encounter victims of domestic violence including individuals who have not reported abuse. Occupational therapists are in a position to uncover information that leads to suspicion of violence or identification of abuse that has occurred. As health care professionals, occupational therapists follow state mandated requirements to report abuse. In treatment sessions, they may encounter individuals who have either chosen to remain in or must move on from an intimate relationship where abuse has occurred. Occupational therapists may see patients for complications directly related to abuse, such as physical injuries. On the other hand, occupational therapy services may be requested for unrelated issues but consequences of violence are addressed after the patient reveals abuse to the therapist.

The consequences of domestic violence may impact the ability to perform daily occupations. Occupational therapy contributes to recovery by enabling victims to create new roles, develop satisfying and productive routines, and gain the self-efficacy necessary to overcome the effects of domestic violence. Occupational therapy interventions may include:

- decision-making skills regarding employment opportunities
- assertiveness skills training
- stress management, calming techniques, and coping strategies
- time and money management
- home management
- community mobility
- parenting skill-building
- communication and interpersonal skills
- self-esteem and self-efficacy
- social participation
- lifestyle modification to establish healthy routines for self-care and sleep.

OT interventions with children who are exposed to domestic violence are focused on promoting age appropriate academic, play, and social skills to facilitate proper development and success in school activities. This may include activities to improve organization, study habits, or attention. Adolescents who have seen or experienced domestic abuse may also benefit from occupational therapy to work on relationship and life skills and learn coping strategies.

== Prevention and intervention ==
education sample

There are many community organizations which work to prevent domestic violence by offering safe shelter, crisis intervention, advocacy, and education and prevention programs. From a 2019 Cochrance review on advocacy interventions (either stand-alone or as a part of other services provided by social services agencies or law enforcement) involves education, safety planning and access to needed services and should be reflective of the individualized needs of the person. Community screening for domestic violence can be more systematic in cases of animal abuse, healthcare settings, emergency departments, behavioral health settings and court systems. Tools are being developed to facilitate domestic violence screening such as mobile apps.

=== Duluth model ===
In 1981, the Duluth Domestic Abuse Intervention Project became the first multi-disciplinary program designed to address the issue of domestic violence. This experiment, conducted in Duluth, Minnesota, frequently referred to as the "Duluth Project" because it is constantly evolving through the help of an entire community. The Domestic Abuse Intervention Program has federal, state and local funders who support them. This funding allows DAIP to explore strategies to end violence to communities throughout the United States and around the world.

The objectives of the Duluth approach:

- Remove the blame from the victim and make the offender accountable for the abuse.
- Create criminal and civil justice systems to hold offenders accountable and keep the victims safe.
- Use the experiences and voices from battered women to improve and create policies.
- Offer court-ordered educational groups for the offenders.
- Review current cases and policies.

A news report from California cites a batterer intervention by The Center for Violence-Free Relationships based on Nonviolent Communication as having demonstrated zero percent recidivism within 5 years, and contrasts this with 40 percent recidivism within 5 years said to have been reported by DAIP for graduates of programs based on the Duluth Model.

== Community-based healing for domestic violence ==
In patriarchal societies, women struggle to make personal decisions over their own bodies or identities which makes them more vulnerable to domestic violence. It is paramount that women gain personal control over their body and a sense of self-efficacy in order to heal from domestic violence. However, women are less inclined to seek such help and healing because of societal norms (such as the expectation that femininity equates to domesticity) and gender disparity. In such contexts, scholars advocate for community-based healing. Where women live in tight-knit communities, such healing is a better option over individualized therapy (which is how trauma healing is approached in the West). Community-based healing focuses on providing psycho-social treatment for traumatized individuals, on building social cohesion among the community members, and on expanding access to healing resources.

=== Social concept of the body ===
The first step for healing involves women understanding the physical and social dimensions of their bodies and how they are depicted and valued in their society and culture. There is a societal pressure for women to please the men of their society at the expense of their own body and mind. This leads to gender inequality as their body is not only theirs but is controlled by hegemonic patriarchal dominance, undermining women's ability to make their own decisions about their lives and their bodies. In many societies, it is progressive feminist movements that are educating women about their bodily functions (a topic considered taboo) and offering women new ways to view and relate to their own bodies.

Ways for women to gain control over their body include the following:

- Freely expressing their own identity, and behaving in ways that are shaped less by men.
- Women looking up to strong female models, and gaining a sense of resiliency.
- Gaining understanding about how to manage/take care of their bodily needs, and how to make informed choices.
- Learning to feel comfortable seeking help when they need it; not feeling deviant for needing to talk about sex and sexuality.

=== Expansion of community-based healing resources ===
Women who have experienced domestic violence are more likely to drink and use drugs as coping mechanism to distort their memories of abuse. Emotions such as abandonment, betrayal, and confusion push them to turn to substance abuse. By expanding services—job-seeking support, group talk therapy, drug use and alcoholism recovery support—a community can help an individual woman battle depression and suicidal thoughts caused by their trauma.

Distribution of resources should be equitable for the community. Victims in a community will be empowered they perceive healing resources as expandable and renewable. In a context of resource scarcity, a woman's capacity to recover is impeded, exacerbating their mental, physical, and emotional health. Cooperation to share personal resources within the community will mitigate further damage as everyone tries to purposefully serve one another without trying to control the resources for personal gain.

In some cases, a community can provide spiritual healing for the women with the goal of fostering their authority over their bodies. Victims of domestic abuse have the tendency to feel helpless and powerless due to the trauma that they experienced. As such participating in a spiritual healing group will help them focus on finding inner peace with their body. There is also a sense that these victims will acknowledge each other's suffering and see that their suffering is not an isolated incident that they need to keep to themselves; this small but empowering step will help women regain their confidence and independence. It is also through group participation that women gain new sources of support, while enhancing or restoring their ability to continue social and interpersonal connections with others.
