= Brooke Ramel =

American singer-songwriter

Brooke Ramel is an American singer-songwriter based in Los Angeles, California. She has released eight studio albums to date; her first album was Movie Star (1996). On December 18, 2000, Ramel appeared as a street performer on the television series 7th Heaven, performing the opening song.

Her songs have featured in movies and television shows, including Dawson's Creek, Charmed, Gilmore Girls, Party of Five, Ed, Six Feet Under, White Oleander and Stealing Harvard. The song "I Wanted You to Know" (from Make Tomorrow Up) has become an unofficial theme song of sorts for the Comedy Central series Drawn Together; it has been featured five times on the show.

== Discography ==
- Movie Star (1996)
- Tulips Bleed (1998)
- Make Tomorrow Up (2000)
- Be (2002)
- Turn It Around (2004)
- By Request (2005)
- Lover's Lullaby (2008)
- For You (2011)
