= Bob Gentry =

American singer-songwriter

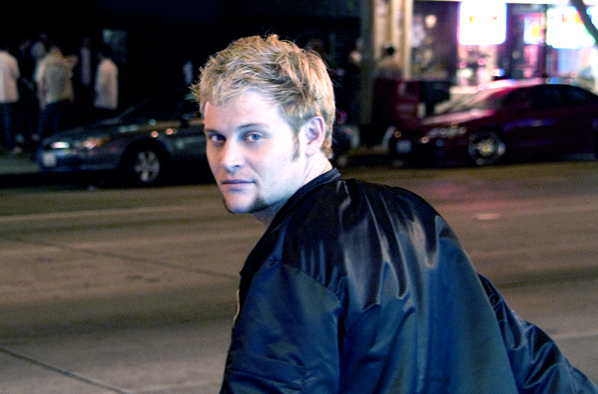

Bob Gentry is an American singer-songwriter.

== Biography ==
Bob Gentry was born in Detroit. By the age of 7, he was a self-taught pianist and guitarist who started songwriting and playing to express himself.

== Moisture ==
In the late-1990s, Gentry formed the rock band Moisture, then moved to Los Angeles and reincarnated the band with new members. Moisture performed live on television and was offered a recording contract from Farmclub.com, a branch of Interscope Records. Farmclub was canceled before Moisture was able to release or record a new album and the group eventually disbanded.

== Solo career ==
As Moisture broke up, Gentry released his first solo album in 2005 and another titled Seconds in 2010. In 2006, he won the Los Angeles Music Award for Singer-Songwriter of the Year in the Rock category. Later that year, his song "Never Know" was placed in the Fox TV series Bones. Also in 2006, he joined the cast of the NBC show StarTomorrow, which featured David Foster as the head judge. Gentry made it to the finals. The Gentry song "Beat into You" is on the soundtrack to the film Hollywood & Wine, which will be released in 2011.

== Discography ==
- Moisture – "Bastard" 1996
- Moisture – "Moisture" 2001
- Bob Gentry – "Bob Gentry 2004
- Bob Gentry – "Seconds" 2010
