= Stacie Huckeba =

American journalist

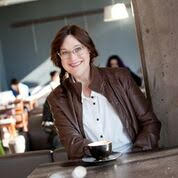
- Huckeba at Ugly Mugs coffee house, in Nashville, Tennessee
- Born: July 29, 1968 (age 56); Odessa, Texas, U.S.
- Occupation(s): Photographer, director, producer, writer, public speaker
- Website: staciehuckeba.com

Stacie Huckeba (born July 29, 1968) is an American photographer, film director, writer and public speaker.

== Biography ==
Born in Odessa, Texas, Huckeba began her career in the 1990s by photographing bands like Pearl Jam, White Zombie, Red Hot Chili Peppers, Public Enemy and David Bowie's Tin Machine.

In 2006, she moved to Nashville, Tennessee, where she began working in the Americana genre with artists like Todd Snider, Will Kimbrough and Elizabeth Cook as well as the Americana Music Association.

In 2007, her career evolved into film production, directing two music videos "Unbreakable" and "The Highland Street Incident" along with the short film "Come to East Nashville" for Todd Snider's "The Devil You Know" DVD which was released through Universal Music Group's New Door Records. In 2011 she directed and produced the full-length live performance double disc DVD "Todd Snider, The Storyteller" which was released on Aimless Records.

She has since worked with artists such as Dolly Parton, Billy Joel, Loretta Lynn, Buddy Guy and Marty Stuart.

In 2012, she began producing the audio and video portions of the oral history programs for the Rock and Roll Hall of Fame and Museum. And in 2015 began doing the same for the International Bluegrass Music Hall of Fame.

Her photographs and videos have appeared worldwide through USA Today, Rolling Stone, Rolling Stone Country, The Wall Street Journal, Vintage Guitar, Country Weekly, Sound on Sound, The Huffington Post, The Nashville Network, and CMT among others.

She was commissioned in 2012 for a series of photographs that are part of a permanent installation at the downtown Nashville Omni Hotel & Resort.

She worked as a camera operator in 2003 on the Finnish documentary “Monsterman” and in 2016 served as the Director of Photography on a full-length documentary by Crossfilm Limited out of London covering the life of Christopher Cross, release date 2017.

In 2013, she began contributing regularly for the Huffington Post and in 2016 became a regular column contributor in the Nashville magazine, The East Nashvillian.
