= Shooter Jennings discography =

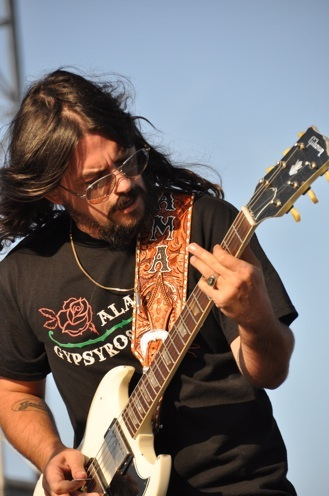
- Studio albums: 10
- Live albums: 4
- Singles: 13

American musician Shooter Jennings has released ten studio albums and four live albums. Active as a musician since 2001, he first released music in the band Stargunn, which issued one album in 2001. Jennings' solo debut, Put the "O" Back in Country, came out in 2005 and accounted for his only chart single to date, the George Jones collaboration "4th of July". This was his first album for Universal South Records (now Show Dog-Universal Music), while later releases have been on his own Black Country Rock Media label.

== Albums ==
=== Studio albums ===
Title	Details	Peak chart positions					
Title	Details	US Country	US	US Heat	US Indie	US Rock	US Dance
Put the "O" Back in Country	Release date: March 1, 2005; Label: Universal South Records; Formats: CD, LP, music download	22	124	1	—	—	—
Electric Rodeo	Release date: April 4, 2006; Label: Universal South Records; Formats: CD, LP, music download	12	64	—	—	—	—
The Wolf	Release date: October 23, 2007; Label: Universal South Records; Formats: CD, LP, music download	12	52	—	—	—	—
Black Ribbons	Release date: March 2, 2010; Label: Black Country Rock/Rocket Science; Formats: CD, LP, music download	—	133	—	16	34	—
Family Man	Release date: March 13, 2012; Label: Black Country Rock/E1 Music; Formats: CD, LP, music download	10	53	—	10	—	—
The Other Life	Release date: March 12, 2013; Label: Black Country Rock/E1 Music; Formats: CD, LP, music download	19	130	—	19	—	—
Fenixon (with Waylon Jennings)	Release date: April 19, 2014; Label: Black Country Rock; Formats: LP, music download	—	—	—	—	—	—
Don’t Wait Up (For George) EP	Release date: August 5, 2014; Label: Black Country Rock; Formats: EP, music download	23	—	—	30	—	—
Countach (For Giorgio)	Release date: February 26, 2016; Label: Black Country Rock; Formats: CD, LP, music download	—	—	—	—	—	7
Shooter	Release date: August 10, 2018; Label: Low Country Sound/Elektra; Formats: CD, LP, music download	42	—	—	—	—	—
Sometimes Y (with Yelawolf)	Release date: March 11, 2022; Label: Slumerican; Formats: CD, LP, music download	—	—	—	—	—	—
"—" denotes releases that did not chart

=== Stargunn albums ===
Title	Details
The Only Way Up Is Down, Part One	Release date: June 14, 2001; Label: The Electric Banana Company; Formats: CD

=== Live albums ===
Title	Details	Peak positions
Title	Details	US Country
Live at Irving Plaza 4.18.06	Release date: October 10, 2006; Label: Universal South Records; Formats: CD, music download	55
The Other Live	Release date: November 26, 2013; Label: Black Country Rock; Formats: CD, LP, music download	
Live on Tour (with Waymore's Outlaws)	Release date: April 22, 2017; Label: Black Country Rock; Formats: LP	
Live at Billy Bob's Texas	Release date: November 10, 2017; Label: Black Country Rock/Smith Music Group; Formats: CD, LP, music download	
Shooter Jennings and the Werewolves of Los Angeles Do Zevon	Release date: November 3, 2023; Formats: LP, CD, music download	

=== Compilation albums ===
Title	Details	Peak positions
Title	Details	US Country
Bad Magick: The Best of Shooter Jennings and the .357's	Release date: March 24, 2009; Label: Universal South Records; Formats: CD, music download	45

=== Singles ===
Year	Single	Peak positions	Album
Year	Single	US Country	Album
2005	"4th of July" (featuring George Jones)	26	Put the "O" Back in Country
2005	"Steady at the Wheel"	—	Put the "O" Back in Country
2006	"Aviators"	—	Put the "O" Back in Country
2006	"Gone to Carolina"	—	Electric Rodeo
2006	"Some Rowdy Women"	—	Electric Rodeo
2007	"It Ain't Easy"	—	Electric Rodeo
2007	"Walk of Life"	—	The Wolf
2008	"This Ol' Wheel"	—	The Wolf
2009	"Wake Up!"	—	Black Ribbons
2011	"Outlaw You"	—	The Other Life
2012	"The Deed and the Dollar"	—	Family Man
2012	"The Real Me"	—	Family Man
2014	"The Magic" (with Heirophant)	—	Non-album singles
2021	"From Here To Eternity (Goof The Floof Remix)"	—	Non-album singles
"—" denotes releases that did not chart

=== Other appearances ===
Year	Title	Album
2000	"White Lines and Black Ties" (with Stargunn)	Music from: The Crew
2001	"KatWalk" (with Stargunn)	Made: The Soundtrack
2003	"I've Always Been Crazy" (with Stargunn)	I've Always Been Crazy: A Tribute to Waylon Jennings
2004	"Please Carry Me Home" (with Jessi Colter)	Songs Inspired by The Passion of the Christ
2005	"I'm a Long Way from Home"	Walk the Line: The Original Motion Picture Soundtrack
2005	"Busted in Baylor County"	The Dukes of Hazzard OST
2005	"The Silver Tongued Devil & I"	The Pilgrim: A Celebration of Kris Kristofferson
2006	"If It Ain't One Thing"(with Carter Falco)	If It Ain't One Thing
2006	"Long Gone" (with Carter Falco)	If It Ain't One Thing
2006	"Better Before You Were Big Time" (with Ted Russel Kamp)	Divisadero
2007	"Good Hearted Woman" (with Deana Carter)	The Chain
2008	"The Iron Wheel" (with The Nightwatchman)	The Fabled City
2008	"Never Work in This Town Again" (with Matt Reasor & the Madness )	Pentecostal Pasta Salad
2008	"I Found the Body" (with Waylon Jennings)	Waylon Forever
2008	"Waymore Blues" (with Waylon Jennings)	Waylon Forever
2009	"The War on the Terror and the Drugs" (with Ike Reilly)	Hard Luck Stories
2010	"Call Me the Breeze"	Sweet Home Alabama: The Country Music Tribute To Lynyrd Skynyrd
2011	"Belle of the Ball"	Music Inside - Collaboration Dedicated to Waylon Vol 1
2011	"Fuck You, I'm Famous!"	Music From The Television series Californication
2012	"I Miss My Boyfriend" (with Folk Uke)	ReinCarnation
2012	"Hot Rod" (with Joecephus and The George Jonestown Massacre)	Single only
2012	"1922" (with Last False Hope)	Outlaw Radio Chicago: The Compilation Volume II
2012	"Drinkin' Side of Country" (with Bucky Covington)	Good Guys
2012	"Cocaine Blues" (with Amy Nelson)	We Walk the Line: A Celebration of the Music of Johnny Cash
2012	"The Highwaymen" (with Kris Kristofferson, Jamey Johnson, and Willie Nelson)	We Walk the Line: A Celebration of the Music of Johnny Cash
2012	"All of This Could Have Been Yours"	Sons of Anarchy Soundtrack
2012	"Wild & Lonesome" (with Patti Griffin)	Sons of Anarchy Soundtrack
2013	"Wild Child" (with Fifth on the Floor)	Ashes & Angels
2013	"Angels in the Snow" (with Fifth on the Floor)	Ashes & Angels
2013	"Another Place and Another Time" (with Struggle)	I Am Struggle
2013	"Come On Caroline" (with Husky Burnette)	Tales from East End Blvd.
2013	"You Are My Sunshine" (with Jamey Johnson and Jeordie White)	BCR Mystery Release
2013	"Out of the Rain"(with Jessi Colter)	Live at the Cains Ballroom: Jessi Colter
2013	"Please Carry Me Home" (with Jessi Colter)	Live at the Cains Ballroom: Jessi Colter
2014	"Nashville from Afar"	Black Country Rock 2014 Mixtape
2014	"She Talks to Rainbows"	Black Country Rock 2014 Mixtape
2015	"Oh Sweet Nuthin’"(with Lukas Nelson)	A Civilized Hell
2015	"Civilized Hell"(with Lukas Nelson)	A Civilized Hell
2015	"The Man in My Room"	Black Country Rock 2015 Mixtape
2015	"Killin' the Blues" (with Billy Ray Cyrus)	Killin' the Blues
2015	"Whistlers and Jugglers"	Outlaw Jazz
2015	"In the Cold, Cold Night"(with Wanda Jackson)	Rockin' Legends Pay Tribute to Jack White
2015	"Bob Wills Is Still the King" (with Asleep at the Wheel)	Still the King: Celebrating the Music of Bob Wills and His Texas Playboys
2016	"Can You Come Over?"	Southern Family
2016	"Killin' the Blues" (with Billy Ray Cyrus)	Thin Line
2016	"Rebound"	Feel Like Going Home: The Songs of Charlie Rich
2016	"Coming Home"	The Ranch Soundtrack
2018	"Trouble Man" (with Dale Justice)	Trouble Man
2018	"Love Won" (with Struggle Jennings)	WWII
2018	"Invitation to the Blues" (with Jessi Colter)	King of the Road: A Tribute to Roger Miller
2020	"Mammas Don't Let Your Babies Grow Up to Be Cowboys" (with Lukas Nelson)	Music From The Ranch (TV series)
2020	"Warrior Man"	Squidbillies Soundtrack
2020	"Hurt So Bad" (with Jaime Wyatt)	Neon Cross
2020	"Ode To Ben Dorcy" (with Randy Rogers & Wade Bowen)	Hold My Beer Vol. II
2020	"Home Sweet Hollywood" (with Ted Russell Kamp)	Down In The Den
2021	"Baby, Please Don't Go" (with Michael Devin)	Chasing Whiskey: The Untold Story of Jack Daniel's
2021	"Trees / Sweet Fire"	Chasing Whiskey: The Untold Story of Jack Daniel's
2021	"Whiskey Woman"	Chasing Whiskey: The Untold Story of Jack Daniel's
2021	"Survive The Fire"	Chasing Whiskey: The Untold Story of Jack Daniel's
2021	"Sweet Fire (Reprise)"	Chasing Whiskey: The Untold Story of Jack Daniel's
2021	"Maybe California"	Butterfly: The Songs Of Neal Casal

=== Digital exclusives ===
==== Albums ====
Title	Details
Missed the Boat: A Collection of Demos & Rarities	Release date: December 25, 2010; Label: Black Country Rock; Formats: music
Outlaw You	Release date: August 15, 2011; Label: Black Country Rock; Formats: music download

==== Black Ribbons: The Living Album ====
Title	Details
Memorial Auditorium, Raleigh, NC	Release date: April 21, 2010; Label: Black Country Rock; Formats: USB
Delaware Valley College, Doylestown, PA	Release date: April 23, 2010; Label: Black Country Rock; Formats: USB
Memorial Auditorium, St Augustine, FL	Release date: April 25, 2010; Label: Black Country Rock; Formats: USB
Thomas Wolfe Auditorium, Asheville, NC	Release date: April 27, 2010; Label: Black Country Rock; Formats: USB
Memorial Auditorium, Chattanooga, TN	Release date: April 28, 2010; Label: Black Country Rock; Formats: USB
Cat's Cradle, Carrboro, NC	Release date: September 16, 2010; Label: Black Country Rock; Formats: USB
Lewis Ginter Botanical Garden, Richmond, VA	Release date: April 24, 2010; Label: Black Country Rock; Formats: USB
Soul Kitchen, Mobile, AL	Release date: September 11, 2010; Label: Black Country Rock; Formats: USB

== Videography ==
Year	Video	Director
2005	"4th of July"	Roger Pistole
2005	"Steady at the Wheel"	James Minchin
2006	"Gone to Carolina"	Dean Karr
2007	"It Ain't Easy"	Dean Karr
2007	"Walk of Life"	Deaton-Flanigen Productions
2010	"Summer of Rage"	Drea & Shooter
2011	"Lights in the Sky"	Drea & Shooter
2011	"Outlaw You"	Drea & Shooter
2011	"Outlaw You"	Blake Judd
2012	"The Deed and the Dollar"	Blake Judd
2012	"The Real Me"	Blake Judd
2012	"Drinking Side of Country" (with Bucky Covington)	Blake Judd
2013	"The Other Life"	Blake Judd
2013	"Wild And Lonesome"	Blake Judd
2013	"The Gunslinger"	Blake Judd
2014	"Don't Wait Up (I'm Playing Possum)"	
2014	"She Talks to Rainbows"	Christoph Heuer
2016	"Love Kills"	Blake Judd
2016	"Cat People" ft. Marilyn Manson	Valenburg & Blake Judd
