= When the Balladeer Met the Dukes =

Compilation album by Waylon Jennings and The Waylors
- Released: April 18, 2026
- Recorded: 1979
- Studio: American (Nashville)
- Genres: Country; spoken word; instrumental
- Length: 32:00
- Labels: Son of Jessi; Thirty Tigers
- Producers: Waylon Jennings Richie Albright Shooter Jennings

Waylon Jennings and The Waylors chronology
Songbird (2025)	When the Balladeer Met the Dukes (2026)	Diamonds (2026)

When the Balladeer Met the Dukes is a posthumous, physical release only compilation album by American country music singer Waylon Jennings and his backing band, The Waylors, set to be released on Son of Jessi through Thirty Tigers on Record Store Day, on April 18, 2026.

== Background ==
On February 4, 2026, the album was announced to be releasing on Record Store Day on April 18, 2026, as an RSD exclusive with only 1,500 copies being pressed onto a neon orange vinyl LP. The album features original recordings from Waylon and The Waylors during recordings and outtakes in the production of the first season of The Dukes of Hazzard from 1979.

== Personnel ==
Musicians

- Waylon Jennings — vocals, balladeer
- Richie Albright — drums
- Ralph Mooney — pedal steel
- Jerry "Jigger" Bridges — bass
- Barny Robertson — keys
- Gordon "Crank" Payne — guitar
- Rance Wasson — guitar

Technical

- Richie Albright — production
- Shooter Jennings — mixing
- Nate Haessly — engineering
- Pete Lyman — mastering

== Track listing ==
When the Balladeer Met the Dukes track listing
No.	Title	Writer(s)	Length
1.	"Waylon's Initial Voiceover Sessions and Bloopers (Side A)"	Gy Waldron	16:00
2.	"Season One Instrumental Tracks (Side B)"	The Waylors	16:00
Total length:			32:00
