= Diamonds (Waylon Jennings song) =

2026 single by Waylon Jennings

Single by Waylon Jennings

from the album Diamonds
- Released: June 21, 2026
- Recorded: December 28, 1978
- Studio: American Studios (Nashville, Tennessee); Sunset Sound Studio 3 (Los Angeles, California)
- Genre: Country
- Length: 4:00
- Label: Son of Jessi; Thirty Tigers
- Songwriters: Waylon Jennings; Glen Campbell
- Producers: Jennings; Richie Albright; Tony Joe White; Shooter Jennings

Waylon Jennings singles chronology
"The Cowboy (Small Texas Town)" (2025)	"Diamonds" (2026)

Music video
- "Diamonds" on YouTube

"Diamonds" is a song by American country music singer Waylon Jennings. It was released on June 21, 2026 as the lead single and title track to his forty-eighth studio album Diamonds.

== Background ==
=== Recording ===
The song was co-written between Waylon Jennings and Glen Campbell and recorded on the night of December 28, 1978. The session was produced between Jennings, Richie Albright, and Tony Joe White.

The song was released on June 21, 2026 as the titletrack to the second installment, in a trio of posthumous albums for Waylon released by his son, Shooter Jennings.
