= Diamonds (Waylon Jennings album) =

Studio album by Waylon Jennings
- Released: November 13, 2026
- Recorded: 1973–1984 (original recordings); 2024–2026 (additional overdubs)
- Studios: American (Nashville); Sunset (Los Angeles)
- Genres: Country; outlaw country
- Length: 38:48
- Labels: Black Country Rock Media; Son of Jessi; Thirty Tigers
- Producers: Waylon Jennings; Richie Albright; Tony Joe White; Shooter Jennings; Charley Crockett

Waylon Jennings chronology
When the Balladeer Met the Dukes (2026)	Diamonds (2026)

Singles from Diamonds
- 1. "Diamonds" Released: June 21, 2026; 2. "Same Old Blues" Released: September 11, 2026; 3. "Saturday Night Special" Released: October 27, 2026

Diamonds is the forty-eighth studio album by American country music singer Waylon Jennings, released posthumously as a physical release on November 13, 2026, and later onto streaming on December 11, 2026, by Thirty Tigers and Son of Jessi.

== Background ==
In April 2026, billboards popped up in California with a picture of Waylon Jennings smoking a cigarette while sitting in his 1974 Cadillac Eldorado with the words 'Diamonds' and '2026' inscribed into it. The car today is owned by Kid Rock, and was converted to a tribute car to Jennings by West Coast Customs in April 2017.

On June 19, 2026, the album's name was officially confirmed by CBS News as being Diamonds, reporting the album would drop later in the year.

On June 20, 2026, the album was posted to various record shops across the country, revealing the tracklist, album art, and some of the personnel on the album. It is set to be released physically on November 13, 2026, while coming to streaming on December 11, 2026.

== Recording ==
The album's opening and title track Diamonds was recorded on the night of December 28, 1978, with Glen Campbell playing guitar on the track alongside The Waylors as well as co-writing the track with Waylon. Richie Albright and Tony Joe White produced the session with Waylon handling post-production.

The third track, I Never Said It Would Be Easy, was recorded on April 14, 1978, on the same day as I've Always Been Crazy at American Studios and was released as the B-Side to I've Always Been Crazy in June 1978. The track never released on an album or as a single, and has never made its way to streaming platforms, leading it to being a largely forgotten track in Waylon's catalogue.

The albums second track, Saturday Night Special, according to Shooter, was the only track he found in a fully unfinished state in the entire batch of recordings. The song reportedly had only the keys laid down and Waylon's vocal tracks. Shooter would enlist The Waylors and Mickey Raphael to finish the song.

Born Too Late, the albums eleventh and second to final track, was recorded sometime in the 1980s. It was posted to YouTube by its writer, Zack Van Arsdale, on February 21, 2012 although was never officially released in any capacity until this album. The albums version is expected to feature a different final mix and comping, as it is around 20 seconds shorter than the one originally posted.

== Release ==
The album's first single as well as its opening and title track Diamonds was released on June 21, 2026.

== Track listing ==
No.	Title	Writer(s)	Length
1.	"Diamonds"	Waylon Jennings; Glen Campbell	4:00
2.	"Saturday Night Special"	Lee Clayton	2:22
3.	"I Never Said It Would Be Easy"	Jerry Foster; Bill Rice	3:05
4.	"I'm Tired" (with Jessi Colter)	Mel Tillis; Ray Price; A.R. Peddy; Buck Peddy	2:50
5.	"Wild & Blue"	John Scott Sherrill	2:57
6.	"The Good Things Don't Last Very Long"	Jennings	3:05
7.	"She Smiles Like a River"	Leon Russell	2:58
8.	"I Just Ain't Been Able"	Hank Williams Jr.	2:27
9.	"Lost Love Song"	Jennings	3:35
10.	"Same Old Blues" (with Jessi Colter)	J.J. Cale	2:39
11.	"Born Too Late"	Zack Van Arsdale	3:24
12.	"Words"	Barry Gibb; Maurice Gibb; Robin Gibb	5:26

== Personnel ==
=== Musicians ===
- Waylon Jennings – lead vocals, guitar
- Richie Albright – drums
- Jessi Colter – vocals
- Glen Campbell – guitar
- Reggie Young – guitar
- Fred Carter Jr. – guitar
- Rance Wasson – guitar
- Tony Joe White – guitar
- Gordon 'Crank' Payne – guitar
- Ralph Mooney – pedal steel
- Sherman Hayes – bass
- Bee Spears – bass
- Barny Robertson – keyboard
- Don Brooks – harmonica, backing vocals

=== Later overdubs ===
- Mickey Raphael – harmonica
- Sofia Session Orchestra & Choir – strings
- Twin Temple – strings arrangement (track 12)

=== Technical ===
- Waylon Jennings – producer
- Richie Albright – producer
- Tony Joe White – producer
- Shooter Jennings – producer, executive producer, engineer, mastering, mixing
- Charley Crockett – executive producer
- Georgi Elenkov – string producer (track 12)
- Nate Haessly – mixing, engineering assistance
- Daniel Bacigalupi – assistance
- Pete Lyman – mastering
- David Spreng – additional recording

=== Visuals ===
- Big Hassle Media – artwork
- Jeri Heiden / SMOG Design – package design

== Charts ==
Chart performance for Diamonds
Chart (2026)	Peak position
Australian Country Albums (ARIA)	34
UK Americana Albums (Official Charts)	15
UK Country Albums (Official Charts)	3
UK Independent Albums (Official Charts)	33
