= Bad Magick: The Best of Shooter Jennings and the .357's =

Greatest hits album by Shooter Jennings
- Released: March 24, 2009
- Genre: Southern rock; country
- Label: Universal South
- Producer: Dave Cobb

Shooter Jennings chronology
The Wolf (2007)	Bad Magick: The Best of Shooter Jennings and the .357's (2009)	Black Ribbons (2010)

Professional ratings
Review scores
Source	Rating
Allmusic	3/5 stars

Bad Magick: The Best of Shooter Jennings and the .357's is the first compilation album released by Shooter Jennings. It was released March 24, 2009 via Universal South Records. The album includes tracks from his first three studio albums — 2005's Put the "O" Back in Country, 2006's Electric Rodeo and 2007's The Wolf. Also included is the live recording of "Daddy's Farm". "Living Proof" is a cover of Hank Williams, Jr.'s 1976 single, and is new to this album. The album also includes a cover of Lonesome On'ry and Mean, a song which was covered in 1973 by Waylon Jennings.

== Track listing ==
All tracks are written by All tracks written by Shooter Jennings except where noted.

No.	Title	Writer(s)	Length
1.	"4th of July" (featuring George Jones)		4:27
2.	"Gone to Carolina"		4:06
3.	"Southern Comfort" (featuring Faith Evans, Jessi Colter and CeCe White)	Jennings, LeRoy Powell, Ted Russell Kamp	5:50
4.	"The Wolf"		4:01
5.	"Manifesto No. 1"		3:10
6.	"Walk of Life"	Mark Knopfler	3:59
7.	"It Ain't Easy"		3:05
8.	"This Ol' Wheel"		3:42
9.	"Busted in Baylor County"	Jennings, Powell, John Osbourne, Tony Iommi, Terence Butler, William Ward	3:53
10.	"Slow Train" (featuring The Oak Ridge Boys)	Powell	3:41
11.	"Bad Magick"		5:12
12.	"Steady at the Wheel"	Kamp	2:58
13.	"Daddy's Farm"		9:20
14.	"Lonesome Blues"	Powell	4:30
15.	"Living Proof"	Hank Williams, Jr.	4:29

== Chart performance ==
Chart (2009)	Peak position
U.S. Billboard Top Country Albums	45
