= The Lost Nashville Sessions =

Compilation album by Waylon Jennings
- Released: October 7, 2016
- Recorded: July 13, 1970
- Studio: Music City Recorders (Nashville)
- Genre: Country
- Length: 46:32
- Label: Country Rewind
- Producers: Scotty Moore Robby Turner

Waylon Jennings chronology
Live 55 (2015)	The Lost Nashville Sessions (2016)	New Stuff (2017)

The Lost Nashville Sessions is a posthumous album by American country music singer Waylon Jennings, released on Country Rewind Records, on October 7, 2016.

== Background ==
=== Recording ===
The album was recorded in one day on July 13, 1970 at Music City Recorders, initially to be played on military radio in Vietnam during the Vietnam War in the early-1970s.

=== Release ===
Robby Turner, who found and remastered the album, would release the album through Country Rewind Records on October 7, 2016 with the permission of Jessi Colter and Shooter Jennings.

== Track listing ==
The Lost Nashville Sessions track listing
No.	Title	Writer(s)	Length
1.	"Only Daddy That'll Walk the Line"	Ivy J. Bryant	3:13
2.	"The Chokin' Kind"	Harlan Howard	2:32
3.	"Stop the World (and Let Me Off)"	Carl Belew; W.S. Stevenson; Merle Haggard	3:02
4.	"Anita, You're Dreaming"	Waylon Jennings; Don Bowman	2:24
5.	"Just to Satisfy You"	Jennings; Bowman	4:05
6.	"Green River"	Howard	3:02
7.	"Singer of Sad Songs"	Alexis Zanetis	3:19
8.	"Love of the Common People"	John Hurley; Ronnie Wilkins	3:25
9.	"MacArthur Park"	Jimmy Webb	4:40
10.	"Brown Eyed Handsome Man"	Chuck Berry	2:43
11.	"Mental Revenge"	Mel Tillis	3:49
12.	"Time to Bum Again"	Howard	3:36
13.	"Sunday Mornin' Comin' Down"	Kris Kristofferson	4:06
14.	"Young Widow Brown"	Jennings; Sky Corbin	3:06
15.	"Kentucky Woman"	Neil Diamond	3:06
Total length:			46:32

== Personnel ==
Musicians

- Waylon Jennings — lead vocals, electric guitar
- Richie Albright — drums
- Robby Turner — pedal steel, dobro, keys, backing vocals
- Paul Martin — bass, drums, backing vocals
- Colene Waters — backing vocals
- Jamie Martin — backing vocals

Technical

- Scotty Moore — production
- Robby Turner — production, mixing, mastering
- Thomas Gramuglia — executive producer
- Paul Martin — recording
- Robby Turner — mixing
- Mack Evans — recording, mixing
- Kevin Nix — mastering
- John Jungklaus — original master tape transfers
- Jeff Powell — lacquer cut
- Rainbo Records — pressing

Visuals

- Jeff Taylor — graphics
- Robby Turner — photography
- Preshias Harris — liner notes author
