= Ted Russell Kamp =

American singer-songwriter

- Genres: Country rock
- Occupation(s): Composer; Arranger; Producer; Performer
- Instrument(s): Guitar; Bass; Mandolin; Lap Steel Guitar; Keyboards
- Years active: 1995–present
- Labels: PoMo; Kufala; Dualtone
- Website: tedrussellkamp.com

Ted Russell Kamp is an American singer-songwriter. He is the bassist for Shooter Jennings' backing band. As a solo artist, Kamp has released 11 albums.

== Biography ==
Born in New York, Kamp grew up in the Northeast U.S. before moving to Seattle where he began his music career. He fronted a trio, Ponticello, which released four albums. During this time, Kamp released his first solo album, Dedications (1996). Kamp moved to Los Angeles in 2001 and started a new group, Union Pacific. He performed with other bands and worked as a session musician before being hired as the bassist for Shooter Jennings' band, the .357s.

Kamp also continued his solo career, with his album Divisadero ranked as #34 on the Americana Music Association's 2007 chart.

In 2011, Kamp released Get Back to the Land, which made the top 25 on the Americana Radio Chart and was #1 on the Euro Americana Chart.

In January 2013, Kamp released Night Owl, which made the US Americana Radio Chart (#34) and the Euro Americana Chart (#15).

Kamp self-released The Low and Lonesome Sound in 2015, followed a year later by the acoustic album Flying Solo. He joined Ted Wulfers to record the classic song Tulsa Time to help support the Red Cross of Oklahoma. 100% of the proceeds were donated to The Oklahoma Red Cross.

Kamp is also an established producer in the music industry.

== Discography ==
=== Solo albums ===
- 1996: Dedications (Poetry Of The Moment [PoMo])
- 2005: Northsouth (PoMo)
- 2005: The Ponticello Years (Kufala)
- 2006: Nashville Fineline (Kufala)
- 2007: Divisadero (PoMo)
- 2008: Poor Man's Paradise (Dualtone / PoMo)
- 2010: California Country Soul, Vol. 2 : Ballads (PoMo)
- 2011: Get Back To The Land (Dualtone / PoMo)
- 2013: Night Owl (PoMo)
- 2015: The Low and Lonesome Sound (self-released via CD Baby)
- 2016: Flying Solo [Audio & Video Labs, Inc.)
- 2019: Walkin' Shoes (PoMo Records)
- 2020: Down in the den
- 2021: Solitaire
- 2024: California Son

=== With Shooter Jennings ===
- 2005: Put the "O" Back in Country (Universal South)
- 2006: Electric Rodeo (Universal South)
- 2006: Live at Irving Plaza 4.18.06 (Universal South)
- 2014: Don't Wait Up (For George) EP (Black Country Rock)
- 2016: Black Ribbons (Black Country Rock)
- 2016: Countach (For Giorgio) (Black Country Rock)

=== As primary artist/song contributor ===
- 2009: various artists – A Bob Dylan Tribute: So Happy Just To See You Smile (Hanky Panky) – track 15, "Dignity"
- 2010: various artists – I Like It Better Here – More Music From Home (Hemifrån) – track 14, "You Are My Home"

=== As guest musician ===
- 2007: Gina Villalobos – Miles Away (Face West)
- 2008: Waylon Jennings and the 357's – Waylon Forever (Vagrant)
- 2010: Shy Blakeman – Long Distance Man (Winding Road)
- 2014: Calico the Band – Rancho California (California Country)
- 2014: Creekwood – 2000 Miles West
- 2015: Alice Wallace – Memories Music & Pride (California Country)
- 2015: Sam Morrow – There is No Map (Forty Below / Relativity)
- 2016: Ry Bradley – You Me and the Music (self-released)
- 2018: Dale Justice – Trouble Man (Hillbilly Highway)
- 2021: Chris Armes – Ocotillo Rose (Yucca Thunder){{ }}
- 2023: Diplo, Sturgill Simpson, and Dove Cameron Use Me (Brutal Hearts loop)
