= Justin Wells (musician) =

American singer-songwriter

- Born: Justin William Wells; August 11, 1982 (age 43); Bossier City, Louisiana, US
- Genres: Country; roots rock
- Occupation: Singer-songwriter
- Instruments: Vocals guitar
- Years active: 2006–present
- Labels: Rock Creek Music; Black Country Rock Media; Entertainment One
- Website: justinwellsmusic.com

Justin William Wells (born August 11, 1982) is an American country music and roots rock singer-songwriter. Wells has released three solo albums, as well as four albums as singer/songwriter/rhythm guitarist for former Lexington, Kentucky alternative country/southern rock band Fifth on the Floor.

== Personal life ==
Wells is married and lives with his wife in Lexington, Kentucky. They have identical twin daughters.

== Career ==
Wells started writing songs and performing in high school. He moved to Lexington, Kentucky in 2005 to start a band, and a year later founded Fifth on the Floor. Fifth on the Floor self-released two albums, 2007's The Color of Whiskey and 2010's Dark and Bloody Ground. In 2013, they released their third full-length, Ashes & Angels, produced by multiple Grammy-winning producer/artist Shooter Jennings and released by Black Country Rock/Entertainment One. In January 2015, the band announced they were breaking up. Their final release, the EP & After, was released that same month.

On August 5, 2016, Wells released his debut solo album, Dawn in the Distance. The album was produced by Duane Lundy.

On August 9, 2018, Wells released a single, "A Love Song", as part of the 10 in 20 Series, a series that has featured a number of Grammy-winning and nominated artists, including Sturgill Simpson, Matt Duncan, and Justin Craig. The next day, Jason Eady released his album I Travel On, which included a co-write with Wells, "Pretty When I Die". Later that year, Wells released a physical-only 7" vinyl single that included a stripped-down version of "The Dogs" and a cover of Elton John's "Mona Lisas and Mad Hatters".

On August 28, 2020, Wells released his second studio album, The United State, also produced by Lundy.

On February 20, 2025, Wells released his third studio album, Cynthiana, a tribute to his wife which took its name from the small central Kentucky town where they met as kids. The first single "Counting Days" was filmed at Ohio Valley Wrestling's Davis Arena, and starred OVW wrestler and Tulsa King/Netflix's Wrestlers actor Mike "Ca$h Flo" Walden.

== Discography ==
=== Studio albums ===
Title	Album details	Peak positions
Title	Album details	US Country
Dawn in the Distance	Release date: August 5, 2016; Label: August Music	—
The United State	Release date: August 28, 2020; Label: August Music	—
Cynthiana	Release date: February 20, 2025; Label: August Music	—
"—" denotes releases that did not chart

=== Extended plays ===
Title	Album details	Peak positions
Title	Album details	US Country
Justin Wells | OurVinyl Sessions	Release date: November 30, 2022; Label: OurVinyl	—
"—" denotes releases that did not chart

=== Singles ===
Title	Album	Peak positions
Title	Album	US Country
A Love Song	Release date: August 9, 2018; 10 in 20 Round 2	—
The Dogs b/w Mona Lisas and Mad Hatters	Release date: December 22, 2018; Label: Need To Know	—
Hard Out Here	Release date: June 18, 2021; Label: August Music	—
The Dogs (Acoustic)	Release date: August 6, 2021; Label: August Music	—
Blue Moon of Kentucky	Release date: December 28, 2021; Label: August Music	—
"—" denotes releases that did not chart

=== Fifth on the Floor albums ===
Title	Album details	Peak positions
Title	Album details	US Country
The Color of Whiskey	Release date: December 4, 2007; Label: Independent	—
Dark and Bloody Ground	Release date: March 2, 2010; Label: SOL Records	—
Ashes & Angels	Release date: March 12, 2013; Label: Black Country Rock/eOne Music	64

=== Fifth on the Floor extended plays ===
Title	Album details	Peak positions
Title	Album details	US Country
& After EP	Release date: January 20, 2015; Label: Independent	—
"—" denotes releases that did not chart

== Other album appearances ==
Year	Title	Album
2014	"Blood, Sweat, and Tears" (with Those Crosstown Rivals)	Hell and Back
2016	"A Little Misunderstood" (with Brian Combs)	Sad Songs and Other Natural Disasters
2016	"Like Gasoline" (with Brian Combs)	Sad Songs and Other Natural Disasters
2016	"She Thinks That I'm Her Stone" (with Brian Combs)	Sad Songs and Other Natural Disasters

== Videography ==
Year	Video	Director
2011	"Distant Memory Lane"	Blake Judd
2013	"January in Louisiana"	Blake Judd
2013	"Whiskey"	Blake Judd
2016	"Going Down Grinnin'"	Casey Pierce
2016	"The Dogs"	Casey Pierce
2017	"Still No Rain"	Casey Pierce
2018	"So Far Away"	Jon Scott
2018	"A Love Song"	John Buckman
2020	"You'll Never Know, Dear, How Much I Love You"	Jon Scott
2020	"The Screaming Song"	Casey Pierce
2020	"No Time for a Broken Heart"	Casey Pierce
2020	"Walls Fall Down"	Casey Pierce
2024	"Counting Days"	Casey Pierce
2024	"Sad, Tomorrow"	Casey Pierce

== Other video appearances ==
Year	Title	Video Artist
2011	"Outlaw You"	Shooter Jennings
2012	"The Real Me"	Shooter Jennings
2013	"A Hard Lesson to Learn"	Shooter Jennings
2013	"The Other Life"	Shooter Jennings

== Filmography ==
Film
Year	Title	Role
2013	The Other Life	Himself
