= Floating on a Dream =

Studio album by Avi Kaplan
- Released: May 20, 2022
- Recorded: 2018–2022
- Genre: Americana
- Length: 43:21
- Label: Fantasy
- Producer: Shooter Jennings

Avi Kaplan chronology
| Lean on Me (2020) | Floating on a Dream (2022) |

Singles from Floating on a Dream
- 1. "First Place I Go" Released: November 21, 2021; 2. "All Is Well" Released: February 15, 2022

Floating on a Dream is the debut studio album by American singer-songwriter Avi Kaplan, released on May 20, 2022, through Fantasy Records. It is Kaplan's first studio album since his departure from the a cappella group Pentatonix in 2017. The album is entirely produced by Shooter Jennings, and features a guest appearance from Joy Williams.

== Background ==
On May 12, 2017, Avi Kaplan announced that he would be leaving the a cappella group Pentatonix after six years. In a video announcing his departure, Kaplan stated that although he enjoyed being in the group, he found it difficult to keep up with their schedule, which required him to spend less time with his family. His final show with the group was held at the Champlain Valley Fair in Essex Junction, Vermont, on September 3.

Before his announcement, Kaplan began releasing music as an independent artist under the name Avriel & the Sequoias. His debut solo project Sage and Stone was released on June 9, 2017. After leaving Pentatonix, Kaplan parted ways with their label RCA Records and continued to release solo music. On November 5, 2019, he announced his second solo project I'll Get By, which was scheduled to be released on January 24, 2020. Its release was delayed to February 28 due to Kaplan signing with Fantasy Records.

On November 15, 2021, Kaplan released the album's lead single "First Place I Go". He formally announced his debut studio album and released its second single, "All Is Well" featuring singer Joy Williams, on February 15, 2022.

== Critical reception ==
In a positive review, Mark Engleson of Entertainment Focus praised Kaplan's "incredible voice; it’s going to stand out on any project he does. His songwriting and the production here serve to bring out its deep emotional power, making a for highly listenable and enjoyable album."

== Track listing ==
All tracks are produced by Shooter Jennings.

| No. | Title | Writer(s) | Length |
|---|---|---|---|
| 1. | "First Place I Go" | Avi Kaplan; Trent Dabbs | 4:49 |
| 2. | "Floating on a Dream" | Kaplan; Kaleb Jones; Smith Curry | 3:59 |
| 3. | "On My Way" | Kaplan; Daniel Ellsworth | 3:40 |
| 4. | "He Don't Love You Right" | Kaplan; Ellsworth; Michał Nocny | 4:32 |
| 5. | "I'm Only Getting Started" | Kaplan; William Rinehart; Jeremy Lutito; Tim Burns | 4:01 |
| 6. | "Try to Get It Right" | Kaplan; Jones | 3:39 |
| 7. | "I Can't Lie" | Kaplan; Jones | 3:00 |
| 8. | "All Is Well" (featuring Joy Williams) | Kaplan; Joy Williams; Ellsworth | 2:57 |
| 9. | "Into the Blue" | Kaplan; Bill Reynolds | 4:14 |
| 10. | "When I'm a Fool" | Kaplan; Jones | 3:41 |
| 11. | "My Queen" | Kaplan; Jones | 4:43 |
| Total length: | | | 43:21 |

== Personnel ==
Credits adapted from Fantasy Records.

Musicians

- Avi Kaplan – vocals, guitar
- Aubrey Richmond – violin
- Chris Masterson – guitars
- Daniel Ellsworth – piano, organ, synthesizer
- Jamie Douglass – drums, percussion
- John Schreffler, Jr. – pedal steel
- Joy Williams – featured vocals (track 8)
- Kaleb Jones – guitar
- Smith Curry – pedal steel
- Ted Russell Kamp – bass

Technical

- Shooter Jennings – production
- David Spreng – recording, engineering
- Trina Shoemaker – mixing
- Pete Lyman – mastering

== Charts ==
Chart performance for Floating on a Dream
| Chart (2022) | Peak position |
|---|---|
| US Heatseekers Albums (Billboard) | 19 |
| US Top Album Sales (Billboard) | 57 |
