= New Stuff =

Compilation album by Waylon Jennings
- Released: November 24, 2017
- Recorded: 1998
- Studio: Southern Comfort (Nashville)
- Genre: Country
- Length: 36:07
- Label: Black Country Rock Media
- Producers: Waylon Jennings Shooter Jennings Josh Jennings Pete Lyman

Waylon Jennings chronology
The Lost Nashville Sessions (2016)	New Stuff (2017)	Songbird (2025)

New Stuff is a posthumous, physical release only album by American country music singer Waylon Jennings, released on Black Country Rock Media on Record Store Day, on November 24, 2017.

== Background ==
What was initially recorded as demo tapes in the 1998 in Waylon and Shooter Jennings' shared home studio, the album was recorded fully on cassette tapes by Waylon himself. The tapes featured only Jennings accompanied by an acoustic guitar alone on isolated tracks. Later on, Shooter, along with his cousin Josh Jennings, in 2017 would take these tapes and restore them, releasing the full 11 tracks on vinyl as a physical release only, with only 1,500 pressings being made.

== Track listing ==
All tracks are written by Waylon Jennings.

New Stuff track listing
No.	Title	Length
1.	"Good Time"	3:06
2.	"The Best Side of Me"	3:12
3.	"Changin' Baby's Mind"	3:00
4.	"World By the Tail"	3:44
5.	"Along for the Ride"	3:14
6.	"What Good Would It Do"	3:25
7.	"A Few Decembers Ago"	4:06
8.	"Here's to the Champion (Muhammad Ali)"	4:14
9.	"Mickey"	1:53
10.	"Billy, Whitey and Me"	3:24
11.	"Talk Good Boogie"	2:47
Total length:		36:07

== Personnel ==
Musicians

- Waylon Jennings – lead vocals, guitar

Technical

- Waylon Jennings – producer
- Shooter Jennings – executive producer
- Josh Jennings – assistance
- Pete Lyman – mastering

Visuals

- Shooter Jennings – creative director
- Keith Neltner – creative director, illustration, package design
