= Bad magic =

Bad magic or evil magic may refer to:

- Black magic, the use of supernatural magic for evil and selfish purposes

== Music ==
- Bad Magic Records, a British imprint of the Wall of Sound record label
- Bad Magic, a 2015 album by Motörhead
- Bad Magick: The Best of Shooter Jennings and the .357's, a 2009 album by Shooter Jennings
- "Bad Magick", a 2001 song by Godsmack
- "Bad Magick", a song by Shooter Jennings from his 2006 album Electric Rodeo
- "Evil Magic", a song by Fruit Bats from the 2012 album Space Ducks: Soundtrack

== Other uses ==
- Bad Magic (Pseudonymous Bosch), a 2014 novel by Pseudonymous Bosch
- Bad Magic, a 2023 graphic novel in the Skulduggery Pleasant novel series by Derek Landy
- "Bad Magic" (Ironheart), an episode of the Ironheart television miniseries

== See also ==
- Good magic (disambiguation)
