= Good magic =

Good magic may refer to:

- White magic, the use of supernatural magic for good and selfless purposes
- Apotropaic magic, a type of magic intended to turn away harm or evil influences
- Good Magic (foaled 2015), American Thoroughbred racehorse

== See also ==
- Bad magic (disambiguation)
