= Songbird (Waylon Jennings album) =

Studio album by Waylon Jennings
- Released: October 3, 2025
- Recorded: 1973–1984 (original recordings); 2024–2025 (additional overdubs)
- Studios: Initial recordings: Jack Clement (Nashville); American (Nashville); Pantheon (Arizona); Later overdubs: Sunset (Los Angeles); Infrasonic (Los Angeles)
- Genres: Country; outlaw country
- Length: 30:41
- Labels: Black Country Rock Media; Son of Jessi; Thirty Tigers
- Producers: Waylon Jennings; Richie Albright; Ken Mansfield; Shooter Jennings; Charley Crockett

Waylon Jennings chronology
New Stuff (2017)	Songbird (2025)	When the Balladeer Met the Dukes (2026)

Singles from Songbird
- 1. "Songbird" Released: June 15, 2025; 2. "The Cowboy (Small Texas Town)" Released: August 15, 2025

Professional ratings
Aggregate scores
Source	Rating
Metacritic	79/100
Review scores
Source	Rating
AllMusic	4/5 stars
The Arts Desk	4/5 stars
Mojo	3/5 stars
Record Collector	5/5 stars
Uncut	8/10

Songbird is the forty-seventh studio album by American country music singer Waylon Jennings, released on October 3, 2025 by Thirty Tigers and Son of Jessi. The release includes previously unreleased full-length songs recorded by Jennings along with the Waylors from 1973 to 1984, during the height of their careers.

== Recording ==
=== Remastering, mixing, and engineering process; and further production ===
In 2008, Shooter Jennings began the process of digitizing some of the audio files of the tracks featured on Songbird. Later in 2014, he would have a significant update further restoring the tracks, however with no actual digital alteration to any of the files. Up until the summer of 2024, he did not have the ability or time to fully access and explore the archives he had in his possession, therefore they remained unheard. What he would come to find, was hundreds of full-length and full band recordings of Waylon and the Waylors from a span of a little over a decade, during their downtime from touring. Using a 1976 DeMedio Custom API Console he had at his disposal at Snake Mountain studio (Sunset Sound Studio 3), he finished the tracks with fully analog production, and had very minimal production past what was already on the tapes.

=== Initial recording process ===
Track 2 on the album, "The Cowboy (Small Texas Town)", was recorded on April 13, 1978 during the I've Always Been Crazy sessions with two later overdubs by Fred Carter Jr. on guitar on April 14 and June 9 of that year. One other track was also recorded during these sessions, a cover of JJ Cale's "I'd Like to Love You Baby", the album's third track, being recorded in April 1978. It would later receive an overdub by Jessi Colter in December 1980.

== Release ==
On June 15, 2024, it was revealed by Shooter Jennings on social media that he had in his possession, a "treasure trove" of unreleased Waylon Jennings full-band and full-length recordings from the 1970s through the 1980s.

On June 11, 2025, the album's first single, a cover of Fleetwood Mac's "Songbird", was released via an unlisted YouTube video on the YouTube channel Wizard's Rainbow, Shooter Jennings' gaming channel. Along with the single's leak it was confirmed through the description of the video that two albums would directly follow this album at a later date, all being released under the Black Country Rock Media label through their Son of Jessi imprint, alongside Thirty Tigers.

On June 15 at midnight, the single was officially released to streaming, marking Waylon's first new solo batch of work released since 2012, and the album was put up for pre-save and pre-order.

On August 15, the album's second and final single, "The Cowboy (Small Texas Town)", co-written with fellow Texan Johnny Rodriguez, was released.

== Track listing ==
Songbird track listing
No.	Title	Writer(s)	Length
1.	"Songbird"	Christine McVie	3:40
2.	"The Cowboy (Small Texas Town)"	Waylon Jennings, Johnny Rodriguez	2:20
3.	"I'd Like to Love You Baby"	JJ Cale	2:50
4.	"I'm Gonna Lay Back with My Woman"	J.W. Routh	3:05
5.	"Wrong Road Again"	Allen Reynolds	2:31
6.	"I Hate to Go Searchin' Them Bars Again"	Isaac Payton Sweat	2:26
7.	"Brand New Tennessee Waltz"	Jesse Winchester	4:09
8.	"(I Don't Have) Any More Love Songs"	Hank Williams Jr.	2:47
9.	"After the Ball"	Johnny Cash	3:10
10.	"Dink's Blues"	Public domain	3:43

== Personnel ==
=== Musicians ===
- Waylon Jennings – lead vocals, guitar
- Ralph Mooney – pedal steel guitar
- Richie Albright – drums
- Tony Joe White – vocals, guitar
- Jessi Colter – vocals
- Barny Robertson – keyboards
- Carter Robertson – backing vocals
- Jerry "Jigger" Bridges – bass
- Sherman Hayes – bass
- Gordon "Crank" Payne – guitar
- Fred Carter Jr. – guitar
- Rance Wesson – guitar
- Steve Hardin – keyboards
- Gary Scruggs – guitar
- Randy Scruggs – guitar

==== Later overdubs ====
- Barny Robertson – piano, keyboards, Hammond B-3 organ
- Carter Robertson – backing vocals, humming
- Ashley Monroe – backing vocals (track 1)
- Elizabeth Cook – backing vocals (track 1)
- Shooter Jennings – piano
- Misty Brooke Jennings – tambourine

=== Technical ===
- Waylon Jennings – producer
- Richie Albright – producer
- Ken Mansfield – producer (tracks 7 and 10)
- Shooter Jennings – producer, engineer, mastering, mixing
- Charley Crockett – executive producer
- Nate Haessly – mixing, engineering assistance
- Pete Lyman – mastering
- Dan Bacigalupi – mastering assistance

=== Visuals ===
- Big Hassle Media – artwork
- Billy Mitchell – photography

== Charts ==
Chart performance for Songbird
Chart (2025)	Peak position
Norwegian Physical Albums (IFPI Norge)	10
Scottish Albums (Official Charts)	70
UK Americana Albums (Official Charts)	17
UK Country Albums (Official Charts)	1
UK Independent Albums (Official Charts)	32
US Billboard 200	116
US Americana/Folk Albums (Billboard)	8
US Independent Albums (Billboard)	18
US Top Country Albums (Billboard)	17
