= Duane Lundy =

American producer, sound engineer and musician

Duane Lundy is a producer, sound engineer, and musician based in Lexington, Kentucky. He is best known for his work with artists such as Jim James, Ringo Starr, Vandaveer, Sturgill Simpson (including with Sunday Valley), Ancient Warfare, Joe Pug, Ben Sollee, Miles Nielsen and the Rusted Hearts, and Justin Wells. Lundy has also worked with WUKY (Red Barn Radio), Young Mary Records, Colter Wall, Abby Hamilton, Bela Fleck, Shooter Jennings, Lance Rogers, Eric Bolander David Jameson, Ian Noe, and Justin Payne. He owns and operates the Lexington Recording Company (formerly Shangri-La Productions) recording studio in Lexington, KY, and is a partner in the WhiteSpace Records recording label.
