= Avi Kaplan =

American singer-songwriter (born 1989)

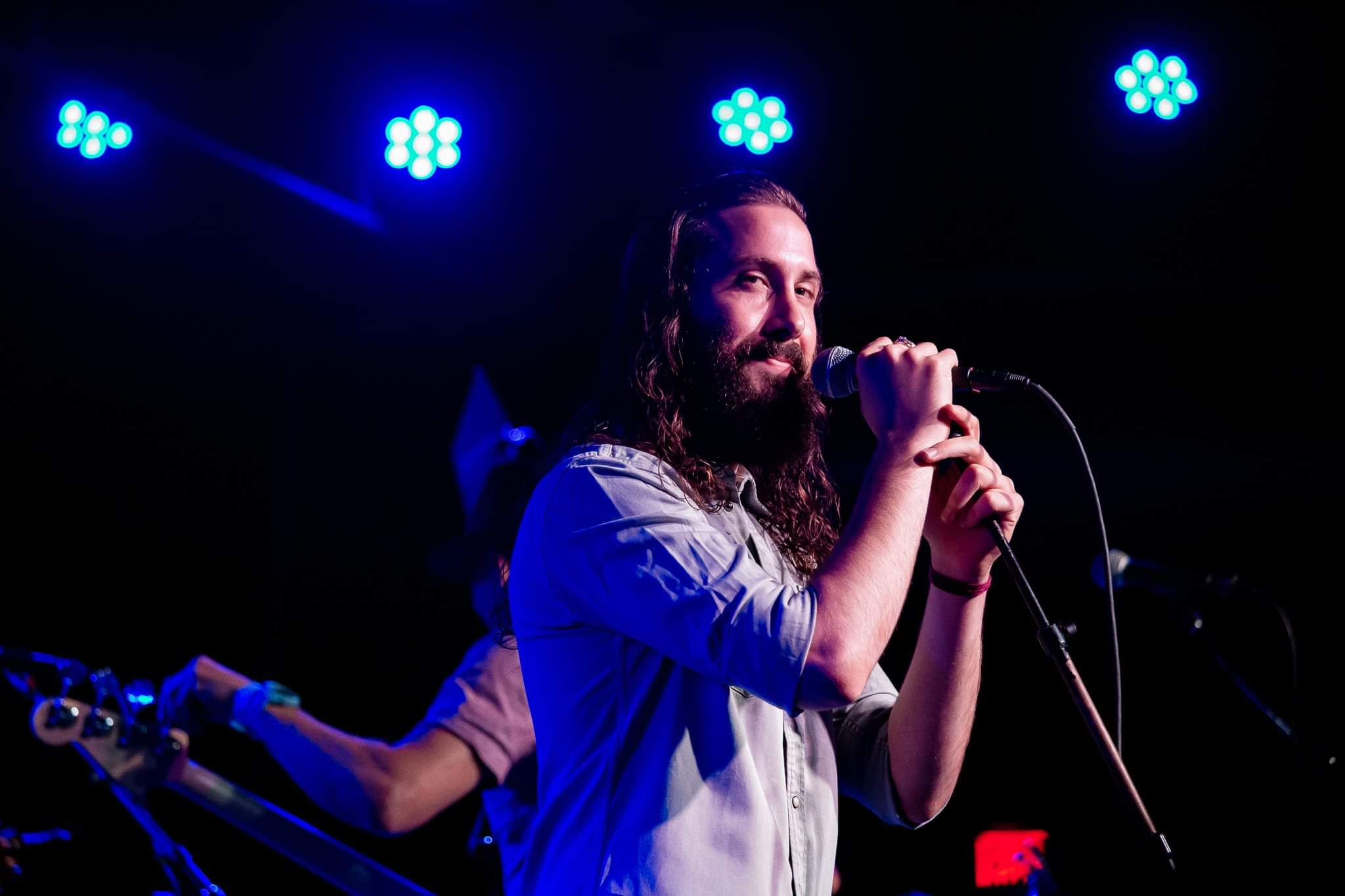
- Kaplan performing at The Ready Room in St. Louis on August 19, 2019
- Born: Avriel Benjamin Kaplan; April 17, 1989 (age 37); Visalia, California, U.S.
- Other names: Avriel & the Sequoias
- Education: Mt. San Antonio College
- Occupation: Singer-songwriter
- Years active: 2009–present
- Musical career
- Genres: Folk; a cappella; pop
- Instruments: Vocals; guitar
- Labels: Fantasy Records; Sequoia Summit Records; RCA; Madison Gate
- Website: avikaplanofficial.com

Avriel Benjamin Kaplan (born April 17, 1989) is an American singer-songwriter. He is known for being the former vocal bass of the a cappella group Pentatonix from 2011 to 2017. As a part of the group, he released five studio albums, won three Grammy Awards, and sold over six million albums.

In June 2017, Kaplan released his solo debut EP Sage and Stone under the name Avriel & the Sequoias. The EP served as his departure from the pop-based sounds of Pentatonix to folk-oriented styles. After retiring the stage name and signing with Fantasy Records, Kaplan released his second EP I'll Get By in February 2020. His debut studio album Floating on a Dream was released in May 2022.

== Early life and education ==
Avriel Benjamin Kaplan was born and raised in Visalia, California, on April 17, 1989. He has an older brother, Joshua, and an older sister, Esther Koop (née Kaplan), who was Pentatonix's tour manager for seven years. Kaplan is Jewish of Ukrainian and Russian descent, and was a victim of antisemitic bullying in his youth.

Kaplan loved folk music, and frequently went to the nearby Sequoia National Park, which became an inspiration for his music. He considers his earliest musical inspirations to be Simon & Garfunkel, John Denver, Crosby, Stills, Nash & Young, and Bill Withers. Later inspirations include Iron & Wine, Bon Iver, Ben Harper, and José González.

After graduating from Mt. Whitney High School, Kaplan attended Mt. San Antonio College, where he studied opera and choral studies. The college is known for its strong choral and a cappella programs.

== Career ==
=== Early career (2009–2011) ===
Before joining Pentatonix, Kaplan was already an accomplished a cappella artist, performing in the styles of jazz and opera among others. During his time in college, he joined the all-male a cappella group Fermata Nowhere. In 2009, the group became the first community college act to win the International Championship of Collegiate A Cappella (ICCAs). During the finals, he won the award for "Best Rhythm Section", making him the first vocal bass to receive the award. Before his victory, the award was called "Best Vocal Percussionist". In his junior year of college, he joined the vocal jazz ensemble Singcopation. In his first year as a member, the ensemble won the Monterrey Jazz Festival Competition.

=== Pentatonix (2011–2017) ===
Kaplan joined Pentatonix in 2011, when original members Kirstin Maldonado, Mitch Grassi and Scott Hoying were searching for a bass singer and a beatboxer. The group met the day before the auditions for the third season of The Sing-Off began. The group successfully auditioned for the show and eventually went on to win the season. Kaplan acted as the group's vocal bass, but frequently sang lead parts as well.

In 2014, Kaplan co-founded A Cappella Academy, a summer camp for 12–18 year-old kids to learn about a cappella music and performance.

During the 57th Annual Grammy Awards, Pentatonix won their first Grammy Award for Best Arrangement, Instrumental or A Cappella for their Daft Punk medley. They won the award again at the 58th Annual Grammy Awards for their rendition of “Dance of the Sugar Plum Fairy”. The group won their third Grammy Award for Best Country Duo/Group Performance at the 59th Annual Grammy Awards for their cover of "Jolene", which featured Dolly Parton.

=== Solo projects and Floating on a Dream (2017–present) ===
On April 29, 2017, Kaplan released his first solo song, "Fields and Pier", under the name Avriel & the Sequoias. His debut EP Sage and Stone was released on June 9.

On May 12, 2017, Kaplan announced that he would be leaving Pentatonix following their scheduled tour. In a video announcing his departure, he stated that although he loved being in the group, it was difficult for him to keep up with the group's demanding schedule, which required him to spend less time with his family. His final show with Pentatonix was held at the Champlain Valley Fair in Essex Junction, Vermont, on September 3.

Kaplan announced his first solo tour in October 2019. He announced his second EP I'll Get By on November 5. The project, originally scheduled to be released on January 24, 2020, alongside an accompanying tour, was postponed and later released on February 28 due to Kaplan signing to Fantasy Records.

On February 15, 2022, Kaplan formally announced his debut solo studio album Floating on a Dream, which was released on May 20. The album was produced by country musician Shooter Jennings. Kaplan released the album's lead single "First Place I Go" on November 12, 2021. Its second single, "All Is Well" featuring singer Joy Williams, was released alongside the album's announcement on February 15, 2022. The full album Floating on a Dream was released on May 20, 2022.

Kaplan and Shooter Jennings recorded the 4 episode commentary series Behind The Dream to accompany live recordings of "I'm Only Getting Started", "All Is Well", "I Can't Lie", and "When I'm A Fool" from the album Floating on a Dream at Sunset Sound Recorders.

Kaplan released his first song of 2025 "Peace Somehow" on February 21, 2025. During his 2025 tour for the release of his EP "Move Our Souls", Kaplan formed a backing chorus from local Portland, Oregon singers that he named the "Oregon Forest Choir". The group performed at Revolution Hall on April 18, 2025.

== Personal life ==
Kaplan resides in Nashville, Tennessee.

== Discography ==
=== Albums ===
==== Studio albums ====
List of studio albums and details
Title	Details	Peak chart positions	
Title	Details	US Heat.	US Sales
Floating on a Dream	Released: May 20, 2022; Label: Fantasy; Format: CD, LP, digital download, streaming	19	57

==== Extended plays ====
List of extended plays and details
Title	Details	Peak chart positions
Title	Details	US Sales
Sage and Stone (released as Avriel & the Sequoias)	Released: June 9, 2017; Label: Self-released; Format: Digital download, streaming	—
I'll Get By	Released: February 28, 2020; Label: Sequoia Summit, Fantasy; Format: CD, LP, digital download, streaming	64
Lean on Me	Released: August 21, 2020; Label: Sequoia Summit, Fantasy; Format: Digital download, streaming	—
Feel Alright	Released: April 12, 2024; Label: Fantasy Records; Format: CD, LP, digital download, streaming	—
Move Our Souls	Released: April 18, 2025; Label: Self-released; Format: Digital download, streaming	—
"—" denotes a recording that did not chart or was not released in that territory.

=== Singles ===
==== As lead artist ====
Title	Year	Album or EP
"Black Is the Color of My True Love's Hair" (with Peter Hollens)	2014	Peter Hollens
"Fields and Pier" (released as Avriel & the Sequoias)	2017	Sage and Stone
"Quarter Past Four" (released as Avriel & the Sequoias)	2017	Sage and Stone
"Hey Ya" (released as Avriel & the Sequoias)	2017	Non-album single
"Change on the Rise"	2019	I'll Get By
"Otherside"	2019	Non-album singles
"The Summit"	2019	Non-album singles
"Aberdeen"	2019	Non-album singles
"Get Down"	2019	Non-album singles
"I'll Get By"	2019	I'll Get By
"Lean on Me"	2020	Lean on Me
"Song for the Thankful"	2020	Non-album single
"First Place I Go"	2021	Floating on a Dream
"All Is Well" (featuring Joy Williams)	2022	Floating on a Dream
"I Can't Lie"	2022	Floating on a Dream
"On My Way"	2022	Floating on a Dream
"I'm Only Getting Started"	2022	Floating on a Dream

==== As featured artist ====
Title	Year	Album or EP
"Ring of Fire" (Home Free featuring Avi Kaplan)	2014	Crazy Life

== Tours ==
- Nashville Residency (2019)
- The Otherside Tour (2019)
- I'll Get By Tour (2020; cancelled due to the COVID-19 pandemic)
- European Tour (2022)
- Floating on a Dream Tour (2022)
- Feel Alright Tour (2024)

Touring members

- Daniel Ellsworth (piano, vocals)
- Jonathan Lister (drums, vocals)
- Jeremy Lister (guitar, vocals)
- Kaleb Thomas Jones (bass guitar, vocals)
- Noah Denney (drums, vocals)
- Dakota Holden (pedal steel guitar)
