= Live at Irving Plaza 4.18.06 =

Live album by Shooter Jennings
- Released: October 10, 2006
- Recorded: April 18, 2006
- Genre: Hard rock
- Length: 49:11
- Label: Universal South
- Producer: Dave Cobb

Shooter Jennings chronology
Electric Rodeo (2006)	Live at Irving Plaza 4.18.06 (2006)	The Wolf (2007)

Professional ratings
Review scores
Source	Rating
AllMusic	4/5 stars

Live at Irving Plaza 4.18.06 is an album by Shooter Jennings. It was released on October 10, 2006, on the Universal South label.

== Track listing ==
No.	Title	Length
1.	"Intro by Little Steven"	1:32
2.	"Electric Rodeo"	4:37
3.	"Gone to Carolina"	4:39
4.	"Busted in Baylor County"	4:52
5.	"Lonesome Blues"	4:03
6.	"Manifesto, No. 2"	3:26
7.	"Manifesto, No. 1"	4:34
8.	"Steady at the Wheel"	3:23
9.	"Southern Comfort"	5:50
10.	"It Ain't Easy"	2:58
11.	"Daddy's Farm"	9:17

== Personnel ==
- Shooter Jennings - guitar, lead vocals
- Ted Russell Kamp - bass guitar, backing vocals
- Bryan Keeling - drums
- LeRoy Powell - guitar, backing vocals
- Steven Van Zandt - guitar on "Intro by Little Steven"

== Chart performance ==
Chart (2006)	Peak position
U.S. Billboard Top Country Albums	55
