= Black Ribbons =

Studio album by Shooter Jennings
- Released: March 2, 2010
- Recorded: 2009
- Genres: Hard rock; industrial rock; progressive metal; stoner rock
- Length: 71:33
- Label: Black Country Rock
- Producer: Dave Cobb

Shooter Jennings chronology
The Wolf (2007)	Black Ribbons (2010)	Family Man (2012)

Singles from Black Ribbons
- 1. "Wake Up" Released: December 22, 2009

Black Ribbons is the fourth studio album by American musician Shooter Jennings. Released on March 2, 2010, the album marked a departure from Jennings's established Southern rock sound. It is a dystopian concept album and rock opera presented as the final free radio broadcast of a fictional disc jockey named Will 'o the Wisp (voiced by writer Stephen King), who, in defiance, plays the music of the fictional hard rock band Hierophant, whose music has been banned from airplay, on the evening before his radio station is to be taken over by the government to be used to air propaganda.

== Composition ==
=== Musical style ===
The music of Black Ribbons is a departure from Jennings's established Southern rock sound. The album has been classified as hard rock or heavy rock, industrial rock, psychedelic metal, progressive metal, progressive rock and stoner rock. Cited influences on the album's sound include Pink Floyd and Rage Against the Machine. Stephen Thomas Erlewine compared the album to a Nine Inch Nails retelling of Roger Waters' concept album Radio K.A.O.S. The website Bloody Disgusting said of the album's style, "Musically, Black Ribbons is a mind-blowing opus that completely obliterates genre distinctions. On this unprecedented work, twanging dobros coexist with Nintendo chipsets; brutally assaultive passages alternate with moments of unabashed tenderness, and surreal Floydian soundscapes float above smoking slabs of whiskey-soaked southern soul. It's an electrifying thrill ride across a dense, dark and gloriously decadent musical landscape."

=== Lyrics and themes ===
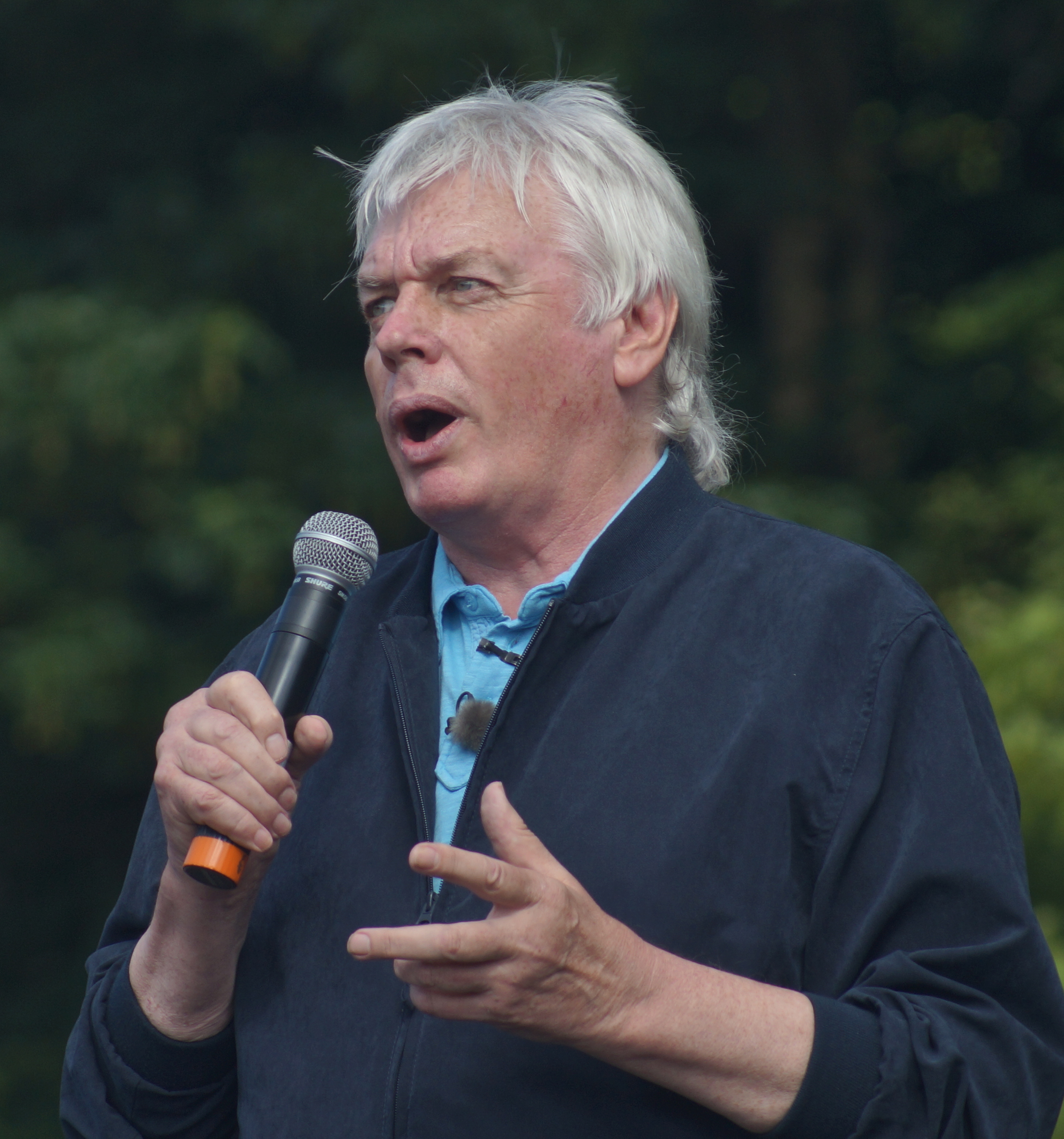
Conspiracy theorist David Icke was credited as an inspiration for the concept of Black Ribbons.

Black Ribbons is a concept album and rock opera set in a dystopian near future, presented as a broadcast by fictional disc jockey "Will 'o the Wisp", during his last night on the air before the U.S. Government takes control of the airwaves. He has vowed to play the one band the American government does not want him to play, Hierophant. According to Shooter Jennings, "I had this fictional band, and it was like wearing a mask of some sort. I was able to create this thing where I could be anything." Jennings said that conspiracy theorist David Icke was one of the inspirations for the album.

According to Jennings, "The whole album is kind of this big concept record about truth, and about the importance of love and two people connecting. It's masqueraded as this kind of futuristic story that goes on with this guy. As a whole, I believe it is something that is a really cool piece of art." Jennings told Billboard, "I've always been drawn to the darker side of things. When I was doing this record, I was reading a lot on everything, from past civilizations to government conspiracies to UFOs to the brief history of time to books on the occult. I was soaking up this dark counterculture of the world. We're in a very grim time. So I needed to paint the grim picture to let the colors of the positive message of the record shine."

Jennings told The Washington Post, "I think the whole thing is a metaphor for how hard it's been to get my voice heard. Whether it's a success or not, at the end of the day I know that I didn't play by anyone's expectations. This is the anti-expectations album."

In February 2009, it was announced that writer Stephen King would play a major role in the album. According to the Associated Press, "King is the voice of Will O' The Wisp, a radio talk-show host being phased out by government censorship. He spends his last hour on the air delivering a diatribe about the decline of America, and playing the music from a radical band, Hierophant."

Jennings also said King rewrote portions of the narration, saying "He took what I'd done, doctored it and made it his own. He threw in some awesome lines. That made me feel vindicated for any frustration I'd felt. It told me I really was on the right path."

King said, "It's a tremendously spooky idea. He sent me a draft, and it was just about perfect. I altered a few things and expanded some of it, but he knew exactly what he wanted. . . . To me, it was brilliant, the way the talk and the music weave in and out."

King is a fan of Jennings and even mentioned him in his novel Lisey's Story.

== Release ==
Professional ratings
Review scores
Source	Rating
Allmusic	2.5/5 stars
PopMatters	4/10 stars
No Depression	(no rating)

The album was released on March 2, 2010 on vinyl record, compact disc and as a digital download. In 2011, the album was reissued in an abridged "Bullet Version" which removed Stephen King's narration. The first single, "Wake Up", was released on December 22, 2009. To promote the album, Jennings was interviewed on conspiracy theorist Alex Jones' InfoWars program. The album sold less than Jennings's previous albums, which had been selling progressively worse with each release. However, one of the album's fans was Marilyn Manson, which led to the musician meeting Jennings in 2013 through Twiggy Ramirez, and later to Jennings collaborating with Marilyn Manson on a 2016 cover of David Bowie's song "Cat People (Putting Out Fire)" for Jennings's album Countach (For Giorgio), and Jennings producing Marilyn Manson's eleventh studio album, We Are Chaos, in 2020.

In 2016, a deluxe edition of Black Ribbons was released ahead of that year's presidential election, with Jennings telling Rolling Stone, "We’re pretty close to [the album's storyline] now. With the shootings of cops and of black people and the Trump versus the Clinton camps, we are very divided. And that's the way they like us. Divide and conquer, man. And one day the final executive order is going to be, 'Well, you people can't handle being around each other, so we're going to have to step in and set rules.' That's what Black Ribbons is about."

=== Critical reception ===
Although Stephen Thomas Erlewine described Black Ribbons as being "more exhausting than challenging" in his review for AllMusic, he said that "it's hard not to marvel at Jennings confidence [sic] in his Frankenstein metal-prog". Writing for PopMatters, Stephen Haag wrote that "Jennings seems, sadly, to have confused quantity with quality, and effort with execution. Black Ribbons is a mess." Writing for No Depression, Adam Sheets described Black Ribbons as being "just as much country as Taylor Swift or Rascall Flatts are and if given the choice I would much rather hear this on the radio", and said that Black Ribbons "may be the best concept album since Southern Rock Opera".

=== Chart performance ===
Chart (2010)	Peak position
U.S. Billboard 200	133
U.S. Billboard Top Independent Albums	16
U.S. Billboard Top Rock Albums	34

== Track listing ==
No.	Title	Writer(s)	performer	Length
1.	"Wake Up!"	Shooter Jennings		6:01
2.	"Last Light Radio 11:01 pm"		Stephen King	2:30
3.	"Triskaidekaphobia"	Shooter Jennings		3:10
4.	"Don't Feed the Animals"	Dave Cobb, Shooter Jennings		3:27
5.	"The Breaking Point"	Shooter Jennings		5:45
6.	"Last Light Radio 11:16 pm"		Stephen King	1:31
7.	"Everything Else is Illusion"	Shooter Jennings, Matt Whyte		3:35
8.	"God Bless Alabama"	Matt Reasor		3:31
9.	"All of This Could Have Been Yours"	Shooter Jennings		4:46
10.	"Last Light Radio 11:29 pm"		Stephen King	1:11
11.	"Fuck You (I'm Famous)"	Shooter Jennings		1:43
12.	"Lights in the Sky"	Shooter Jennings		5:11
13.	"Black Ribbons"	Shooter Jennings		4:21
14.	"Last Light Radio 11:41 pm"		Stephen King	1:34
15.	"Summer of Rage"	Shooter Jennings		5:39
16.	"California via Tennessee"	Ike Reilly		3:19
17.	"The Illuminated"	Shooter Jennings		4:54
18.	"Last Light Radio 11:57 pm"		Stephen King	1:08
19.	"When the Radio Goes Dead"	Ted Russell Kamp		5:07
20.	"All of This Could Have Been Yours (reprise)"	Shooter Jennings	Stephen King	3:10
Total length:				71:33

== Personnel ==
- Shooter Jennings – vocals, guitar, piano, drums, programming
- Dave Cobb – bass, guitar, keyboards, programming
- Ted Russell Kamp – acoustic guitar, bass, keyboards
- Bryan Keeling – drums
- Bobby Emmett – Hammond organ
- Jonathan Wilson – guitar
- Robby Turner – acoustic guitar, dobro
- Danny Coakley – backing vocals, clapping, stomping
- Jessi Colter – backing vocals
- Jennifer Davis – backing vocals
- Stephen King – Will 'o the Wisp (narrator)
- Mike Sportes – "Hierophant" drawing
