= Jon Hensley (radio personality) =

American radio personality (1983–2015)

- Born: Jonathan Lee Hensley; August 19, 1983; Muhlenberg County, Kentucky, U.S.
- Died: June 1, 2015 (aged 31); Bowling Green, Kentucky, U.S.
- Occupations: Radio host Manager
- Years active: 2002–2015
- Known for: Are You Ready for the Country? radio show
- Website: Official website

Jonathan Lee Hensley (August 19, 1983 – June 1, 2015) was an American radio personality and artist manager. Best known as the host of the nationally syndicated Are You Ready for the Country? radio program, Hensley interviewed more than a hundred celebrities and entertainers from the launch of his radio career in 2002 until his death in 2015.

== Biography ==
=== Early life ===
Hensley was born in Muhlenberg County, Kentucky, and graduated from Muhlenberg North High School. At the age of 14, Hensley created the company "Web Pages R Us" with classmate Brad Turner to raise money for them to attend a Tom Petty concert. Hensley attended ITT Technical Institute college for two years after high school, and began broadcasting music and interviews from his studio apartment while studying. The internet radio station, DarkSide of the Radio, launched Hensley's career in broadcasting, becoming a highly popular online radio station. Hensley was also a very close friend of the internet personality Angry Grandpa.

=== Commercial radio ===
After dropping out of college in 2003, Hensley launched his first commercial radio show titled Are You Ready for the Country?. The show was eventually syndicated and picked up by over 20 commercial radio stations across the country, and by the age of 25, Hensley had interviewed rock icons such as Chris Robinson, John Paul Jones, Porter Wagoner, Loretta Lynn, Merle Haggard and Kris Kristofferson on the show. The show became known for its diverse content and styles of music, steering clear of popular and current songs while including rock, blues, bluegrass, country and what Gram Parsons used to call "Cosmic American Music."

=== Manager ===
Hensley handled new media for a number of recording artists including Al Green and Percy Sledge. He also handled artist management and promotion for acts such as Mark Collie, Goose Creek Symphony, Shooter Jennings and Shane Tutmarc.

In 2005, Hensley began handling new media and online content/design for rockabilly pioneer Wanda Jackson. He played a role in helping raise awareness about Jackson not being a member of the Rock and Roll Hall of Fame, reaching out to Elvis Costello and Bob Dylan to see if they would help raise awareness of it. Costello complied by writing to the nomination committee, sparking a lot of interest for the campaign, while Dylan responded by questioning on-air why Jackson was not a member of the Hall of Fame during his popular radio show broadcast on SiriusXM. Following the successful attempt, Jackson was finally inducted in 2009.

Shortly after her induction, Jackson, her husband Wendell Goodman and Hensley were bouncing around ideas for a new recording project, deciding on an album made up of duets with other artists. One of the artists that Hensley reached out to was Jack White of The White Stripes, who accepted and offered to make the record on his Third Man Records label. The collaborative album, The Party Ain't Over, was eventually released in 2011.

=== Death ===
In the early hours of June 1, 2015, Hensley was found unresponsive in his bedroom by a friend staying at his house, and declared dead soon after. Toxicology results showed alcohol and Xanax in his system and were attributed to his death. He was 31 years old.
