= Ian Noe =

American singer-songwriter

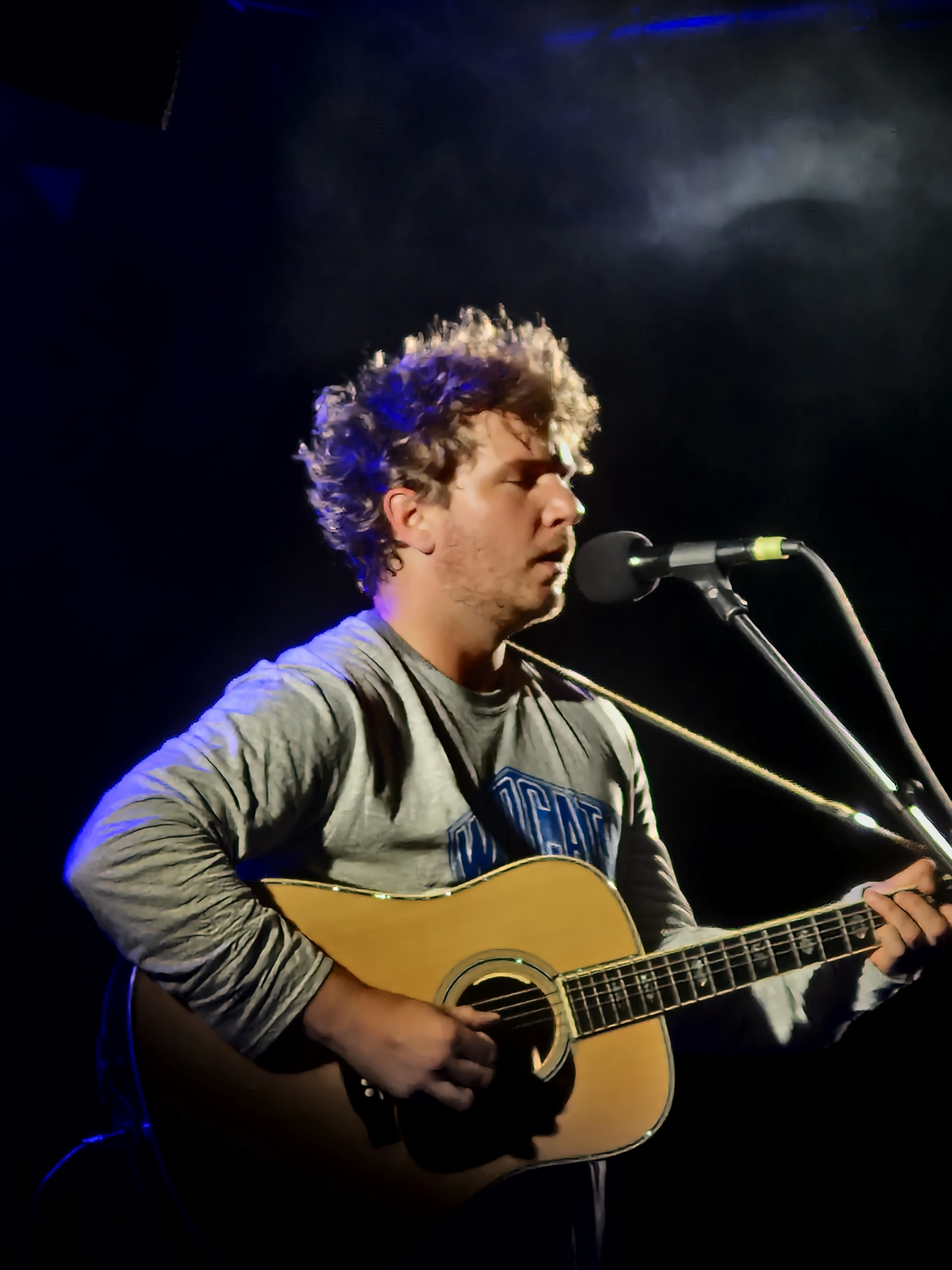
- Ian Noe in Stockholm 2025.

Background information
- Born: May 9, 1990 (age 36); Beattyville, Kentucky, U.S.
- Genres: Country folk, Americana
- Instruments: Vocals, guitar
- Label: Thirty Tigers
- Website: https://www.iannoe.com/

Ian Noe (born May 9, 1990) is an American singer-songwriter from Beattyville, Kentucky. Noe's debut album Between The Country was produced by Dave Cobb who plays guitar on the album, while Adam Gardner plays bass and organ piano.

In 2007, Noe won the grand prize in the Appalachian Starsearch in Hazard, Kentucky, with his original song Don't Let The Morning Bring Ya Down.

His subject matter includes death, addiction, lost love, and poverty.

Noe is featured performing several of his songs on a Jason Momoa video and he supported John Prine on tour in Germany, Sweden and Norway in 2019. Noe has also supported Son Volt, Jamestown Revival and Blackberry Smoke.

In June 2019 he was cover image of Spotify's Fresh Folk playlist.

== Discography ==
=== Albums ===
Title	Album details	Peak chart positions		Sales
Title	Album details	US Heat	US Indie	Sales
Between the Country	Release date: May 31, 2019; Label: National Treasury Recordings; Format: CD, vinyl, digital download	9	28	US: 2,400
River Fools & Mountain Saints	Release date: March 25, 2022; Label: Thirty Tigers	-	-	-
Canyon Falls Trailer Band	Release date: September 25, 2026; Label: Lock13 Records	-	-	-

=== EPs ===
Title	EP details	Peak chart positions		Sales
Title	EP details	US Heat	US Indie	Sales
Off This Mountaintop	Release date: 2017; Label: Silver & Gold Recordings; Producer: Duane Lundy	N/A	N/A	

== Links ==
- Official Website
- Ian Noe discography at Discogs
