= Hellbound Glory =

American country music group

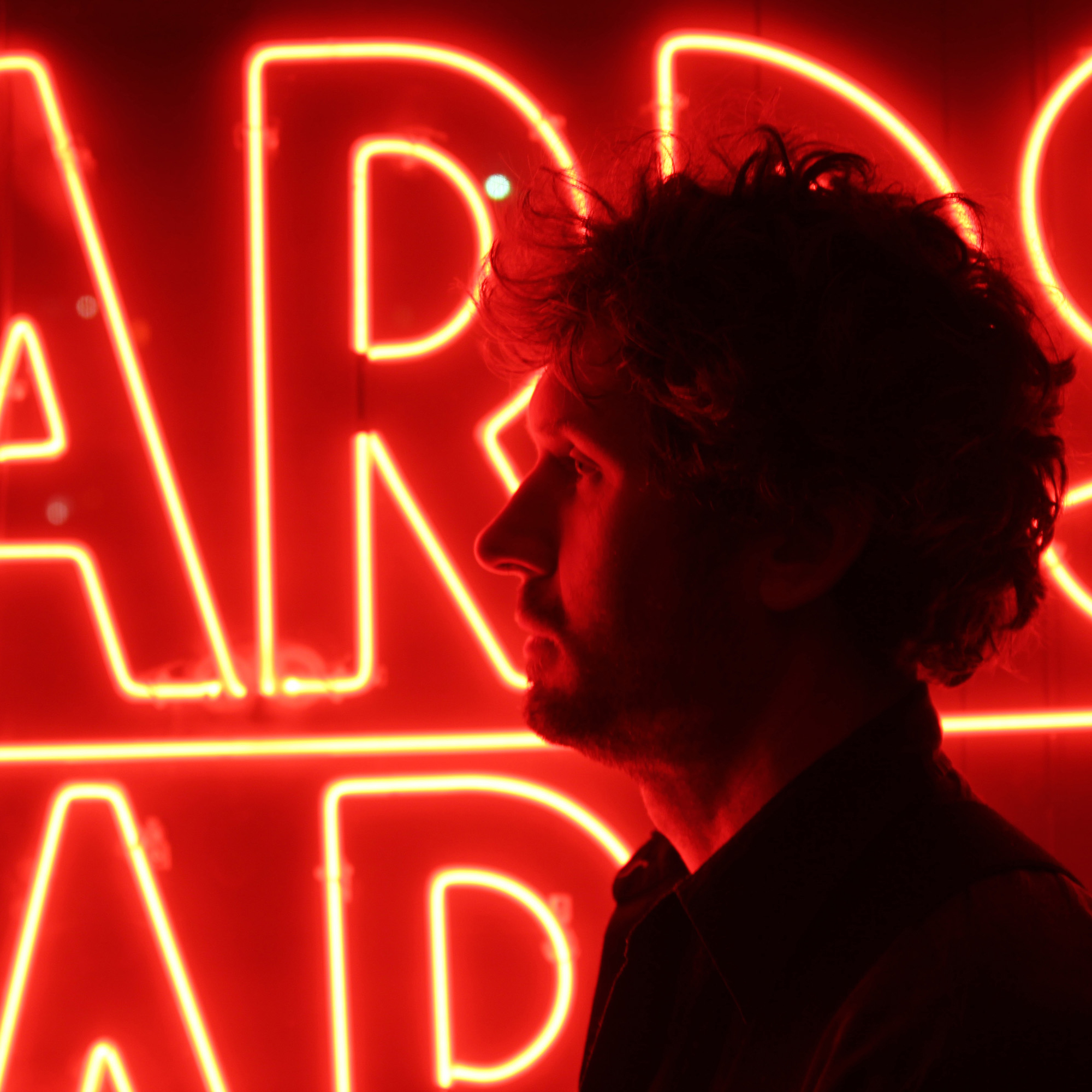
- Leroy Virgil of Hellbound Glory

Background information
- Origin: Reno, Nevada, United States
- Genres: Country; Roots rock
- Years active: 2005–present
- Label: Black Country Rock
- Members: Leroy Virgil; Chuck Bradley; Yotes
- Past members: Chad Kortan; Johnnie Fingers; Nick Swimley; Frank Medina; Zeke Wooldridge; TJ Byrnes; Francis Valentino; Adam Kowalski; Bård G. Faust Eithun; Andrew Barron; Eric Peterson; Bluesman Trent
- Website: www.hellboundglory.tumblr.com

Hellbound Glory is an American country and roots rock band formed in Reno, Nevada, in 2008 by singer-songwriter Leroy Virgil. The band has released seven studio albums.

== History ==
Hellbound Glory was founded in 2008 by frontman Leroy Virgil, four years after he moved from Aberdeen, Washington, to Reno, Nevada. Virgil has stated that Reno's nightlife inspired him to form the band, saying, "I grew up in a hick town by a lot of people's standards. Reno is just a hick town with taller buildings and brighter lights. Playing Reno is like playing a 24-hour dive bar. No matter where I play, I'm never too far from home."

Virgil describes the band's style as "Americana" and cites influences such as Hank Williams, Hank Williams Jr., and Nirvana.

== Touring and appearances ==
Hellbound Glory has toured extensively in North America and Europe. In 2012, the band performed on Kid Rock's Chillin' the Most cruise and in 2013 supported him on the Rebel Soul Tour (28 dates) alongside Buckcherry.

In 2013, the band opened for Kid Rock and ZZ Top as part of the "Best Night Ever" package at DTE Energy Music Theatre in Clarkston, Michigan.

Other notable tours include supporting Leon Russell in 2014 and opening for 10 Years on their acoustic tour.

In July 2023, Hellbound Glory toured in England.

== Discography ==
=== Scumbag Country (2008) ===
Described as displaying "clever lyrics, irresistible energy, and a sound that pays tribute to country music's past while still managing to sound modern," Hellbound Glory's debut album, Scumbag Country, was released in 2008.

=== Old Highs New Lows (2010) ===
Described as "drug-addled party of a record that succeeds by marrying boozy roadhouse charm with an unusually high standard of songcraft," Old Highs & New Lows was released in 2010.

=== Damaged Goods (2011) ===
Released in 2011, Damaged Goods has been described as an album whose characters "are people that are easy to relate to. Like many of us, they are trying their best to make the most of their lives, but despite their efforts, they seem destined to fail."

=== LV (2014) ===
LV is an EP released on May 13, 2014, recorded entirely at Oceanside Recording Studio in Aberdeen, Washington. Describing the new music, Virgil stated, "it's a little more stripped-down and acoustic just because that's what I wanted to do with this song. I would say it's a little bit deeper than some of my old stuff."

=== Pinball (2017) ===
Hellbound Glory's first release for Shooter Jennings's Black Country Rock label, Pinball was their first full-length album in six years. Initially Released in November 2017, it was re-released on Record Store Day 2018. The new release included "(Livin' That Way) You Better Hope You Die Young", recorded as a duet with Tanya Tucker.

=== Pure Scum (2020) ===
Produced by Jennings and recorded in L.A.'s Echo Park neighborhood, Pure Scum features eight new songs from Virgil with a couple rearrangements of traditionals.

=== Nobody Knows You (2022) ===
Again produced by Jennings and released on his Black Country Rock label, Nobody Knows You takes its name from a cover of the old blues standard "Nobody Knows You When You're Down and Out".

=== Undertow (2023) ===
In February 2023, Hellbound Glory flew to England to record a session with music producers Paul Gorry and George Shilling after they caught a show with Jennings and Virgil at the Whisky a Go Go in Hollywood. The first single from the session was released in July 2023 and was described as "not of this world". The recordings were influenced by Irish and British folk music, using Uilleann pipes and a string section.
