= Fifth on the Floor =

American country rock band

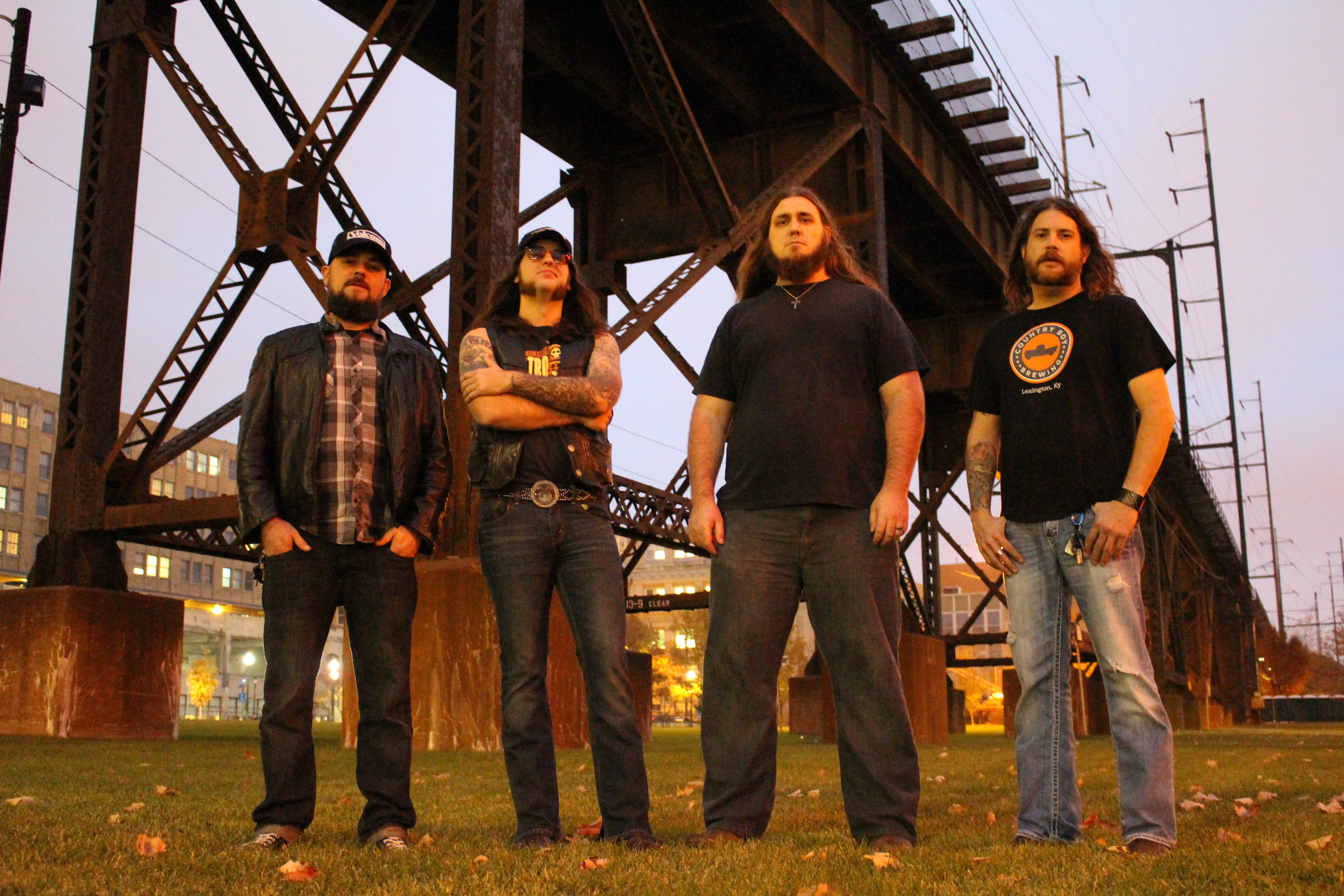
- Left to right: Kevin Hogle, Ryan Clackner, Justin Wells, Jason Parsons

Background information
- Origin: Lexington, Kentucky, United States
- Genres: Alternative country; Southern rock; country rock; outlaw country
- Years active: 2006–2015
- Labels: Black Country Rock/eOne Music
- Members: Justin Wells; Jason Parsons; Kevin Hogle
- Website: fifthonthefloor.com

Fifth on the Floor was an American country rock band formed in Lexington, Kentucky in 2006, and consisted of Justin Wells (vocals/guitars), Jason Parsons (bass/vocals), and Kevin Hogle (drums).

== History ==
The band formed in the summer of 2006. They released their independent debut album, The Color of Whiskey, in December, 2007. After writing a new batch of songs and touring throughout the Southern United States, the band released Dark and Bloody Ground in March 2010. The album received considerable radio play, including on Sirius Satellite Radio, the syndicated Nashville program Americana Carnival, and placed on WDVX (Knoxville, TN) DJ Red Hickey's "Best Albums of 2010." The band has played alongside multiple acts, including The Marshall Tucker Band, Shooter Jennings, Wanda Jackson, Cody Canada, Lucero, Jason and the Scorchers, Dale Watson, Blackberry Smoke, Jason Isbell & the 400 Unit, Reckless Kelly, Chris Knight, Whitey Morgan and the 78's, and Steepwater.

In 2011, Fifth on the Floor appeared on Southern Independent, Vol. 1, alongside Shooter Jennings, Drive-By Truckers, and Jimbo Mathus. Later that year, Fifth on the Floor released a video for the song "Distant Memory Lane" from Dark and Bloody Ground. The video was directed by Blake Judd of JuddFilms.

Fifth on the Floor went into the studio in January, 2012 to begin work on their third full-length record, Ashes & Angels. Shooter Jennings produced the record. Ashes & Angels was released on March 12, 2013, on Black Country Rock/eOne Music, and debuted at #64 on the Billboard Charts. The record was a joint release from the label alongside Jennings's upcoming record, The Other Life.

In 2015, the group disbanded, bookending their discography with a farewell EP, & After.

In 2016, Justin Wells released his debut solo album, Dawn in the Distance.

== Band members ==
- Justin Wells - vocals, guitars
- Kevin Hogle - drums
- Jason Parsons - bass, vocals

== Discography ==
Title	Album details	Peak positions
Title	Album details	US Country
The Color of Whiskey	Release date: December 4, 2007; Label: Independent	—
Dark and Bloody Ground	Release date: March 2, 2010; Label: SOL Records	—
Ashes & Angels	Release date: March 12, 2013; Label: Black Country Rock/eOne Music	64
& After EP	Release date: January 20, 2015; Label: Independent	—
"—" denotes releases that did not chart
