= Don Bowman =

Don Bowman may refer to:

- Don Bowman (politician) (1936–2013), Australian politician
- Don Bowman (singer) (1937–2013), American country music singer, songwriter, comedian and radio host
- Don "Sugarcane" Harris (1938–1999), American musician a.k.a. Don Bowman
- Don Bowman (judge) (1933–2022), Chief Justice of the Tax Court of Canada
