= Angry Grandpa =

American YouTube personality (1950–2017)

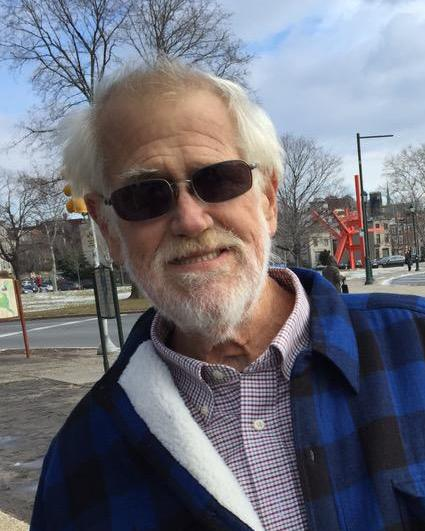
- Green in 2015
- Born: Charles Marvin Green Jr. October 16, 1950; Chatham County, Georgia, U.S.
- Died: December 10, 2017 (aged 67); Summerville, South Carolina, U.S.
- Children: 5

YouTube information
- Channel: TheAngryGrandpaShow
- Subscribers: 4.84 million
- Views: 1.87 billion
- Last updated: July 2025

Charles Marvin Green Jr. (October 16, 1950 – December 10, 2017), better known online as Angry Grandpa, was an American YouTuber. His videos have been featured on HLN's Dr. Drew, TruTV's Most Shocking, Rude Tube, and MTV's Pranked. Green's YouTube channel TheAngryGrandpaShow has amassed a total of 4.84 million subscribers and 1.87 billion views.

== YouTube career ==
Videos of Green under the moniker "Angry Grandpa", recorded by his son Michael, first started appearing on the internet in 2007. In the videos, which became known for its prank style, Green is seen reacting to his son's provocations by screaming profanities and destroying furniture, kitchen appliances, and technology. His commentary and over-the-top reactions to recent events and controversial topics have also garnered attention. While questions have been raised regarding the authenticity of the channel's content, including by fellow YouTuber Ray William Johnson, Green's son has credited his father's bipolar disorder for the rage-driven outbursts seen in the videos.

After gathering an audience on Break.com, Green migrated to YouTube and gained popularity there. Among Green's most popular videos are his reaction to the music video of Rebecca Black's single "Friday", which was featured on The Guardian's viral video chart in 2011, Green ripping up his son's WrestleMania tickets, destroying his son's PlayStation 4, smashing a television set during the Super Bowl 50 after being frustrated at the Carolina Panthers loss, and a prank causing him to hack at a durian with a Japanese sword. In another popular video format, Green's son is seen gifting his father, who until then had lived in a trailer park, a new house and a 1955 Chevrolet Bel Air, one like he owned in his youth, causing Green to react—by way of exception—with joy and gratitude. Green's videos have been a prominent source for the popular format YouTube poop.

In December 2015, Green released a cover of Waylon Jennings's "The Most Sensible Thing" in association with musician Shooter Jennings, who he had previously recorded videos with. As of December 2020, TheAngryGrandpaShow is still being operated by Green's son. The channel now mainly uploads posthumous videos that were produced before Green's death.

== Personal life and death ==
Green was born on October 16, 1950, in Chatham County, Georgia, to Dorothy Mayer and Charles Marvin Green Sr. He was raised in Charleston, South Carolina, in a low-income household. He worked a number of jobs, including as a firefighter and small business owner. He had been divorced twice and was the father of five children. As a parent and before his YouTube career, Green described himself as an "800 pound alcoholic and distant father". He stated that his celebrity status and his followers had given him renewed purpose in life. By 2015, Green was estimated to have been worth US$1.5 million.

Green had dealt with several medical conditions, including pneumonia, kidney stones, and skin cancer, the last of which had gone into remission. After collapsing at his son's Fourth of July party in 2017, Green was diagnosed with liver cirrhosis. Following months of deteriorating health, he died from the illness at his home on December 10, 2017, aged 67. Beside fellow YouTube personalities, condolences were sent by Roseanne Barr, Shooter Jennings, and Paul Heyman, the last of whom described him as a "YouTube pioneer".
