= Waylon Forever =

Studio album by Waylon Jennings
- Released: October 21, 2008
- Recorded: April 1998
- Genre: Outlaw country
- Length: 34:59
- Label: Vagrant
- Producer: Dave Cobb

Waylon Jennings chronology
Never Say Die: The Final Concert (2007)	Waylon Forever (2008)	Goin' Down Rockin': The Last Recordings (2012)

Alternative cover
- 2017 reissue cover

Professional ratings
Review scores
Source	Rating
Allmusic	2.5/5 stars
Country Universe	link

Waylon Forever is the forty-fifth studio album by Waylon Jennings which was released on October 21, 2008, on the Vagrant Records label. The backing band for this album is Waylon's son Shooter and his band, the .357's.

Waylon's first posthumous album reveals his final recordings of unheard material. Much of this album was recorded in the mid-to-late 1990s but was forgotten about until about 2007. Shooter and his band went in the studio to augment the original recordings. Dave Cobb produced.

The song "Outlaw Shit" is a reworked version of "Don't You Think This Outlaw Bit's Done Got Out of Hand".

== Track listing ==
1. "Jack of Diamonds" (Daniel Moore) – 3:41
2. "Outlaw Shit" (Waylon Jennings) – 5:30
3. "Ain't Livin' Long Like This" (Rodney Crowell) – 4:36
4. "Are You Ready for the Country?" (Neil Young) – 4:01
5. "Lonesome On'ry and Mean" (Steve Young) – 4:21
6. "Waymore's Blues" (Waylon Jennings, Curtis Buck) – 5:01
7. "White Room" (Jack Bruce, Pete Brown) – 4:26
8. "I Found the Body" (Waylon Jennings, Shooter Jennings) – 4:03

== Personnel ==
- David Campbell - string arrangements, conductor
- Jessi Colter - vocals
- Shooter Jennings - acoustic guitar, electric guitar, keyboards, vocals
- Waylon Jennings - acoustic guitar, electric guitar, vocals
- Ted Russell Kamp - banjo, bass guitar, bouzouki
- Bryan Keeling - cymbals, drums, percussion
- Leroy Powell - acoustic guitar, electric guitar, harmonica
- The Settles Connection - vocals
- Robby Turner - pedal steel guitar
- Lee Ann Womack - vocals

== Chart performance ==
Chart performance for Waylon Forever
Chart (2008)	Peak position
US Billboard 200	139
US Independent Albums (Billboard)	22
US Top Country Albums (Billboard)	28
