= Countach (For Giorgio) =

Studio album by Shooter Jennings
- Released: February 26, 2016
- Genre: Electronica
- Label: Black Country Rock
- Producer: Shooter Jennings

Shooter Jennings chronology
Don't Wait Up (For George) EP (2014)	Countach (For Giorgio) (2016)

Countach (For Giorgio) is the seventh studio album by Shooter Jennings, released on February 26, 2016 on vinyl through Jennings' own Black Country Rock label. A 16-bit music video for the song "Cat People (Putting Out Fire)" featuring Marilyn Manson was released on August 1.

== Composition ==
Countach is an album of songs composed or inspired by Italian producer Giorgio Moroder. Jennings has described the album as "a love letter to [his] childhood", explaining that "It all connected. Something that I had just written off as the sound of the Eighties, it was all Giorgio. He's the one that made that wave of music happen. It hit me like a freight train."

The recording sessions featured guest vocals from Steve Young, Brandi Carlile, Marilyn Manson and Shroud of the Avatar creator Richard Garriott de Cayeux, as well as his father Waylon Jennings on the 1st track entitled 'Loading' which itself is a never before heard, alternate take, of his 1978 single "Don't You Think This Outlaw Bit's Done Got Out of Hand", featuring a guitar riff believed to have been played by Tony Joe White.

== Release ==
The album was originally scheduled for release in November 2014. However, its release was delayed due to the sudden death of Jon Hensley, Jennings' longtime manager and friend and Black Country Rock co-founder. On February 22, 2016, the album was released digitally inside the multiplayer component of the role-playing video game Shroud of the Avatar: Forsaken Virtues, with players encouraged to search through the game's multiplayer levels to win one of 25 free vinyl copies of the album. The album was released on CD, digital download, 8-track tape and vinyl formats on March 11.

== Track listing ==
No.	Title	Writer(s)	Length
1.	"Loading"		0:47
2.	"Countach"		3:25
3.	"From Here to Eternity"	Giorgio Moroder; Pete Bellotte	4:28
4.	"I'm Left, You're Right, She's Gone"	Moroder; Bellotte	6:00
5.	"Born to Die" (featuring Steve Young)	Moroder; Bellotte	4:53
6.	"Chase" (featuring Richard Garriott de Cayeux)	Moroder	2:53
7.	"Love Kills"	Moroder; Freddie Mercury	5:02
8.	"The NeverEnding Story" (featuring Brandi Carlile)	Moroder; Keith Forsey	4:34
9.	"Cat People" (featuring Marilyn Manson)	Moroder; David Bowie	8:10

== Charts ==
Chart (2016)	Peak position
US Top Dance Albums (Billboard)	7
