= Daniel Ellsworth & The Great Lakes =

American indie rock band

Daniel Ellsworth and The Great Lakes (DE+TGL) is an American indie rock band formed in Nashville, Tennessee, in 2010. The band consists of Daniel Ellsworth (vocals, keys), Timon Lance (guitar), and Marshall Skinner (bass). The band tours extensively around North America and has released four studio albums, including two LPs and one EP: Kid Tiger, Civilized Man, Bemidji, and Fashion. Their two EPs are from an extended body of studio recordings, "Chapter One" and "Chapter Two." "Fashion" was released in 2018, followed by a number of digital singles. Their latest album, High Life was released due in 2024.

== History ==
=== Civilized Man (2011–2013) ===
In 2010, the band recorded their debut album Civilized Man, engineered and co-produced by Mark Nevers who has also worked with Will Oldham, Andrew Bird, Yo La Tengo and Lambchop. The album was recorded at Beech House Studios in Nashville, Tennessee in May 2011. This album includes a former member, Ricky Perry, on guitar. Perry left the band shortly after the release of the album.

Amazon MP3 named Civilized Man the number 76 album out of the top 100 albums of 2011. The online music retailer also named the band's single, "Shoe Fits," the number seven song of the 2011. In February 2012, Civilized Man charted on Billboard's Heatseeker's chart at position 18. Later that year, The Deli Magazine voted DE+TGL as Nashville's Best Emerging Artist of 2012.

=== Kid Tiger and Bemidji (2013–2016) ===
In May 2013, DE+TGL recorded their second full-length album at Sputnik Sound in Nashville, Tennessee. The album was recorded by Grammy Award winner Vance Powell, who has worked with Chris Stapleton, Kings of Leon, Jack White, and The White Stripes. While in studio, the band was featured in an article in Paste Magazine, including an interview and a write-up saying "There's very little you can guarantee in life, but one of the surer bets is that Daniel Ellsworth and The Great Lakes will make you dance." In anticipation of the Kid Tiger album, Esquire named DE+TGL one of their 15 Bands to Watch in 2014. Kid Tiger was released on March 4, 2014.

The songs on Kid Tiger and Bemidji, released March 7, 2015, were recorded in the same session with Powell. Songs on the Kid Tiger album were written in Nashville, while those on Bemidji were written at a remote cabin in Bemidji, MN. The album, Kid Tiger, is named after a fictitious character in Bob Dylan's book, Tarantula.

=== Chapter One and Chapter Two (2016) ===
While touring North America, DE+TGL played the Austin City Limits Music Festival in October 2016. During the winter, the band started working on a new collection of songs in Nashville's Elephant Lady Studio and Blackbird Studio, produced, engineered, and mixed by Kyle Andrews. The first single, "Paralyzed", was released on Friday, September 15, 2017. The second single, "Control" was released on October 20, 2017. EP "Chapter One" was released on January 19, 2018. EP "Chapter Two" was released on April 27, 2018, and featured in Billboard, Parade Magazine, Earmilk, Paste, Ones to Watch and Relix.

=== Fashion (2018–2019) ===
In 2018 the album Fashion was released. It was recorded at Nashville's Elephant Lady Studios with the help of Kyle Andrews.

In 2019 the band released the single "Way You Are (ft. Ruby Amanfu)".

=== High Life (2023) ===
High Life was recorded in Los Angeles. It was engineered, co-produced and mixed by Justin Glasco (known for work with Paris Paloma, Brett Dennen, The Lone Bellow). The single, "High Life," was released on October 24, 2023.

== Albums ==
- Civilized Man (2011)
- Kid Tiger (2014)
- Bemidji (2016)
- Fashion (2018)
- HIGH LIFE (2024)
