= The Wolf (Shooter Jennings album) =

Studio album by Shooter Jennings
- Released: October 23, 2007
- Recorded: March–July 2007
- Genre: Country
- Label: Universal South
- Producer: Dave Cobb

Shooter Jennings chronology
Live at Irving Plaza 4.18.06 (2006)	The Wolf (2007)	Bad Magick: The Best of Shooter Jennings and the .357's (2009)

Professional ratings
Review scores
Source	Rating
AllMusic	3/5 stars

The Wolf is the third studio album by Shooter Jennings, released in October 2007 on the Universal South Records label. Two singles were released from it: a cover of Dire Straits' "Walk of Life" and "This Ol' Wheel". A music video was also made for the single "Walk of Life".

== Track listing ==
All tracks are written by All tracks written by Shooter Jennings except where noted.

No.	Title	Writer(s)	Length
1.	"This Ol' Wheel"		3:44
2.	"Tangled Up Roses"		3:25
3.	"Walk of Life"	Mark Knopfler	3:58
4.	"Old Friend"		4:53
5.	"Slow Train" (feat. The Oak Ridge Boys)	Leroy Powell	3:41
6.	"Time Management 101"		2:45
7.	"Concrete Cowboys"		3:29
8.	"Higher"		3:21
9.	"Blood from a Stone"		3:05
10.	"Last Time I Let You Down"	Anthony Smith, Ted Russell Kamp	3:27
11.	"She Lives in Color"		3:19
12.	"The Wolf"		4:03
13.	"A Matter of Time"		6:04

== Personnel ==
- Shooter Jennings - drum loops, acoustic guitar, electric guitar, keyboards, sound effects, lead vocals, backing vocals
- Duane Allen - backing vocals on "Slow Train"
- Norah Lee Allen - backing vocals
- Jon Bonsall - backing vocals on "Slow Train"
- William Lee Golden - backing vocals on "Slow Train"
- Steve Herrman - trumpet
- Jim Horn - saxophone, horn arrangements
- Ted Russell Kamp - bass guitar, keyboards, backing vocals
- Bryan Keeling - castanets, drums, percussion
- Doug Kershaw - fiddle on "This Ol' Wheel"
- Paul Martin - backing vocals
- Gary Murray - banjo, fiddle
- Leroy Powell - 12-string guitar, acoustic guitar, electric guitar, pedal steel guitar, harmonica, slide guitar, backing vocals
- Charles Rose - trombone
- Kevin Sciou - electric guitar
- Calvin Settles - backing vocals
- Odessa Settles - backing vocals
- Sara Settles - backing vocals
- Shirley Settles - backing vocals
- Richard Sterban - backing vocals on "Slow Train"
- Todd Suttles - backing vocals
- Teresa Wilson - backing vocals

== Charts ==
Chart (2007)	Peak position
U.S. Billboard 200	52
U.S. Billboard Top Country Albums	12
