= Waymore's Outlaws =

American country band

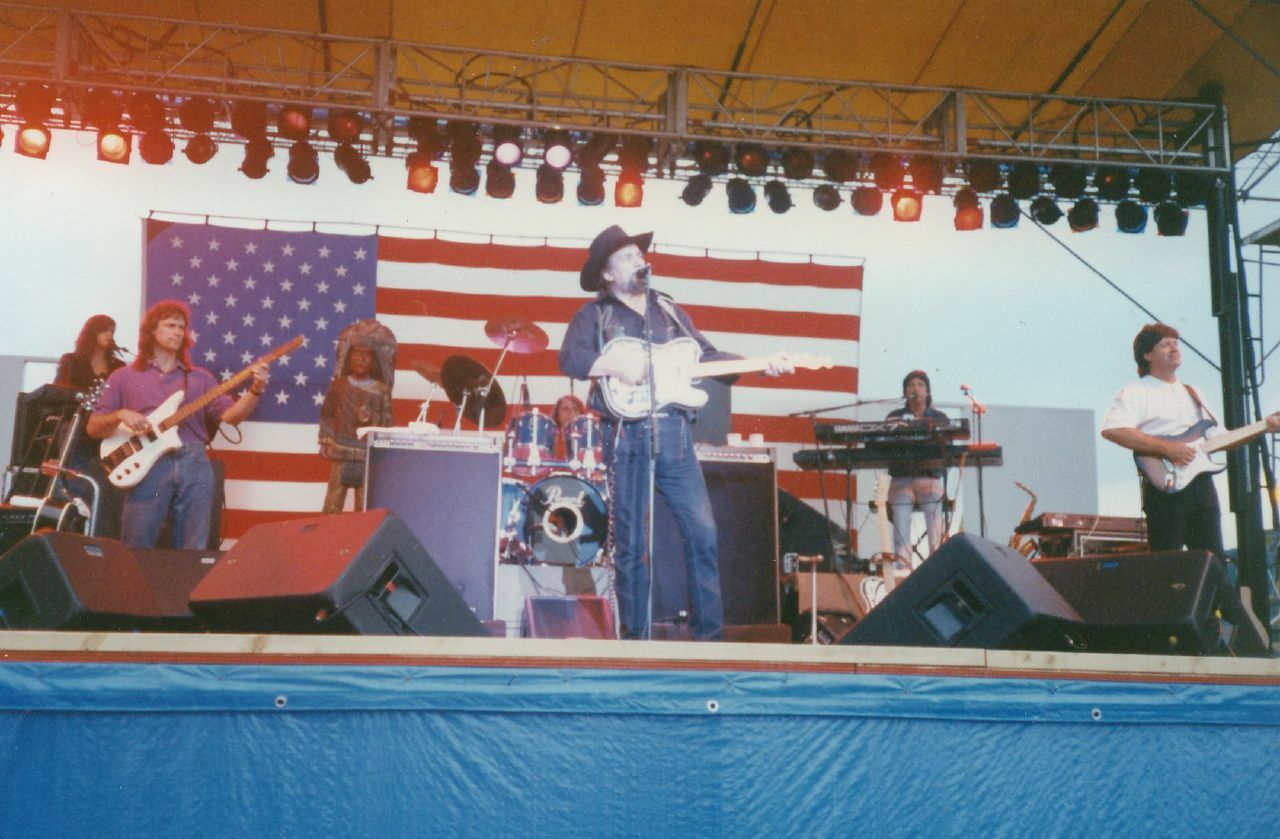
- Waylon Jennings and the Waylors at the Rocky Gap festival in 1991

Background information
- Origin: Phoenix, Arizona, U.S.
- Genre: Country
- Years active: 1961—2001, 2008–present
- Members: Jerry Bridges; Barny Robertson; Carter Robertson; Fred Newell; Tommy Townsend; Jeff Hale
- Past members: Waylon Jennings; Richie Albright; Tommy Jennings; Jerry Gropp; Billy Ray Reynolds; Larry Whitmore; Don Frank Brooks; Duke Goff; Ralph Mooney; Johnny Gimble; Wayne Moss; Paul Foster; Rance Wasson; Gordon Payne; Cliff Robertson; Reggie Young; Rick Gilbreath; Robby Turner

The Waylors, later Waymore's Outlaws, is an American country music band, best known as the backing and recording band of country music singer Waylon Jennings. Jennings formed the band in 1961, consisting of Jerry Gropp on the guitar and Richie Albright on the drums after moving to Phoenix, Arizona. The band earned a local fan base during its appearances on the night club JD's.

In 1965 RCA Records signed Jennings to a contract. The conservative restrictions of the producers of the label did not allow him to record with the Waylors, due to the Nashville custom of the time using session musicians instead of a performer's backup band. In 1972 he renegotiated his contract, and he included the Waylors for the first time on a RCA album in Honky Tonk Heroes. The lineup was expanded during the next decade, they backed Jennings until his death in 2002.

Reformed in 2008, the group performs on its own with Tommy Townsend as their lead vocalist, with occasional performances as the band for Albright's namesake, Waylon Albright "Shooter" Jennings, the son of Waylon Jennings and Jessi Colter.

== Background ==
Waylon Jennings was managed at the beginning of his career by Buddy Holly's first manager, 'Hi-Pockets' Duncan. On Duncan's recommendation, Holly hired Jennings to play electric bass for him during his "Winter Dance Party Tour" in 1959. After a show in Clear Lake, Iowa, Holly chartered a plane for himself, Allsup and Jennings to avoid a long bus trip to Fargo, North Dakota. This is because the tour organizers provided very inadequate transportation & the buses broke down in freezing weather. Jennings gave up his seat to J. P. Richardson, who was suffering from a cold and complaining about how uncomfortable a long bus trip was for a man of his size. During the early morning hours of February 3, 1959, later known as The Day the Music Died, the charter crashed outside Clear Lake, killing all on board. Jennings and Allsup continued the tour for two more weeks, featuring Jennings as the lead singer. When the tour ended, he returned to his DJ spot on KLLL and performed regionally.

== Phoenix and the Nashville sound ==
In 1961, Jennings lived briefly in Coolidge, Arizona working in radio, before moving to Phoenix, where he formed The Waylors, consisting of Jerry Gropp on the guitar and Richie Albright on the drums. Jennings and his band performed at a newly opened nightspot called JD's. The band earned a small fan base, eventually signing with the independent label Trend Records. In 1963, Jennings signed a contract with A&M Records. Jennings and The Waylors recorded an album on BAT called Waylon at JD's. Singer Bobby Bare, who covered Ian Tyson's "Four Strong Winds" and Jennings' "Just To Satisfy You", recommended Jennings to producer Chet Atkins, who signed Jennings to RCA Victor in 1965.

Jennings was accustomed to performing and recording with his own band, The Waylors, a practice that was discouraged or forbidden by powerful Nashville producers. Over time, however, Jennings felt limited by the Nashville sound's lack of artistic freedom. The music style publicized as "Countrypolitan" was characterized by orchestral arrangements, and the absence (or minor use) of traditional country music instruments. By 1972 he renegotiated his contract with RCA, that gave him complete creative control over his works. For the recording session, Jennings replaced the typical studio musicians of Nashville sessions with his band.

== Later years ==
By 1980, the lineup included the additions of Ralph Mooney from The Strangers, Rance Wasson, Gordon Payne, Jerry Bridges, Barney Robertson and Carter Robertson.

Mooney retired in 1996 and was initially replaced by Fred Newell, an established Nashville studio player, followed by Robby Turner, who Waylon first worked with as part of the Highwaymen touring band.

The band backed Jennings until 1999 when he formed a short-time project, The Waymore Blues Band, which was Jennings' "hand-picked dream team." Waymore Blues Band backed him until his death.

== After Waylon ==
Now known as Waymore's Outlaws, the band continues today, with Tommy Townsend as lead guitar and vocalist. In 2014, the Outlaws came full circle by playing with Waylon's son and Richie Albright's namesake Waylon Albright "Shooter" Jennings for the first time on tour.

The band announced their farewell tour for 2017 after having opened for Shooter Jennings for three years but continues to perform as of 2026.

In 2019, the band performed several songs at an event celebrating founding member Richie Albright at the Country Music Hall of Fame, as part of their "Nashville Cats" series of events celebrating Nashville country session and touring musicians.

On February 9, 2021, Albright died at the age of 81.

== Members ==
Current members

- Carter Robertson - backing vocals (1975-????, 2018–present)
- Barny Robertson - keyboards (1975-????, 2018–present)
- Jerry Bridges - bass
- Fred Newell - steel guitar, multi-instrumentalist
- Tommy Townsend – lead vocals, lead guitar (2008?-present)
- Jeff Hale - drums

Former members

- Waylon Jennings – lead vocals, guitars (1961-1999; died 2002)
- Jerry Gropp – rhythm guitar (1961-19??)
- Paul Foster – bass (1961-19??)
- Richie Albright – drums (1961-19??, 2013-2019; died 2021)
- Billy Ray Reynolds – harmony vocals, rhythm guitar (died 2019)
- Larry Whitmore – harmony vocals, rhythm guitar (died 2014)
- Don Frank Brooks – harmonica (died 2000)
- Duke Goff – bass
- Ralph Mooney – pedal steel guitar, dobro (1970–1996; died 2011)
- Johnny Gimble – fiddle (died 2015)
- Wayne Moss – guitar (died 2026)
- Rance Wasson – vocals, guitar
- Gordon Payne – rhythm guitar, harmonica (1975-198?; one-off in 2019)
- Cliff Robertson – keyboards
- Reggie Young – lead guitar (died 2019)
- Rick Gilbreath – keyboards (died 2017)
- Robby Turner – pedal steel guitar (died 2025)

== Bibliography ==
- Carr, Joseph; Munde, Alan (1997). Prairie Nights to Neon Lights: The Story of Country Music in West Texas. Texas Tech University Press. ISBN 978-0-89672-365-8.
- Everitt, Rich (2004). Falling Stars: Air Crashes That Filled Rock and Roll Heaven. Harbor House. ISBN 978-1-891799-04-4.
- Glaser, Dennis (2011). Music City's Defining Decade: Stories, Stars, Songwriters & Scoundrels of the 1970s. Xlibris Corporation. ISBN 978-1-4628-5767-8.
- Petrusich, Amanda (2008). It Still Moves: Lost Songs, Lost Highways, and the Search for the Next American Music. Macmillan. ISBN 978-0-86547-950-0.
- Reid, Jan (1976). "Who Killed Redneck Rock?". Texas Monthly. 4 (12). Emmis Communications. ISSN 0148-7736.
- Smith, John (1995). The Waylon Jennings Discography. 9780313297458.
- Shaver, Billy Joe; Reagan, Brad (2005). Honky Tonk Hero. University of Texas Press. ISBN 978-0-292-70613-2.
- Wolff, Kurt (2000). Duane, Orla (ed.). Country Music: The Rough Guide. Rough Guides Ltd. ISBN 978-1-85828-534-4.
