= Electric Rodeo (Shooter Jennings album) =

Studio album by Shooter Jennings
- Released: April 4, 2006
- Recorded: January 13, 2005 – October 15, 2005
- Genre: Southern rock; hard rock
- Length: 40:50
- Label: Universal South
- Producer: Dave Cobb

Shooter Jennings chronology
Put the "O" Back in Country (2005)	Electric Rodeo (2006)	Live at Irving Plaza 4.18.06 (2006)

Professional ratings
Review scores
Source	Rating
AllMusic	3.5/5 stars
Austin Chronicle	3/5 stars
Pop Matters	7/10 stars
Slant Magazine	1/5 stars
The Music Box	2.5/5 stars

Electric Rodeo is the second studio album by Shooter Jennings, released in 2006 on the Universal South label. It was recorded between January and October 2005 in various studios in and around Los Angeles, California, and Nashville, Tennessee.

== Composition ==
Electric Rodeo was recorded before Put the "O" Back in Country, but released as Jennings' second album.

The music of Electric Rodeo encompasses Southern rock, hard rock, arena rock, blues, blues rock, country rock, heavy metal, rock and roll, swamp rock and Texas blues.

== Track listing ==
No.	Title	Length
1.	"Electric Rodeo"	4:33
2.	"Gone to Carolina"	4:06
3.	"Some Rowdy Women"	3:13
4.	"The Song Is Still Slipping Away"	3:09
5.	"Hair of the Dog"	4:01
6.	"Little White Lines"	5:29
7.	"Alligator Chomp (The Ballad of Dr. Martin Luther Frog as Told To Tony)"	3:10
8.	"Manifesto No. 2"	2:09
9.	"Aviators"	3:23
10.	"Bad Magick"	5:12
11.	"It Ain't Easy"	3:05

== Personnel ==
- Shooter Jennings - guitar, lead vocals, backing vocals, Hammond organ, harmonica, piano, Wurlitzer
- Leroy Powell - guitar, backing vocals, slide guitar
- Ted Russell Kamp - bass guitar, backing vocals
- Bryan Keeling - drums, percussion
- Robby Turner - pedal steel guitar
- Bonnie Bramlett - backing vocals
- Gary Murray - fiddle

Technical

- Dave Cobb - producer
- Mark Rains - mixer
- James Minchin III - photographer

== Chart performance ==
Chart (2006)	Peak position
U.S. Billboard Top Country Albums	12
U.S. Billboard 200	64
