= Put the "O" Back in Country =

Studio album by Shooter Jennings
- Released: March 1, 2005
- Recorded: August–December 2004
- Genres: Country, Southern rock
- Length: 46:44
- Label: Universal South
- Producer: Dave Cobb

Shooter Jennings chronology
Put the "O" Back in Country (2005)	Electric Rodeo (2006)

Professional ratings
Review scores
Source	Rating
AllMusic	3.5/5 stars

Put the "O" Back in Country is the debut studio album by American country rock artist Shooter Jennings. This album was released on March 1, 2005 on the Universal South label.

This album produced Jennings's only entry on the Billboard Hot Country Songs charts in the single "4th of July". The album version of this song features a cameo appearance by George Jones, who sings the chorus to his signature song "He Stopped Loving Her Today" at the end; this guest appearance was removed from the song's radio edit. Despite the edit, Jones was credited on the Billboard charts.

== Composition ==
The music of Put the "O" Back in Country encompasses Southern rock, country rock and outlaw country.

== Track listing ==
All tracks are written by Shooter Jennings except where noted.

No.	Title	Writer(s)	Length
1.	"Put the 'O' Back in Country" (adapted from "Are You Ready for the Country" and arranged by Shooter Jennings, LeRoy Powell, Ted Russell Kamp)	Neil Young	3:25
2.	"4th of July" (feat. George Jones (additional writing credit goes to Bobby Braddock and Curly Putman for "He Stopped Loving Her Today"))		4:26
3.	"Lonesome Blues"	Powell	4:00
4.	"Solid Country Gold"		3:05
5.	"Busted in Baylor County (Sweet Leaf Version)"	Jennings, Powell, John Osbourne, Tony Iommi, Terence Butler, William Ward	3:53
6.	"Sweet Savannah"		4:09
7.	"Steady at the Wheel"	Kamp	2:57
8.	"Manifesto No. 1"		3:09
9.	"The Letter"		3:32
10.	"Southern Comfort" (feat. Faith Evans, Jessi Colter and CeCe White)	Jennings, Powell, Kamp	5:49
11.	"Daddy's Farm"		8:19

== Personnel ==
- Shooter Jennings – lead vocals, backing vocals, acoustic guitar, Dobro, electric guitar, grand piano, harmonica, Hammond organ, Wurlitzer
- Jessi Colter – backing vocals on "Southern Comfort"
- Faith Evans – backing vocals on "Southern Comfort"
- Eric Heywood – pedal steel guitar on "Solid Country Gold" and "Manifesto No. 1"
- George Jones – duet vocals on "4th of July"
- Ted Russell Kamp – bass guitar, piano, backing vocals
- Bryan Keeling – drums
- Chris Lawrence – pedal steel guitar on "Lonesome Blues"
- Travis Roy Parker – fiddle on "Busted in Baylor County"
- LeRoy Powell – lap steel guitar, acoustic guitar, electric guitar, 12-string guitar, slide guitar, banjo, Dobro, strings, harmonica, backing vocals
- CeCe White – backing vocals on "Southern Comfort"
- Hank Williams Jr. – backing vocals

== Charts ==
=== Weekly charts ===
Chart (2005)	Peak position
US Billboard 200	124
US Top Country Albums (Billboard)	22
US Heatseekers Albums (Billboard)	1

=== Year-end charts ===
Chart (2005)	Position
US Top Country Albums (Billboard)	55
