= Black Country Rock Media =

American record label

- Founded: 2010 (brand); 2013 (record label)
- Founder: Shooter Jennings
- Distributor: Rocket Science
- Country of origin: United States
- Location: Nashville, Tennessee; Los Angeles, California
- Official website: www.bcrmedia.com

Black Country Rock Media is an American independent multi-format record label owned by Shooter Jennings. Black Country Rock began in 2010 as a brand label for Shooter Jennings 2010 album Black Ribbons and evolved into a full record label with offices in Nashville, Tennessee and Los Angeles, California.

Black Country Rock media's official mission statement is that "BCR does not discriminate against formats and will release music, film and other creative projects by way of vinyl, compact disc, cassette tape, digital download, DVD, VHS and more. BCR fearlessly embraces and supports both the continuing accessibility of the technology of the present and also the preservation of tangible goods, no matter their age or obscurity."

== History ==
In October 2013 Jennings announced the formation of his new label and multi-format recording company, Black Country Rock.

== Imprints ==
=== Son of Jessi ===
In April of 2025, BCR founded their first imprint label, Son of Jessi, which would head the release of the 2025 Waylon Jennings album Songbird, as well as 2 albums following it later on with the second releasing in November 2026.

== BCR Concerts ==
Black Country Rock Media hosts concert nights called BCR Days or BCR Nights. The concerts usually feature Shooter among other artists both on the Black Country Rock Label such as Jessi Colter and off such as Billy Ray Cyrus. These concerts are typically for now held in the greater Los Angeles area.

== Artists ==
=== Current ===
- Billy Don Burns
- Jessi Colter
- Hellbound Glory
- Shooter Jennings
- Waylon Jennings
- Hank IV

=== Former ===
- Billy Ray Cyrus (2015)
- Last Daze (2014)
- Mick Foley (2014)
- Dennis Haskins (2015)
- Erik Shicotte (2021)
- Tommy Townsend (2018)
