= Shooter Jennings =

American musician and record producer (born 1979)

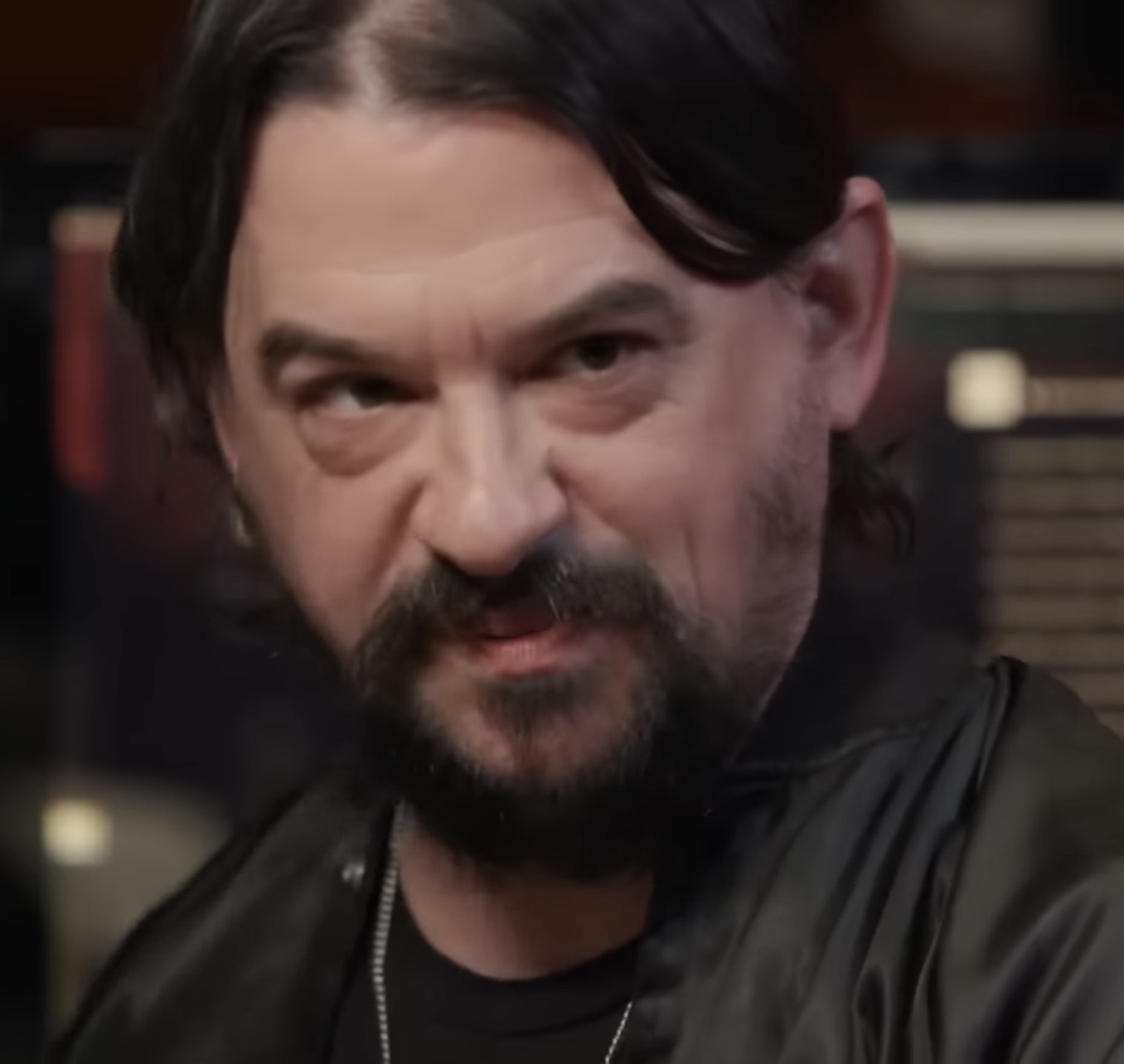
- Jennings in June 2026

Background information
- Born: Waylon Albright Jennings; May 19, 1979 (age 47); Nashville, Tennessee, U.S.
- Genres: Country rock; outlaw country; southern rock
- Occupations: Singer; musician; record producer; songwriter
- Instruments: Vocals; guitar; piano
- Years active: 1984–present
- Labels: Universal South; Black Country Rock Media; Low Country Sound
- Formerly of: Stargunn; The .357's; The Werewolves of Los Angeles
- Spouse: Misty Brooke Swain (m. 2013)
- Partner: Drea de Matteo (2001–2009)
- Children: 2
- Parent(s): Waylon Jennings; Jessi Colter
- Relatives: Tommy Jennings (uncle); Struggle Jennings (nephew)
- Website: shooterjennings.com

Waylon Albright "Shooter" Jennings (born May 19, 1979) is an American musician and record producer. He is the son of country singers Waylon Jennings and Jessi Colter. In a career spanning over four decades, Jennings has explored a variety of musical genres.

Jennings made his debut with the single "4th of July" of his 2005 album Put the "O" Back in Country on Universal South, which peaked at No. 22 on the Billboard country charts. Jennings has since followed with seven full-length studio albums: Electric Rodeo (2006), The Wolf (2007), Black Ribbons (2009), Family Man (2012), The Other Life (2013) Countach (For Giorgio) (2016), and Shooter (2018), in addition to a live album, a compilation, and numerous EPs.

== Early life ==
Jennings was born in Nashville, Tennessee, on May 19, 1979. There are two different accounts regarding how he got his nickname "Shooter." His mother cited her, and husband Waylon Jennings's, love of western culture and cowboy art for inspiring the gun-derived moniker. But his father said he came up with the name when, moments after the newborn emerged from his mother's womb, the boy sprayed a nurse before anyone could put on his first diaper. "I love my mom," says Jennings, "but I like Dad's version better. And I believe it's true. He didn't make [stuff] like that up."

In 1996, Jennings and his father recorded an album together. They called it Fenixon (a play on the words "phoenix" and "son") but could not find a label to distribute it.

== Career ==
=== Stargunn ===
In 2001, Jennings left Nashville, Tennessee, to seek his fortunes in Los Angeles. He assembled and performed with Stargunn, a rock band.

After the band's breakup, Jennings was twice presented with the opportunity to front the hard rock supergroup Velvet Revolver, but chose instead to pursue a solo career.

=== Black Ribbons ===
On May 1, 2010, Jennings announced "Black Ribbons: The Living Album" on his Twitter account.

=== Black Country Rock Media ===
In October 2013, Jennings announced the formation of his new label and multi-format recording company, Black Country Rock.

=== "George/Giorgio" releases ===
Towards the end of May 2014, Jennings announced his intention to release two EP's later in the year. Don't Wait Up (for George) is a tribute to his close friend and mentor George Jones, which was released in August 2014. Jennings's seventh studio album, Countach (For Giorgio), was originally scheduled to be released in November 2014, but its release was delayed due to the sudden death of Jon Hensley, Jennings's longtime manager and friend and Black Country Rock co-founder. A tribute to 1970s electronic-music pioneer and producer, Giorgio Moroder, the album was released on February 26, 2016, and features guest vocals from Steve Young, Brandi Carlile, Marilyn Manson and Richard Garriott de Cayeux. The album became his first to enter the Dance Albums chart, peaking at number seven there.

=== Radio show ===
Since 2005, Jennings has hosted "Shooter Jennings' Electric Rodeo" on SiriusXM Outlaw Country channel. The show's format primarily consists of country, rock, and outlaw music. It airs on Saturday night at 6–8 pm EST, with a replay on Sunday at 10–12 pm.

=== Production work ===
Together with Dave Cobb, Jennings produced Brandi Carlile's 2018 album By the Way, I Forgive You, which earned the Grammy Award for Best Americana Album at the 61st Annual Grammy Awards. The following year, Jennings teamed up with Carlile to co-produce Tanya Tucker's album While I'm Livin', which won the Grammy Award for Best Country Album at the 62nd Annual Grammy Awards.

Jennings collaborated as producer with Duff McKagan for his 2019 solo album, Tenderness. The album was recorded with Jennings' band, The Waters and The Suicide Horn Section, amongst others. In March 2019, a tour was announced in support of the album, featuring Jennings' band playing both the support slot as well as the headline slot as the backing band for McKagan.

Jennings produced Marilyn Manson's eleventh studio album We Are Chaos, released in September 2020.

Again with Dave Cobb, Jennings co-produced Carlile's 2021 album In These Silent Days, which won the Grammy Award for Best Americana Album at the 65th Annual Grammy Awards. Jennings and Carlile reunited to co-produce Tucker's 2023 album Sweet Western Sound. Also in 2023, Jennings produced the Turnpike Troubadours' comeback album A Cat in the Rain, their first record since 2017.

In 2022, Jennings announced he was stepping back from touring to focus full-time on production work. He subsequently co-produced a trilogy of albums for Charley Crockett on Island Records — Lonesome Drifter (2025), Dollar a Day (2025), and Age of the Ram (2026) — as well as the Turnpike Troubadours' The Price of Admission (2025).

Jennings produced Robert Randolph's solo debut Preacher Kids (2025) on Sun Records, which won the Grammy Award for Best Contemporary Blues Album at the 68th Annual Grammy Awards.

== Style and influences ==
Jennings' influences include David Bowie, Pink Floyd, Lynyrd Skynyrd, Hank Williams Jr., Nine Inch Nails, Guns N' Roses, Rage Against the Machine and Marilyn Manson.

Rolling Stone described Jennings as a "country-rock outsider". Regarding classification of his music, Jennings said that he did not want to be pigeonholed as being solely a rock musician. Marilyn Manson argued against Jennings's work being classified as country music, saying "southern" was a more appropriate classification, noting the latter "also drags in a bit of the Stones, in a way". AllMusic described Jennings as having "established himself as an artist who played by his own rules" and said that his music is "strongly informed by both hard rock and outlaw country", while his album Black Ribbons "explored his interest in metal and electronic music".

== Game design ==
Jennings has acknowledged being a "huge geek", and wanting to design computer games since his childhood. In 2009, he developed a Flash-based role-playing game as part of an interactive website for his album Black Ribbons. A Los Angeles Times reviewer noted Jennings was "clearly having fun" adapting the album's subject matter for the game.

The singer launched a bulletin board system called "Bit Sunrise" in 2014. The following year, he released his first BBS door game, From Here to Eternity, and promised to send 1 Bitcoin to the first player to complete the game.

Jennings described From Here to Eternity as "Zork meets Legend of the Red Dragon", and said that developing it was a healing experience for him after the death of his manager and partner Jon Hensley. The game features ANSI art by Luciano Ayres of the group Blocktronics.

== Personal life ==
Jennings is the son of country music singers Waylon Jennings and Jessi Colter. He has six half-siblings. His nephew is Struggle Jennings.

Jennings began dating actress Drea de Matteo in 2001. They have two children together, a daughter born in 2007 and a son born in 2011.

Jennings married long-time friend Misty Brooke Swain on June 4, 2013, in Joshua Tree, California.

== Discography ==
Studio albums

- Put the "O" Back in Country (2005)
- Electric Rodeo (2006)
- The Wolf (2007)
- Black Ribbons (2010)
- Family Man (2012)
- The Other Life (2013)
- Fenixon (with Waylon Jennings) (2014)
- Don't Wait Up (for George) EP (2014)
- Countach (For Giorgio) (2016)
- Shooter (2018)
- Sometimes Y (with Yelawolf) (2022)

== Production discography ==
Studio albums

- Waylon Forever - Waylon Jennings & The .357s (2008)
- Black Ribbons - Shooter Jennings & Hierophant (2010)
- Family Man - Shooter Jennings (2012)
- Dark and Dirty Mile - Jason Boland & The Stragglers (2013)
- Ashes & Angels - Fifth on the Floor (2013)
- The Other Life - Shooter Jennings (2013)
- Fenixon - Shooter Jennings and Waylon Jennings (2014)
- Live 55 — Waylon Jennings (2015)
- Symbols & Snares - Last Daze (2015)
- A Night in Room 8 - Billy Don Burns (2016)
- Countach (For Giorgio) - Shooter Jennings (2016)
- New Stuff — Waylon Jennings (2017)
- Pinball - Hellbound Glory (2017)
- By the Way, I Forgive You - Brandi Carlile (2018)
- Tenderness - Duff McKagan (2019)
- While I'm Livin' - Tanya Tucker (2019)
- Pure Scum - Hellbound Glory (2020)
- Lamentations - American Aquarium (2020)
- Neon Cross - Jaime Wyatt (2020)
- No Time For Love Songs - The Mastersons (2020)
- On the Widow's Walk - The White Buffalo (2020)
- We Are Chaos - Marilyn Manson (2020)
- Chasing Whiskey - Shooter Jennings, Jesse Dayton, Michael Devin & Matt Sorum (2021)
- In These Silent Days - Brandi Carlile (2021)
- The Light Saw Me - Jason Boland & The Stragglers (2021)
- Sometimes Y - Yelawolf & Shooter Jennings (2022)
- Floating on a Dream - Avi Kaplan (2022)
- No Regular Dog - Kelsey Waldon (2022)
- The Immortal Hellbound Glory: Nobody Knows You - Hellbound Glory (2022)
- Sweet Western Sound - Tanya Tucker (2023)
- Lonesome Drifter - Charley Crockett (2025)
- The Price of Admission - The Turnpike Troubadours (2025)
- Dollar a Day - Charley Crockett (2025)
- Songbird — Waylon Jennings (2025)
- Rise - Melissa Etheridge (2026)
- Age of the Ram — Charley Crockett (2026)
- Clovis — Charley Crockett (2026)
- Diamonds — Waylon Jennings (2026)

EPs and singles

- You Are My Sunshine - Jamey Johnson, Twiggy Ramirez & Shooter Jennings (2013)
- Don't Wait Up (for George) - Shooter Jennings (2014)
- Killing The Blues' - Billy Ray Cyrus (2014)
- Belding's Blues - Dennis Haskins (2014)
- The Most Sensible Thing - Angry Grandpa (2015)
- Mama's Don't Let Your Babies Grow Up To Be Cowboys - Lukas Nelson & Shooter Jennings (2015)
- A Civilized Hell - Lukas Nelson & Shooter Jennings (2016)
- Hey Mr. Nashville — Charley Crockett (2024)
- Bad Company — Charley Crockett (2025)

Mixing credits

- Tenderness (Album) - Duff McKagan (2019)
- Sinners, Saints & Fools - Brandi Carlile (2021)
- The Immortal Hellbound Glory: Nobody Knows You (Album) - Hellbound Glory (2022)
- Edge of Forever — Jessi Colter (2023)

== Filmography ==
Film
Year	Title	Role
2005	Walk the Line	Waylon Jennings
2006	American Revolutions: The Highwaymen	Himself
2013	The Other Life	The Gunslinger
Television
Year	Title	Role
2008	CSI: Crime Scene Investigation	Himself
2019	Marvel's The Punisher	Himself
2019	Squidbillies	Himself

== Awards and nominations ==
=== Grammy Awards ===
The Grammy Awards are awarded annually by the National Academy of Recording Arts and Sciences. Jennings has won four awards from seven nominations.

Year	Nominee / work	Award	Result
2019	By the Way, I Forgive You	Best Americana Album	Won
2019	By the Way, I Forgive You	Album of the Year	Nominated
2019	By the Way, I Forgive You	Record of the Year	Nominated
2020	While I'm Livin'	Best Country Album	Won
2022	"Right on Time"	Record of the Year	Nominated
2023	In These Silent Days	Best Americana Album	Won
2023	In These Silent Days	Album of the Year	Nominated
2023	"You and Me on the Rock"	Record of the Year	Nominated
2026	Preacher Kids	Best Contemporary Blues Album	Won
2026	Dollar a Day	Best Traditional Country Album	Nominated
