= With Our Arms to the Sun =

American band

- Origin: Arizona, United States
- Genres: Post-metal
- Years active: 2012–present
- Label: Fade to Silence Records
- Members: Josh Breckenridge; Joseph Leary; Joseph Breckenridge Jr.
- Past members: Brandon Pertzborn

With Our Arms to the Sun is an American post-metal band formed in Arizona in 2012. The band consists of Josh Breckenridge (vocals, guitar, noise), Joseph Leary (guitar), and Joseph Breckenridge Jr. (bass).

== History ==
Originally a solo demo project, Josh Breckenridge recorded an early draft of Delicate Union of Minds in his home studio. He approached his brother Joseph Breckenridge Jr. and childhood friend Joseph Leary to collaborate and the completed EP was released on social media in early 2013. They quickly followed up with the well received LP The Trilogy in August of the same year. The album featured cover art by Chet Zar. The band began touring regionally in the American Southwest and was featured on the score of the documentary Chet Zar: I Like to Paint Monsters.

With Our Arms to the Sun went back to the studio in early 2014 enlisting the help of Isis drummer Aaron Harris and film/television composer Jonathon Levi Shanes. The resulting album A Far Away Wonder gained high praise including nominations for Loudwire's Best Metal Song of 2014 for the single "Tessellation" and Best New Act of 2014. The band toured heavily through the remainder of 2014 and into 2015 supporting such acts as John 5, Doyle, Mushroomhead, and playing the Monster Mash Music Festival alongside Coheed and Cambria, Primus, and Tool. During this time, they signed with former Spitfire Records founder Paul Bibeau's new label Fade to Silence Records and gained an endorsement from Schecter Guitar Research.

Winter 2015 saw With Our Arms to the Sun return to the writing process, starting on their soon to be released LP Orenda. The forthcoming album was produced by Melvins frontman Buzz Osborne and will be supported by a headlining tour with Los Angeles based progressive rock band Socionic.

== Discography ==
- Delicate Union of Minds (EP, 2013)
- The Trilogy (2013)
- A Far Away Wonder (2014)
- Orenda (2017)
- The Mogollon Monster (2019)
