= Don't Chase the Dead =

2020 song by Marilyn Manson

Single by Marilyn Manson

from the album We Are Chaos
- Released: September 10, 2020
- Genre: Post-punk
- Length: 4:17
- Label: Loma Vista
- Songwriter(s): Marilyn Manson; Shooter Jennings
- Producer(s): Manson; Jennings

Marilyn Manson singles chronology
"We Are Chaos" (2020)	"Don't Chase the Dead" (2020)	"As Sick as the Secrets Within" (2024)

"Don't Chase the Dead" (stylized in all caps) is a song by American rock band Marilyn Manson, released on September 10, 2020 by Loma Vista Recordings as the second single from the band's eleventh studio album We Are Chaos. The single was issued as a one-track digital download a day ahead of the album's release. A music video for the song was directed by Travis Shinn, and featured actor Norman Reedus and Manson's wife Lindsay Usich. The track peaked at number 29 on Billboard's Mainstream Rock, making We Are Chaos the band's first studio album since 1998's Mechanical Animals to contain more than one top thirty single on that chart. It was the final single released by the band through Loma Vista before they were dropped by the label in February 2021 following accusations of abuse made against the band's vocalist, allegations he has denied.

== Composition and style ==
"Don't Chase the Dead" was the first song the band recorded for We Are Chaos. The track was written by Marilyn Manson and Shooter Jennings, and was recorded by the pair alongside drummer Jamie Douglass at Station House Studio, with Jennings saying the "bare bones" of the song were recorded in five hours. Originally written on a Gibson Hummingbird as an acoustic song, the track became predominantly electric during recording. The song was composed by Jennings using a driving-rhythm guitar line, although Manson said its chorus features "very Berlin-era Bowie elements. … Shooter and I both played guitar in the chorus, so we were making sort of a heterodyning element between [our] two instruments. So it sort of has this postulating feeling of unease but romance at the same time. And it almost sounds like what [the lyric is] saying. It sounds like the end of the world, in a way. That really was what I was trying to capture."

NME described the song as "thunderous", elaborating in their album review that it is "a rattling little desert rock beast, the kaleidoscop[e] lead by acoustic guitar, piano balladry and an almost doo-wop refrain and lighters-up chorus. It's clearly been touched by the influence of early '70s Bowie and a little bit of [Marc] Bolan – and then it all collapses into pure noise." Revolver said the track had an anthemic chorus, while Exclaim! said it was one of the most energetic songs the band had released "in years".

According to Ultimate Guitar, "Don't Chase the Dead" is written in the key of E minor and has an allegretto tempo of 114 beats per minute. The introduction consists of a repeated E minor pattern, followed by a sequence of Em–D5–C–Am7, which is repeated throughout the first verse and pre-chorus. The first chorus is made up of two sequences of G–D–Am–Em–C, followed by a D5–Em–D5–C–Am7 sequence. The Em–D5–C–Am7 sequence returns for a post-chorus break, and is repeated throughout the second verse. The second chorus repeats the same pattern as the first, but is followed by an abbreviated sequence of D5–Em. The middle eight repeats an E minor pattern, the final chorus consists of two repetitions of G–D–Am–Em–C, and the outro repeats the Em–D5–C–Am7 sequence.

== Release and promotion ==
On September 8, 2020, Manson stated he intended to create a music video for "Don't Chase the Dead", but that this may not be possible due to the restrictions put in place as a result of the COVID-19 pandemic. Two days later, the track was issued as a one-track digital download, a day ahead of the album's release. The music video for the song premiered on YouTube on September 24, 2020. Directed by Travis Shinn, it features Manson, actor Norman Reedus and Manson's wife Lindsay Usich. In the video, the three appear to be fleeing from a botched art heist. Manson, apparently stabbed during the heist, bleeds out in the backseat of the getaway car before Usich executes Reedus with a shot to the head. She then leaves both bodies in the car in a darkened alleyway. Soon after the video was released, it was revealed that Manson and Usich married in a private ceremony while in lockdown.

"Don't Chase the Dead" spent three months on Billboard's Mainstream Rock, reaching a peak of number 29 on the chart dated January 16. This made We Are Chaos the band's first studio album since 1998's Mechanical Animals to contain more than one top thirty single on that chart, following the top ten peak of the title track the previous October. The song abruptly fell off the chart on February 9, the week after Manson was accused of abuse by Evan Rachel Wood and several other people, allegations which he denied. The song subsequently became their final release issued by Loma Vista, as the band was dropped by the label soon after the allegations were publicized.

== Personnel ==
Credits adapted from Tidal

Marilyn Manson

- Marilyn Manson – songwriter, vocals, guitar, producer
- Paul Wiley – guitar
- Juan Alderete – bass guitar
- Brandon Pertzborn – drums

Guest musicians

- Shooter Jennings – songwriter, guitar, producer
- John Schreffler – pedal steel guitar
- Ted Russell Kamp – bass guitar
- Jamie Douglass – drums
- Aubrey Richmond – fiddle
- David Spreng – recording
- Mark Rains – recording

== Charts ==
Chart (2020–2021)	Peak position
US Alternative Digital Songs (Billboard)	15
US Hot Hard Rock Songs (Billboard)	5
US Hot Rock Digital Songs (Billboard)	13
US Hot Rock & Alternative Songs (Billboard)	49
US Mainstream Rock (Billboard)	29
