= Tomorrow We Escape =

Studio album by Ho99o9
- Released: September 9, 2025
- Length: 36:01
- Label: Deathkult; Last Gang
- Producer: Charles Caste; Frances Caste; Hafiz Durham; Elete; Sam Matlock; Tim Randolph; Aaron Rays; Charlie Russell; David Sitek; Yung Skrrt

Ho99o9 chronology
Skin (2022)	Tomorrow We Escape (2025)

Tomorrow We Escape is the third studio album by American punk rap duo Ho99o9. It was released on September 9, 2025, via Deathkult and Last Gang.

== Reception ==
Professional ratings
Aggregate scores
Source	Rating
Metacritic	83/100
Review scores
Source	Rating
Beats Per Minute	78%
Distorted	8/10
DIY	4.5/5 stars
Dork	4/5 stars
Kerrang	4/5
The Line of Best Fit	8/10

Ed Lawson of DIY gave it a 4.5-star rating, calling it "a record that makes the outfit's already fiery flame burn yet brighter." In a 8/10 review for The Line of Best Fit, John Amen noted the release as "perhaps the grittiest and least satirical album in the Ho99o9 discography," stating "With Tomorrow We Escape, Ho99o9 remain uncompromising, railing against familial, cultural, and governmental hypocrisies."

Giving it a 4/5 rating for Dork, Harry Shaw referred to it as "a declaration of survival, rage and identity. It doesn't just work, it hits like a detonation." Kerrang!'s James Mackinnon called it "their most mature and focused album yet," assigning it a score of 4/5.

Reviewing for Distorted, Gavin Brown gave it a 8/10 rating and described it as "another essential collection that contains all the riot starting mayhem we love from HO99O9 but this time round, they demonstrate an even more eclectic side to their music, and one that shows maturity too." Referring to it as the group's "most vulnerable and exposed album to date", Sydney Peterson of Beats Per Minute remarked, "Tomorrow We Escape sees Ho99o9 infuse an ethereal, melancholy softness into a sound they'd already established and mastered."

== Track listing ==
Tomorrow We Escape track listing
No.	Title	Writer(s)	Producer(s)	Length
1.	"I Miss Home" (featuring MoRuf)	Lawrence Eaddy; Jean Lebrun; Adedayo Adewunmi; Yohance Wright	Elete	2:22
2.	"Escape"	Eaddy; Lebrun; Matthew Cooper	Yung Skrrt	3:06
3.	"Target Practice"	Eaddy; Lebrun; Sam Matlock; Charlie Russell	Matlock; Russell	2:11
4.	"OK, I'm Reloaded"	Eaddy; Lebrun; Tim Randolph	Randolph	2:58
5.	"Psychic Jumper"	Eaddy; Lebrun; Aaron Rays	Rays	2:28
6.	"Incline" (featuring Nova Twins, Pink Siifu, and Yung Skrrt)	Eaddy; Lebrun; Cooper; Amy Love; Livingston Mathews; David Sitek; Georgia South	Sitek	3:39
7.	"Upside Down"	Eaddy; Lebrun; Cooper	Yung Skrrt	3:22
8.	"Tapeworm" (featuring Greg Puciato)	Eaddy; Lebrun; Charles Caste; Frances Caste; Greg Puciato	C. Caste; F. Caste	4:12
9.	"Immortal" (featuring Chelsea Wolfe)	Eaddy; Lebrun; C. Caste; Hafiz Durham; Chelsea Wolfe	C. Caste; Durham	4:44
10.	"LA Riots"	Eaddy; Lebrun; C. Caste; F. Caste	C. Caste; F. Caste	3:02
11.	"Godflesh"	Eaddy; Lebrun; C. Caste	C. Caste	3:53
Total length:				36:01

== Personnel ==
Credits adapted from Tidal.

=== Ho99o9 ===
- Jean Lebrun – vocals on all tracks except "I Miss Home"
- Lawrence Eaddy – vocals on all tracks except "I Miss Home"

=== Additional contributors ===
- Trayer Tryon – mixing
- MoRuf – vocals on "I Miss Home"
- David Sitek – drums, guitar, and programming on "Incline"
- Nova Twins – vocals on "Incline"
- Pink Siifu – vocals on "Incline"
- Yung Skrrt – vocals on "Incline"
- Brandon Pertzborn – drums on "Tapeworm"
- Greg Puciato – vocals on "Tapeworm"
- Chelsea Wolfe – vocals on "Immortal"
