= We Are Chaos (song) =

2020 single by Marilyn Manson

- Cover art for the 7" vinyl edition

Single by Marilyn Manson

from the album We Are Chaos
- Released: July 29, 2020
- Genre: Glam rock
- Length: 4:05
- Label: Loma Vista
- Songwriters: Marilyn Manson; Shooter Jennings
- Producers: Manson; Jennings

Marilyn Manson singles chronology
"The End" (2019)	"We Are Chaos" (2020)	"Don't Chase the Dead" (2020)

Music video
- "We Are Chaos" on YouTube

"We Are Chaos" (stylized in all caps) is a song by American rock band Marilyn Manson, released on July 29, 2020, through Loma Vista Recordings as the lead single from their eleventh studio album of the same name. The song was written and produced by Manson and Shooter Jennings; Jennings wanted the song to sound like the music of Jeff Lynne and Elvis Presley. "We Are Chaos" received generally positive reviews upon release, with numerous publications comparing it to the work of The Beatles. It was also a commercial success, entering the top five of numerous music download and airplay charts, and was their third top ten hit on Billboard's Mainstream Rock Chart. A music video for the song was created by Matt Mahurin, which featured Manson's likeness being inserted into a series of surrealistic vignettes.

== Composition and style ==
"We Are Chaos"
A 30-second sample of the first bridge and chorus of "We Are Chaos"

The song was written by Marilyn Manson in collaboration with Shooter Jennings. The lyrics contain political and religious references, but the song was primarily inspired by Manson "thinking about how I can relate to the rest of the world, emotionally and mentally, and not dwelling on politics or religion so much." He said that although the track was written before the COVID-19 pandemic, its lyrics could be conflated with the pandemic; he argued that lockdown would have a severe impact on mental health while saying "being kept indoors for so long can really work at someone's emotions and their soul, and test their strength in a lot of ways." The primary guitar used to record the track was an acoustic guitar tuned to Nashville tuning, which was doubled during recording by Jennings. He said the Nashville tuning "kind of adds that Jeff Lynne vibe. It was brought in to bring that Elvis meets Jeff Lynne vibe. Nashville tuning gives you the glimmer but you don't have that whole fucking hippy, '60s peace thing going on."

== Critical reception ==
Numerous publications compared the track to the work of The Beatles, with Kerrang! specifically comparing it to the song "Across the Universe". DIY said "We Are Chaos" was inspired by The Beatles' "brand of cathartic melancholia", describing it as a significant departure for Marilyn Manson and "an anarchic listen, but perhaps not in the way you are expecting." A staff writer for Sputnikmusic said the track was an homage to two of the band's biggest influences: the Beatles and David Bowie. They elaborated that those two acts had been a primary influence on Manson's work since the 1998 album Mechanical Animals, and noted the track "perfectly displays the kind of duality the Beatles' sound is so well known for: it's an out of character set-piece teeming with optimism, juxtaposed with Manson's analytical motif about humanity's imminent doom." Kerrang! complimented the song for being simultaneously apocalyptic and romantic, and said it was impossible to ascertain the sound of the parent album by listening to the song, writing: "For now, it's enough of a clue to know that what Marilyn Manson has in store is going to be something on a grand scale, and with a sense of class only he can unlock."

Along with DIY, BrooklynVegan described the song as a power ballad, "but in the brooding, creepy way that only Marilyn Manson would do a power ballad. Not bad at all." Consequence of Sound complimented the track for being more acoustic than their earlier work, describing it as "both melodic and heavy at the same time. There's almost a pop quality to the song, but the macabre nature of the lyrics and vocals still make it very much a Marilyn Manson tune." Other publications complimented the quality of the song's composition, with Idolator describing it as an unusually accessible and melodic track when compared with the rest of the band's discography. USA Today said its lyrics were "signature Manson", while American Songwriter said the chorus was "among the most visceral, primal expressions of inner turmoil since the unchained desperation of... 'Smells Like Teen Spirit'. Manson's lyric, not unlike [Kurt] Cobain's, shows us a world in which reason, logic and hope have been abandoned and lost."

== Release and promotion ==
A music video for "We Are Chaos" premiered on YouTube on July 29, 2020. It was directed, photographed and edited by Matt Mahurin while in quarantine due to the COVID-19 pandemic. Using computer-generated imagery and chroma key technology, Mahurin inserted Manson's likeness into a series of surrealistic vignettes. The video features scenes such as Manson's brain being examined with a microscope, and his brain being distilled into a "chaos pill" which is then placed on a disembodied tongue to create an army of clones rising from graves in a cemetery.

The song was released as a one-track digital download on July 29, as the lead single from the album. A limited edition 7" vinyl single was available with pre-orders of the album at Loma Vista's web store. The single was limited to 4,000 copies worldwide, and contained an exclusive B-side—a remix of the song created by Jennings. "We Are Chaos" debuted at number thirty on the US active rock radio format on August 10, as the highest new entry that week. It went on to peak at number eight on the chart dated October 24, when it was broadcast 1,208 times to over 2.35 million people. On the mainstream rock format, the song peaked with 1,083 plays and a measured broadcast audience of 1.717 million on October 24. The track peaked at number 8 on Billboard's Mainstream Rock, the band's third top ten hit on that chart.

== Track listing ==
All tracks are written by Marilyn Manson and Shooter Jennings.

Digital download
No.	Title	Producer(s)	Length
1.	"We Are Chaos"	Jennings; Manson	4:00

7" vinyl
No.	Title	Producer(s)	Length
1.	"We Are Chaos"	Jennings; Manson	4:05
2.	"We Are Khaos" (Remix)	Jennings; Manson	4:36

== Personnel ==
Credits adapted from Tidal

Marilyn Manson

- Marilyn Manson – songwriter, vocals, producer, artwork
- Paul Wiley – guitar
- Juan Alderete – bass guitar
- Brandon Pertzborn – drums

Guest musicians

- Shooter Jennings – songwriter, guitar, producer
- John Schreffler – pedal steel guitar
- Ted Russell Kamp – bass guitar
- Jamie Douglass – drums
- Aubrey Richmond – fiddle
- David Spreng – recording
- Mark Rains – recording

== Charts ==
Chart (2020)	Peak position
Canada Active Rock (Billboard)	31
France (SNEP Sales Chart)	118
Czech Rock Songs (ČNS IFPI)	5
German Alternative Singles (Deutsche Alternative Charts)	1
New Zealand Hot Singles (RMNZ)	33
US Alternative Digital Songs (Billboard)	12
US Hot Rock & Alternative Songs (Billboard)	45
US Hard Rock Digital Songs (Billboard)	1
US Hot Hard Rock Songs (Billboard)	4
US Hot Rock Digital Songs (Billboard)	4
US Mainstream Rock (Billboard)	8
US Rock Airplay (Billboard)	26
