= United States of Horror =

Studio album by Ho99o9
- Released: May 5, 2017
- Genres: Hip-hop; electronic; industrial; hardcore punk
- Length: 46:03
- Label: Deathkult
- Producers: Cameron Bartolini; Brain Orchestra; Paul Giese; Eric Hoegemeyer; Killer B; Soraya LaPread; David Andrew Sitek; Ultragash; Yeti

Ho99o9 chronology
United States of Horror (2017)	Skin (2022)

Professional ratings
Aggregate scores
Source	Rating
Metacritic	78/100
Review scores
Source	Rating
AllMusic	3.5/5 stars
Clash	8/10
DIY	4/5 stars
Drowned in Sound	8/10
Kerrang!	4/5 stars
The Line of Best Fit	7.5/10
Loud and Quiet	8/10
Metal Hammer	3.5/5 stars
Mojo	4/5 stars
Pitchfork	6.7/10

United States of Horror is the debut studio album by American hip-hop duo Ho99o9. It was released on May 5, 2017, via Deathkult Records.

== Track listing ==
United States of Horror track listing
No.	Title	Writer(s)	Producer(s)	Length
1.	"U.S.H."	Jean Lebrun; Lawrence Eaddy	Tizhimself	0:18
2.	"War Is Hell"	Lebrun; Eaddy; David Sitek	Sitek	3:25
3.	"Street Power"	Lebrun; Eaddy; Ian Longwell; Eric Rogers	Longwell	3:25
4.	"Face Tatt"	Lebrun; Eaddy; Sitek	Sitek	2:06
5.	"When Death Calls (Interlude)"	Lebrun; Paul Giese	Giese	1:20
6.	"Bleed War"	Lebrun; Eaddy; David Sprecher; Gerard Powell; Oliver Murphy	Yeti; Tizihimself; Killer B	2:15
7.	"Moneymachine"	Lebrun; Eaddy; Soraya LaPread	LaPread	3:15
8.	"Splash"	Lebrun; Eaddy; Cameron Bartolini	Bartolini	2:50
9.	"Knuckle Up"	Lebrun; Eaddy; Longwell; Mark Solomich	Longwell; Solomich	3:58
10.	"Dekay" (featuring Gnar)	Lebrun; Eaddy; Hunter Pradat; Brennan Gervassi	Ultragash	3:25
11.	"Sub-Zero"	Lebrun; Eaddy; Bartolini; Nick Long; Brandon Pertzborn	Bartolinni	2:14
12.	"Feels Like (Interlude)"	Lebrun; Eaddy	Brain Orchestra	1:25
13.	"City Rejects"	Lebrun; Eaddy; Sitek	Sitek	2:33
14.	"Hydrolics"	Eaddy; Lebrun; Sprecher; Powell	Yeti; Powell	3:46
15.	"New Jersey Devil"	Bartolini; Long; Pertzborn; Eaddy; Lebrun	Bartolini	2:05
16.	"United States of Horror"	Lebrun; Eaddy; Sitek	Sitek	4:16
17.	"Blaqq Hole"	Lebrun; Eaddy; Eric Hoegemeyer	Hoegemeyer	3:27

=== Note ===
- "United States of Horror" is titled "U.S.H." on physical editions.

== Personnel ==
Credits adapted from the album's liner notes.

=== Ho99o9 ===
- TheOGM – vocals, album art, art direction
- Yeti Bones – vocals, album art, art direction

=== Additional contributors ===
- Francis Caste – mixing, mastering
- Clovis XIV – mixing, mastering
- Richard Impaglia – album art, art direction
- Jeff Matz – layout, design
- Mike Feinberg – executive production

== Accolades ==
Publication	Accolade	Rank	Ref.
Kerrang!	Kerrang!'s Albums of 2017	40	
Loud and Quiet	Top 40 Albums of 2017	38	
