= Skin (Ho99o9 album) =

Studio album by Ho99o9
- Released: March 11, 2022
- Genres: Nu metal; experimental hip-hop; industrial
- Length: 33:08
- Labels: DTA; Elektra
- Producers: Ho99o9; Travis Barker (also exec.)

Ho99o9 chronology
United States of Horror (2017)	Skin (2022)	Tomorrow We Escape (2025)

Singles from SKIN
- 1. "Battery Not Included" Released: January 20, 2022; 2. "Nuge Snight" Released: February 11, 2022

Professional ratings
Aggregate scores
Source	Rating
Metacritic	81/100
Review scores
Source	Rating
Beats Per Minute	75%
Blabbermouth	8/10
Clash	7/10
DIY	4/5 stars
Kerrang!	4/5 stars
The Line of Best Fit	8/10
NME	4/5 stars

Skin is the second studio album by American rap rock duo Ho99o9. It was released on March 11, 2022, by DTA Records.

== Track listing ==
All tracks are written by Ho99o9.

No.	Title	Lyrics	Length
1.	"Nuge Snight"		1:31
2.	"Battery Not Included"		2:53
3.	"Bite My Face"	Ho99o9; Corey Taylor	3:06
4.	"Slo Bread"	Ho99o9; Bernard Freeman	4:22
5.	"Protect My Bitch Pt. 2"		1:51
6.	"...Speak of the Devil"		2:35
7.	"Skinhead"	Ho99o9; Saul Williams	3:54
8.	"Lower Then Scum"		1:17
9.	"Devil at the Crossroads"		3:29
10.	"the World, the Flesh, the Devil"		2:20
11.	"Limits"	Ho99o9; Malachi-Phree Pate	2:53
12.	"Dead or Asleep?"		2:52
Total length:			33:08
