= Ho99o9 =

American punk rap group

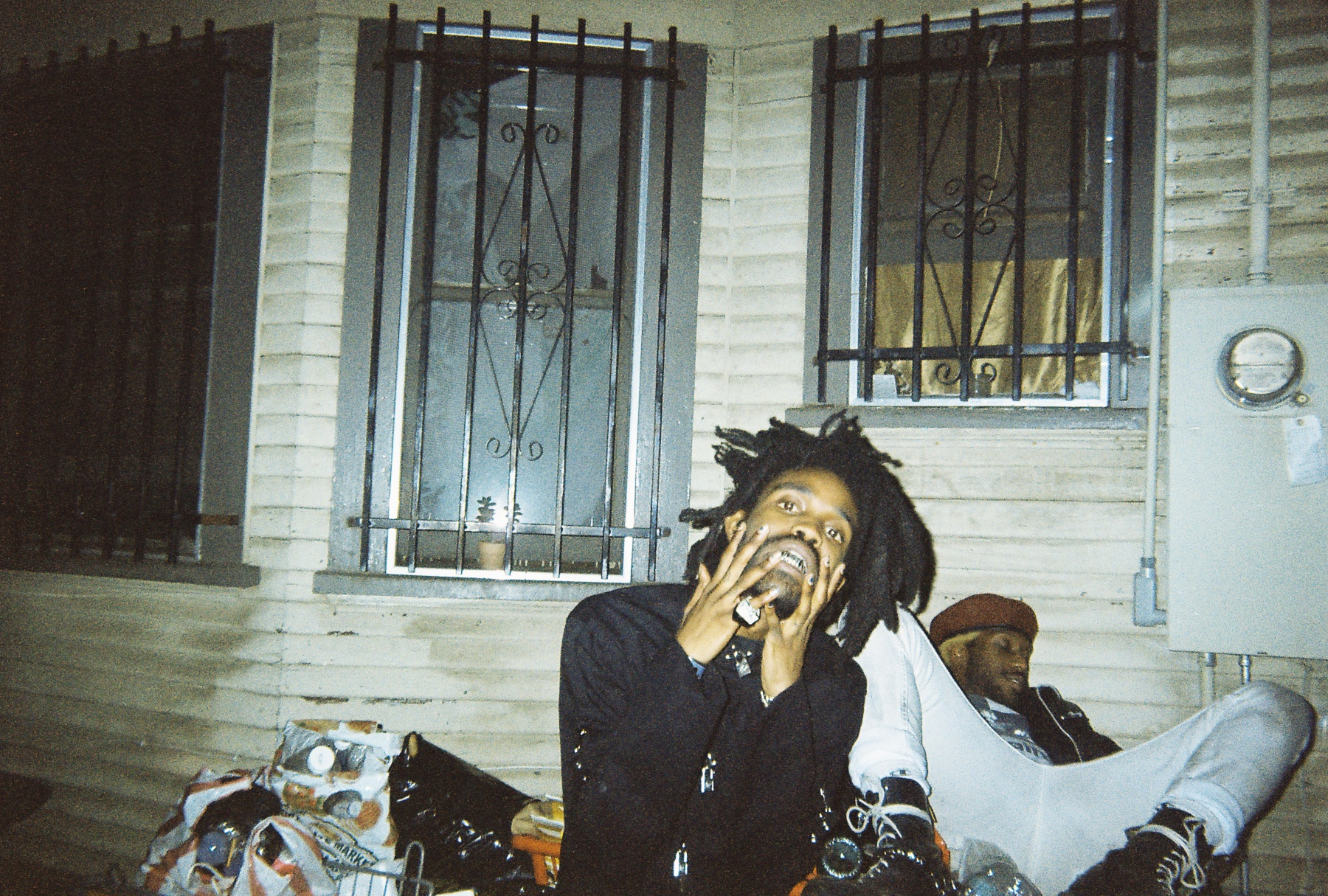
- TheOGM (left) and Yeti Bones (right)

Background information
- Origin: Newark, New Jersey, U.S.
- Genres: Punk rap; industrial hip hop; hardcore punk; experimental hip hop
- Years active: 2012–present
- Labels: Deathkult; DTA; Elektra; Last Gang
- Members: theOGM; Eaddy
- Website: ho99o9.com

Ho99o9 (pronounced Horror) is an American punk rap duo founded in 2012 in Newark, New Jersey by theOGM and Yeti Bones (also known as Eaddy). They relocated to Los Angeles in 2014. They were one of Rolling Stone's "10 New Artists You Need to Know" in 2014 and The Guardian's "New Band of the Week". They have performed at the Afropunk Festival in 2014, the SXSW Music Festival in 2015 and Primavera Sound Festival in 2016. To date, they have released multiple EPs, accompanied by grindhouse-style music videos, and three full-length albums, United States of Horror (2017), SKIN (2022) and Tomorrow We Escape (2025).

== History ==
TheOGM was born in Elizabeth, New Jersey, raised in Linden, New Jersey; Eaddy is from Newark, New Jersey. Both were part of the same performing arts collective, the NJstreetKLAN (also known as the JerseyKLAN) and formed the group in Newark in 2012. They were influenced by hip-hop and gangsta rappers (DMX and Bone Thugs-n-Harmony) in their teens, but later began attending underground punk shows in Brooklyn featuring Japanther, Cerebral Ballzy and The Death Set as well as Ninjasonik, Theophilus London and the A.L.I.E.N. art shows. The band also cites influences that include horror movies and director/former White Zombie frontman Rob Zombie. Critics have noted the band's cinematic influences as well as those of its punk and hip-hop roots, though the band has been compared to Death Grips, Black Flag, Big Black and Bad Brains.

The band played the Afropunk Festival in 2014, the SXSW Music Festival in 2015 and Primavera Sound Festival in 2016; The New York Times' Jon Pareles wrote that the performance was a "welcome charge of adrenaline.". They also toured London (with much support from various DJs on BBC Radio 1), Paris, Brighton and Amsterdam in May 2015. They played the Eurockéennes, Vision, OFF, Pukkelpop, Lowlands, Pop-Kultur Berlin, Iceland Airwaves, and the Reading and Leeds music festivals in the summer of 2015.

The November 6, 2014 episode of Last Call with Carson Daly featured a segment dedicated to Ho99o9 and their live performance. Ho99o9 collaborated with director Bryan Ray Turcotte and photographer Estevan Oriol to capture their performance in their video, "Casey Jones/Cum Rag" which was premiered and was hosted by the Museum of Contemporary Art, Los Angeles.

On June 1, 2015, in the official promotional video for the 2015 Gathering of the Juggalos, it was announced that Ho99o9 would be playing the festival as part of the nighttime concerts.

Ho99o9 toured the UK, headlining in Brighton, and supporting Slaves in Newcastle and Birmingham.

On December 1, 2016, it was announced that Ho99o9 would be supporting The Dillinger Escape Plan on their final UK tour in January 2017. Eaddy started off the tour in Norwich by jumping straight into the audience landing on 3 peoples' heads and then running and tackling people through the audience. In June 2017 the band appeared on the Earache Records stage of Glastonbury Festival in the UK.

On March 29, 2018, the group began their North American Lights Out tour with 3Teeth and Street Sects. On October 11, 2018, The Prodigy released the single "Fight Fire with Fire" featuring Ho99o9 from their album No Tourists.

Ho99o9 opened for Three Days Grace, Prophets of Rage, and Avenged Sevenfold on select dates of the End of the World Tour. Ho99o9 opened for Korn, Alice in Chains and Underoath on a Summer 2019 tour. On November 8, 2025, Ho99o9 opened for grandson in Philadelphia, PA.

In December 2020, "Pig Dinner", written in collaboration with N8NOFACE, was featured in the video game Cyberpunk 2077. The group performed as the in-game fictional band N1v3Z.

The group was featured on a song titled "Paralyze" by industrial metal band 3Teeth. The song was released on August 6, 2021.

== Musical style ==
Ho99o9's musical style has been described as punk rap, industrial hip hop, hardcore punk, alternative hip hop, horrorcore, noise punk, experimental hip hop, hip hop, hardcore hip hop, and industrial.

Loud and Quiet described Ho99o9's sound as a "seething collision of anarchic hardcore punk rock and industrial charged death rap". Earmilk described Ho99o9's sound as "mixing elements of thrashcore punk, noise music, and horrorcore rap". They have often been compared to punk rock band Black Flag and experimental hip hop group Death Grips.

== Members ==
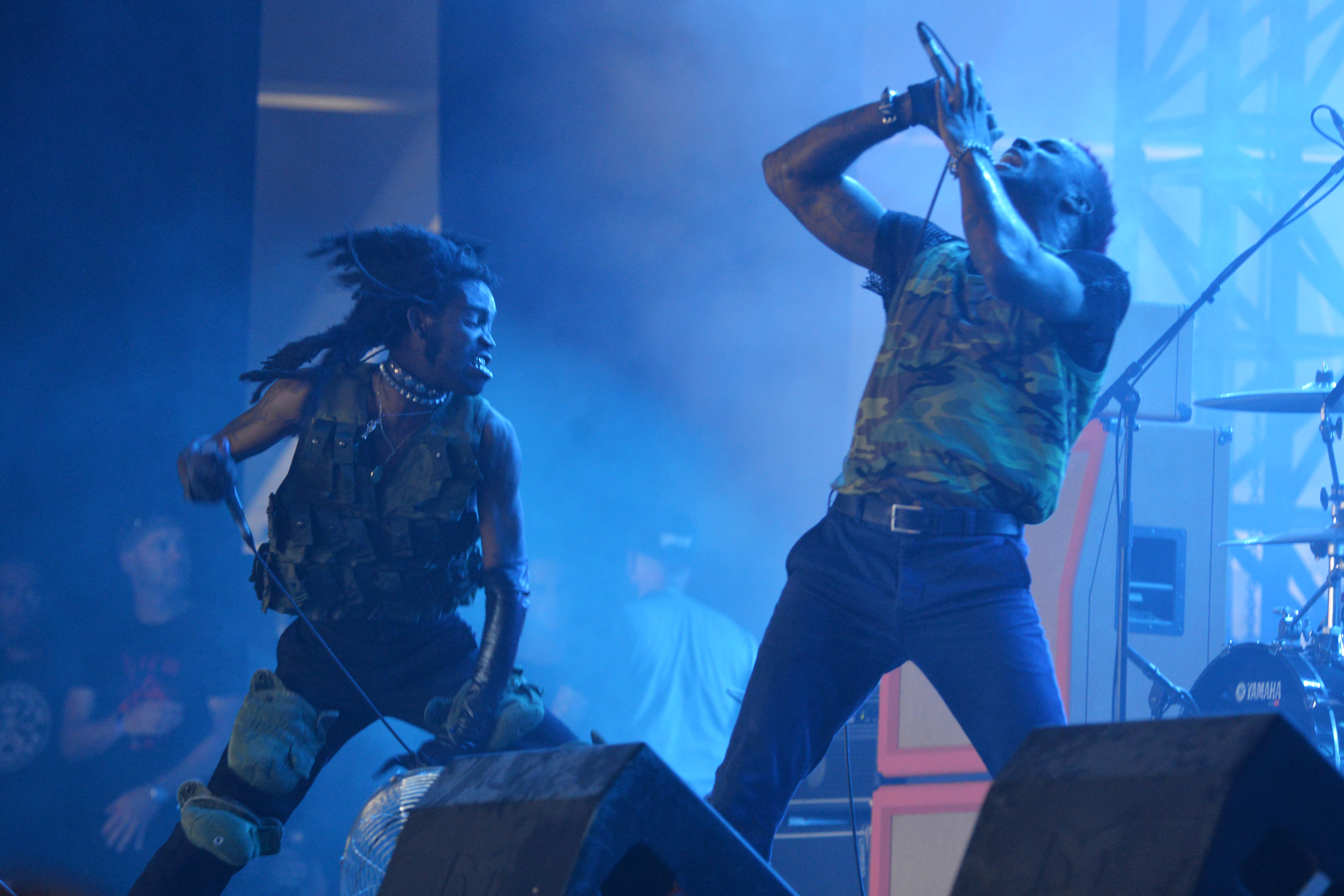
Ho99o9 at Hellfest 2018

Official members

- theOGM – vocals, programming(live) (2012–present)
- Eaddy – vocals, guitar, bass, synthesizers (2012–present)

Session/touring musicians

- Ian Longwell – drums (2012–2016)
- Brandon Pertzborn – drums (2016–2020)
- Billy Rymer – drums (2020–present)
- Thomas Pridgen - drums (2026)

== Discography ==
=== Studio albums ===
- United States of Horror (May 5, 2017)
- Skin (March 11, 2022)
- Tomorrow We Escape (September 9, 2025)

=== Mixtapes ===
- Dead Bodies in the Lake (November 13, 2015)
- Blurr (August 13, 2020)
- Turf Talk Vol. 1 (June 24, 2021)
- Turf Talk Vol. II (October 20, 2023)

=== EPs ===
- Mutant Freax (October 31, 2014)
- Horrors of 1999 (June 9, 2015)
- Cyber Cop [Unauthorized MP3.] (November 30, 2018)
- Cyber Warfare (August 16, 2019)

=== Singles ===
- "Casey Jones" / "Cum Rag" (September 2, 2014)
- "Bone Collector" (September 2, 2014)
- "Blood Waves" (March 3, 2016)
- "The Dope Dealerz" / "Double Barrel" (October 11, 2016)
- "Neighborhood Watch" (October 27, 2017)
- "Lights Out" (with 3Teeth) (February 7, 2018)
- "Time's Up" (with 3Teeth) (March 9, 2018)
- "Twist Of Fate / Cobra" (with Ghostemane) (May 27, 2019)
- "Christopher Dorner / Pray Or Prey" (June 19, 2020)
- "Pigs Want Me Dead" (July 14, 2020)
- "Pig Dinner" (with N8NOFACE) (December 10, 2020)
- "Paralyze" (with 3Teeth) (August 6, 2021)
- "Battery Not Included" (January 20, 2022)
- "NUGE SNIGHT" (February 11, 2022)
- "A Machine Of" (February 27, 2024)
- "Upside Down" (June 13, 2025)
- "Incline" (with Nova Twins, Pink Siifu and Yung Skrrt) (August 6, 2025)

== Awards and nominations ==
Kerrang! Awards

Year	Nominee / work	Award	Result	Ref.
2022	Ho99o9	Best International Act	Nominated	
