= Supercharged (The Offspring album) =

Studio album by the Offspring
- Released: October 11, 2024
- Recorded: September 2022 – May 2024
- Studios: D-13 (Huntington Beach); Plantation (Maui); A'ala (Maui); The Warehouse (Vancouver)
- Genres: Punk rock; pop-punk
- Length: 32:15
- Label: Concord
- Producer: Bob Rock

The Offspring chronology
Puck Punks: The Offspring Powerplay Hits (2024)	Supercharged (2024)	Supercharged Worldwide in '25 (2024)

The Offspring studio chronology
Let the Bad Times Roll (2021)	Supercharged (2024)

Singles from Supercharged
- 1. "Make It All Right" Released: June 7, 2024; 2. "Light It Up" Released: August 2, 2024; 3. "Come to Brazil" Released: September 13, 2024; 4. "OK, But This is The Last Time" Released: October 11, 2024; 5. "Looking Out For #1" Released: June 20, 2025

Professional ratings
Aggregate scores
Source	Rating
Metacritic	70/100
Review scores
Source	Rating
AllMusic	3.5/5 stars
The Arts Desk	4/5 stars
Blabbermouth.net	9/10
Classic Rock	3.5/5 stars
Hot Press	8/10
Kerrang!	3/5 stars
musicOMH	4/5 stars
Sputnikmusic	2.8/5

Supercharged is the eleventh studio album by the American punk rock band the Offspring, released on October 11, 2024, on Concord Records and was produced by Bob Rock, who had worked with the band on its previous three studio albums. It is the band's first album to feature bassist Todd Morse as an official member, although the tracks he played on are unknown, and the band's first album to feature multi-instrumentalist Jonah Nimoy and drummer Brandon Pertzborn, making it the first album with the band as a five-piece.

== Background and recording ==
In a September 2022 interview with Brazilian radio station 89FM A Rádio Rock, frontman Dexter Holland confirmed that the Offspring had begun working on new material for their eleventh studio album: "...[W]e wanna keep things rolling. We had to take time off in the pandemic and we feel like, 'We're back at it. Let's make the most of it right now.' So we're working on a new album." Holland told Times Colonist in November that the band would begin recording their new album in January 2023 with Bob Rock. The Offspring announced on social media in March 2023 that they were "back in the studio."

In September 2023, when Noodles was asked if the new Offspring material follows an "old-school" vein or if it represents "a new era of Offspring", he stated that "It's a little bit of both all that. The last song we did definitely sounds like an old-school — sounds kind of like 'Come Out Swinging'. Definitely some old-school stuff and then some rocking stuff and then some kind of poppy punk stuff too, for sure."

In a May 2024 interview with Atlanta's 99X radio station, Holland and guitarist Noodles confirmed that the band's eleventh studio album was completed and that they were working on the cover art and album title. The following month, it was announced that the album was titled Supercharged and will be released on October 11, 2024. The first single from the album, "Make It All Right", was released on June 7. The second single, "Light It Up" was released on August 2. The third single, "Come to Brazil", was released on September 13. "OK, But This is The Last Time" had a visualizer released on October 11, before being released as the fourth single on May 30, 2025. The fifth single, “Looking Out For #1”, was released on June 27, 2025, as well as two new versions of the song; one being a ska version, the other being a Dublin version.

Holland later told in a press release "We wanted this record to have pure energy — from the start to the finish! That's why we called it Supercharged, from the height of our aspirations to the depths of our struggles, we talk about it all on this record…in a way that celebrates the life that we share and where we are now."

The album was recorded at three different locations: Maui, Vancouver, and the band's home studio in Huntington Beach. The drum duties were split between new drummer, Brandon Pertzborn, and returning session drummer, Josh Freese, while the bass duties were split between lead vocalist, guitarist and primary songwriter Dexter Holland and bassist Todd Morse.

== Critical reception ==
Critic reviews were generally favorable, with many regarding Supercharged as an improvement over their previous album, Let the Bad Times Roll (2021); despite this, it became the Offspring's first studio album since Ignition (1992) not to enter the Billboard 200 chart. The album was preceded by the singles "Make It All Right", "Light It Up", "Come to Brazil", "OK, But This is The Last Time" and "Looking Out For #1".

== Track listing ==
All tracks are written by Dexter Holland.

Supercharged track listing
No.	Title	Length
1.	"Looking Out for #1"	3:16
2.	"Light It Up"	2:52
3.	"The Fall Guy"	2:34
4.	"Make It All Right"	3:34
5.	"OK, But This Is the Last Time"	3:23
6.	"Truth in Fiction"	2:00
7.	"Come to Brazil"	4:19
8.	"Get Some"	2:57
9.	"Hanging by a Thread"	3:26
10.	"You Can't Get There from Here"	3:54
Total length:		32:15

Indie exclusive bonus disc
No.	Title	Length
1.	"Gotta Get Away" (Live in Anaheim, California)	3:46
2.	"Genocide" (Live in Anaheim, California)	4:08
3.	"Gone Away" (Live in Anaheim, California)	5:02
Total length:		12:56

Japanese edition bonus disc
No.	Title	Length
4.	"Blitzkrieg Bop" (Live in Anaheim, California; Ramones cover)	1:54
Total length:		14:50

== Personnel ==
Credits adapted from liner notes.

The Offspring

- Dexter Holland – vocals, guitar, bass, keyboards (1, 10)
- Noodles – guitar
- Todd Morse – bass
- Jonah Nimoy – keyboards
- Brandon Pertzborn – drums (2, 3, 6, 10)

Additional personnel

- Josh Freese – drums (all except 2, 3, 6, 10)
- Bob Rock – guitar, backing vocals
- Adam Greenholtz – keyboards (1, 3–5, 9, 10), backing vocals
- Jamie Muhoberac – keyboards (1)
- Dave Pierce – strings, keyboards (5, 9)
- Rebecca Shoichet – additional vocals on "Make It All Right"
- Adam Garrett – backing vocals

Production

- Bob Rock – producer, mixing
- Adam Greenholtz – mixing
- Emily Lazar – mastering engineer
- Annie Kennedy – assistant engineer
- Theo Wagner – assistant engineer
- Ryan Enockson – assistant engineer
- Stephen Hogan – assistant engineer
- Andrew Fowler – assistant engineer
- John Dibiasi – assistant engineer
- Eric Helmkamp – additional recording
- Daveed Benito – cover art

== Charts ==
Chart performance for Supercharged
Chart (2024)	Peak position
Australian Albums (ARIA)	4
Austrian Albums (Ö3 Austria)	3
Belgian Albums (Ultratop Flanders)	59
Belgian Albums (Ultratop Wallonia)	23
Czech Albums (ČNS IFPI)	57
Finland Physical Albums (Suomen virallinen lista)	9
French Albums (SNEP)	18
French Rock & Metal Albums (SNEP)	3
German Albums (Offizielle Top 100)	6
Greek Albums (IFPI)	74
Japanese Albums (Oricon)	22
Japanese Digital Albums (Oricon)	7
Japanese Hot Albums (Billboard Japan)	15
Polish Albums (ZPAV)	57
Scottish Albums (Official Charts)	14
Spanish Albums (Promusicae)	30
Swedish Physical Albums (Sverigetopplistan)	18
Swiss Albums (Schweizer Hitparade)	5
UK Albums (Official Charts)	43
UK Rock & Metal Albums (Official Charts)	1
US Independent Albums (Billboard)	36
US Top Album Sales (Billboard)	11
US Top Rock & Alternative Albums (Billboard)	50

Chart performance for Supercharged
Chart (2025)	Peak position
Australian Albums (ARIA)	39
Austrian Albums (Ö3 Austria)	78
Canadian Albums (Billboard)	23
Finnish Albums (Suomen virallinen lista)	11
French Albums (SNEP)	89
German Albums (Offizielle Top 100)	88
Dutch Albums (Album Top 100)	67
New Zealand Albums (RMNZ)	5
Swedish Albums (Sverigetopplistan)	9

Chart performance for Supercharged
Chart (2026)	Peak position
Australian Albums (ARIA)	42
Finnish Albums (Suomen virallinen lista)	76
Dutch Albums (Album Top 100)	104
New Zealand Albums (RMNZ)	38
