= We Are Chaos =

Studio album by Marilyn Manson
- Released: September 11, 2020
- Recorded: June 2018 – January 2020
- Studios: The Coil (Hollywood); Station House Studios (Echo Park); Dave's Room (North Hollywood)
- Genres: Post-punk; gothic rock; industrial rock
- Length: 42:27
- Labels: Loma Vista; Concord
- Producers: Marilyn Manson; Shooter Jennings

Marilyn Manson chronology
Heaven Upside Down (2017)	We Are Chaos (2020)	One Assassination Under God – Chapter 1 (2024)

Singles from We Are Chaos
- 1. "We Are Chaos" Released: July 29, 2020; 2. "Don't Chase the Dead" Released: September 10, 2020

We Are Chaos (stylized in all caps) is the eleventh studio album by American rock band Marilyn Manson. It was produced by Marilyn Manson and Shooter Jennings, and was released on September 11, 2020, by Loma Vista Recordings and Concord Music. The title track and "Don't Chase the Dead" were both issued as singles. The album was a critical and commercial success upon release, garnering mostly positive reviews and becoming their first number one album in Portugal, and their first number one record in Australia since 1998's Mechanical Animals.

== Background ==
We Are Chaos was recorded in collaboration between vocalist Marilyn Manson and musician Shooter Jennings. The two were introduced in 2013 by Twiggy Ramirez, former bassist for the Marilyn Manson band. That same year, the producers of Sons of Anarchy asked Manson and Jennings to record a song for the finale to the sixth season of the television series. Their version of the track remains unreleased, with both Manson and Jennings saying they were unhappy with the finished product. The track "Join the Human Gang" was written by Jennings alongside the show's creator Kurt Sutter, and was eventually rewritten and released by The White Buffalo as "Come Join the Murder". Manson went on to portray a character in the seventh season of Sons of Anarchy, and recorded two albums with Tyler Bates: The Pale Emperor and Heaven Upside Down. Manson and Jennings also collaborated on a cover of David Bowie's "Cat People (Putting Out Fire)", for Jennings's album Countach (For Giorgio).

In 2019, drummer Gil Sharone – who performed on The Pale Emperor and Heaven Upside Down – announced he was leaving the band to pursue other projects. Former Black Flag drummer Brandon Pertzborn was hired as his replacement. Shortly after, Manson announced that Bates was no longer involved with the group, and that We Are Chaos would be co-produced by Jennings and feature contributions from his drummer Jamie Douglass. Pertzborn and the band's touring guitarist Paul Wiley were also confirmed to perform on the album. Manson and Jennings recorded a cover version of The Doors track "The End" for use as the theme song for the miniseries The Stand. The track did not appear in the series, however, with director Josh Boone saying a license to use it proved too expensive for a series made on a limited budget.

== Recording and production ==
Manson said recording "The End" informed the approach he and Jennings took while recording We Are Chaos, in that it "started us exploring different things. [Shooter is] very talented in so many ways, and working with him is very fluid. We have a totally different collaborative style than I did [with Tyler] on the last two records. Sometimes Shooter will already be doing something that I was going to suggest. We lock brains a lot together." The album was recorded over two-and-a-half years of intermittent studio time. Since Manson and Jennings's touring commitments made it difficult to coordinate schedules, several different studios were used to record We Are Chaos. Their respective home studios were used as the primary recording locations, with Manson going so far as to rent a house within a short distance of Jennings's to further facilitate recording. Another studio that could accommodate the entirety of Jennings's live band – which included strings and live drums – was also employed.

Despite the difference between the two bands' styles, Manson said they were not "afraid to mix the two together when we were making the songs." We Are Chaos contains ten songs, and no additional tracks were recorded. Manson explained that once his and Jennings's respective bands found a mode to collaborate, the songs "flowed quickly" and "there were no extra songs. There was no fat to cut off the music." The album was produced by Manson and Jennings, and Manson's vocals were recorded late at night; the vocalist said that Jennings deduced his "peak hour for singing was 3 a.m. I'm sure that's probably because it's [when] the full range of rasp comes out of my voice".

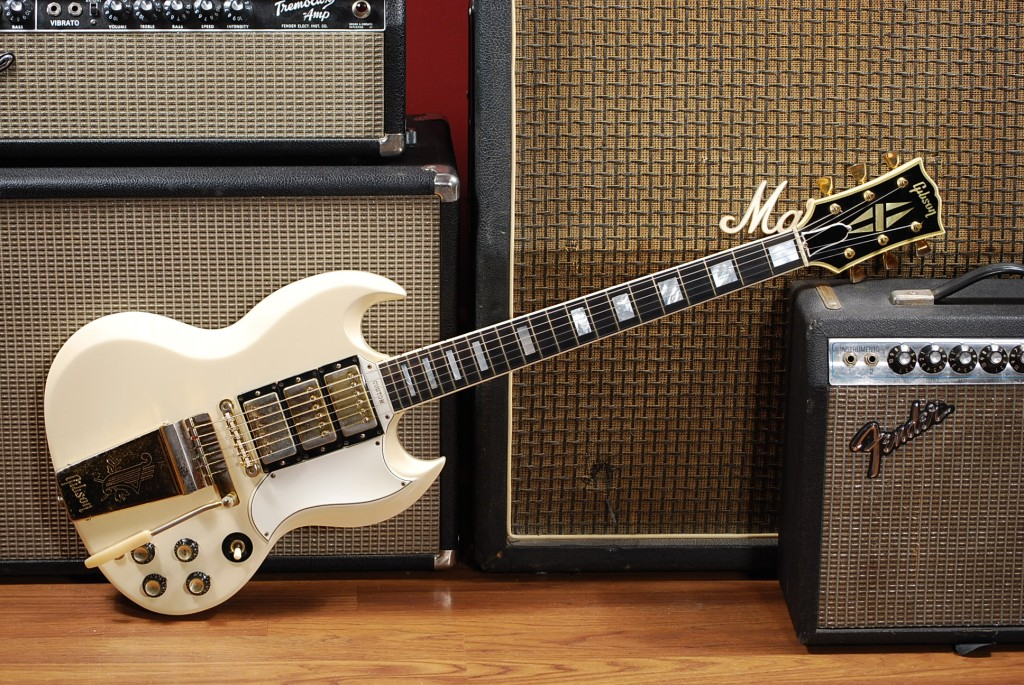
A white 1963 Gibson SG, the same model used to record the album.

Jennings said recording the album made him a more confident lead player, explaining that Manson frequently encouraged him to perform instrumentation he was not familiar with during recording sessions. As a result, he plays bass guitar, keyboards and lead guitar on most songs on the album, and also created all of the drum programming. He said several guitars were used to record We Are Chaos, but that the album predominantly features a black Gibson SG, given as a gift to him on his 20th birthday by his father Waylon Jennings. Other guitars used include a reconstructed 1963 white Gibson SG given to him by Dave Cobb, as well as Manson's own Airliner guitar, which Manson would also use to record various guitar parts. The primary amplifier used was a Gallien-Krueger 250 ML Series 2, as its dual-speaker system could record guitars in stereophonic sound. Jennings complimented the amplifier for its ability to modify guitar tones. A Fender Super Champ was used as a "cool alternative", with Jennings saying: "That thing is magical. You can dial in Jimmy Page or you can dial in the Beatles, or fucking Eric Clapton if you want". Various instruments were processed using an Eventide H910 Harmonizer. Although Jennings said he preferred the Eventide H-10, Manson insisted on using the older H910 model, saying: "This is the David Bowie sound!"

Recording for the album completed in January 2020. That same month, bassist Juan Alderete was involved in a bicycle accident which left him with a diffuse axonal injury, a type of traumatic brain injury. A GoFundMe page was created to help cover the cost of his medical expenses. Alderete is credited with performing bass on the album.

== Composition and style ==
"I'm in a mode in life where I wanted to tell stories with this record, and it's sort of like a wax museum of my thoughts, a study of the chamber of horrors in my head. All the romance and hope you can have in the world, here in the End Times where it can be a different kind of apocalypse for each person listening to the record. I tried to paint it with words, and Shooter with sounds, so you can see and hear all of your longing, your passion and despair. That's sort of a dramatic explanation of it. But it is full of drama. I wouldn't compare it to any of my other records, but you hear a bit of everything—it's like I've focused everything into one spot, finally."

— Marilyn Manson on the composition and production aesthetic of We Are Chaos.

We Are Chaos was written entirely by Manson and Jennings, and was described by reviewers as a post-punk, gothic rock, industrial rock album, with elements of glam rock. The pair initially wrote material separately; Jennings said that during the initial writing sessions he created musical ideas to present to Manson, and the pair then evolved those ideas into songs. According to Jennings, their style of writing eventually developed to a process where they would "just start from scratch in a room. We'd start with a drum beat, or listen to a song that we liked, and the kind of guitar tone that was going on, and then emulate what was going on with that." David Bowie was a primary influence on the album's composition, specifically the material contained on Bowie's box set A New Career in a New Town (1977–1982). Manson gave a copy of that box set to Jennings as a gift early in the album's recording, and the pair frequently listened to it together. During one session, Manson divulged that "Ashes to Ashes" – from Bowie's 1980 album Scary Monsters (and Super Creeps) – was the song that inspired him to become a musician; Jennings said he was inspired to become a musician and learned to play guitar by listening to Antichrist Superstar.

The work of Elton John and Bernie Taupin was also an influence. Several songs on the album were written on piano, a first in Manson's career. Manson explained that "it seemed great for both of us to find a spot where my voice and piano [worked together because it] sounded really different. And it seemed like I could really go places that I had not gone before. Different keys, or different rhythms, or just different elements and ideas." This new style of writing had an impact on his vocal delivery, with Manson saying he sings with a more baritone voice on We Are Chaos than on previous releases. Manson said that Jennings's previous production work had the biggest impact on the album's sound, but denied We Are Chaos consisted of country music. He argued against Jennings's work being classified as such, saying "southern" was a more appropriate classification, noting the latter "also drags in a bit of the Stones, in a way".

A writer for Inked noted the dichotomy between Jennings and Manson's previous work while complimenting the collaboration between two seemingly disparate artists, saying: "The respective musical backgrounds of each musician are also evident, complementing each other throughout the album, but also pushing themselves toward a new direction." They went on to comment that the pair's shared love of 1970s rock music was prevalent throughout We Are Chaos, and noted that although the album contained the "grinding guitars" found on every Marilyn Manson album, the sound was at times more reminiscent of the likes of Bowie, Iggy Pop and Roxy Music. Some lyrics on the album were inspired by the sudden death of Eric Rosenbaum, a tattoo artist publicly known as Norm Love Letters or Norm Will Rise, who had tattooed Manson on several occasions. Manson said: "I had talked to him two days before he died. It was so heartbreaking."

=== Titling and concept ===
Manson initially said the lyrics on the album were autobiographical, and that he considered self-titling the record as a result. This was later revised, however, and he described We Are Chaos as a concept album. The record purposefully includes ten songs, with the explicit intention of listeners being able to experience the album as if it were a traditional LP, with Manson noting the mood and tone of the record changes drastically after the fifth track. He said: "I wanted it to be like any movie or any great book or any painting or any poem, [in] that it becomes part of the listener's experience, not just mine", noting this was what he apprised when listening to Bowie's Diamond Dogs, Alice Cooper's Welcome to My Nightmare and Pink Floyd's The Wall as a teenager, elaborating those albums made a listener "feel like you're a part of something bigger that you can insert yourself into. And I think escapism is an important thing to have now." He went on to say: "Hopefully, [listeners will] interpret it in a way that maybe I didn't even realize." Of the overall concept, he said he hoped listeners would be aware of the presence of a singular story arc, but encouraged people to discover their own story when listening to the album. He said he asked numerous people for their interpretation of the album's content, specifically whether they believed it concluded with a happy, sad or tragic ending.

=== Songs ===
==== Side A ====
The first song on the album is titled "Red Black and Blue", whose introduction consists of the vocalist reciting prose text, which he said set the mood for what was to follow on the album. In the prose, he proclaims himself to be a king bee who will cover the Earth in honey so that everyone will devour themselves. AllMusic compared the introductory prose to a sermon, before saying the song "quickly rumbles to life with a pounding beat, gurgling bass, and chugging riffage." Guitars featured on the song were recorded using the GK250 amplifier, which Jennings referred to as the best amplifier in his collection. He highlighted the amp for its "chorus button" feature, which he said was used to record "those huge tones on 'Red Black and Blue' for the chunking guitars." Reviewers compared the song to the work of White Zombie.

Despite being written eighteen months before the album was released, and before the COVID-19 pandemic began, Manson said the lyrics to the title track could be interpreted as referring to the impact of COVID-19 lockdowns on mental health. Although it contains political and religious references, the song was primarily inspired by Manson seeking to relate emotionally to the rest of the world. American Songwriter compared the lyric to those of Kurt Cobain, describing the chorus as being "among the most visceral, primal expressions of inner turmoil" since Nirvana's "Smells Like Teen Spirit". The acoustic guitars on the song use Nashville tuning, which Jennings said he utilized to "bring that Elvis [Presley] meets Jeff Lynn vibe. Nashville tuning gives you the glimmer but you don't have that whole fucking hippy, '60s peace thing going on."

"Don't Chase the Dead" is a post-punk song, and was the first track recorded for the album. Jennings said it was originally written on a Gibson Hummingbird as an acoustic song, but became predominantly electric during recording. The majority of the track was recorded by Manson, Jennings and drummer Jamie Douglass in five hours. The shoegaze-influenced "Paint You with My Love" opens with Manson singing in falsetto tones. Manson said he was asked who sang the intro upon playing the song to the band's former longtime bassist Twiggy Ramirez, claiming the bassist did not recognize his voice in that key. The Arts Desk described it as the prettiest song on the album, comparing the song to T-Rex and Manson's vocals to Bauhaus. Along with the album opener, guitars on the song were recorded using the chorus button of the GK250 amplifier. Jennings described them as "kinda getting that dirty… It sounds like 'Ziggy Stardust' guitar. That amp can really morph sounds well. It can change just depending on how you adjust the knobs."

"Half-Way & One Step Forward" is a new wave song, and was the first track Manson and Jennings wrote together. The vocalist said he was excited as a result of the track's composition, describing it as "so strangely different" to anything he had written previously. It was compared to the work of Depeche Mode, specifically the material contained on their 1993 album Songs of Faith and Devotion. Manson said the album contains a distinct line after this track, calling the title "Half-Way & One Step Forward" an "obvious" clue as to the album's duality.

==== Side B ====
The title of the sixth song on the album, "Infinite Darkness", is also the title of the self-portrait featured on the album cover. After Manson created the painting, he and Jennings began work on the similarly titled song, with the vocalist saying this was the point when the album "really developed into something". Classic Rock said it was the sole track on We Are Chaos that could be described as industrial goth, which they said was the genre that Manson "built his empire on." AllMusic said the song contained "suitably buzzing riffs, cacophonous percussion, and a feral vocal performance", and that both it and the album's next track, "Perfume", were two of the record's most "classic-sounding moments." Other reviewers noted the two songs contained apparent lyrical references to the Me Too movement. NME highlighted the "Infinite Darkness" lyric "Just 'cause you're famous doesn't mean you're worth anything/ In this world or the next one or the one before", while The Independent said "Perfume" saw him hammering the "21st-century cult of celebrity victimhood" with the lyric "'Cause victim is chic/ You're as famous as your pain".

The main riff on "Keep My Head Together" was recorded using the acoustic Gibson Hummingbird guitar. Jennings explained the acoustic guitar was recorded via an AKG 451 microphone connected to a Super Champ amplifier, and that the guitar was "right on" the microphone, "really close, and I was playing it really, really quiet, so quiet and so compressed that it became really big, so it sounds like an electric that you can't really identify but it's really the Hummingbird that's been mic'd closely and put through an amp and played extremely quietly." AllMusic compared the guitars on the track to the Smiths's "How Soon Is Now". The track features guitar overdubbing performed by John Sheffler, who performed electric guitar overdubs as well as pedal steel guitar on several tracks on the album.

NME described "Solve Coagula" as an arena rock song, with The Independent saying that on the track Manson "offers the surprisingly graceful acceptance of 'I'm not special/ I'm just broken/ And I don't wanna be fixed.'" Consequence of Sound called the song a gem, elaborating that "the drums, guitars and keyboard of the chorus swell together creating an emotional riptide that pulls the listener along with it. The guitar work recalls Pink Floyd's David Gilmour and the keyboards are reminiscent of something off of Mechanical Animals, if it had a little more time to mature." Similarly, AllMusic said the "mirrored pair" of "Half-Way & One Step Forward" and "Broken Needle" end up sounding like "unearthed treasures from the glam rock Mechanical Animals era." Inked commented that Manson and Jennings's shared love of rock music from the 1970s is exemplified with this track, and Hot Press called it one of "the most exciting songs he's made in years". Vinyl editions of the album end in a locked groove, in which a two-second section of the outro to "Broken Needle" endlessly repeats itself.

== Release and promotion ==
We Are Chaos was originally scheduled to be released in February or March 2020, but this was rescheduled after the cancellation of the band's appearance as the opening act on Ozzy Osbourne's No More Tours II series, a North American arena tour set to begin in May 2020. The tour was cancelled when Osbourne was diagnosed with Parkinson's disease. The title track was issued as the lead single from the record on July 29, 2020. A music video for the song was released the same day, which was directed, photographed and edited by Matt Mahurin while in quarantine due to the COVID-19 pandemic. "We Are Chaos" peaked at number eight on Billboard's Mainstream Rock Chart, the band's third top ten hit there. In an interview published on September 8, Manson said he intended to shoot a music video for "Don't Chase the Dead", but said this may not be possible due to the COVID-19 pandemic. Despite this, the song was released as the second single from the album on September 10, a day before the album's release.

The album was released on September 11, 2020, and several editions were issued, including CD and cassette versions, as well as numerous limited edition vinyl options: a picture disc, standard black as well as pink and blue colored vinyls, and a red, black and blue-spattered colored vinyl. The latter was bundled with a limited edition 7" vinyl single of "We Are Chaos", containing an exclusive remix as a B-side. CD versions of the albums released in brick and mortar stores contained two bonus tracks: acoustic versions of "We Are Chaos" and "Broken Needle". These songs also appeared as bonuses on Japanese editions of the CD. Additionally, Target stores in North America were supplied with an exclusive "translucent black ice" marbled edition of the vinyl, containing a limited edition art print.

Manson created the artwork for the album. The cover image is a watercolor self-portrait entitled Infinite Darkness. Manson said he entered a trance-like state when creating the artwork, to the extent that the following morning, he almost forgot he had painted it. He sent a photograph of the still-drying painting to Jennings, who remarked it should be used as the album cover. A music video for "Don't Chase the Dead", directed by Travis Shin and featuring actor Norman Reedus and Manson's girlfriend Lindsay Usich, was released on September 24. Soon after, Manson revealed that he and Lindsay Usich were married in a private ceremony while in lockdown. "Don't Chase the Dead" eventually peaked at number 29 on Billboard's Mainstream Rock Chart, making We Are Chaos their first studio album since 1998's Mechanical Animals to contain more than one top thirty-peaking song on that chart. The song also entered Billboard's Hot Rock & Alternative Songs chart, and the top five of Hot Hard Rock Songs.

== Critical reception ==
Professional ratings
Aggregate scores
Source	Rating
AnyDecentMusic?	7.9/10
Metacritic	77/100
Review scores
Source	Rating
AllMusic	4/5 stars
Clash	7/10
Consequence of Sound	A−
Exclaim!	7/10
The Independent	3/5 stars
Kerrang!	4/5 stars
Metal Hammer	4/5 stars
musicOMH	4.5/5 stars
NME	5/5 stars
Rolling Stone	2.5/5 stars

We Are Chaos received generally positive reviews from music critics. At Metacritic, which assigns a normalized rating out of 100 to reviews from mainstream critics, the album has an average score of 77 based on 11 reviews, indicating "generally favorable reviews". This is the highest score received by any of the band's albums since the website began collecting data, with their 2000 album Holy Wood (In the Shadow of the Valley of Death). Aggregator AnyDecentMusic? gave the album 7.9 out of 10, based on their assessment of the critical consensus. This is also the band's highest album rating on that website, since it began collecting data in 2009.

Several publications praised the quality of songwriting and production on We Are Chaos, including NME, which complimented Manson's lyricism for focusing less on spectacle and more on craft, and praised Jennings's production for introducing a wide variety of styles to the album. Similarly, AllMusic commended the focus on song-craft, saying this was the key to the band's later-career rejuvenation, elaborating: "As the years of shock tactics and theatrics fade into memory, Manson's left with just the music, aging as gracefully as he can with another expertly crafted offering for the altar." Hot Press said the record contained some of the most exciting songs the band had recorded in years, while Kerrang! said it continued their creative resurgence, complimenting the "razor-sharp" lyricism and saying the production evoked a "sense of stateliness at times" and a "sleazy rock club stench at others". Metal Hammer praised the lyrics for being more emotionally vulnerable than Manson had ever been previously. Classic Rock noted the absence of intentionally provocative lyrics on We Are Chaos, saying that instead it found Manson reflecting "the terrors that are already out there" before summarizing: "It's good to have the king of modern mischief back to cast a milky eye over the mess we've got ourselves into."

Other writers commented on the musical diversity found on the album. Consequence of Sound said the production, musicianship and songwriting on the record were among the best of the band's entire discography, and that the musical variation on the record was intriguing. A staff writer for Sputnikmusic described the level of variety as "supreme" and said the record uncovers an adroit chapter in the band's career. They complimented it for mixing elements from their older work with new influences, and said this shift in tone was comparable to the inclusion of blues rock on The Pale Emperor. They went on to describe the album as "a staggering statement that manages to overthrow the greatness of even The Pale Emperor." The Arts Desk said that as a result of the musical variation, the album was "more tuneful and affecting than anything else" the band had ever released. musicOMH said the tracks on the album are "stronger, tougher and better than they have any right to be", calling the album "stunning" and dubbing it the band's "most complete artistic statement" since Holy Wood.

Numerous publications applauded the collaboration between Manson and Jennings. Clash said that despite being disparate musicians, the pair had "created, if not perfected, a rousing ballad of angst for the Millennials", describing it as a concise album without filler and one that "genuinely gets better with each listen." Exclaim! said the record continued the band's creative resurgence, describing it as a "logical and welcome next step" in their discography, and said the best tracks on the album were among the strongest of their latter discography. They went on to summarize that although the vocalist "may not be the pop culture figure he once was, Marilyn Manson is still capable of churning out some of modern rock music's finest work."

The album received some mixed reviews as well. In a brief review, Rolling Stone said the songs on the album were not memorable. Mojo said the best songs on the record were the tracks where Manson "actually emotes", and summarized: "Manson's Iggyesque croak begs for the pared-to-the-essence Rick Rubin treatment; We Are Chaos isn't that record, but it's a step in that direction." Although The Independent complimented the quality of musicianship and variety found on the album, saying it "spans everything from Satanism to angry Enya", their writer simultaneously lauded and criticized the lyrics for both critiquing the MeToo movement and for lyrical content they perceived as misogynistic. Our Culture Mag echoed this sentiment, saying the most entertaining albums in the band's discography were those which "acknowledge the misanthropy and nihilism" were "a guise played up for dramatic effect". They said the album "works best when it acts as a dark mirror to society", but that it was sonically inferior to its predecessor.

Both Cleveland.com and The Oakland Press dubbed We Are Chaos the album of the week, while Spin said it was the eighth-best album ever produced by Jennings. The record went on to appear on numerous best albums of 2020 lists, including ones by Alternative Press, Consequence of Sound, Loudwire, Metal Hammer, Revolver, Sputnikmusic, Ultimate Classic Rock, and Scandinavian publication Nöjesguiden. The album was nominated in the "International Record of the Year" category at the 2021 Danish Gaffa Awards, where Manson was also nominated for "International Soloist of the Year".

== Commercial performance ==
Industry forecasters predicted the record was on course to debut in the United States with pure album sales of between 20,000 and 22,000 copies, with an additional 2,000 to 5,000 units as a result of streaming and album-equivalent units. It went on to debut as the highest-selling album of the week based on pure sales. Despite this, it entered in the lower portion of the top ten of the Billboard 200, primarily as a result of a lack of streaming activity. The record debuted at number eight on the Billboard 200 with 31,000 album-equivalent units in its first week, becoming Manson's tenth top ten album. The recorded units included 28,000 traditional album sales, 3,000 streaming-equivalent units (or 4 million on-demand streams of album tracks), and less than 1,000 track-equivalent units (sales of individual tracks). It also debuted atop Top Rock Albums, making it their first number one on that chart, and was their fifth consecutive number one on Top Hard Rock Albums; only three other acts have more number ones on the latter chart—Five Finger Death Punch, Linkin Park and Pearl Jam, who each peaked at the summit six times. The album sold an additional 6,775 traditional copies on its second week in the US, and 4,125 traditional copies the following week. As of February 2021, by which point Manson was dropped by Loma Vista following abuse allegations made against him by former girlfriend Evan Rachel Wood, the album had sold 69,000 copies in the United States. We Are Chaos had the highest pure album sales total of the week in Canada, debuting at number eight.

The album was predicted to enter the top three of the UK Albums Chart. It went on to match the peak of previous album Heaven Upside Down when it entered the chart at number seven with first week sales of 4,638 copies, 437 copies behind the album which peaked at number three, making it the band's sixth top ten album in the UK. The record debuted at number one on the ARIA Charts, making it the band's second number one album in Australia, following Mechanical Animals. In Japan, the record debuted at number 28 on the Oricon album chart, with first week sales of 1,344 copies.

== Track listing ==
All tracks are written by Marilyn Manson and Shooter Jennings.

Standard edition
No.	Title	Length
1.	"Red Black and Blue"	5:03
2.	"We Are Chaos"	4:00
3.	"Don't Chase the Dead"	4:17
4.	"Paint You with My Love"	4:29
5.	"Half-Way & One Step Forward"	3:16
6.	"Infinite Darkness"	4:15
7.	"Perfume"	3:33
8.	"Keep My Head Together"	3:49
9.	"Solve Coagula"	4:22
10.	"Broken Needle"	5:23
Total length:		42:27

"Brick & Mortar" deluxe edition and Japanese edition bonus tracks
No.	Title	Length
11.	"We Are Chaos" (acoustic version)	4:05
12.	"Broken Needle" (acoustic version)	5:21
Total length:		51:53

Notes

- All song titles are stylized in all caps.

== Personnel ==
Credits adapted from the album liner notes of We Are Chaos.

- Recorded at The Coil, Hollywood; additional recording at Station House Studios, Echo Park and Dave's Room, North Hollywood
- Mixed by Mark "Spike" Stent
- Album mastered by Randy Merrill at Sterling Sound
- Acoustic versions mastered by Pete Lyman at Infrasonic Sound

Musicians

- Marilyn Manson – vocals, instrumentation
- Shooter Jennings – instrumentation
- Juan Alderete – bass
- Jamie Douglass – drums
- Ted Russell Kamp – bass
- Brandon Pertzborn – drums
- Aubrey Richmond – fiddle
- John Schreffler – guitars, pedal steel guitar
- Paul Wiley – guitars

Technical

- Marilyn Manson – songwriting, production, artwork
- Shooter Jennings – songwriting, production
- Tony Ciulla – management
- Christopher Leckie – layout design
- OH1 – mix programming
- Steve Olmon – session assistant
- Mark Rains – engineering
- David Spreng – engineering, additional instrumentation, "second layer additional mix"

== Charts ==
=== Weekly charts ===
Weekly chart performance for We Are Chaos
Chart (2020)	Peak position
Australian Albums (ARIA)	1
Austrian Albums (Ö3 Austria)	2
Belgian Albums (Ultratop Flanders)	6
Belgian Albums (Ultratop Wallonia)	7
Canadian Albums (Billboard)	8
Czech Albums (ČNS IFPI)	16
Danish Albums (Hitlisten)	34
Danish Vinyl Albums (Hitlisten)	2
Dutch Albums (Album Top 100)	29
Finnish Albums (Suomen virallinen lista)	8
French Albums (SNEP)	10
German Albums (Offizielle Top 100)	4
Greek Albums (IFPI Greece)	17
Hungarian Albums (MAHASZ)	7
Irish Albums (Official Charts)	26
Italian Albums (FIMI)	12
Japan Hot Albums (Billboard Japan)	33
Japanese Albums (Oricon)	28
Lithuanian Albums (AGATA)	44
New Zealand Albums (RMNZ)	32
Norwegian Vinyl Albums (VG-lista)	8
Polish Albums (ZPAV)	12
Portuguese Albums (AFP)	1
Scottish Albums (Official Charts)	2
Slovak Albums (ČNS IFPI)	36
Spanish Albums (PROMUSICAE)	8
Swedish Albums (Sverigetopplistan)	24
Swedish Hard Rock Albums (Sverigetopplistan)	1
Swiss Albums (Schweizer Hitparade)	2
Taiwanese Rock Albums (KKBox)	34
UK Albums (Official Charts)	7
UK Rock & Metal Albums (Official Charts)	1
US Billboard 200	8
US Top Hard Rock Albums (Billboard)	1
US Top Rock Albums (Billboard)	1

=== Year-end charts ===
Year-end chart performance for We Are Chaos
Chart (2020)	Position
Belgian Albums (Ultratop Wallonia)	182
US Top Hard Rock Albums (Billboard)	35
US Top Rock Albums (Billboard)	84
US Top Current Album Sales (Billboard)	94
