= Socionic =

- Origin: Los Angeles, California
- Genres: Progressive metal, alternative metal, hard rock, industrial rock, dark ambient
- Years active: 2008–present
- Members: Michael Meinhart; Matthew Denis; Lior Dar
- Website: socionicband.com

Socionic is an American, progressive, hard rock band formed in Los Angeles, California by singer and songwriter Michael Meinhart in 2008.

== History ==
=== Origin ===
The band was originally formed as a multi-media studio side project in 2008 by Michael Meinhart while he was performing with other bands around Los Angeles. The project has since developed into a full band with the addition of members Matthew Denis (bass) and Lior Dar (drums) and has played shows all around Southern California and up the West Coast opening up for other acts such as Fear Factory and Jonathan Davis.

After the completion of a set of demos titled "The Ogden Project", the band enlisted the help of producer Rhys Fulber, known for work with Fear Factory, Front Line Assembly, Megadeth, Mudvayne, Delerium, Mindless Self Indulgence and Paradise Lost, to begin work on an EP. The album, entitled "Identity" was released on October 16, 2012. Fulber's experience with industrial and ambient music played a big role in shaping the production and sound of the album.

In February 2013, the album received acclaim from Music Connection Magazine by receiving 8/10 stars and citing “Stellar performances, rich production and an ability to craft multi-level, Tool-like tunes that would improve any sci-fi/horror soundtrack.” The review would later qualify the album for the Top 25 New Music Critiques of 2013 in the publication's December, 2013 issue.

== Music ==
The band approaches music with a style of progressive and layered arrangements, using instrumental dynamics, time changes and layered production. Their composition style ranges from tradition rock arrangements to longer less conventional arrangements containing ambient interludes. While mainly using guitars and drums they also integrate elements of industrial music by adding electronic elements such as synthesizers and samples to song production. The vocal style is often dynamic, ranging from whispers to aggressive singing techniques.

== Visual arts ==
=== "Identity" Concept Album ===
Emphasizing the use of visuals and multi medium art creation, Socionic partnered with artist Valp, Maciej Handrich (known for working on Pendulum, Immersion and Knife Party cover artwork), to develop of concept album of visual artworks to accompany each song on the "Identity" release. Two of the six song artworks, "Epiphany" and "Ignorant Idiot" were later featured in Advanced Photoshop Magazine issue 111, July 2013, and issue 116, November 2013 respectively.

=== "Identity" Artwork Videos ===
As an extension of the original concept artwork for the "Identity" song pieces, the band also created two animated music videos, one for the single "Epiphany", and another for "Stain Serenity", and published them to YouTube.
