= Brandon Pertzborn =

American drummer (born 1994)

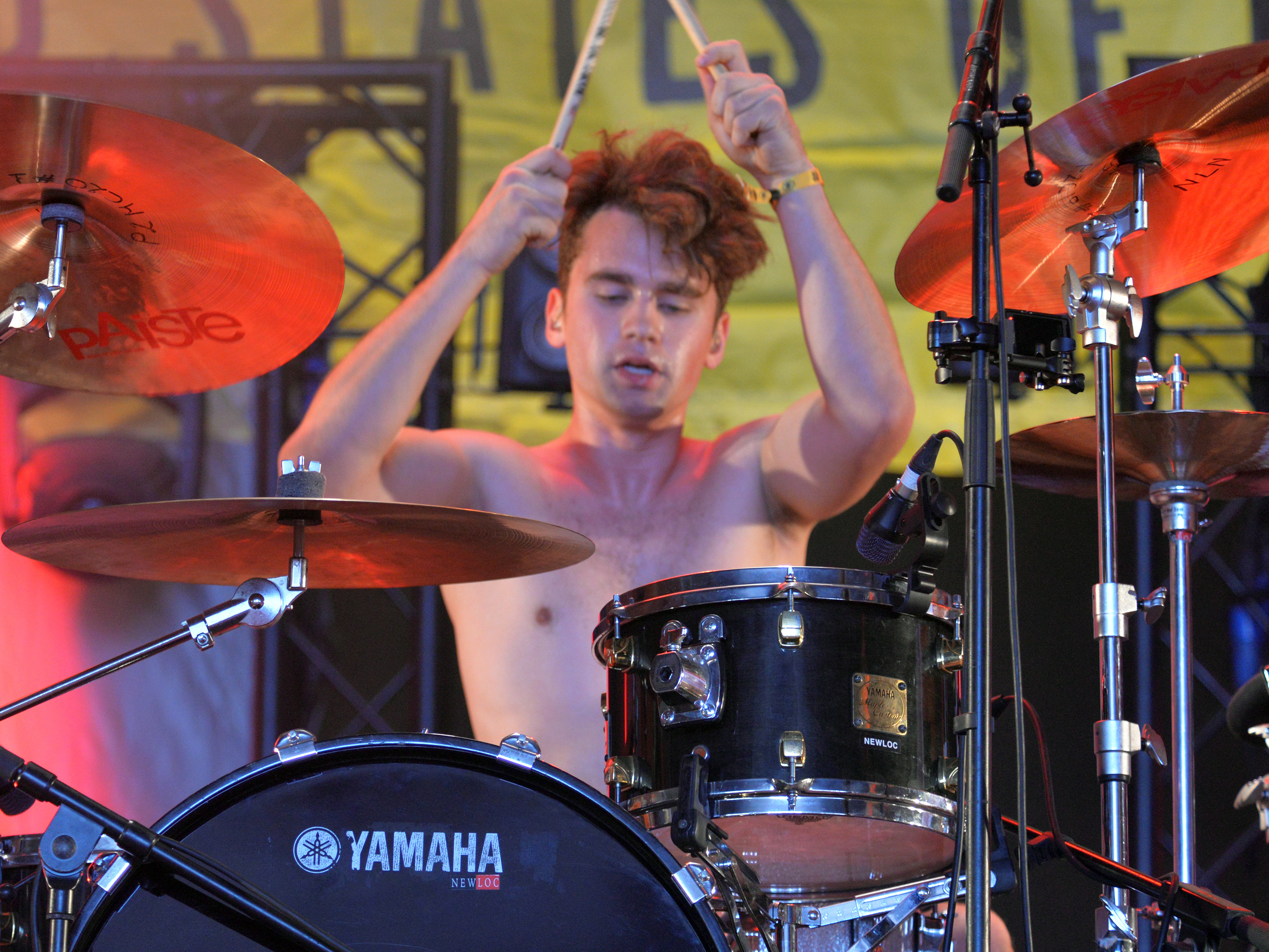
- Pertzborn performing with Ho99o9 in 2018

Background information
- Born: October 17, 1994 (age 31); Grapevine, Texas, U.S.
- Genres: Alternative rock; punk rock; alternative metal; post-metal; crossover thrash; nu metal
- Occupation: Musician
- Instrument: Drums
- Years active: 2014–present
- Member of: The Offspring
- Formerly of: Black Flag; Doyle; Marilyn Manson; Suicidal Tendencies
- Spouse: Emily Vallely (m. 2022)
- Website: brandonpertzborn.com

Brandon Pertzborn (born October 17, 1994) is an American musician who is the current drummer for the punk rock band the Offspring and former drummer for Marilyn Manson, Suicidal Tendencies, Black Flag and Doyle. He has also toured with With Our Arms to the Sun, Corey Taylor, Limp Bizkit and Ho99o9.

== Early life ==
Pertzborn was born in Grapevine, Texas, where he started playing the drums at the age of 14. He took his first drumming lessons at school, but soon dropped out to learn on his own. Within a few years, he joined several bands with friends. After playing the drums for a few years, Pertzborn began teaching drums at multiple music schools in the area.

== Career ==
=== Black Flag and Doyle ===
In 2014 Pertzborn received an e-mail from Black Flag's Greg Ginn, who, after seeing a number of videos, asked him if he wanted to audition. The band went on tour in 2015 and was the opening act for the band Doyle, a band led by Misfits guitarist Doyle Wolfgang von Frankenstein. As a result, Pertzborn received a call from the band offering him to join Doyle. Pertzborn accepted the offer and joined Doyle. Immediately after touring with Doyle, he recorded the drums for Doyle's second album, Doyle II: As We Die.

=== Marilyn Manson ===
In 2019, Pertzborn joined Marilyn Manson to replace drummer Gil Sharone after he announced he was leaving the band to pursue "other current and future projects". In July, Pertzborn played his first tour, the Twins of Evil: Hell Never Dies Tour in the US and Canada with co-headliner Rob Zombie, followed by festivals and headline dates with support from Deadly Apples. The band released their cover of The Doors' "The End" on streaming music services in November, with a limited edition vinyl scheduled to be issued on March 6, 2020. That same year Pertzbornn recorded the drum tracks for the album We Are Chaos (2020).

=== Suicidal Tendencies ===
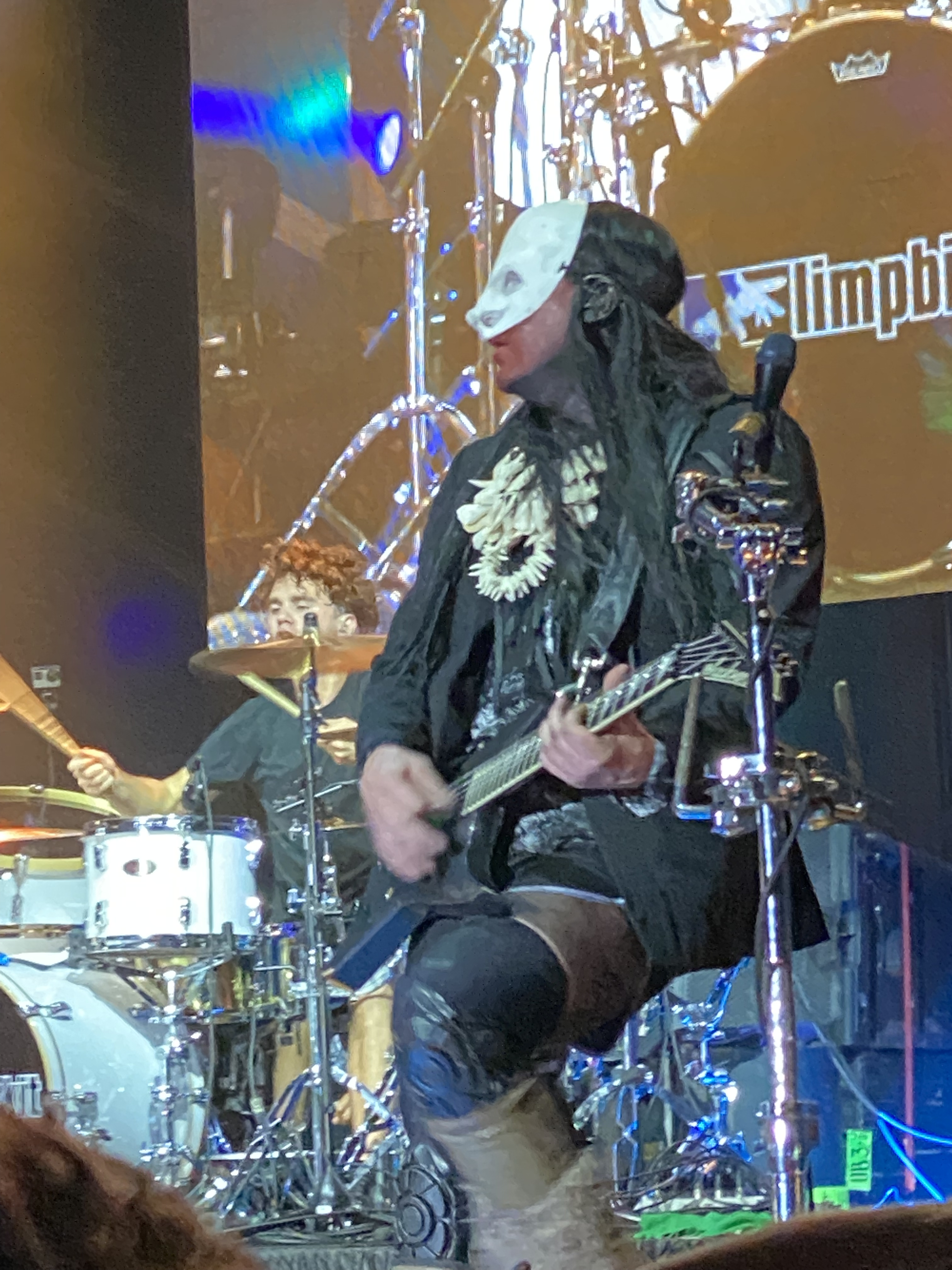
Pertzborn (background) performing with Limp Bizkit in 2021

In 2021 Pertzborn joined Suicidal Tendencies as a replacement for Dave Lombardo, who had left the band due to commitments with other bands (including Mr. Bungle and Testament). In April 2023, Pertzborn announced that he would be leaving Suicidal Tendencies and would be replaced by Greyson Nekrutman.

=== The Offspring ===
In May 2023, Pertzborn announced himself as the new drummer for the Offspring after Josh Freese (who was their touring drummer) was no longer able to tour with the band full-time as he joined the Foo Fighters, with Pertzborn becoming the official replacement for Pete Parada, who parted ways with the band in July 2021 for declining to take a COVID-19 vaccine on the advice of his doctor, due to suffering from Guillain–Barré syndrome. Pertzborn's first recording with the Offspring is their eleventh studio album Supercharged (2024).

== Equipment ==
Brandon endorses and uses Pearl Drums, Paiste cymbals, Vic Firth sticks and Remo heads.

== Discography ==
Year	Act	Title
2017	Ho99o9	United States of Horror
2017	Doyle	Doyle II: As We Die
2019	Ho99o9	Cyber Warfare
2020	Ho99o9	Blurr (Mixtape)
2020	Marilyn Manson	We Are Chaos
2021	Ho99o9	Ho99o9 presents Territory : Turf Talk, Vol. 1
2022	Ho99o9	SKIN
2024	The Offspring	Supercharged
