= Michael Omartian discography =

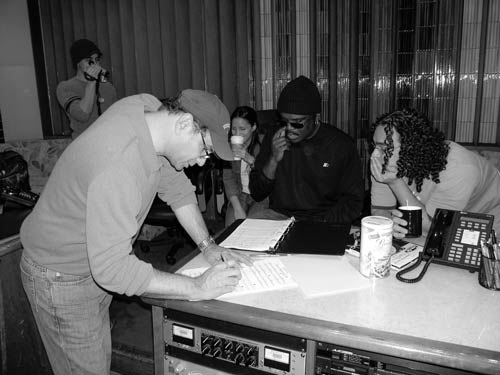
- Michael Omartian (left) with Tommy Sims (middle) and Jammes "Jamba" Castro (right) in a string session at Starstruck studion in Nashville.
- Studio albums: 4
- EPs: 2
- Compilation albums: 1
- Collaboration: 9

Michael Omartian, American musician, keyboardist, and music producer has released 4 solo studio albums, 9 collaboration albums, 4 promotional singles, 2 EPs, and 1 compilation albums. He has sold over 350 million albums over the span of his career whether it be through being a solo artist, producer, or anything of the like.

He launched his musical career in the 1970s with the disco band Rhythm Heritage. The group went on to be known for their #1 single, "Theme from S.W.A.T." which peaked at number 1 on the US Hot 100. While with the band, he released multiple solo albums and with others, like White Horse and Adam Again

After the disbandment of Rhythm Heritage in 1979 after ruling the 1970s, he focused more on producing in the Christian field of music as a session musician. Thanks in part to incredibly successful albums like Amy Grant's Heart in Motion, which sold over five million copies, he became widely known in the music industry as a producer and gradually stopped focusing on his solo work.

== Discography ==
=== Solo ===
- 1974: White Horse (Myrrh Records)
- 1977: Adam Again (Myrrh)
- 1986: Conversations (instrumental) (Reunion)
- 1991: The Race (Word/Epic)

=== Michael and Stormie Omartian ===
- 1978: Seasons of the Soul (Myrrh)
- 1980: The Builder (Seymour)
- 1982: Mainstream (Sparrow)
- 1982: Omartian Odyssey: The Musical Journey of Michael and Stormie Omartian (compilation) (Myrrh)
- 1983: Together Live (with 2nd Chapter of Acts) (Sparrow)

=== Others ===
- 1970: The Armageddon Experience - Mike Omartian Band
- 1974: Compliments of Garcia Jerry Garcia (Round)
- 1976: Through a Child's Eyes Annie Herring (Sparrow)
- 1995: Like Brothers Pratt & McClain (Sonrise Music)
- 1995: Contemporary Mozart (non-US release entitled Bon Appetit: Contemporary Mozart Arrangements Volume 2) (K-Tel)
- 2000: Child of the Promise: A Musical Story Celebrating The Birth of Christ Michael and Stormie Omartian (Sparrow)

== Producer ==
- 1972: I've Found Someone of My Own The Free Movement
- 1974: White Horse Michael Omartian
- 1975: Young Frankenstein (original soundtrack)
- 1976: I'd Rather Believe in You Cher
- 1976: I've Got a Reason The Richie Furay Band
- 1976: Streetheart Dion DiMucci
- 1977: Love at First Sight Dionne Warwick
- 1977: Crackin' Crackin'
- 1978: Special Touch Crackin'
- 1978: Sweet Salvation Jim Krueger (musician)
- 1979: Christopher Cross Christopher Cross
- 1979: One More Song for You The Imperials
- 1979: Radio Dream by Roger Voudouris
- 1980: Priority The Imperials
- 1981: Maxus Maxus
- 1981: Nobody Knows Me Like You Benny Hester
- 1981: Still Feels Good Tom Johnston
- 1983: Another Page Christopher Cross
- 1983: She Works Hard for the Money Donna Summer
- 1984: Camouflage Rod Stewart
- 1984: Cats Without Claws Donna Summer
- 1985: Choose Life Debby Boone
- 1985: Every Turn of the World Christopher Cross
- 1986: About Last Night... (original soundtrack)
- 1986: Conversations Michael Omartian
- 1986: The Karate Kid, Pt. 2 (original soundtrack)
- 1986: Solitude/Solitaire Peter Cetera
- 1987: Friends for Life Debby Boone
- 1988: Back of My Mind Christopher Cross
- 1989: Bowling in Paris Stephen Bishop
- 1990: Downtown Train Rod Stewart
- 1991: For Our Children Disney
- 1991: Heart in Motion Amy Grant
- 1991: The Race Michael Omartian
- 1992: Countess Countess Vaughn
- 1992: Sarafina! The Sound of Freedom (original soundtrack)
- 1993: The Standard Carman
- 1993: Taking Heaven by Storm Steve Camp
- 1994: Christmas Spirit Donna Summer
- 1994: House of Love Amy Grant
- 1994: Kathy Troccoli Kathy Troccoli
- 1994: The Light Inside Gary Chapman
- 1994: Maverick (original soundtrack)
- 1994: Mercy in the Wilderness Steve Camp
- 1994: La Razon de Cantar First Call
- 1994: The Ride 4Him
- 1994: Sizzlin' Sounds Collection various artists
- 1994: Slow Revival Bryan Duncan
- 1995: Field of Souls Wayne Watson
- 1995: Helen Darling Helen Darling
- 1996: The Birdcage (original soundtrack)
- 1996: Come on Back Billy and Sarah Gaines
- 1996: Distant Call Susan Ashton
- 1996: The Message 4Him
- 1996: Mission Accomplished: Themes for Spies various artists
- 1996: Fade Into Light Boz Scaggs
- 1996: Shelter Gary Chapman
- 1996: Summer of '78 Barry Manilow
- 1997: Amazing Grace, Vol. 2: A Country Salute to Gospel various artists
- 1997: Let Us Pray: National Day of Prayer various artists
- 1997: The Way in a Manger: Country Christmas various artists
- 1998: Movies Greatest Love Songs various artists
- 1998: Obvious 4Him
- 1998: Breath of Heaven: A Christmas Collection Vince Gill
- 1998: The Way Home Wayne Watson
- 1999: A Christmas to Remember Amy Grant
- 1999: In the Moon of Wintertime: Christmas with Michael Crawford
- 1999: Learning to Breathe Larry Stewart
- 1999: Love Takes Time Bryan Duncan
- 1999: Touched by an Angel: The Christmas Album [original television soundtrack]
- 2000: Brand New Dream Danny Gans
- 2000: Hymns: A Place of Worship 4Him
- 2000: Organ-Ized: All-Star Tribute to the Hammond B3 Organ various artists
- 2001: Angel Eyes (original soundtrack)
- 2001: Another Perfect World Peter Cetera
- 2003: Pass the Love Larnelle Harris
- 2003: Cliff at Christmas Cliff Richard
- 2003: 24 Point of Grace
- 2003: Visible 4Him
- 2004: ‘70s: From Acoustic to the Wall of Sound Dion DiMucci
- 2004: Prayer That Changes Everything Stormie Omartian
- 2005: Christmas Reunion Tony Orlando & Dawn
- 2005: Something's Goin' On Cliff Richard
- 2006: Encore...For Future Generations 4Him
- 2006: Collections Kenny Loggins
- 2009: Where's Our Revolution Matt Brouwer
- 2009: Beloved Lara Landon
- 2010: Bold As Brass Cliff Richard

== Video ==
- 1983: Together Live [with 2nd Chapter of Acts]
- 1985: We Are the World (Synthesizer arranger, keyboardist)
- 1994: Amy Grant: Building the House of Love (musician)
- 1994: Maverick (performer: "Amazing Grace")
