= The Best of Christopher Cross =

Greatest hits album by Christopher Cross
- Released: October 21, 1991
- Recorded: 1979–1988
- Genre: Rock
- Length: 49:18
- Label: Warner Bros.
- Producer: Michael Omartian

Christopher Cross chronology
Back of My Mind (1988)	The Best of Christopher Cross (1991)	Rendezvous (1992)

Professional ratings
Review scores
Source	Rating
AllMusic	4.5/5 stars

The Best of Christopher Cross is the first greatest hits album by Christopher Cross. The album was released in 1991 and distributed by Warner Bros. Records.

In 1992, the album was re-released as Ride Like the Wind – The Best of Christopher Cross.. The album reached No. 58 in Germany and No. 19 in the Netherlands.

== Track listing ==
No.	Title	Writer(s)	Length
1.	"Ride Like the Wind"	Cross	4:32
2.	"All Right"	Cross	4:18
3.	"Someday"	Cross; Rob Meurer	3:12
4.	"Love Is Love (In Any Language)^{‡}"	Cross; Michael Omartian; John Bettis	4:27
5.	"Words of Wisdom"	Cross	5:52
6.	"Say You'll Be Mine"	Cross	2:53
7.	"Sailing"	Cross	4:14
8.	"Arthur's Theme (Best That You Can Do)"	Cross; Carole Bayer Sager; Burt Bacharach; Peter Allen	3:53
9.	"Any Old Time"	Cross; Bettis	4:05
10.	"Charm the Snake"	Cross; Omartian	4:22
11.	"Every Turn of the World"	Cross; Omartian; Bettis	4:02
12.	"That Girl"	Cross; Bettis	3:28
Total length:			49:18

^{‡} - Listed as "Love Is Love"

== Charts ==
Chart (1992)	Peak position
Dutch Albums (Album Top 100)	19
German Albums (Offizielle Top 100)	58
