= Walking in Avalon =

Studio album by Christopher Cross
- Released: September 7, 1998
- Recorded: March 10, 1998
- Venues: Galaxy Theatre (Santa Ana, California) with Design FX Remote Recording (Los Angeles, California)
- Studios: Christopher's place and Orange Who Recording (Santa Barbara, California); Bleach Bros. Studios (Woodland Hills, California); Capitol Records (Hollywood, California); Your Place Or Mine (Glendale, California); Saucer Sound (Austin, Texas)
- Genre: Soft rock
- Length: 1:55:08
- Labels: CMC International; Ariola
- Producers: Christopher Cross; Rob Meurer; Scott Frankfurt

Christopher Cross chronology
Window (1994)	Walking in Avalon (1998)	The Very Best of Christopher Cross (2002)

Professional ratings
Review scores
Source	Rating
Allmusic	2/5 stars

Walking in Avalon, Christopher Cross’s seventh album released in 1998, is a double album package that contains Cross' latest new studio album and Greatest Hits Live album together. It is distributed by CMC International. In late 1999, CMC re-released the package as two single-album releases. The studio album is entitled Red Room, and the hits live release is Christopher Cross - Greatest Hits Live.

== Writing and production ==
Written and produced with Rob Meurer, and featuring multi-instrumentalist/co-producer Scott Frankfurt, the two-CD set comprises music.

The first record of new compositions by Cross and Meurer. Backing tracks created by Frankfurt and orchestral settings by Jeremy Lubbock are included.

The second record is a 74-minute live concert recording in which Cross performs nearly all of his earlier hits (including "Sailing", "Ride Like the Wind", "Arthur's Theme (Best That You Can Do)", and "Think of Laura") as well as a number of his lesser-known mid-period songs. Through a printing error, the band credits for this concert were omitted from the CD notes.

Besides Cross on vocals and guitar, featured are Rob Meurer (keyboards, dulcimer, vocals), Chas Thompson (bass, vocals), Gigi Worth (percussion, guitar, vocals), Kiki Ebsen (keyboards, vocals), and Jody Cortez (drums), with Joel Peskin on alto saxophone and a special guest appearance by Michael McDonald.

== Track listing ==
=== Disc 1 ===
1. "In a Red Room"
2. "Walking in Avalon"
3. "Hunger"
4. "When She Smiles"
5. "It's Always Something"
6. "Dream Too Loud"
7. "I Know You Well "
8. "Kind of I Love You"
9. "Curled Around the World"
10. "Rainy Day in Vancouver"

=== Disc 2 (Live) ===
1. "Rendezvous"
2. "Never Be the Same"
3. "Back of My Mind"
4. "Sailing"
5. "Every Turn of the World"
6. "Deputy Dan"
7. "In the Blink of an Eye"
8. "Swept Away"
9. "Think of Laura"
10. "Minstrel Gigolo"
11. "Open Up My Window"
12. "Alibi"
13. "Is There Something"
14. "Arthur's Theme"
15. "Ride Like the Wind"
16. "All Right"

== See also ==
- Back to Avalon
