= '50s progression =

Chord progression and a turnaround used in Western popular music

A '50s progression in C

The '50s progression (also known as the "Heart and Soul" chords, the "Stand by Me" changes, the doo-wop progression and the "ice cream changes") is a chord progression and turnaround used in Western popular music. The progression, represented in Roman numeral analysis, is I–vi–IV–V. For example, in C major: C–Am–F–G. As the name implies, it was common in the 1950s and early 1960s and is particularly associated with doo-wop.

== Theory ==
In Western classical music during the common practice period, chord progressions are used to structure a musical composition. The destination of a chord progression is known as a cadence, or two chords that signify the end or prolongation of a musical phrase. The most conclusive and resolving cadences return to the tonic or I chord; following the circle of fifths, the most suitable chord to precede the I chord is a V chord. This particular cadence, V–I, is known as an authentic cadence. However, since a I–V–I progression is repetitive and skips most of the circle of fifths, it is common practice to precede the dominant chord with a suitable predominant chord, such as a IV chord or a ii chord (in major), in order to maintain interest. In this case, the '50s progression uses a IV chord, resulting in the ubiquitous I–IV–V–I progression. The vi chord before the IV chord in this progression (creating I–vi–IV–V–I) is used as a means to prolong the tonic chord, as the vi or submediant chord is commonly used as a substitute for the tonic chord, and to ease the voice leading of the bass line: in a I–vi–IV–V–I progression (without any chordal inversions) the bass voice descends in major or minor thirds from the I chord to the vi chord to the IV chord.

== Variations ==
As with any other chord progression, there are many possible variations, for example turning the dominant or V into a V^{7}, or repeated I–vi progression followed by a single IV–V progression. A very common variation is having ii substitute for the subdominant, IV, creating the progression I–vi–ii–V (a variant of the circle progression) and thus the ii–V–I turnaround.

50s progression in C – harmonic rhythm
two beat
four beat
eight beat

variable

Variations include switching the vi and the IV chord to create I–IV–vi–V, as is used in "More Than a Feeling" by Boston and "She Drives Me Crazy" by Fine Young Cannibals. This is also similar to the I–V–vi–IV progression.

The harmonic rhythm, or the pace at which the chords occur, may be varied including two beats (half-measure) per chord, four (full measure or bar), eight (two measures), and eight beats per chord except for IV and V^{(7)} which get four each.

"Sleep Walk" by Santo & Johnny uses a similar progression, with the IV replaced by its parallel minor iv for an overall progression of I–vi–iv–V.

Other variations of this chord progression used in popular music include the similar ii–V–I–vi and IV–V–I–vi. Examples of songs that used them include “Vanish into You” by Lady Gaga and “White Mercedes” by Charli XCX.

== Examples in popular music ==
This is a partial list of recorded songs containing the '50s progression. The list does not include songs containing the progression for very short, irrelevant sections of the songs. In some cases, such as "Blue Moon", it includes notable remade recordings of songs ("covers") by other artists; but mostly the songs are shown in their original versions.

Title	Artist	Year	Progression
"A Hundred Pounds of Clay"	Gene McDaniels	1960	I–vi–IV–V
"A Teenager in Love"	Dion and the Belmonts; Doc Pomus, Mort Shuman (writers)	1959	I–vi–IV–V
"Angel Baby"	Rosie and the Originals	1960	I–vi–IV–V
"Ano Ko ni Touch"	The Blue Hearts	1991	I–vi–IV–V
"Aku Yang Tersakiti"	Judika	2010	I–vi–IV–V
Aku Cinta Padamu	Siti Nurhaliza	1997	ii–V–I–vi
"All I Have to Do Is Dream"	The Everly Brothers	1958	I–vi–IV–V
"All Right"	Christopher Cross	1983	I–vi–ii–V
"Baby"	Justin Bieber	2010	I–vi–IV–V
"Baby Doll"	The Buttertones	2016	I–vi–IV–V
"Bad Girl"	The Detroit Cobras	1996	I–vi–IV–V
"Bau Bau Bau"	Project Pop	2003	I–vi–IV–V
"Baby, I'm an Anarchist!"	Against Me!	2002	I–vi–IV–V
"Beautiful Girls"	Sean Kingston	2007	I–vi–IV–V
"Beyond the Sea"	Jack Lawrence and Charles Trenet	1946	I–vi–IV–V
"Blank Space"	Taylor Swift	2014	I–vi–IV–V (verses)
"Bleeding Love"	Leona Lewis	2007	I–vi–IV–V
"Blue Moon"	The Marcels	1961	I–vi–IV–V
"Bobby Brown"	Frank Zappa	1979	I–vi–IV–V
"Body Feels EXIT"	Namie Amuro	1995	vi–IV–V–I
"Body Say"	Demi Lovato	2016	IV–V–I–vi (chorus)
"Bola Mata Sayu"	DNANDA	2025	I–vi–IV–V
"Boom Clap"	Charli XCX	2014	IV–V–I–vi
"Boyband"	Tipe-X	2012	I–vi–IV–V
"Boys (Summertime Love)"	Sabrina	1987	IV–V–I–vi (pre-chorus)
"Boyfriend"	Boyfriend	2011	I–vi–IV–V
"Brave"	Sara Bareilles	2013	I–vi–IV–V (verse and chorus)
"Brave as a Noun"	Andrew Jackson Jihad	2007	I–vi–IV–V
"Bristol Stomp"	The Dovells	1961	I–vi–IV–V
"Breaking Up Is Hard To Do"	Neil Sedaka	1962	I–vi–IV–V
"Brokenhearted"	Karmin	2012	I–vi–IV–V
"Burberry Headband"	Lil Mosey	2018	I–vi–IV–V
"C.h.a.o.s.m.y.t.h."	One Ok Rock	2011	I–vi–IV–V
"Capital Radio"	The Clash	1977	I–vi–IV–V
"Christmas (Baby Please Come Home)"	Darlene Love	1963	I–vi–IV–V
"Chain Gang"	Sam Cooke	1960	I–vi–IV–V
"Close Your Eyes"	Meghan Trainor	2014	I–vi–IV–V
"Cobalah untuk Setia"	Krisdayanti	2004	I–vi–IV–V
"Complicated"	Avril Lavigne	2002	I–vi–IV–V (verses)
"Coney Island Baby"	The Excellents	1962	I–vi–IV–V
"Cradle Rock"	The Heartbreakers (Ray Collins/ Frank Zappa)	1963	I–vi–IV–V
"Crocodile Rock"	Elton John	1972	I–vi–IV–V
"Cupid"	Fifty Fifty	2023	ii–V–I–vi
"Can't Stop Lovin' You"	Van Halen	1995	I–vi–IV–V
"Da Doo", "Dentist"	Little Shop of Horrors (musical) Original Broadway Cast	1982	I–vi–IV–V
"Dance with Me Tonight"	Olly Murs	2011	I–vi–IV–V
"Dear Future Husband"	Meghan Trainor	2015	I–vi–IV–V
"Demi Waktu"	Ungu	2005	I–vi–IV–V
"Di Dadaku Ada Kamu"	Vina Panduwinata	1984	ii–V–I–vi
"Diana"	Paul Anka	1957	I–vi–IV–V
"Donna"	Ritchie Valens	1958	I–vi–IV–V
"Don't Dream It's Over"	Crowded House	1986	IV–V–I–vi
"Don't Dream It, Be It"	The Rocky Horror Picture Show	1975	I–vi–IV–V
"Don't Say Your Love Is Killing Me"	Erasure	1997	I–vi–IV–V
"Double Shot (Of My Baby's Love)"	The Swingin' Medallions	1966	I–vi–IV–V
"Duke of Earl"	Gene Chandler	1962	I–vi–IV–V
"Dura"	Daddy Yankee	2018	I–vi–IV–V
"D'yer Mak'er"	Led Zeppelin	1973	I–vi–IV–V
"Earth Angel"	The Penguins	1954	I–vi–IV–V
"Endless Mine"	Sega	1994	I−vi−IV−V
"Enola Gay (song)"	Orchestral Manoeuvres in the Dark	1980	I–vi–IV–V
"Epiphany"	BTS	2018	I–vi–IV–V
"Escape From The City"	Ted Poley	2001	I–vi–IV–V
"Eternal Flame"	The Bangles/Atomic Kitten	1989/2001	I–vi–IV–V
"Every Breath You Take"	The Police	1983	I–vi–IV–V
"Eyes of Blue"	Paul Carrack	1995	I–vi–IV–V
"Eyes on Me"	Faye Wong	1999	I–vi–IV–V
"Flightless Bird, American Mouth"	Iron & Wine	2007	I–vi–IV–V
"Flying Without Wings"	Westlife	1999	I–vi–IV–V
"For Your Precious Love"	Jerry Butler	1958	I–vi–IV–V
"Friday"	Rebecca Black	2011	I–vi–IV–V
"Give a Little Love"	Bay City Rollers	1975	I–vi–IV–V
"Go Cry On Somebody Else's Shoulder"	The Mothers of Invention	1966	I–vi–IV–V
"Girl on Fire"	Alicia Keys	2011	I–vi–IV–V
"God Is in the Rhythm"	King Gizzard & the Lizard Wizard	2015	I–vi–IV–V
"Hang Fire"	The Rolling Stones	1981	I–vi–IV–V
"Hangin' Out with Jim"	GG Allin	1988	I–vi–IV–V
"Happiness Is a Warm Gun"	The Beatles	1968	I–vi–IV–V
"Have It All"	Jason Mraz	2018	I–vi–IV–V
"Hazure03"	Kazumi Totaka (Animal Crossing: New Horizons)	2020	I–vi–ii–V
"Heart and Soul"	Larry Clinton feat. Bea Wain	1938	I–vi–IV–V
"Hero"	Enrique Iglesias	2001	I–vi–IV–V
"I'll Be Missing You"	Puff Daddy feat. Faith Evans & 112	1997	I–vi–IV–V
"I'll Make Love to You"	Boyz II Men	1994	I–vi–IV–V
"I'm the One"	DJ Khaled	2017	I–vi–IV–V
"I'm Waiting for the Day"	The Beach Boys	1966	I–vi–IV–V
"I Always Knew"	The Vaccines	2012	I–vi–IV–V
"I Love You Too Much"	The Book of Life (soundtrack)	2014	I–vi–IV–V
"I Think They Call This Love"	Elliot James Reay	2024	I–vi–ii–V
"Ima, Kimi wo Omou"	HKT48	2014	vi–IV–V–I
"In the Aeroplane Over the Sea"	Neutral Milk Hotel	1998	I–vi–IV–V
"In the Shape of a Heart"	Jackson Browne	1986	I–vi–IV–V
"In the Still Of the Night"	The Five Satins	1956	I–vi–IV–V
"I Wanna Be With You"	The Raspberries	1974	I–vi–IV–V
"I Will Always Love You"	Dolly Parton / Whitney Houston	1974/1992	I–vi–IV–V
"J'en ai marre!"	Alizée	2003	IV–V–I–vi
"Jesus of Suburbia"	Green Day	2004	I–vi–IV–V
"Joey"	Concrete Blonde	1990	I–vi–IV–V
"Just One Look"	Doris Troy "	1963	I–vi–IV–V
"Judas"	Lady Gaga	2011	IV–V–I–vi
"Just the Way You Are"	Bruno Mars	2010	I–vi–IV–I
"Kimberly"	Patti Smith	1975	I–vi–IV–V
"Last Kiss"	Wayne Cochran	1961	I–vi–IV–V
"Looking for an Echo"	Kenny Vance / Ol' 55	1975/1976	I–vi–IV–V
"Lollipop"	Ronald & Ruby	1958	I–vi–IV–V
"Lonely This Christmas"	Mud	1974	I–vi–IV–V
"Lovable"	Sam Cooke	1956	I–vi–IV–V
"Love Hurts"	The Everly Brothers / Nazareth	1960/1974	I–vi–IV–V
"Lucky"	Britney Spears	2000	I–vi–IV–V
"Lupa Lupa Ingat"	Kuburan	2009	I–vi–ii–V
"Making Love Out Of Nothing At All"	Air Supply	1982	I–vi–IV–V
"Mama I'm A Big Girl Now"	Hairspray Original Broadway Cast	2002	I–vi–IV–V
"Mandy"	Barry Manilow	1974	I–vi–IV–V
"Marathon"	Tennis	2011	I–vi–IV–V
"Marvin Gaye"	Charlie Puth and Meghan Trainor	2015	I–vi–IV–V
"Me!"	Taylor Swift ft. Brendon Urie	2019	I–vi–IV–V
"Messin' Around"	Pitbull	2016	I–vi–IV–V
"Million Reasons"	Lady Gaga	2016	I–vi–IV–V
"Modern Girl"	Sleater Kinney	2005	I–vi–IV–V
"Monster Mash"	Bobby Pickett	1962	I–vi–IV–V
"Mr. Bass Man"	Johnny Cymbal	1961	I–vi–IV–V
"My Broken Friend"	John DiMaggio featuring Beck	2001	I–vi–IV–V
"Never Be the Same"	Christopher Cross	1980	I–vi–ii–V
"No Hay Pedo"	Banda Los Recoditos	2014	I–vi–IV–V
"Nothing's Gonna Stop Us Now"	Starship	1987	I–vi–IV–V
"Number One For Me"	Maher Zain	2012	I–vi–IV–V
"Octopus's Garden"	The Beatles	1969	I–vi–IV–V
"Oh, Pretty Woman"	Roy Orbison; Roy Orbison, Bill Dees (writers)	1964	I–vi–IV–V
"Oh True Love"	Everly Brothers	1960	I–vi–IV–V
"Oliver's Army"	Elvis Costello	1979	I–vi–IV–V
"Perfect"	Ed Sheeran	2017	I–vi–IV–V
"Perfidia"	Alberto Domínguez, Glenn Miller	1939	I–vi–ii–V
"Please Mr. Postman"	The Marvelettes	1961	I–vi–IV–V
"Pretty Little Angel Eyes"	Curtis Lee	1961	I–vi–IV–V
Primadonna	Marina	2012	ii–V–I–vi
"Prove It"	Television	1977	I–vi–IV–V
"Rainbow"	Kesha	2017	I–vi–IV–V
"Red Cadillac and a Black Moustache"	Warren Smith	1957	I–vi–IV–V
"Rinky Dink"	Dave "Baby" Cortez/ Booker T & the MGs	1962	I–vi–IV–V
Ripped Pants	SpongeBob SquarePants	1999	I–vi–IV–V
"Rude"	Magic!	2013	IV–V–I–vi
"Runaround Sue"	Dion	1961	I–vi–IV–V
"Saat Saat Indah"	Nani Sugianto	1987	I–vi–IV–V
"Saturday Night"	The Misfits	1999	I–vi–IV–V
"Sejauh Mungkin"	Ungu	2005	I–vi–IV–V
"Senin Wage"	Nyonya Ayu	2020	I–vi–IV–V
"Seperti Yang Dulu"	Ungu	2005	IV–vi–IV–V
"Som Sarn"	Loso	1998	I–vi–IV–V
"Stand by Me"	Ben E. King	1961	I–vi–IV–V
"Suara (Ku Berharap)"	Hijau Daun	2008	I–vi–IV–V (verse)
"Surti Tejo"	Jamrud	2000	I–vi–IV–V
"Sweat (A La La La La Long)"	Inner Circle	1992	I–vi–ii–V
"Sympathique"	Pink Martini	1997	I–vi–ii–V
"Schifoan"	Wolfgang Ambros	1976	I–vi–IV–V
"Takaramono"	The Blue Hearts	1993	I–vi–IV–V
"Telephone Line"	Electric Light Orchestra	1976	I–vi–IV–V
"Tell Me Why"	The Beatles	1964	I–vi–IV–V
"The KKK Took My Baby Away"	Ramones	1981	I–vi–IV–V
"The Man Comes Around"	Johnny Cash	2002	I–vi–IV–V
"The Thin Ice"	Pink Floyd	1979	I–vi–IV–V
"This Boy"	The Beatles	1963	I–vi–ii–V
"This is Me"	Keala Settle	2018	I–vi–IV–V
"This Magic Moment"	The Drifters	1960	I–vi–IV–V
"Those Magic Changes"	Sha Na Na	1978	I–vi–IV–V
"(Tired Of) Toein' The Line"	Rocky Burnette	1980	I–vi–IV–V
"Title Theme"	Hirokazu Tanaka (Dr. Mario)	1990	I–vi–IV–V
"Total Eclipse of the Heart"	Bonnie Tyler	1983	I–vi–IV–V
"Tous les garçons et les filles"	Françoise Hardy	1962	I–vi–IV–V
"Twistin' the Night Away"	Sam Cooke	1962	I–vi–IV–V
"True Blue"	Madonna	1986	I–vi–IV–V
"Unchained Melody"	The Righteous Brothers	1955	I–vi–IV–V
"Victoria's Secret"	Jax	2022	I–vi–IV–V
"Viva la Vida"	Coldplay	2008	IV–V–I–vi
"Walking in Memphis"	Marc Cohn	1991	IV–V–I–vi
"We Almost Had A Baby"	Emmy the Great	2009	I–vi–IV–V
"We Are Young"	Fun ft. Janelle Monáe	2011	I–vi–IV–V
"We Go Together"	John Travolta and Olivia Newton-John	1972	I–vi–IV–V
"Where Have All the Flowers Gone?"	Pete Seeger	1955	I–vi–IV–V
"Who Put the Bomp (in the Bomp, Bomp, Bomp)"	Barry Mann	1961	I–vi–IV–V
"Why Do Fools Fall in Love"	Frankie Lymon & The Teenagers	1956	I–vi–IV–V
"You Don't Own Me"	Lesley Gore	1963	I–vi–IV–V (chorus)
"Your Reality"	Dan Salvato	2017	I–vi–IV–V

== Examples in classical music ==
Instances of the I–vi–IV–V progression date back to the 17th century, for example, the ostinato bass line of Dieterich Buxtehude's setting of Psalm 42, Quem admodum desiderat cervus, BuxWV 92:

Buxtehude, Psalm 42 "Quem ad modum desiderat cervis"

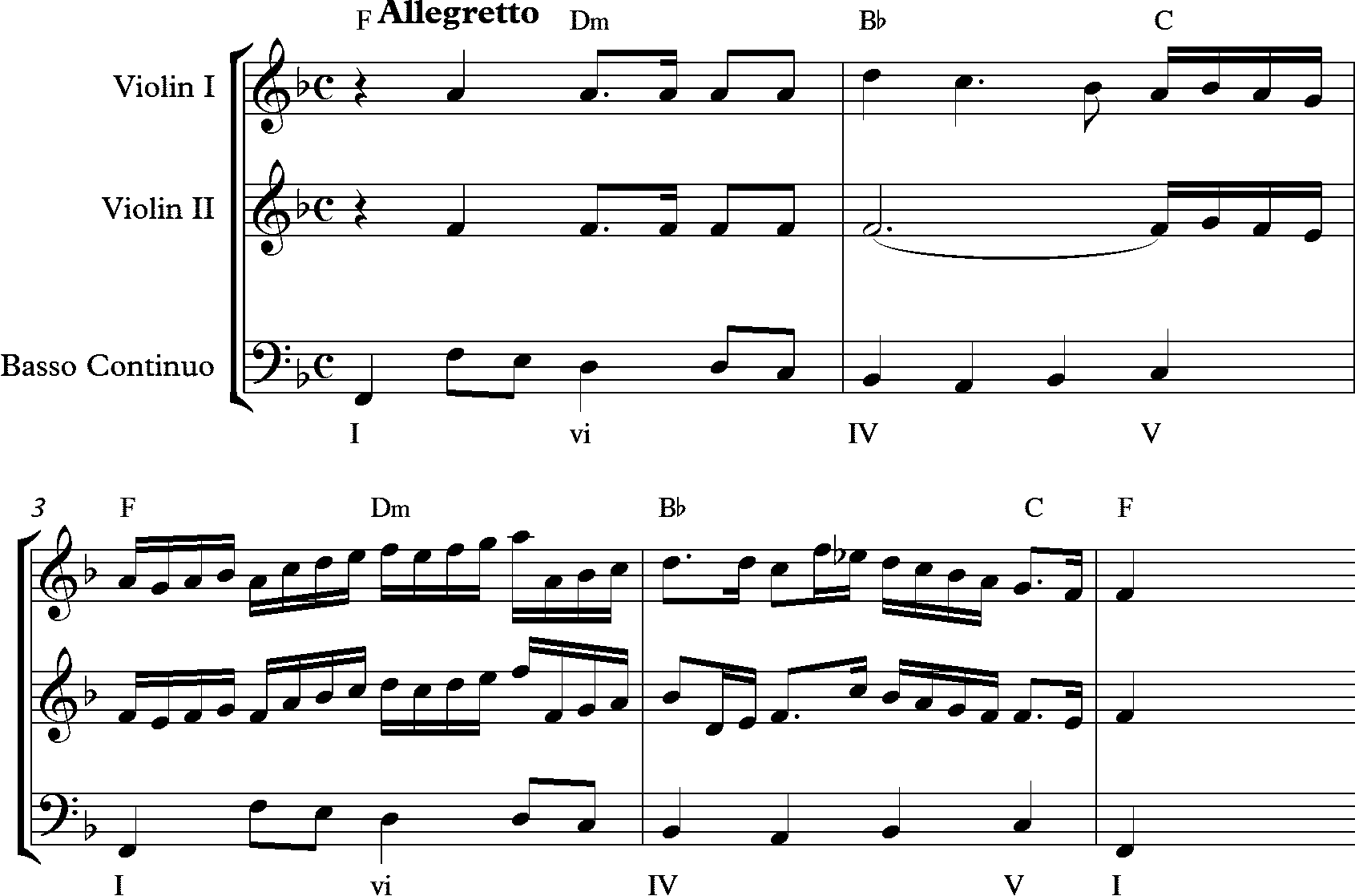
Buxtehude, Psalm 42 "Quem ad modum desiderat cervis"

The opening of J. S. Bach's Cantata "Wachet Auf":

J. S. Bach Cantata BWV140, orchestral introduction to the opening chorus

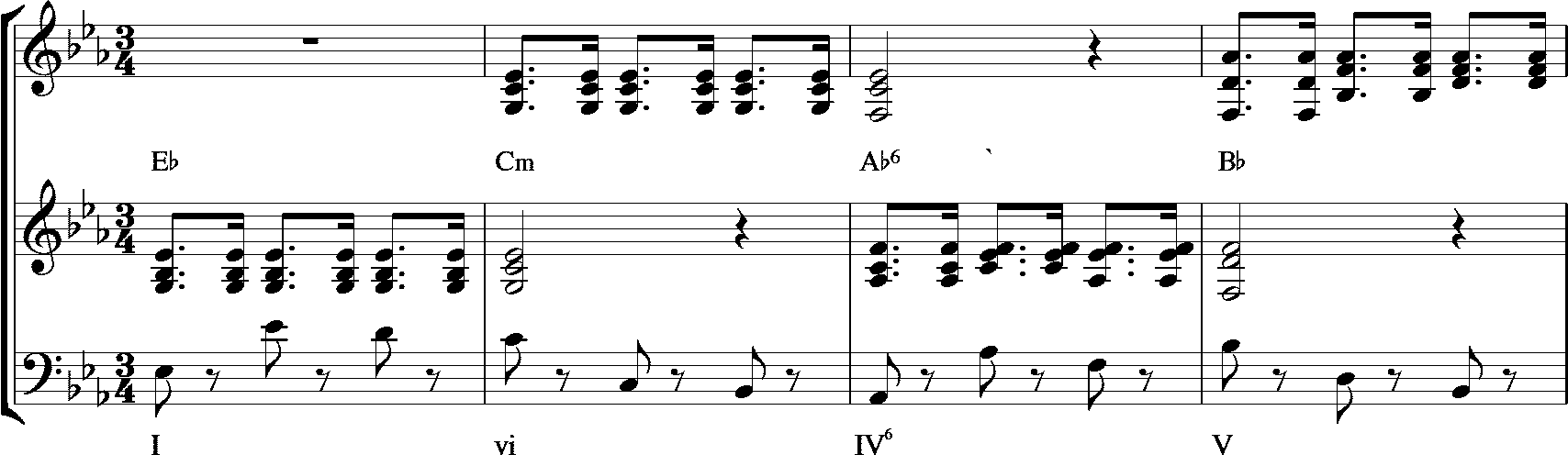
J. S. Bach Cantata BWV140, orchestral introduction to the opening chorus

The progression is found frequently in works by Mozart. At the end of the slow movement of his Piano Concerto No. 24, K. 491, the progression is spelled out in arpeggios played by the bassoon:

Mozart, Piano Concerto K. 491, closing bars of the slow movement

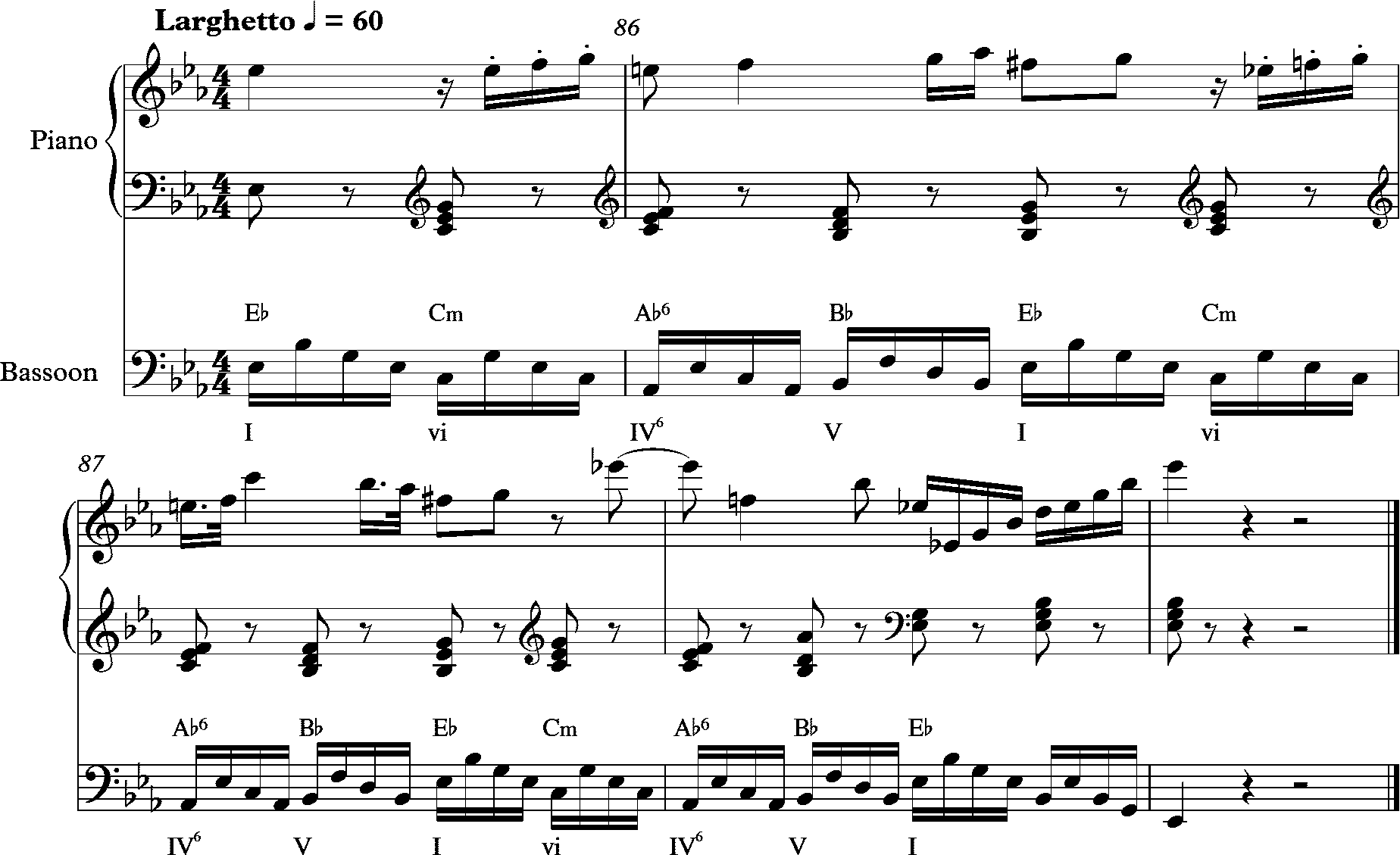
Mozart, Piano Concerto K. 491, closing bars of the slow movement

The opening of his Piano Concerto No. 22, K. 482 extends the progression in a particularly subtle way, making use of suspensions:

Mozart Piano Concerto K. 482, opening bars

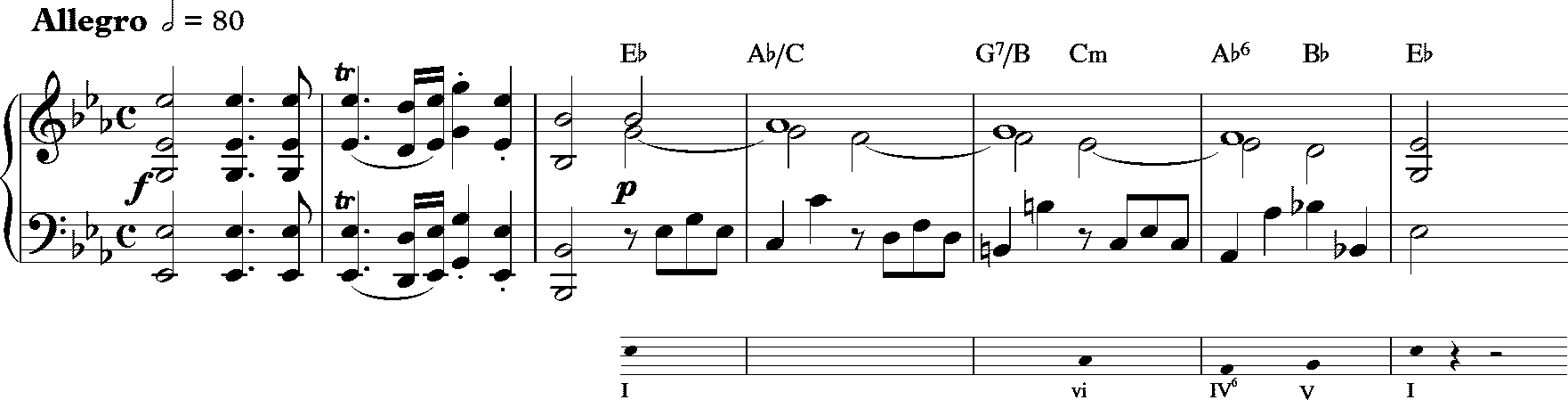
Mozart Piano Concerto K. 482, opening bars

Eric Blom (1935, p. 227) hears this passage as "the height of cunning contrivance resulting in what is apparently quite simple and obvious, but what could have occurred to nobody else."

== See also ==
- I–V–vi–IV progression
- Pachelbel's Canon
