= Every Turn of the World =

Studio album by Christopher Cross
- Released: November 4, 1985
- Recorded: April–August 1985
- Studios: Lion Share Studios (Los Angeles); Pop 'n' Roll Studios (Santa Monica)
- Genres: Pop rock; soft rock
- Length: 41:30
- Label: Warner Bros.
- Producer: Michael Omartian

Christopher Cross chronology
Another Page (1983)	Every Turn of the World (1985)	Back of My Mind (1988)

Singles from Every Turn of the World
- 1. "Charm the Snake" Released: October 14, 1985; 2. "Every Turn of the World" Released: 1985; 3. "That Girl" Released: 1985; 4. "Love Is Love (In Any Language)" Released: 1986

Professional ratings
Review scores
Source	Rating
Allmusic	2/5 stars

Every Turn of the World is the third studio album by Christopher Cross, recorded and released in 1985. The album has a harder rocking sound, lacking the pop ballads that dominated the sound of Cross's previous albums. The album peaked at No. 127 on the Billboard 200, while the single "Charm the Snake" peaked at No. 68 on the Billboard Hot 100, the only single to chart from the album. Three other singles, the title track, "That Girl", "Love Is Love (In Any Language)", were also released. Eventually, Every Turn of the World became the final album to be released on Warner Bros. Records before Cross signed to Reprise Records for his succeeding album, Back of My Mind. It also became the final album by Cross to chart in the Billboard 200.

== Reception ==
Billboard described Every Turn of the World as continuing Christopher Cross’s established blend of rhythmic pop songs and ballads, noting that many of the tracks were co-written with lyricists John Bettis and Will Jennings, adding greater lyrical depth. The review was critical of the lead single “Charm the Snake”, but identified the title track as a strong candidate for follow-up single release. While the album was viewed as less impactful than Cross’s debut, Billboard acknowledged that his previous release still produced successful singles, including “All Right” and “Think of Laura.”

William Ruhlmann of AllMusic noted that following the commercial decline of Another Page, which was dominated by ballads, Christopher Cross adopted a more rock-oriented sound on Every Turn of the World. He highlighted the absence of Los Angeles session musicians and backing vocals from prominent Southern California pop singers, with Cross instead using a SynthAxe and producer Michael Omartian contributing keyboards alongside a rhythm section. The album featured mostly up-tempo tracks with "save-the-world" lyrical themes. Ruhlmann wrote that the change in direction "didn't work," citing the commercial underperformance of the lead single, "Charm the Snake", and the loss of Cross's core adult contemporary audience. He added that although songs like "Love Found a Home" were more in line with Cross’s earlier work, they were largely overlooked, and the album was ultimately a commercial failure.

== Track listing ==
All tracks are written by Christopher Cross, with additional writers noted.

Side one
No.	Title	Writer(s)	Length
1.	"Every Turn of the World"	Michael Omartian; John Bettis	4:02
2.	"Charm the Snake"	Omartian	4:22
3.	"I Hear You Call"	Omartian; Bettis	3:41
4.	"Don't Say Goodbye"	Bettis; Billy Alessi	3:32
5.	"It's You That Really Matters"	Will Jennings	3:59

Side two
No.	Title	Writer(s)	Length
6.	"Love Is Love (In Any Language)"	Omartian; Bettis	4:27
7.	"Swing Street"	Omartian; Jennings	4:14
8.	"Love Found a Home"		3:29
9.	"That Girl"	Bettis	3:28
10.	"Open Your Heart"	Jennings	5:39
Total length:			41:30

== Personnel ==
=== Musicians ===
- Christopher Cross – lead vocals, backing vocals, guitars, SynthAxe
- Michael Omartian – keyboards, synthesizers, horn arrangements
- Marcus Ryle – synthesizer programming
- Joe Chemay – bass
- John Robinson – drums
- Paulinho da Costa – congas (1)
- Gary Herbig – saxophone, saxophone solo (7, 10)
- Kim Hutchcroft – saxophone
- Jerry Hey – trumpet
- Chuck Findley – trumpet
- Gary Grant – trumpet
- Portia Griffin – backing vocals
- Vesta Williams – backing vocals
- Alexandra Brown – backing vocals
- Lynn Blythe Davis – backing vocals
- Khalig Glover – backing vocals
- Richard Marx – backing vocals

=== Technical ===
- Produced by Michael Omartian
- Engineered and mixed by John Guess
- Assistant engineer – Mark Linett
- Second engineers – Tom Fouce, Laura Livingston, and James Wofford
- Mastered by Steve Hall at Future Disc (Hollywood, CA)
- Production coordination – James Wofford
- Art direction and design – Jen McManus and Laura LiPuma
- Logo design – Margo Chase
- Photography – Steve Sakai
- Linguistics advisor – John Accomando

== Charts ==
Chart (1985)	Peak position
Dutch Albums (Album Top 100)	34
German Albums (Offizielle Top 100)	44
Swedish Albums (Sverigetopplistan)	37
US Billboard 200	127
