= No Time for Talk =

Single by Christopher Cross

from the album Another Page
- B-side: "Words of Wisdom"
- Released: April 15, 1983
- Recorded: 1982
- Genre: Pop rock, soft rock
- Length: 4:22
- Label: Warner Bros.
- Songwriter: Christopher Cross
- Producer: Michael Omartian

Christopher Cross singles chronology
"All Right" (1983)	"No Time for Talk" (1983)	"Think of Laura" (1983)

"No Time for Talk" is a song by American singer-songwriter Christopher Cross. It was produced by Michael Omartian. Released in April 1983 as the second single from his second album Another Page, it peaked at number 33 on the Billboard Hot 100 in June 1983. It is the third single by Cross to feature Michael McDonald, following "Ride Like the Wind" and "All Right".

There was also an instrumental version of this track in the film American Anthem, which was composed by Michael Omartian.

== Track listing ==
All tracks are written by Christopher Cross.

No.	Title	Length
1.	"No Time for Talk"	4:22
2.	"Words of Wisdom"	5:52

== Personnel ==
- Christopher Cross – vocals, guitars,
- Rob Meurer – keyboards, synthesizer programming, percussion, arrangements, synthesizer solo
- Michael Omartian – keyboards, percussion, arrangements, string arrangements and conductor
- Abraham Laboriel – bass
- Steve Gadd – drums
- Lenny Castro – percussion
- Paulinho da Costa – percussion
- Tom Scott – saxophone, sax solo
- Michael McDonald – backing vocals

== Charts ==
Chart (1983)	Peak position
US Billboard Hot 100	33
U.S. Radio & Records CHR/Pop Airplay Chart	26
