= Think of Laura =

Single by Christopher Cross

from the album Another Page
- B-side: "Words of Wisdom" (US); "Deal 'Em Again" (Japan)
- Released: July 1983
- Recorded: 1982
- Genre: Soft rock
- Length: 3:22
- Label: Warner Bros.
- Songwriter: Christopher Cross
- Producer: Michael Omartian

Christopher Cross singles chronology
"No Time for Talk" (1983)	"Think of Laura" (1983)	"A Chance for Heaven" (1984)

Music video
- "Christopher Cross - Think Of Laura (Official Music Video) [Remastered HD]" on YouTube

"Think of Laura" is a song by American singer-songwriter Christopher Cross. Released as a single in mid 1983 from Cross's second studio album Another Page, "Think of Laura" became the singer's fourth and, to date, final single to reach the top 10 on the Billboard Hot 100 chart, where it peaked at No. 9 in early 1984. The song spent eleven weeks in the top 40 (Cross's final top 40 hit).

The song became Cross's third single to hit No. 1 on the adult contemporary chart, following "Never Be the Same" and "Arthur's Theme (Best That You Can Do)". "Think of Laura" remained at No. 1 on this chart for four weeks. The song was written by Cross and produced by Michael Omartian.

== Background ==
Cross wrote the song to mourn the death of Denison University college student Laura Carter, who was killed in Columbus, Ohio, when she was struck by a stray bullet during gunfire in a gang war.

Carter, a lacrosse player from Wayne, Pennsylvania, was sitting in the back seat of her father's car. Her family was visiting for homecoming, and had just watched Laura and her friends compete in a lacrosse match.

Cross had met Carter through her college roommate Paige McNinch, whom Cross was dating at the time. McNinch is pictured on the inner sleeve of the Another Page album, sitting on a stool. Cross wrote the song as a way of offering comfort to McNinch, and honoring Carter's memory.

Carter's shooter, Gordon Newlin, served time for the shooting. He was released on parole in 2012, and died in 2020.

"Think of Laura" has a relatively straightforward arrangement, with the singer's vocals and a piano accompaniment. The lyrics express the sorrow felt by those who knew the woman but ask that she be remembered with happiness: When you think of Laura, laugh, don't cry / I know she'd want it that way.

== General Hospital ==
The song's chart popularity was enhanced by the ABC soap opera General Hospital. One of the program's supercouples, Luke and Laura, were quite popular, and the song came to be associated with the character Luke's love for Laura, who had been missing and presumed dead for many months. Notes of the song became a recurring motif as the character of Laura was mentioned, and eventually returned. When interest in the song grew because of its prominence on the show, it was released as a single.

According to Cross, ABC never officially licensed the track; it concluded that the use of only small fragments of it for a "ghosting effect" during scenes involving the character Laura Spencer did not require a license. Cross has stated that his team formally asked ABC to stop using the song, but the network refused.

== Personnel ==
- Christopher Cross – lead and backing vocals, flamenco guitar
- Michael Omartian – piano
- Rob Meurer – keyboards, synthesizer programming
- Andy Salmon – bass guitar
- Tommy Taylor – drums

== Charts ==
Chart (1984)	Peak position
Canada Top Singles (RPM)	9
US Billboard Hot 100	9
US Billboard Adult Contemporary	1

Year-end chart (1984)	Rank
Canada Top Singles (RPM)	79
US Top Pop Singles (Billboard)	83

== Cover versions ==
The song has been covered by American R&B group Boyz II Men, their version entitled "The Aaliyah Song", as a tribute to the late singer Aaliyah. It was also covered by Dominic & Burton in 2003 and by the Filipino band MYMP. French orchestra leader Paul Mauriat covered the song as its instrumental rendition on his 1984 album The Seven Seas. In 2023, French pianist Richard Clayderman covered the song in piano.

== See also ==
- List of Hot Adult Contemporary number ones of 1984
