= Swing Street (disambiguation) =

Swing Street is a 1987 studio album by Barry Manilow and the title song.

Swing Street may also refer to:

- "Swing Street", a 1985 song by Christopher Cross from the album Every Turn of the World
- 52nd Street (Manhattan), a street in Manhattan nicknamed "Swing Street"
