= Is There Something =

Single by Christopher Cross

from the album Rendezvous
- B-side: "Angry Young Men"
- Released: January 25, 1992
- Recorded: 1991
- Genre: Soft rock
- Length: 4:55 (album version); 3:58 (single version)
- Label: Ariola; Polystar
- Lyricists: Christopher Cross; Steve Dorff; Cynthia Weil
- Producers: Christopher Cross; Steve Dorff

Christopher Cross singles chronology
"In the Blink of an Eye" (1991)	"Is There Something" (1992)	"Nothing Will Change" (1992)

"Is There Something" is a song by Christopher Cross. It was released in January 1992 from his fifth album, Rendezvous. It was co-written by Steve Dorff, who co-produced the song with Cross and Cynthia Weil. The song features Toto drummer Jeff Porcaro. The song is the second single by Cross to be released on Ariola and Polystar Records. It is the third single by Cross to feature Porcaro on drums, following "Arthur's Theme" and "All Right".

== Personnel ==
- Christopher Cross – lead vocals, backing vocals, guitars
- Jeff Porcaro – drums
- Robbie Buchanan – keyboards, synth bass

== Cover versions ==
In 2009, Filipino singer Nina covered the song for her fifth album, Renditions of the Soul.
