= Back of My Mind =

Back of My Mind may refer to:

- Back of My Mind (Christopher Cross album), a 1988 album by Christopher Cross, or the title track
- Back of My Mind (H.E.R. album), a 2021 album by H.E.R., or the title track
