= Charm the Snake =

- American 1985 7″ cover

Single by Christopher Cross

from the album Every Turn of the World
- B-side: "Open Your Heart"
- Released: October 14, 1985
- Recorded: 1985
- Studio: Pop 'n' Roll Studios (Santa Monica, California)
- Genre: Dance-rock
- Length: 4:22 (album version); 3:50 (single version)
- Label: Warner Bros.
- Songwriters: Christopher Cross; Michael Omartian
- Producer: Michael Omartian

Christopher Cross singles chronology
"A Chance for Heaven" (1984)	"Charm the Snake" (1985)	"Every Turn of the World" (1985)

Alternative cover
- Japanese cover

"Charm the Snake" is a song written and recorded by American singer-songwriter Christopher Cross. It was co-written by the producer Michael Omartian. It was released on October 14, 1985 as the lead single and second song from his third album, Every Turn of the World. The single peaked at No. 68 on the Billboard Hot 100 and spent five weeks on the chart. It was the only track from the album to appear on the Billboard Hot 100 and also his final entry on that listing.

== Critical reception ==
Billboard described "Charm the Snake" as a "return of a consistent adult contemporary star," noting it has a grittier dance-oriented rock style than expected. The magazine also said that Cross' smooth tenor voice softens lyrics that are otherwise cynical.

== Music video ==
"Charm the Snake" received a music video that was directed by David Fincher and produced by Carol Stewart. The video was recorded at the Willow Springs International Motorsports Park. According to Billboard magazine, Cross had experience in a Formula Super Vee car for a couple of years and planned to go professional. In the music video, Cross drove a Formula Atlantic instead of a Super Vee because he felt that the larger tires found on Formula Atlantic cars looked more appealing.

== Personnel ==
- Christopher Cross – vocals, guitars, SynthAxe
- Michael Omartian – keyboards, synthesizers, horn arrangements
- Marcus Ryle – synthesizer programming
- Joe Chemay – bass guitar
- John Robinson – drums
- Alexandra Brown – backing vocals
- Lynn Davis – backing vocals
- Vesta Williams – backing vocals
- Richard Marx – backing vocals
- Khalig Glover – backing vocals
- Portia Griffin – backing vocals

== Chart performance ==
Chart (1985)	Peak position
US Billboard Hot 100	68
