= André Baruch =

French-American film narrator and radio announcer (1908–1991)

- Born: August 20, 1908; Paris, France
- Died: September 15, 1991 (aged 83); Beverly Hills, California, U.S.
- Education: Columbia University; Pratt Institute
- Occupation: Film narrator
- Spouse: Bea Wain (m. 1938)
- Children: 2

André Baruch (August 20, 1908 – September 15, 1991) was a French-American film narrator, radio announcer, news commentator, talk show host, disc jockey and sportscaster. He hosted radio programs from the 1940s to the 1980s with Bea Wain, his wife.

== Early life ==
Baruch was born on August 20, 1908, in Paris, France. When he was 12 years old, he came to Brooklyn, where he attended a public elementary school and had a newspaper route. his later jobs included working for a furniture company and several grocery-store chains. He obtained additional education at Manual Training High School, Columbia University, and Pratt Institute. He intended to become an illustrator before radio opportunities arose.

== Career ==
Baruch began his career as a pianist for WCGU, a Coney Island radio station. Later, he got into the wrong line of applicants at another station; he had entered the announcers' line and was hired on the spot. In the late 1930s Baruch was often the radio announcer for big band and other musical programs.

During World War II, Baruch served in the army and participated in the original invasion of North Africa, spending almost four years overseas and was honorably discharged as a major. Baruch was involved in the mid-1940s launching of the Armed Forces Radio Service, with stations in Algiers, Casablanca, Oran, Sicily and Tunis.

After World War II, Baruch and Wain worked as a disc jockey team in New York on WMCA, where they were billed as Mr. and Mrs. Music. Their show was later presented on the ABC and NBC networks.

On February 4, 1954, Baruch was selected to replace Red Barber as a broadcaster for the Brooklyn Dodgers on radio and TV. He called the team's home games in 1954 and 1955.

On radio, television or both, Baruch announced for such programs as The American Album of Familiar Music, The Fred Waring Show, The Kate Smith Show, The Shadow, Your Hit Parade and The United States Steel Hour.

In the 1960s, Baruch narrated short films for the Hamilton Wright Organization, an American public relations firm hired covertly by the South African government to counter the anti-apartheid movement.

In 1973, Baruch and Wain moved to Palm Beach, Florida, where they did a top-rated daily four-hour talk show on WPBR. Baruch was the host of the show and ran the control board. Wain on occasions asked him to play tape cartridges (a selection of about 12 hung in a metal rack on the wall to the right of Wain) of vintage songs she had once recorded, the most popular being "Deep Purple."

When the deep purple falls over sleepy garden walls
And the stars begin to twinkle in the sky—
In the mist of a memory you wander back to me
Breathing my name with a sigh...

After nine years in Palm Beach, Florida, at WPBR, Baruch and Wain relocated to Beverly Hills, California. During the early 1980s, the pair hosted a syndicated version of Your Hit Parade, reconstructing the list of hits of selected weeks in the 1940s and playing the original recordings.

Baruch died on September 15, 1991, in Beverly Hills.

== Personal life ==
He met singer Bea Wain while announcing for the Kate Smith Hour and they married in 1938.

Baruch and Wain had two children: Bonnie Baruch and Wayne Baruch. Bonnie and her husband Mark Barnes operate a vineyard in Northern California and run the Daisy Foundation, an organization which recognizes nurses for their critical role in patient care and supports research towards the cure of autoimmune diseases. Wayne Baruch has a career in the music and theatre business, and his wife, Shelley Baruch, is a theatrical producer and filmmaker.
