= Say You'll Be Mine (Christopher Cross song) =

Single by Christopher Cross

from the album Christopher Cross
- B-side: "Spinning"
- Released: March 14, 1981
- Recorded: 1979
- Length: 2:53
- Label: Warner Bros.
- Songwriter: Christopher Cross
- Producer: Michael Omartian

Christopher Cross singles chronology
"Never Be the Same" (1980)	"Say You'll Be Mine" (1981)	"Arthur's Theme (Best That You Can Do)" (1981)

"Say You'll Be Mine" is a song by American singer-songwriter Christopher Cross. Released on Warner Bros. Records from his self-titled debut studio album, it was the last single released on March 14, 1981. It features Nicolette Larson on backing vocals. It peaked at No. 20 on the Billboard Hot 100 and No. 15 on the Adult Contemporary chart. It is the shortest song and the opening track from the album, lasting around 2 minutes and 53 seconds.

"Say You'll Be Mine" had multiple B-sides when it was released as a single. For American and Australian issues, use "Spinning" as the B-side, while for Mexican and British issues, use "Poor Shirley" as the B-side for the single.

In 2025, "Say You'll Be Mine" was featured as a bonus track on a compilation album titled Look In My Direction: The Warner Bros. Recordings, which was released posthumously after Nicolette Larson's death.

== Personnel ==
- Christopher Cross – lead vocals, electric guitar, acoustic guitar, backing vocals
- Michael Omartian – acoustic piano
- Jay Graydon – guitar solo
- Andy Salmon – bass
- Tommy Taylor – drums
- Lenny Castro – percussion
- Nicolette Larson – backing vocals

== Charts ==
Chart (1981)	Peak position
Canada Top Singles (RPM)	33
US Billboard Hot 100	20
US Adult Contemporary (Billboard)	15
