= Another Page =

Studio album by Christopher Cross
- Released: January 31, 1983
- Recorded: 1982
- Studios: Warner Bros. Recording Studios (North Hollywood); The Pop 'n' Roll Playroom (Santa Monica); The Aspen Studios (Austin); Studio South (Austin)
- Genres: Soft rock, pop rock
- Length: 43:04
- Label: Warner Bros.
- Producer: Michael Omartian

Christopher Cross chronology
Christopher Cross (1979)	Another Page (1983)	Every Turn of the World (1985)

Singles from Another Page
- 1. "All Right" Released: January 5, 1983; 2. "No Time for Talk" Released: April 15, 1983; 3. "Think of Laura" Released: July 1983

Professional ratings
Review scores
Source	Rating
Allmusic	3/5 stars

Another Page is Christopher Cross's second studio album, recorded in 1982 and released in early 1983. It was not as commercially successful as its predecessor (it was certified Gold by the RIAA, but only after his self-titled debut album had already been certified Platinum by the time of the release of Another Page). The album reached number 1 in Japan in 1983.

The album is known for its two hit singles, "All Right" and "Think of Laura". "All Right" is the first single to be released from the album. And it became a massive hit in 1983, with it reaching No. 12 on the Billboard Hot 100, No. 3 on the Adult Contemporary chart, and No. 1 in the RPM adult contemporary charts. "Think of Laura" is dedicated to the Denison University college student Laura Carter, who was assassinated by Gordon Newlin when he shot a stray bullet at her during gunfire in a gang war. "Think of Laura" managed to become a No. 1 hit on the Adult Contemporary chart and No. 9 on the Billboard Hot 100. "Think of Laura" also was featured on the television soap opera General Hospital.

"Arthur's Theme (Best That You Can Do)" appeared as a bonus track on the cassette and later CD releases of the album.

== Reception ==
In his retrospective review, William Ruhlmann of AllMusic noted that Another Page closely followed the musical style of Christopher Cross's debut album, which had been a major commercial and critical success. Ruhlmann wrote that Another Page featured similarly smooth pop arrangements and romantic lyrics delivered in Cross's gentle, Brian Wilson-like tenor. Although the album lacked the emotional depth or edge of rock music, he stated that it was still commercially successful, producing two Top 40 hits—"All Right" and "No Time for Talk"—and earning a gold certification. Nearly a year after its release, the album gained renewed attention when the ballad "Think of Laura" was featured on the television soap opera General Hospital, leading to the song becoming a Top 10 hit.

== Track listing ==
All tracks are written by Christopher Cross, with additional writers noted.

Side one
No.	Title	Writer(s)	Length
1.	"No Time for Talk"		4:22
2.	"Baby Says No"		6:04
3.	"What Am I Supposed to Believe"		4:22
4.	"Deal 'Em Again"	Michael Maben	3:10
5.	"Think of Laura"		3:22

Side two
No.	Title	Length
6.	"All Right"	4:18
7.	"Talking in My Sleep"	3:34
8.	"Nature of the Game"	3:55
9.	"Long World"	3:32
10.	"Words of Wisdom"	5:52
Total length:		43:04

Cassette & CD releases only - Bonus Track
No.	Title	Writer(s)	Length
11.	"Arthur's Theme (Best That You Can Do)"	Burt Bacharach; Carole Bayer Sager; Peter Allen	3:52
Total length:			46:56

== Personnel ==
=== Musicians ===
- Christopher Cross – lead vocals, backing vocals, guitars, guitar solo (10), arrangements
- Michael Omartian – piano, keyboards, synthesizers, percussion, arrangements, string arrangements, conductor
- Rob Meurer – piano, keyboards, synthesizers, synthesizer programming, percussion, arrangements
- Steve Lukather – guitars, guitar solo (6)
- Jay Graydon – guitar solo (4)
- Abraham Laboriel – bass
- Andy Salmon – bass
- Mike Porcaro – bass
- Steve Gadd – drums
- Tommy Taylor – drums
- Jeff Porcaro – drums
- Paulinho da Costa – percussion
- Lenny Castro – percussion
- Tom Scott – saxophone (1)
- Ernie Watts – saxophone (3, 11)
- Assa Drori – concertmaster
- Michael McDonald – backing vocals (1, 6)
- Carl Wilson – backing vocals (2)
- Karla Bonoff – harmony vocals (3)
- Don Henley – backing vocals (4, 8)
- JD Souther – backing vocals (4, 8)
- Art Garfunkel – backing vocals (7)
- Flossy – Flamingo on cover

=== Technical ===
- Produced by Michael Omartian
- Assistant producers – Rob Meurer and Michael Ostin
- Engineered and mixed by Chet Himes
- Additional engineering – John Guess, Lee Herschberg, Mark Linett and Richard Mullen
- Assistant engineers – Stuart Gitlin and Margaret Gwynne
- Mastered by Bobby Hata at Warner Bros. Recording Studios. (North Hollywood, CA)
- Cover illustration – Louise Scott
- Lettering – Mike Manoogian
- Stylist – Laurie Warner
- Set styling – Frances Moore
- Photography – Matthew Rolston
- Art direction and design – Christine Sauers
- Management – Tim Neece and Irving Azoff (Front Line Management)

== Charts ==
=== Weekly charts ===
Chart (1983)	Peak position
Austrian Albums (Ö3 Austria)	18
Canada Top Albums/CDs (RPM)	23
Dutch Albums (Album Top 100)	7
German Albums (Offizielle Top 100)	2
New Zealand Albums (RMNZ)	9
Norwegian Albums (VG-lista)	7
Swedish Albums (Sverigetopplistan)	12
UK Albums (Official Charts)	4
US Billboard 200	11

=== Year-end charts ===
Chart (1983)	Position
Dutch Albums (Album Top 100)	44
German Albums (Offizielle Top 100)	33

== Certifications ==
Region	Certification	Certified units/sales
France (SNEP)	Gold	100,000^{*}
Germany (BVMI)	Gold	250,000^{^}
United Kingdom (BPI)	Gold	100,000^{^}
United States (RIAA)	Gold	500,000^{^}
^{*} Sales figures based on certification alone.^{^} Shipments figures based on certification alone.

== Singles ==
Year	Single	Chart	Position
1981	"Arthur's Theme (Best That You Can Do)"	Pop Singles	1
1983	"All Right"	Pop Singles	12
1983	"All Right"	Adult Contemporary	3
1983	"No Time for Talk"	Pop Singles	33
1983	"Think of Laura"	Pop Singles	9
1983	"Think of Laura"	Adult Contemporary	1
