= Heart and Soul (Frank Loesser and Hoagy Carmichael song) =

1938 song by Carmichael and Loesser

Song by Larry Clinton & his Orchestra, with Bea Wain
- Published: 1938
- Genre: Jazz
- Composer: Hoagy Carmichael
- Lyricist: Frank Loesser

"Heart and Soul" is a popular song composed by Hoagy Carmichael with lyrics by Frank Loesser. It charted with different artists between 1938 and 1961. A simplified version is a popular piano duet.

Larry Clinton and his Orchestra were the first to record and release the song in 1938 with Bea Wain on vocals.

== Musical format ==
The song's A-section is often simplified as a repeating I-vi-IV-V progression and taught to beginning piano students as an easy two-hand duet, with one person playing the chords and another playing the melody.

Like the piece "Chopsticks", this version became widely known, even to those who never studied piano, and is sometimes mistakenly thought to be a folk tune. The chord progression, often referred to as the "50s progression", was employed in the doo-wop hits of the 1950s and 1960s.

== Early versions ==
In 1938, it was first recorded on September 1 and released on September 21 by Larry Clinton and his Orchestra with vocals by Bea Wain on Victor Records. Their recording was the highest charting and most successful recording of the jazz and pop standard. Their performance was filmed for a Paramount Pictures film short and released in 1939.

That same year Al Bowlly recorded the song with Geraldo and his orchestra.

In 1939, three versions reached the music charts: Larry Clinton (No. 1), Eddy Duchin (No. 12), and Al Donahue (No. 16). A version by The Four Aces with the Jack Pleis Orchestra reached No. 11 in 1952, and a version by Johnny Maddox reached No. 57 in 1956. In 1961, The Cleftones version reached No. 18 and the one by Jan and Dean reached No. 25.

== The Cleftones version ==
"Heart and Soul"
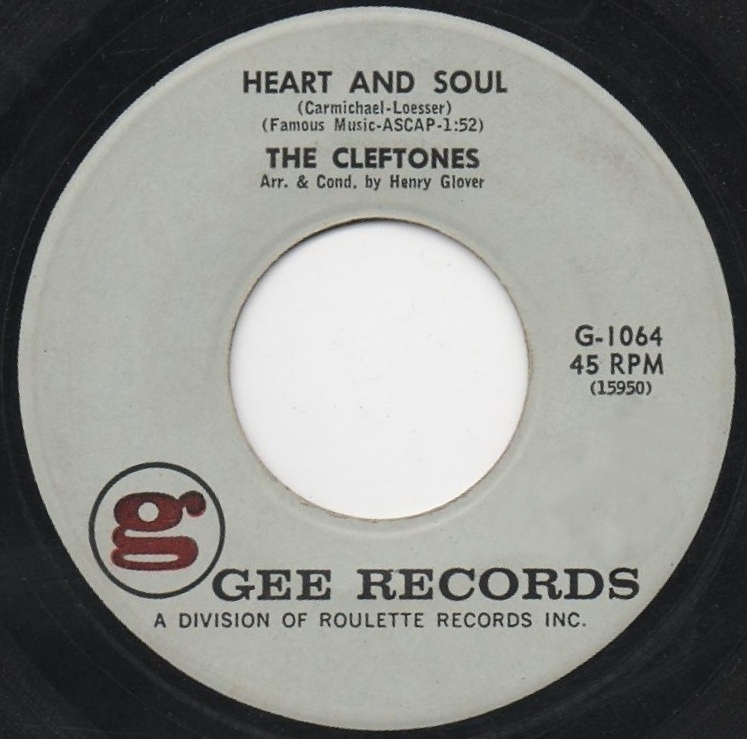

Single by The Cleftones
- B-side: "How Do You Feel?"
- Released: April 17, 1961
- Recorded: 1959, Rochester, New York
- Genre: Rhythm and blues, doo-wop
- Length: 1:52
- Label: Gee (1064)
- Composer: Hoagy Carmichael
- Lyricist: Frank Loesser
- Producer: George Goldner

The Cleftones singles chronology
"Shadows on the Very Last Row/She's Gone" (1960)	"Heart and Soul" (1961)	"For Sentimental Reasons/Deed I Do" (1961)

The Cleftones succeeded with a rhythm and blues rearrangement of the song in 1961. After the release on April 17, 1961, "Heart and Soul" reached number 18 on the Billboard Hot 100 in July of that year, making this song The Cleftones' most popular work.

In 1959, the Cleftones' manager, George Goldner, convinced the group that their future resided in re-recording existing songs with an established popularity. By this time, Charles James had grown more proficient on the guitar, and the group and Goldner used that to develop a new arrangement of the piece.

At that time, a local prominent disc jockey set up a recording session in Rochester, New York, to record "Heart and Soul" and, arranged for singer Pat Spann's boyfriend Panama Francis to play drums and 15-year-old/future Grammy Award winner Duane Hitchings to play keyboards. At the recording session, the group was presented with a rearrangement of "Heart and Soul" that was more formal than they had practiced. The group added unexpected rhythms to give the song a syncopated feel.

"Heart and Soul" sat undistributed until 1961. In early April of that year, Roulette Records president Morris Levy reactivated New York-based American record label Gee Records as a division of Roulette Records and made "Heart and Soul" the reactivated label's first release. That same month, American news magazine Billboard Music Week review panel listed "The Cleftones; Heart and Soul (Famous, ASCAP) (1:52) Gee" as one of seventeen "Pick Hits" from all songs released in the week of April 17, 1961. Under its "Spotlight Winners of the Week" column, Billboard identified the song as having the strongest sales potential of all records reviewed for the week, commenting on The Cleftones and "Heart and Soul",

This was a hit group a few seasons back and this rendition could bring them back into action. It's the standard tune and it's done in rocking, teen-slanted fashion with a swinging beat. This could happen. Flip is "How Do You Feel" (Tyrol, BMI) (2:00) Gee 1064."

On July 3, 1961, "Heart and Soul" reached number 18 on the Billboard Hot 100, and No. 10 on the Billboard Hot 100 R&B chart. The recording eventually sold approximately 350,000 copies for Gee/Roulette.

In 1973, the Cleftones version was used in the movie American Graffiti. It is also featured in the 1985 coming-of-age comedy Mischief.

Music critic Terry Atkinson of the Palm Beach Post noted in 1990 that "Heart and Soul" is the song for which the Cleftones are best remembered. In 1999, American music critic Dave Marsh listed The Cleftones' "Heart and Soul" as number 913 in his book, The Heart of Rock & Soul: The 1001 Greatest Singles Ever Made.

In 2012, American author and essayist Ray Schuck noted that the lyrics, "Well, I know that you're in love with him, 'cause I saw you dancing in the gym/You both kicked off your shoes – man, I dig those rhythm and blues." —from Don McLean's song "American Pie" might be a vague reference to the Cleftones' 1961 rhythm and blues song, "Heart and Soul." In his essay, Schuck argued that such a reference would "segue nicely into the verses comprising the remainder of this stanza, albeit with a disappointing outcome."

== Jan and Dean version ==
Jan and Dean covered the song at the same time as the Cleftones's record was on the chart. They intended for it to be released on Liberty Records, which balked, and it was released on Gene Autry's Challenge Records instead. It reached No. 25 on the charts. On Canada's CHUM Charts the song reached No. 13. Liberty, noting the success, signed them, and Jan and Dean went on to make five top-ten singles for the label ("Surf City", "Honolulu Lulu", "Drag City", "Dead Man’s Curve", and "The Little Old Lady (from Pasadena)").

== Uses in other media ==
The song was featured as part of a "Hearts" medley in The Brady Bunch Variety Hour.

In 1980, an improvised piano version was performed in The Competition.

Two characters perform the song in a piano museum in the 1980 Disney film Midnight Madness.

In the 1988 fantasy comedy film Big, the tune was played on a giant piano at FAO Schwarz, where characters portrayed by Robert Loggia and Tom Hanks perform a duet in front of other customers.

In the TV sitcom Frasier, during the 1998 fifth season episode 20 titled "First Date", the tune and song is sung by Niles and Daphne during a memorable and important scene as they slice vegetables. In Frasier during the 2001 Season 8, Episode 18 titled "Daphne Returns", the scene and song from Season 5 Episode 20 is referenced as a flashback.

In Superman Returns (2006), Jason White was tinkering with this song on the piano throughout the movie. In one scene, one of Lex Luthor's henchmen joins Jason for a piano duet on the ship.

In 2011, the song was featured in Family Guy S09E16 ("The Big Bang Theory") at 5:50, when Stewie shows Brian that they can do everything outside space and time. It was used again in 2018 for S16E13 ("V is for Mystery"), where Sherlock (Stewie) and Watson (Brian) play it on the bagpipes inside Veronica's (Meg's) corpse.

Apple used the song in a commercial for the first iPad Mini, demonstrating how it could be used similar to a larger-sized iPad despite its smaller screen size.

"Play That Song", a single by the band Train that incorporates portions of the melody, reached number 41 on the Billboard Hot 100 chart in February 2017.

The character Chloe Decker, portrayed by Lauren German, plays "Heart and Soul" on the piano in the television series Lucifer in the ninth episode of the first season and the tenth episode of the sixth and final season.

In the video game Deltarune, the player gains access to a large playable piano in the fourth chapter, with certain songs triggering special dialogue from party members Ralsei and Susie. "Heart & Soul" is one of them, with Susie telling Kris to stop messing around in response to being played, sharing this interaction with "Chopsticks" and "You've Got a Friend in Me".

== See also ==
- "Blue Moon"
- "Der Flohwalzer"
- "I Love the Mountains (Boom De Yada)"
- "Play That Song" (Train song), a 2016 adaptation
- List of 1930s jazz standards
- List of songs containing the 50s progression
