= Window (album) =

Studio album by Christopher Cross
- Released: August 25, 1994
- Studio: O'Henry Sound Studios (Burbank, California); The Zoo (Encino, California)
- Genre: Soft rock
- Length: 49:33
- Label: Ariola; Polystar; Rhythm Safari
- Producer: Christopher Cross; Rob Meurer; Dennis Lambert

Christopher Cross chronology
Rendezvous (1992)	Window (1994)	Walking in Avalon (1998)

Professional ratings
Review scores
Source	Rating
AllMusic	2/5 stars

Window is the sixth studio album by American singer Christopher Cross. It was released in the United States in 1994 through Rhythm Safari. The album did not achieve the sales success of his earlier albums, failing to chart or generate the comeback that Cross desired.

Window was also released separately in Germany by Ariola and Japan by Geronimo Records (a sublabel of Polystar Records), where it reached No.91 on the Oricon Albums Chart.

== Reception ==
Stephen Thomas Erlewine in AllMusic stated "most of the record is devoid of anything resembling hooks; instead, it relies on its production to make an impact. As a result, Window is a bland collection of faceless, mellow pop that works only as background music."

== Track listing ==
All songs written by Christopher Cross and Rob Meurer, except where noted.

No.	Title	Writer(s)	Length
1.	"Been There, Done That"	Cross; Dennis Lambert	4:36
2.	"Wild Wild West"		3:36
3.	"Wishing Well"		5:56
4.	"Thinkin' 'Bout You"		5:17
5.	"Jan's Tune"		3:16
6.	"Open Up My Window"		4:10
7.	"Nature's Way"	Randy California	3:15
8.	"Uncharted Hearts"		4:41
9.	"Before I Go"		4:38
10.	"Love Is Calling"		6:46
11.	"Save Your Sadness [Only Canada CD]"		3:22
Total length:			49:33

== Personnel ==
- Christopher Cross – vocals, guitars
- Claude Gaudette – keyboards (1, 6), synth pad (10)
- Rob Meurer – keyboards, dulcimer, percussion, string arrangements (4)
- Mike Hannigan – Hammond B3 organ (3)
- Suzie Katayama – accordion (4), string arrangements (4)
- Michael Thompson – guitars (1, 6)
- JayDee Maness – steel guitar (2)
- Matt Bissonette – bass (1)
- Chas Thompson – bass (2–11)
- Gregg Bissonette – drums (1)
- Jody Cortez – drums (2–11)
- Kim Wilson – harmonica (3)
- Judd Miller – electronic valve instrument pad and solo (8)
- Ray Pizzi – bassoon solo (10)
- Stefanie Fife – cello (4, 5), string arrangements (4)
- Larry Tuttle – double bass (5)
- Novi Novog – viola (4, 5), string arrangements (4), viola solo (5)
- Joel Derouin – violin (4, 5), string arrangements (4)
- Donald Palmer – violin (4, 5), string arrangements (4)
- Beth Anderson – backing vocals (1)
- Jean McClain – backing vocals (1)
- Gigi Worth – backing vocals (1, 3), vocals
- Valerie Carter – backing vocals (3)

=== Production ===
- Dennis Lambert – producer (1, 6)
- Christopher Cross – producer (2–5, 7–11)
- Rob Meurer – producer (2–5, 7–11)
- Doug Rider – recording (1), mixing (1), additional recording (2–11)
- Gabe Veltri – recording (2–11), mixing (2–11)
- Richard Landers – assistant engineer
- Jeff Shannon – assistant engineer
- Brett Swain – assistant engineer
- Bernie Grundman – mastering at Bernie Grundman Mastering (Hollywood, California)
- Stephanie Baker – cover photography
- Jan Cross – art direction, inner booklet photography
- Elizabeth Burnell – graphics
- Baruch/Consolo Management – representation
