= I Love the Mountains =

American folk song

"I Love the Mountains", also known as "Boom De Yada", is a popular English-language children's song, American folk song, Hawaiian folk song and campfire song that dates back to at least the 1950s. It is a common staple of Scouts culture and summer camps, being frequently covered by children's musicians.

Its origins are uncertain, but it has been noted to share a similar doo-wop chord progression with "Heart And Soul" by Hoagy Carmichael and Frank Loesser, recorded in 1938.

== Lyrics ==
=== Verse ===
Almost all published versions of the lyrics contain the following verse. Some versions simply repeat the verse or expound upon it, often describing things in nature they also love:

I love the mountains
I love the rolling hills
I love the flowers
I love the daffodils
I love the fireside
When the lights are low

=== Chorus ===
The chorus consisting of repeating "Boom De Yada" a total of eight times. Variations may also consist of "Boom dee ah dah, "Boom Di Adda" or other similar sounding phrases:

Boom de yada. Boom de yada.
Boom de yada. Boom de yada.
Boom de yada. Boom de yada.
Boom de yada. Boom de yada.

== Versions ==
The Discovery Channel adapted the song's lyrics for its 2008 campaign "The World Is Just Awesome" featuring network personality Mike Rowe. Following the commercials, a variety of modified versions were created and posted on YouTube. In 2020, Rowe and the network issued an updated version of the adapted song.
