= Adam Again (album) =

Studio album by Michael Omartian
- Released: 1976
- Studio: Sound Labs Studios (Hollywood, California)
- Genre: CCM
- Label: Myrrh
- Producer: Michael Omartian

Michael Omartian chronology
| White Horse (1974) | Adam Again (1976) | Seasons of the Soul (with Stormie Omartian) (1978) |

Adam Again is the second solo album by Michael Omartian, released originally in 1976, on Myrrh Records as both the original single album and as a compilation of White Horse and Adam Again. It was released overseas under the title Onward, along with a different cover.

== Track listing ==
All songs written by Michael and Stormie Omartian except "Prelude" by Michael Omartian.

Side one

1. "Ain’t You Glad" 2:52
2. "No Matter What Shape You’re In" 3:16
3. "See This House” 3:53
4. "Wacher Sign" 3:30
5. “Annie the Poet” 3:58

Side two (Telos Suite)

6. "Prelude" 1:31
7. "Alive and Well” 4:44
8. "Adam Again" 4:59
9. "Here He Comes" 6:00

== Personnel ==
- Michael Omartian – vocals, keyboards, percussion, synthesizers (3, 6), drums (3)
- Dean Parks – guitars (1, 2, 9)
- Lee Ritenour – guitars (2, 4, 7, 9)
- Richard Bennett – guitars (7, 8)
- Larry Carlton – guitars (8), guitar solo (9)
- Wilton Felder – bass (1, 9)
- Scott Edwards – bass (2, 4)
- Leland Sklar – bass (5)
- David Hungate – bass (7, 8)
- David Kemper – drums (1, 5, 7, 8, 9)
- Ed Greene – drums (2, 4)
- Victor Feldman – percussion (7, 8)
- Ernie Watts – horns, alto sax solo (3)
- Don Menza – horns
- Paul Hubinon – horns, trumpet solo (7)
- Vincent DeRosa – horns
- David Duke – horns
- Sid Sharp – concertmaster
- The LA Super Strings – strings
- Stormie Omartian – backing vocals
- Ann White – backing vocals
- Carolyn Willis – backing vocals

== Production ==
- Michael Omartian – producer, arrangements
- Tommy Vicari – engineer
- The Mastering Lab (Hollywood, California) – mastering location
- Harry Langdon – photography
