= Bea Wain =

American jazz singer and radio personality (1917–2017)

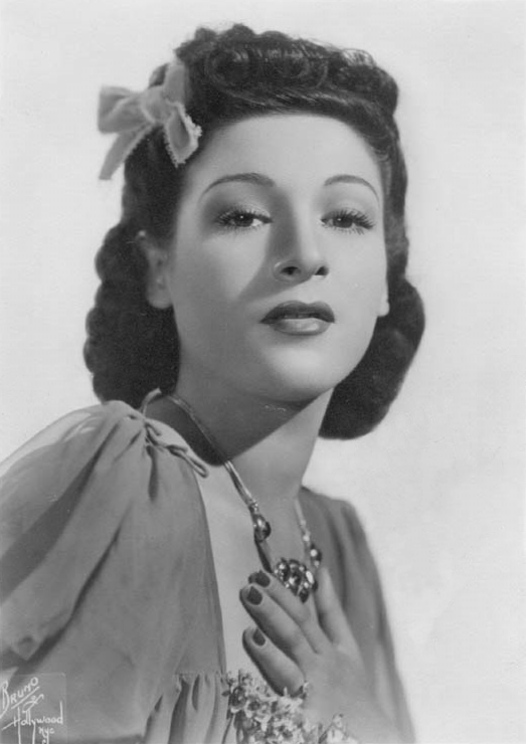
- Bea Wain in 1943
- Born: Beatrice Ruth Wain; April 30, 1917; New York City, U.S.
- Died: August 19, 2017 (aged 100); Beverly Hills, California, U.S.
- Other name: Beatrice Wayne
- Occupations: Singer, radio personality
- Spouse: André Baruch (m. 1938; died 1991)
- Children: 2

Beatrice Ruth Wain (April 30, 1917 – August 19, 2017) was an American Big Band-era singer and radio personality born in the Bronx, New York City. She had several hits with Larry Clinton and His Orchestra, including "My Reverie", "Deep Purple", and "Heart and Soul". Wain and announcer Andre Baruch, her husband, co-hosted radio programs from the 1940s to the 1980s.

== Career ==
Wain made her debut on radio at age 6 as a "featured performer" on the NBC Children's Hour. As an adult, she sang regularly on The Larry Clinton Show (NBC 1938), Monday Merry-Go-Round (NBC Blue 1941–1942), Starlight Serenade (Mutual 1944), and Your Hit Parade.

She led the vocal group Bea and the Bachelors (with Al Rinker, Ken Lane, and John Smedberg).

Her debut with Clinton was made in the summer of 1938 at the Glen Island Casino, New Rochelle, New York.

=== Recordings ===
On a 1937 recording with Artie Shaw, she was credited as Beatrice Wayne, which led some to assume that was her real name. On record labels, her name was shortened (without her permission) to "Bea" by the record company, ostensibly for space considerations. As she explained, "They cut it to 'Bea' Wain. They cut the 'Beatrice' out to 'Bea'. I was just a little old girl singer, but that's the truth. So that's how my name became 'Bea Wain'."

Wain's recording of My Reverie (Victor 26006) with the Clinton orchestra stayed at the top of the chart for eight weeks in 1938. Her other popular recordings included "Deep Purple", "Heart and Soul", and "Martha".

In 1939, Wain was voted by Billboard Magazine as 'Female Band Vocalist of The Year', beating superstars such as Ella Fitzgerald to the title.

Wain was the first artist to record the Harold Arlen-Yip Harburg classic "Over the Rainbow" (for RCA Victor on December 7, 1938, with Clinton's orchestra), but Metro-Goldwyn-Mayer forbade the release of the record until The Wizard of Oz (1939) had opened and audiences heard Judy Garland perform it.

Wain rarely made recordings after she left the Clinton orchestra in 1939, focusing primarily on her work on radio, but she did enjoy some chart success with:

- "I'm Nobody's Baby" (1940, No.11)
- "Do I Worry?" (1941, No. 23)
- "My Sister and I" (1941, No. 15)
- "Kiss the Boys Goodbye" (1941, No. 8)

=== "Mr. and Mrs. Music" ===
Following World War II, Wain worked with her husband, Andre Baruch, as a disc jockey team in New York on WMCA, where they were billed as "Mr. and Mrs. Music". An article in the May 1949 issue of Radio Best magazine noted, "In the trade she is looked upon as an accurate picker of hits and is a favourite song plugger of tunesmiths like Cole Porter, Johnny Mercer, Harold Arlen and Harry Warren."

During the early 1980s, the pair hosted a syndicated radio recreation of Your Hit Parade. Baruch died in 1991.

In a 2004 interview with Christopher Popa, Wain reflected: "Actually, I've had a wonderful life, a wonderful career. And I'm still singing, and I'm still singing pretty good. This past December, I did a series of shows in Palm Springs, California, and the review said, 'Bea Wain is still a giant.' It's something called Musical Chairs. I did six shows in six different venues, and I was a smash. And I really got a kick out of it."

== Death ==
Wain died of congestive heart failure at an assisted living home in Beverly Hills, California, on August 19, 2017, at the age of 100.

== Sources ==
- ArtistDirect.com: Bea Wain; accessed 17 October 17, 2005.
- Bea Wain & Bea and the Bachelors, parabrisas.com; accessed August 29, 2015.
- Bea Wain, 'girl singer' from big-band era who jammed with Pavarotti, dies at 100; accessed August 21, 2017.
