= Larry Clinton =

American musician (1909–1985)

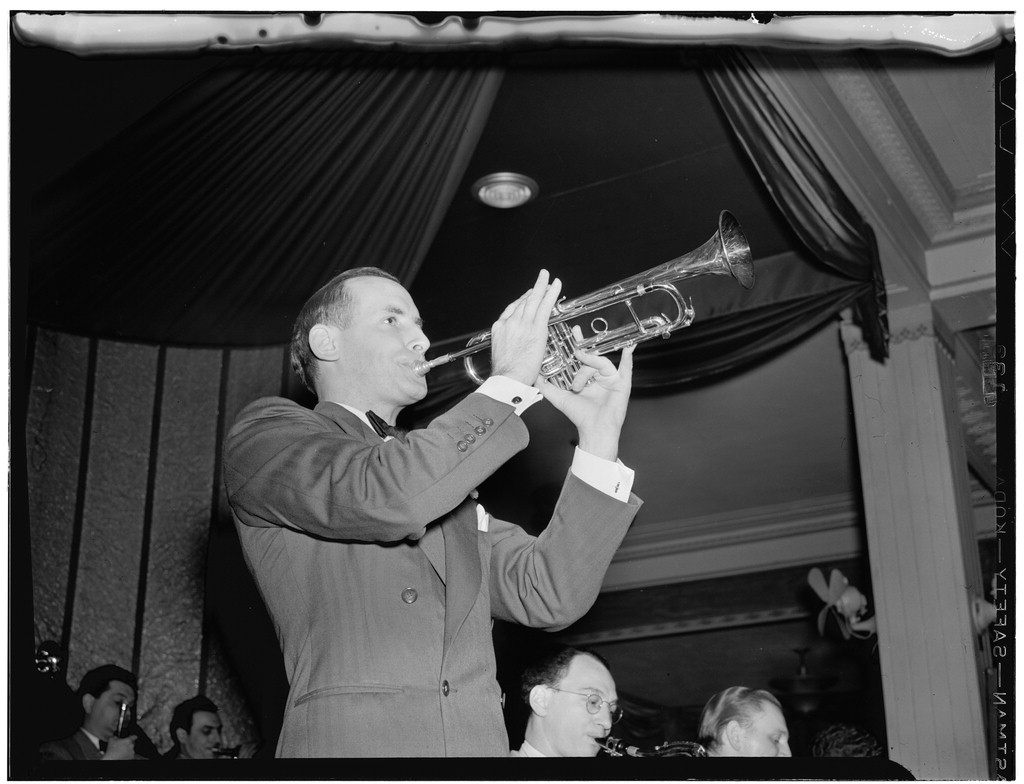

Background information
- Born: August 17, 1909; Brooklyn, New York, U.S.
- Died: May 2, 1985 (aged 75) Tucson, Arizona, U.S.
- Genres: Jazz, big band
- Occupations: Bandleader, composer, jazz musician
- Instruments: Trombone, trumpet
- Years active: 1930-1961
- Label: RCA Victor

Larry Clinton (August 17, 1909 – May 2, 1985) was an American musician, best known as a trumpeter who became a prominent American bandleader and arranger.

His jazz and pop standards were "The Dipsy Doodle" (1937), "My Reverie" (1938), and "Heart and Soul" (1938). He also composed "Satan Takes a Holiday", "Midnight in the Madhouse", and "Calypso Melody".

== Biography ==
Clinton was born in Brooklyn, New York, United States. He became a versatile musician, playing trumpet, trombone, and clarinet. While in his twenties, he became a prolific arranger for dance orchestras; bandleaders Tommy Dorsey, Jimmy Dorsey, Glen Gray, Louis Armstrong, and Bunny Berigan all used Larry Clinton charts.

His first stint as a bandleader was from 1937 to 1941, and he recorded a string of hits for RCA Victor. The Clinton band's repertoire was split between pop tunes of the day ("I Double Dare You", "Summer Souvenirs", "Deep Purple"); ambitious instrumentals penned by Clinton like "Satan Takes a Holiday" (recorded by Tommy Dorsey), "The Big Dipper", "Midnight in the Madhouse", and the most popular, "A Study in Brown", which begat four sequels in different "colors"; and swing adaptations of classical compositions. This last category swept the industry, and orchestras everywhere were "swinging the classics" by adding pop lyrics to melodies by Debussy and Tchaikovsky. His arrangement and adaptation of Debussy's "Reverie", with vocalist Bea Wain, was particularly popular. Entitled "My Reverie", his version peaked at No. 1 on Billboard's Record Buying Guide in 1938. "Abba Dabba" was based on Tchaikovsky's "Arabian Dance" from The Nutcracker; "Martha", with new pop-ballad lyrics sung by Wain, was adapted from the Friedrich von Flotow opera.

Clinton was the first to record and release the standard "Heart and Soul" featuring Bea Wain on vocals in 1939. The single reached no. 1.

His classic composition "The Dipsy Doodle" became his theme song and was widely covered by other bands and singers. Tommy Dorsey and His Orchestra were the first to record it (in 1937, with Edythe Wright as vocalist).

== Appearances in film ==
Clinton's band was predominantly a recording group that also played college proms and hotel ballrooms. On the strength of Clinton's record hit "The Dipsy Doodle", Vitaphone and Paramount Pictures signed the band to star in three 10-minute theatrical films. All were filmed in New York.

In 1941, Clinton and his band appeared in six short musical films, designed for then-popular "movie jukeboxes". (The films were ultimately released as Soundies in 1943.) This was one of his last jobs as a bandleader; he quit the music business upon the outbreak of World War II, and joined the United States Army Air Forces. A rated pilot, he rose to the rank of captain, was stationed with the Air Transport Command in Calcutta and China during Hump airlift, and was a flight instructor with the 1343rd Base Unit.

He resumed his musical career and enjoyed further success as a bandleader from 1948 to 1950. Clinton's composition "Calypso Melody" was a chart hit for bandleader and composer David Rose in 1957 on MGM Records, becoming a million seller and earning a gold disc. The single reached #25 on Music Vendor, #33 on Cash Box, and #42 on Billboard. Clinton remained active in the music business, often leading a studio band for pop singers until 1961.

== Radio ==
In 1938, Clinton had his own program, The Larry Clinton Show on NBC.

== Death ==
Clinton died in 1985 in Tucson, Arizona, at the age of 75, and survived by his wife Irene Wanda (commonly known as Wanda, 1915-1994, née Salik, married Larry in 1931) and their son Larry Jr.
