= White Horse (album) =

Studio album by Michael Omartian
- Released: 1974
- Studio: Sound Labs and Hollywood Sound Recorders (Hollywood, California)
- Length: 33:42
- Label: Dunhill
- Producer: Michael Omartian

Michael Omartian chronology
White Horse (1974)	Adam Again (1976)

White Horse is the first solo album by Michael Omartian, released originally in 1974, on Dunhill Records and re-released on Myrrh Records as both a single album and as a compilation of White Horse and Adam Again. Like most of Omartian's solo work, it is in the Christian rock genre.

== Reception ==
Professional ratings
Review scores
Source	Rating
Allmusic	4.5/5 stars

Marty Phillips of Jesus Rock Legends called White Horse "well produced synth oriented Jazz-pop and fusion". He praised the arrangements, keyboard work, lead guitar parts, and restrained use of horn instruments.

In his Allmusic review, Mark Allender wrote, "... this record cooks from beginning to end. Christian Contemporary Music has never been so hip. CCM in general has a reputation for being watered down and unemotional, but this record squeaked through without any dilution at all... this record is his masterpiece."

== Track listing ==
All songs written by Michael & Stormie Omartian.

=== Side one ===
1. "Jeremiah" – 4:37
2. "Fat City" – 3:09
3. "Orphan" – 2:01
4. "Silver Fish" – 2:34
5. "Add Up The Wonders" – 5:19

=== Side two ===
6. "Take Me Down" – 3:39
7. "Right From The Start" – 2:30
8. "Rest Is Up To You" – 2:47
9. "White Horse" – 7:06

== Personnel ==
- Michael Omartian – vocals, keyboards, percussion, tom tom (6), steel drums (8)
- Larry Carlton – guitars, lead guitar (8), bass (8, 9)
- Dean Parks – guitars, guitar solo (1), flute (4), alto sax solo (9)
- David Hungate – bass (1, 4, 5)
- Wilton Felder – bass (2, 6)
- David Kemper – drums (1, 4, 5, 9)
- Ed Greene – drums (2, 6, 8)
- Alan Estes – drumbeg (1)
- King Errisson – congas (6)
- Jackie Kelso – tenor saxophone
- Don Menza – tenor saxophone
- Paul Hubinon – trumpet, French horn, trumpet solo (1)
- The Sid Sharp Strings – strings (3, 7)
- Jesse Ehrlich – cello (9)
- Patricia Henderson – backing vocals
- Stormie Omartian – backing vocals
- Carolyn Willis – backing vocals
- Ann White – backing vocals

== Production ==
- Michael Omartian – producer, arrangements
- Michael Lietz – recording (1, 5, 7), mixing (7)
- Tommy Vicari – mixing (1–6, 8, 9), recording (2, 3, 6, 8)
- John Guess – recording (4, 9)
- The Mastering Lab (Hollywood, California) – mastering location
- David Jarvis – album cover artwork
- James Fitzgerald – album cover concept, management
- Harry Langdon – photography
