= Back of My Mind (Christopher Cross album) =

Studio album by Christopher Cross
- Released: August 23, 1988
- Recorded: December 1987–August 1988
- Studios: Pop 'n' Roll Studios (Santa Monica); The Lighthouse (North Hollywood); Homelands (Beverly Hills); Lion Share Studios (Hollywood); Angel Studios (London)
- Genre: Soft rock
- Length: 42:10
- Label: Reprise
- Producer: Michael Omartian

Christopher Cross chronology
| Every Turn of the World (1985) | Back of My Mind (1988) | The Best of Christopher Cross (1991) |

Singles from Back of My Mind
- 1. "I Will (Take You Forever)" / "Just One Look" Released: October 1988; 2. "Swept Away" / "Alibi" Released: December 1988; 3. "Someday" Released: March 1989

Professional ratings
Review scores
| Source | Rating |
|---|---|
| AllMusic | 2/5 stars |

Back of My Mind is the fourth studio album by singer Christopher Cross, released in 1988 through Reprise Records instead of Warner Bros. Records. Both the album and its singles failed to chart in the United States (although "I Will (Take You Forever)" did chart in several other countries). "Swept Away" was previously heard on a few episodes of the TV show Growing Pains in 1987. The album would be the fourth and final studio album to be produced by Michael Omartian before Cross and his childhood friend Rob Meurer produced his fifth album Rendezvous in 1991.

== Track listing ==
All tracks are written by Christopher Cross, with additional writers noted.

Side one
| No. | Title | Writer(s) | Length |
|---|---|---|---|
| 1. | "Someday" | Rob Meurer | 3:12 |
| 2. | "Never Stop Believing" | Erich Bulling; John Bettis | 4:00 |
| 3. | "Swept Away" | Bettis; Steve Dorff | 4:23 |
| 4. | "Any Old Time" | Bettis | 4:05 |
| 5. | "I Will (Take You Forever)" (duet with Frances Ruffelle) | Meurer; Michael Omartian | 4:15 |

Side two
| No. | Title | Writer(s) | Length |
|---|---|---|---|
| 6. | "She Told Me So" | Bettis; Omartian | 4:08 |
| 7. | "Back of My Mind" | Meurer | 3:55 |
| 8. | "I'll Be Alright" | Meurer; Omartian | 4:54 |
| 9. | "Alibi" | Meurer | 4:41 |
| 10. | "Just One Look" | | 4:37 |
| Total length: | | | 42:10 |

== Personnel ==
=== Musicians ===
- Christopher Cross – lead vocals, backing vocals, guitars, arrangements
- Michael Omartian – keyboards, drum programming, string arrangements, arrangements
- Rob Meurer – additional keyboards (1, 9), arrangements
- JayDee Maness – steel guitar (4)
- Joe Chemay – bass guitar
- Alex Acuña – percussion (2, 8)
- Judd Miller – EVI solo (7), synthesizer pads (7)
- Dan Higgins – baritone saxophone (8)
- Larry Williams – tenor saxophone (8)
- Tom Scott – lyricon (9), saxophone (10)
- Michael McDonald – backing vocals (1)
- Christine McVie – backing vocals (2)
- Frances Ruffelle – co-lead vocals (5)
- Andraé Crouch – backing vocals (8)
- Kevin Dorsey – backing vocals (8)
- Lue McCrary – backing vocals (8)
- Rick Nelson – backing vocals (8)
- Quartario Tucker – backing vocals (8)
- Fred White – backing vocals (8)
- Karen Blake – backing vocals (10)

=== Technical ===
- Produced by Michael Omartian
- Engineered and mixed by Terry Christian
- Additional engineers – Tom Fouce and Mark Linett
- Assistant engineers – Jeffrey Woodruff, Doug Carleton, Laura Livingston, and Tom Leader
- Production coordinator – Janet Southwell
- Photography – Peter Lavery
- Management – Front Line Management

== Charts ==
| Chart (1988) | Peak position |
|---|---|
| Dutch Albums (Album Top 100) | 93 |
| German Albums (Offizielle Top 100) | 45 |
| Swedish Albums (Sverigetopplistan) | 49 |

== Certifications ==
| Region | Certification | Certified units/sales |
|---|---|---|
| Spain (Promusicae) | Gold | 50,000^{^} |
^{^} Shipments figures based on certification alone.
