= Christopher Cross (album) =

Studio album by Christopher Cross
- Released: December 27, 1979
- Recorded: July 1979
- Studio: Warner Bros. Recording Studios (North Hollywood): Pecan Street Studios (Austin)
- Genres: Soft rock; yacht rock
- Length: 38:32
- Label: Warner Bros.
- Producer: Michael Omartian

Christopher Cross chronology
Christopher Cross (1979)	Another Page (1983)

Singles from Christopher Cross
- 1. "Ride Like the Wind" Released: January 30, 1980; 2. "Sailing" Released: May 5, 1980; 3. "Never Be the Same" Released: September 24, 1980; 4. "Say You'll Be Mine" Released: March 1981

Professional ratings
Review scores
Source	Rating
AllMusic	4.5/5 stars

Christopher Cross is the debut studio album by American singer-songwriter Christopher Cross, released on December 27, 1979, by Warner Bros. Records. Produced by Michael Omartian and recorded in July 1979, the album was one of the first in popular music to be digitally recorded, utilizing the 3M Digital Recording System. Cross dedicated the song "Ride Like the Wind" to Lowell George of Little Feat, who died during the making of the album.

Cited as one of the most influential soft rock albums of the late 1970s and early 1980s, it won five Grammy Awards at the 1981 Grammy Awards, including Album of the Year, Record of the Year, Song of the Year, and Best New Artist, with Cross becoming the first artist to win the four major categories in the same year.

== Reception ==
According to Stephen Thomas Erlewine, the album was "a huge hit and widely acclaimed, at least among industry professionals (critics didn't give it a second listen), leading to multi-platinum success and Grammys." In his retrospective review for AllMusic, Erlewine says that while its success as a soft rock album has little cachet with most listeners, it "remains one of the best mainstream albums of its time" because of consistent song quality and Cross's skillful musicianship: "Yes, he does favor sentimentality and can be very sweet on the ballads, but his melodicism is rich and construction tight, so there's a sturdy foundation for the classy professional gloss provided by his studio pros and friends, including indelible backing vocals by Michael McDonald."

In retrospective appraisals, Christopher Cross is regarded as a key release of yacht rock music. For Spin in 2009, Chuck Eddy lists it among the genre's eight essential albums. Vinyl Me, Please magazine's Timothy Malcolm includes it in his 2017 list of the 10 best yacht rock albums, explaining that, "It’s actually a sonic outlier for the yacht rock genre, heavy on acoustic guitar and strings. But its message fits the genre (a fool searching for inner peace), and yeah, it’s still undeniably smooth." For The Vinyl District's online publication in 2018, Michael H. Little calls it the genre's best album as well as one of its smoothest, crediting it for making Cross "the face of soft rock".

== Track listing ==
All tracks are written by Christopher Cross.

Side one
No.	Title	Length
1.	"Say You'll Be Mine"	2:53
2.	"I Really Don't Know Anymore"	3:49
3.	"Spinning"	3:59
4.	"Never Be the Same"	4:40
5.	"Poor Shirley"	4:20

Side two
No.	Title	Length
6.	"Ride Like the Wind"	4:32
7.	"The Light Is On"	4:07
8.	"Sailing"	4:14
9.	"Minstrel Gigolo"	6:00
Total length:		38:32

2012 Bonus Track
No.	Title	Length
10.	"Mary Ann"	2:55
Total length:		41:27

'Mary Ann' was originally written for the YAMAHA World Music Festival in Japan and released in 1980 as a Japan only single.

== Personnel ==
=== Musicians ===
- Christopher Cross – lead vocals, backing vocals (1, 5–8), acoustic guitar (1, 4, 6–9), electric guitar (1, 4, 7, 8), guitar solo (5, 6)
- Michael Omartian – acoustic piano (1–4, 6–8), electric piano (6), synthesizers (9), backing vocals (9)
- Rob Meurer – synthesizers (2–4, 6–8), electric piano (3, 4, 7, 8), celeste (3), acoustic piano (5, 9), organ (5)
- Jay Graydon – guitar solo (1, 4)
- Larry Carlton – guitar solo (2, 7)
- Eric Johnson – guitar solo (9)
- Andy Salmon – bass
- Tommy Taylor – drums
- Lenny Castro – percussion (1, 2, 4–7, 9)
- Victor Feldman – percussion (3, 7, 8), vibraphone (3, 4)
- Jim Horn – saxophone (2, 6)
- Jackie Kelso – saxophone (2, 6)
- Don Roberts – saxophone (2, 6)
- Tomás Ramírez – saxophone solo (9)
- Lew McCreary – trombone (2, 6)
- Chuck Findley – trumpet (2, 6), flugelhorn (3)
- Assa Drori – concertmaster (3, 5, 6, 8)
- Nicolette Larson – backing vocals (1)
- Michael McDonald – backing vocals (2, 6)
- Valerie Carter – harmony vocals (3)
- Stormie Omartian – backing vocals (4)
- Myrna Matthews – backing vocals (4)
- Marty McCall – backing vocals (4)
- Don Henley – backing vocals (7)
- JD Souther – backing vocals (7)

=== Technical ===
- Produced by Michael Omartian
- Assistant producer – Michael Ostin
- Engineered and mixed by Chet Himes
- Second engineer – Stuart Gitlin
- Mastered by Bobby Hata at Warner Bros. Studios (North Hollywood, CA)
- Design – James Flournoy Holmes (Wonder Graphics)
- Artwork – James Flournoy Holmes and Danny Henderson
- Flamingo concept – Jim Newhouse
- Management – Tim Neece (Artist Communications)

== Charts ==
=== Weekly charts ===
Chart (1980–1981)	Peak position
Canada Top Albums/CDs (RPM)	26
Dutch Albums (Album Top 100)	14
New Zealand Albums (RMNZ)	16
UK Albums (Official Charts)	14
US Billboard 200	6

=== Year-end charts ===
Chart (1980)	Position
US Billboard 200	17
Chart (1981)	Position
US Billboard 200	4

== Certifications ==
Region	Certification	Certified units/sales
Australia (ARIA)	2× Platinum	140,000^{^}
France (SNEP)	Platinum	300,000^{*}
Germany (BVMI)	Gold	250,000^{^}
Netherlands (NVPI)	Gold	50,000^{^}
New Zealand (RMNZ)	Gold	7,500^{^}
Spain (Promusicae)	Gold	50,000^{^}
United Kingdom (BPI)	Platinum	300,000^{^}
United States (RIAA)	5× Platinum	5,000,000^{^}
^{*} Sales figures based on certification alone.^{^} Shipments figures based on certification alone.

== Accolades ==
Cross, the album and the hit "Sailing" won the following Grammy Awards:

Year	Category	Winner
1981	Album of the Year	Christopher Cross
1981	Best Instrumental Arrangement Accompanying Vocalist(s)	"Sailing"
1981	Record of the Year	"Sailing"
1981	Song of the Year	"Sailing"
1981	Best New Artist	Christopher Cross

Producer Michael Omartian accepted the Album of the Year award on behalf of Warner Bros. Records and the album's personnel.
