= Christopher Cross =

American singer-songwriter (born 1951)

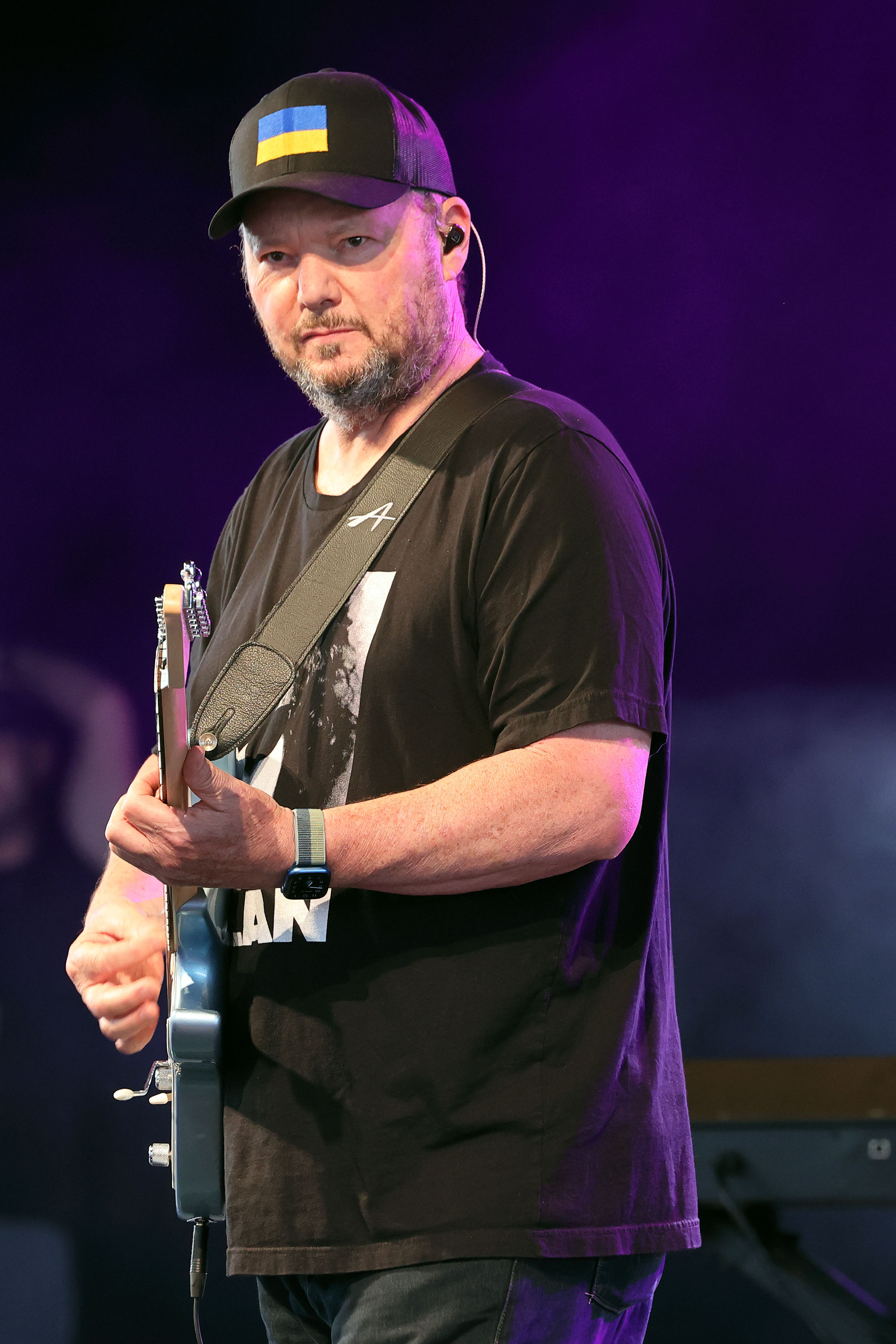
- Cross in 2022

Background information
- Born: Christopher Charles Geppert; May 3, 1951 (age 75); San Antonio, Texas, U.S.
- Genres: Soft rock; pop rock; yacht rock
- Occupations: Musician; singer; songwriter; record producer; guitarist
- Instruments: Vocals; guitar
- Years active: 1971–present
- Labels: Warner Bros.; Reprise; Ariola; BMG; CMC International
- Spouse(s): Roseanne Harrison (m. 1973; div. 1982) Jan Bunch (m. 1988; div. 2007)
- Website: christophercross.com

Christopher Charles Geppert (born May 3, 1951), known professionally as Christopher Cross, is an American singer, songwriter, and guitarist. He won five Grammy Awards for his eponymous debut album released in 1979. The singles "Sailing" (1980), and "Arthur's Theme (Best That You Can Do)", from the 1981 film Arthur, peaked at number one on the U.S. Billboard Hot 100.

"Sailing" earned three Grammys in 1980. "Arthur's Theme" won in 1982 the Oscar for Best Original Song, with co-writers Burt Bacharach, Carole Bayer Sager, and Peter Allen.

== Early life ==
Christopher Charles Geppert was born on May 3, 1951 in San Antonio, Texas. A self-described "army brat", Cross is the son of a U.S. Army pediatrician who was stationed at Walter Reed Army Hospital in Washington, D.C., in the mid-1950s and acted as a physician for President Dwight Eisenhower's grandchildren. He attended Alamo Heights High School in San Antonio, graduating in 1969. He played football and participated in track and field. Cross was raised Catholic.

== Career ==
=== Early musical career ===
Geppert developed an early interest in music, citing the influence of Buddy Holly, Ritchie Valens, and Dave Brubeck during childhood. As a seventh grader, he received a drum kit and began performing in a band called the Psychos, which played local church events and junior high school dances. Initially serving as the group’s drummer, Geppert also took on vocal duties due to the absence of another singer.

During high school, he shifted his primary focus to guitar, which he found more conducive to songwriting. Around this time, he became influenced by Frank Zappa, whom he admired less for Zappa's eccentricity and more for his instrumental approach and innovative rhythmic ideas.

Geppert, bassist Andy Salmon, and keyboardist Rob Meurer met in San Antonio when they were still teens. Geppert and Salmon became bandmates in Flash, with Geppert on guitar. Together, they formed Christopher Cross as a band and moved to Austin, where they added drummer Tommy Taylor. There, they played covers for cash while recording demo versions of original songs at Austin's Odyssey Sound, which later became Pecan Street Studio, which they shipped to record labels. Though they considered themselves a band, Warner Bros. signed Christopher Cross as a solo artist in early 1979.

Although best known for his vocals and songwriting, Cross is also a skilled guitarist. Donald Fagen and Walter Becker of Steely Dan invited Cross to play on their albums, but Cross declined because "he was so intimidated, afraid to do it." Cross also substituted for Ritchie Blackmore during a Deep Purple concert in 1970 in San Antonio when Blackmore fell ill, and a local promoter recommended Cross as a last-minute replacement.

Cross was the original owner of fellow Austin guitarist Stevie Ray Vaughan's "Number One" 1962/1963 hybrid Fender Stratocaster. Vaughan purchased the guitar at Ray Hennig's Heart of Texas Music in Austin in 1974, only one day after Cross had traded the guitar for a Gibson Les Paul.

=== First album and immediate success ===
Cross released his self-titled debut album, Christopher Cross, on December 27, 1979. Billboard Hot 100 top 20 hits from this album included "Ride Like the Wind" (featuring backing vocals by Michael McDonald), "Sailing", "Never Be the Same" and "Say You'll Be Mine" (featuring backing vocals by Nicolette Larson). "Ride Like the Wind" hit number two on the U.S. Hot 100, while "Sailing" topped the chart for one week. "Never Be The Same" went number one on the Adult Contemporary chart. Cross, the album, and the song "Sailing" were nominated for six Grammy Awards in 1980 and won five.

Cross was the first artist in Grammy history to win all four general field awards in a single ceremony, bringing home Record of the Year ("Sailing"), Album of the Year (Christopher Cross), Song of the Year ("Sailing") and Best New Artist at the 23rd Annual Grammy Awards. (Note: Cross and producer Michael Omartian also won Best Arrangement Accompanying Vocalist(s), he was nominated for but did not win Best Pop Vocal Performance, Male. The album was also nominated for Best Engineered Recording – Non-Classical (Chet Himes).) This feat was not replicated for 39 years, until Billie Eilish won all four awards at the 62nd Annual Grammy Awards in 2020. In addition, "Sailing" won for Best Arrangement Accompanying Vocalist(s). Christopher Cross has been certified platinum five times in the U.S., selling over 5 million copies.

Later in 1981, Cross released "Arthur's Theme (Best That You Can Do)", co-written by Burt Bacharach, Carole Bayer Sager and Peter Allen, which was the main theme for the 1981 film Arthur. The song won the Oscar for Best Original Song in 1981, and was nominated for three Grammys, but did not win. (Note: The song was nominated for Record of the Year, Song of the Year and Best Pop Vocal Performance, Male) In the U.S., it reached number one on the Billboard Hot 100 and on the Hot Adult Contemporary charts in October 1981, remaining at the top of the Hot 100 for three weeks while it also was a top-ten hit in several other countries. The song became the second and last American number-one hit by Christopher Cross.

=== Second album ===
Cross's second album, Another Page (1983), produced "All Right", "No Time for Talk", and "Think of Laura". "All Right" was used by CBS Sports for its highlights montage following the 1983 NCAA Division I men's basketball tournament, while "Think of Laura" is used as a reference to characters on the soap opera General Hospital. Against his wishes, ABC used his song in this context. He has stated that he wrote "Think of Laura" not in reference to the television characters, but to celebrate the life of Denison University college student Laura Carter, who was killed when she was struck by a stray bullet.

Cross has stated on his social media platforms that he felt it was inappropriate for ABC/General Hospital to use the song against his wishes and those of Carter's family, but the short clips of the song were considered permissible fair use and helped record sales as well. Another Page sold well, getting Gold certification. He also co-wrote and sang the song "A Chance For Heaven" for the 1984 Summer Olympic Games.

=== 1980s ===
After 1984, Cross's commercial success faded. As music television channel MTV grew to dominate the mainstream music scene in the United States, Cross's style of music proved to be a bad fit for the network, and his brand of adult contemporary music declined in popularity.

Cross's next two albums, 1985's Every Turn of the World and 1988's Back of My Mind did not produce any top 40 hits or reach Gold or Platinum status. His track "Charm the Snake" was the sole success from his album Every Turn of the World. It reached No. 68 in the Billboard Hot 100.

He did, however, place the song "Swept Away" in the TV show Growing Pains. It was used during a video montage while Kirk Cameron's character Mike fell in love with a local girl while vacationing with the family in Hawaii.

=== 1990s ===
Cross made four more albums in the 1990s, Rendezvous (1992), Window (1994), Walking In Avalon (1998), and Red Room (1999). Although some of his releases gained positive critical response, he was not able to attract the mass audience he once enjoyed. After his decline in fame in the mid to late 1980s, he toured and opened for various acts during the 1990s.

=== 2000s ===
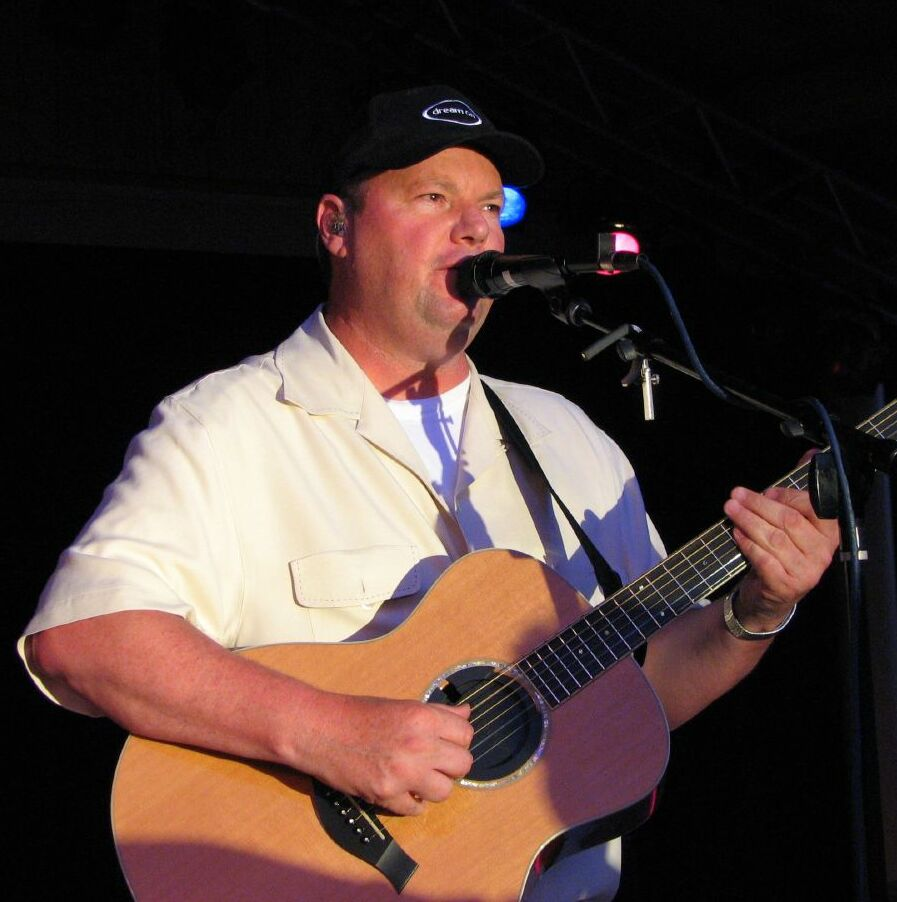
Cross in 2008

The year 2002 saw the release of the Very Best of... album, and in 2007 he completed a Christmas album titled A Christopher Cross Christmas. In 2008, Cross recorded a new acoustic album of his hits titled The Cafe Carlyle Sessions.

=== 2010s ===
In 2011, Cross released a new studio album titled Doctor Faith.

In 2013, he released A Night in Paris, a 2-CD live album he recorded and filmed in April 2012 at the Theatre Le Trianon in Paris, France.

The song "Ride Like the Wind" was featured on the Anchorman 2: The Legend Continues original movie soundtrack, released in 2013.

In September 2014, he released Secret Ladder, followed in November 2017 by Take Me as I Am.

In 2017, he played a concert in his hometown, at the Tobin Center, San Antonio, Texas.

In late 2019, Cross toured with Todd Rundgren, Jason Scheff, Micky Dolenz and Joey Molland of Badfinger in celebration of the Beatles' White Album on the "It Was Fifty Years Ago Today – A Tribute to the Beatles' White Album". Cross performed "Sailing" and "Ride Like the Wind".

=== 2020s ===
During 2021–2022, Cross played in his 40th anniversary tour which had been rescheduled due to the COVID-19 pandemic.

In 2025, Christopher Cross joined Toto as the special guest on the Dogz of Oz tour, performing across the U.K. and Europe in early 2025. Cross and Toto had previously shared the stage at the Hollywood Bowl on September 1, 2024, and this tour further solidified their booking together.

== Freedonia ==
In 2018, he joined with other musicians in Austin to form the band Freedonia.

With Freedonia, he has released two full-length albums: Freedonia (2018) and Firefly (2019) and an EP titled Bring Back The Dinosaurs (2021).

== Flamingo ==
A common feature of Cross's album covers is the appearance of a flamingo. According to Cross, there is no meaning behind this other than the painting chosen for his first album cover featured the bird, which has been used as a motif ever since.

== Personal life ==
Cross was married to Roseanne Harrison from 1973 to 1982. They had one son, Justin. He was married to Jan Bunch from 1988 to 2007. He had two children in that marriage, Madison and Rain.

On April 3, 2020, Cross confirmed through his Facebook page that he had tested positive for the COVID-19 virus, and was ill, but was recovering. Cross later reported on Twitter that he had lost the use of his legs, but his doctors told him he should fully recover. Physicians told him his illness triggered an episode of Guillain–Barré syndrome that caused the nerves in his legs to stop functioning properly. By October 2020, he was able to walk with a cane, but said his memory and speech had been affected. In 2021 and 2022 he played his 40th anniversary concert tour, which had originally been planned for 2020.

== Discography ==
=== Studio albums ===
Year	Album	Label	Chart positions									Certifications (sales thresholds)
Year	Album	Label	AUS	CAN	GER	JPN	NLD	NZ	SWE	UK	US	Certifications (sales thresholds)
1979	Christopher Cross	Warner Bros.	6	26	—	18	14	16	—	14	6	RIAA: 5× Platinum; ARIA: 2× Platinum; BPI: Platinum
1983	Another Page	Warner Bros.	6	23	2	1	7	9	12	4	11	RIAA: Gold; BPI: Gold
1985	Every Turn of the World	Warner Bros.	—	—	44	27	34	—	37	—	127	
1988	Back of My Mind	Reprise	—	—	45	27	93	—	49	—	—	
1992	Rendezvous	Ariola	—	—	—	96	—	—	—	—	—	
1994	Window	Ariola	—	—	—	91	—	—	—	—	—	
1998	Walking in Avalon	CMC	—	—	—	—	—	—	—	—	—	
1999	Red Room	CMC	—	—	—	—	—	—	—	—	—	
2007	A Christopher Cross Christmas	Sony	—	—	—	—	—	—	—	—	—	
2008	The Café Carlyle Sessions	Edel	—	—	—	—	—	—	—	—	—	
2011	Doctor Faith	Ear	—	—	48	—	—	—	—	—	—	
2014	Secret Ladder	Ear	—	—	—	—	—	—	—	—	—	
2017	Take Me As I Am	Christopher Cross Records	—	—	—	—	—	—	—	—	—	—
"—" denotes releases that did not chart.

=== Live albums ===
- 1998: A Night With Christopher Cross - Best Hits Live (Victor)
- 2012: A Night in Paris (Ear)

=== Compilations ===
- 1991: The Best of Christopher Cross (Warner Bros.)
- 1999: Greatest Hits Live (CMC)
- 2001: Definitive Christopher Cross (Warner Bros./Asia)
- 2002: The Very Best of Christopher Cross (Warner Bros.)
- 2011: Crosswords: The Best of Christopher Cross (Rhino)
- 2025: All Right: The Worldwide Singles 1980–1988 (Omnivore)

=== Soundtracks ===
- 1981: Arthur (Motion picture soundtrack) "Arthur's Theme (Best That You Can Do)"
- 1983: General Hospital (TV series soundtrack) "Think of Laura"
- 1984: Official Music of the XXIIIrd Olympiad "A Chance For Heaven" (swimming theme)
- 1986: Nothing in Common (Motion picture soundtrack) "Loving Strangers (David's Theme)"
- 2010: 30 Rock (TV series soundtrack) "Lemon's Theme"

=== Singles ===
Year	Single	Peak chart positions											Certifications (sales thresholds)	Album
Year	Single	CAN	GER	IRE	NED	NOR	AUS	NZ	SWI	UK	US	US A/C	Certifications (sales thresholds)	Album
1980	"Ride Like the Wind"	3	—	—	—	—	25	31	—	69	2	24	BPI: Silver	Christopher Cross
1980	"Sailing"	1	—	21	18	—	46	8	—	48	1	10	BPI: Silver	Christopher Cross
1980	"Never Be the Same"	—	—	25	—	—	42	41	—	—	15	1		Christopher Cross
1980	"Say You'll Be Mine"	33	—	—	—	—	—	—	—	—	20	15		Christopher Cross
1980	"Mary Ann" (Japan only)	—	—	—	—	—	—	—	—	—	—	—		Single only
1981	"Arthur's Theme (Best That You Can Do)"	2	—	7	—	1	13	10	6	7	1	1	RIAA: Gold; BPI: Silver	Arthur: The Album
1983	"All Right"	13	23	14	16	5	30	44	5	51	12	3		Another Page
1983	"No Time for Talk"	—	—	—	—	—	—	—	—	—	33	—		Another Page
1983	"Think of Laura"	9	—	—	—	—	100	—	—	—	9	1		Another Page
1983	"Deal 'Em Again"	—	—	—	—	—	—	—	—	—	—	—		Another Page
1984	"A Chance for Heaven" (swimming theme from 1984 Summer Olympics)	—	—	—	—	—	—	—	—	—	76	16		The Official Music of the XXIIIrd Olympiad Los Angeles 1984
1985	"Charm the Snake"	—	—	—	—	—	—	—	—	—	68	—		Every Turn of the World
1985	"Every Turn of the World"	—	—	—	—	—	—	—	—	—	—	—		Every Turn of the World
1986	"Love Is Love (In Any Language)"	—	—	—	—	—	—	—	—	—	—	—		Every Turn of the World
1986	"That Girl"	—	—	—	—	—	—	—	—	—	—	—		Every Turn of the World
1986	"Loving Strangers"	94	—	—	—	—	—	—	—	—	—	27		Nothing in Common: Original Soundtrack Album
1988	"Swept Away"	—	—	—	—	—	—	—	—	—	—	—		Back of My Mind
1988	"I Will (Take You Forever)" (with Frances Ruffelle)	90	—	—	—	—	47	—	—	—	—	41		Back of My Mind
1988	"Someday"	—	—	—	—	—	—	—	—	—	—	—		Back of My Mind
1992	"In the Blink of an Eye" (Germany only)	—	51	—	—	—	—	—	—	—	—	—		Rendezvous (Germany & Japan only)
1992	"Nothing Will Change" (Germany only)	—	—	—	—	—	—	—	—	—	—	—		Rendezvous (Germany & Japan only)
1992	"Is There Something" (Germany only)	—	—	—	—	—	—	—	—	—	—	—		Rendezvous (Germany & Japan only)
1994	"Been There, Done That" (Germany only)	—	55	—	—	—	—	—	—	—	—	—		Window (Germany, Japan & US only)
1994	"Wild, Wild West" (Germany only)	—	—	—	—	—	—	—	—	—	—	—		Window (Germany, Japan & US only)
1995	"Open Up My Window"	—	—	—	—	—	—	—	—	—	—	—		Window (Germany, Japan & US only)
1998	"Walking in Avalon"	—	—	—	—	—	—	—	—	—	—	—		Walking in Avalon
1998	"When She Smiles"	—	—	—	—	—	—	—	—	—	—	—		Walking in Avalon
"—" denotes releases that did not chart

=== Other appearances ===
- 1974: Electromagnets, (with Eric Johnson) – "Motion"
- 1981: Chris Christian, Chris Christian (Boardwalk Records) – "Don't Give Up on Us" (guitar solo)
- 1982: Long Time Friends, Alessi Brothers – "Forever" (background vocals)
- 1985: Soul Kiss, Olivia Newton-John – "You Were Great, How Was I?" (background vocals)
- 1985: Crazy from the Heat, David Lee Roth – "California Girls" (background vocals)
- 1988: Brian Wilson, Brian Wilson – "Night Time" (background vocals)
- 1989: Christmas at My House, Larry Carlton – "Ringing the Bells of Christmas"
- 1991: Love Can Do That, Elaine Paige – "Same Train"
- 1994: Grammy's Greatest Moments Volume III – "Arthur's Theme" (live version)
- 1996: Venus Isle, Eric Johnson – "Lonely in the Night" (background vocals)
- 1996: On Air, Alan Parsons – "So Far Away"
- 1998: Imagination, Brian Wilson (special edition "Words and Music" bonus disc) – "In My Room"
- 2001: A Gathering of Friends, Michael McDonald – "Ride Like the Wind"
- 2001: When It All Goes South, Alabama – "Love Remains"
- 2004: Confidential, Peter White – "She's in Love"
- 2006: Skylark, Gigi Mackenzie – "That's All"
- 2008: Soundstage: America Live in Chicago – "Lonely People", "A Horse with No Name"
- 2013: Train Keeps a Rolling, Jeff Golub – "How Long"
- 2013: Imagination of You, Eric Johnson – "Imagination of You"

=== Music videos ===
Year	Title	Album
1980	"Ride Like the Wind"	Christopher Cross
1980	"Sailing"	Christopher Cross
1980	"Never Be the Same"	Christopher Cross
1981	"Arthur's Theme (Best That You Can Do)"	Arthur: The Album
1983	"All Right"	Another Page
1983	"Think of Laura"	Another Page
1985	"Charm the Snake"	Every Turn of the World
1985	"That Girl"	Every Turn of the World
1988	"I Will (Take You Forever)"	Back of My Mind

== Awards and nominations ==
Year	Award	Category	Nominated work	Result	Ref.
1981	Academy Awards	Best Original Song	"Arthur's Theme (Best That You Can Do)" (from Arthur)	Won	
1981	ASCAP Film and Television Music Awards	Most Performed Feature Film Standards	"Arthur's Theme (Best That You Can Do)" (from Arthur)	Won	
1981	Golden Globe Awards	Best Original Song	"Arthur's Theme (Best That You Can Do)" (from Arthur)	Won	
1980	Grammy Awards	Album of the Year	Christopher Cross	Won	
1980	Grammy Awards	Record of the Year	"Sailing"	Won	
1980	Grammy Awards	Song of the Year	"Sailing"	Won	
1980	Grammy Awards	Best New Artist	—N/a	Won	
1980	Grammy Awards	Best Pop Vocal Performance, Male	Christopher Cross	Nominated	
1980	Grammy Awards	Best Arrangement Accompanying Vocalist(s)	"Sailing"	Won	
1981	Grammy Awards	Record of the Year	"Arthur's Theme (Best That You Can Do)"	Nominated	
1981	Grammy Awards	Song of the Year	"Arthur's Theme (Best That You Can Do)"	Nominated	
1981	Grammy Awards	Best Pop Vocal Performance, Male	"Arthur's Theme (Best That You Can Do)"	Nominated	
1988	Primetime Emmy Awards	Outstanding Achievement in Music and Lyrics	"Swept Away" (from Growing Pains – Episode: "Aloha")	Nominated	
