= Never Be the Same (Christopher Cross song) =

Single by Christopher Cross

from the album Christopher Cross
- B-side: "The Light Is On"
- Released: September 24, 1980
- Recorded: 1979
- Length: 4:40 (album version); 4:08 (single version)
- Label: Warner Bros.
- Songwriter: Christopher Cross
- Producer: Michael Omartian

Christopher Cross singles chronology
"Sailing" (1980)	"Never Be the Same" (1980)	"Say You'll Be Mine" (1981)

Professional ratings
Review scores
Source	Rating
Billboard	(unrated)

"Never Be the Same" is the title of the third single by singer-songwriter Christopher Cross, released from his debut Grammy Award-winning album Christopher Cross. It was the singer's third consecutive single to reach the top 40 on the Billboard Hot 100 chart, where it peaked at No. 15 in 1980. The song was also a No. 1 hit on the Adult Contemporary chart, remaining there for two weeks.

== Personnel ==
- Christopher Cross – lead vocals, acoustic and electric guitars
- Tommy Taylor – drums
- Andy Salman – bass guitar
- Michael Omartian – acoustic piano
- Rob Meurer – electric piano and synthesizer
- Victor Feldman – vibraphone
- Lenny Castro – congas
- Jay Graydon – guitar solo
- Stormie Omartian, Myrna Matthews, Marty McCall – background vocals

== Chart history ==
=== Weekly charts ===
Chart (1980–81)	Peak position
Australia (Kent Music Report)	42
Canada RPM Adult Contemporary	43
Canada (Music Canada)	12
Ireland (IRMA)	25
New Zealand (Recorded Music NZ)	41
US Billboard Hot 100	15
US Billboard Adult Contemporary	1
US Cash Box Top 100	15

=== Year-end charts ===
Chart (1981)	Rank
US Billboard Adult Contemporary	31

== See also ==
- List of number-one adult contemporary singles of 1980 (U.S.)
