= Arthur's Theme (Best That You Can Do) =

1981 single by Christopher Cross

Single by Christopher Cross

from the album Arthur – The Album
- B-side: "Minstrel Gigolo"
- Released: August 14, 1981
- Recorded: 1981
- Genre: Pop; jazz pop; yacht rock
- Length: 3:53
- Label: Warner Bros.
- Songwriters: Christopher Cross; Burt Bacharach; Carole Bayer Sager; Peter Allen
- Producer: Michael Omartian

Christopher Cross singles chronology
"Say You'll Be Mine" (1981)	"Arthur's Theme (Best That You Can Do)" (1981)	"All Right" (1983)

Music video
- "Arthur's Theme (Best That You Can Do)" on YouTube

"Arthur's Theme (Best That You Can Do)" is a song performed and co-written by American singer-songwriter Christopher Cross as the main theme for the 1981 film Arthur.

It was recognized as the year's Best Original Song at both the 54th Academy Awards and 39th Golden Globe Awards.

A commercial success in the United States, it reached the top of both the Billboard Hot 100 and Hot Adult Contemporary charts in October 1981, remaining at the top of the Hot 100 for three consecutive weeks. The song topped the VG-lista chart in Norway and was a top-ten hit in several other countries.

== Background ==
The song was written in collaboration between Cross, Burt Bacharach, and Bacharach's frequent writing partner and future wife Carole Bayer Sager. A fourth writing credit went to Liza Minnelli's ex-husband, Australian songwriter Peter Allen, a frequent collaborator with Bayer Sager. The line in the chorus "When you get caught between the moon and New York City" was taken from an unreleased song written by Allen and Bayer Sager. Allen came up with the line while his plane was in a holding pattern during a night arrival at John F. Kennedy International Airport. The song also features Toto members Steve Lukather, Jeff Porcaro and David Hungate.

== Release ==
The song "Minstrel Gigolo" served as the record's B-side, having previously backed Cross's debut single, "Ride Like the Wind".

Cross included "Arthur's Theme (Best That You Can Do)" as a bonus track exclusive to cassette and CD versions of his 1983 album Another Page.

== Music video ==
The music video consists of two acts, which are edited together in fade outs. In one, Christopher Cross performs the song with musicians in a recording studio, and the other is the story the song illustrates.

== Reception ==
The song won an Academy Award for Best Original Song at the 54th Academy Awards. The song was also recognized as the year's Best Original Song at the 39th Golden Globe Awards.

The song ranked No. 79 among the AFI's 100 Years...100 Songs survey in 2004.

== Personnel ==
- Christopher Cross – lead and backing vocals, guitar
- Michael Omartian – keyboards, synthesizers, string arrangements
- Michael Boddicker – synthesizer programming
- Steve Lukather – guitar
- Marty Walsh – guitar
- David Hungate – bass
- Jeff Porcaro – drums
- Paulinho da Costa – percussion
- Ernie Watts – saxophone
- Frank DeCaro - music contractor

== Charts and certifications ==
=== Weekly charts ===
Chart (1981–1982)	Peak position
Australia (Kent Music Report)	13
Canada Adult Contemporary (RPM)	1
Canada Top Singles (RPM)	2
Ireland (IRMA)	7
Italy (FIMI)	5
New Zealand (Recorded Music NZ)	10
Norway (VG-lista)	1
South Africa (Springbok SA Top 20)	7
Spain (AFYVE)	14
Switzerland (Schweizer Hitparade)	6
UK Singles (The Official Charts Company)	7
US Adult Contemporary (Billboard)	1
US Billboard Hot 100	1
US Mainstream Rock Airplay (Billboard)	13

=== Year-end charts ===
Year-end chart (1981)	Rank
Canada Top Singles (RPM)	18
Italy (FIMI)	19
US Top Pop Singles (Billboard)	64
Year-end chart (1982)	Rank
US Top Pop Singles (Billboard)	98

=== Certifications ===
Region	Certification	Certified units/sales
New Zealand (RMNZ)	Gold	15,000^{‡}
United Kingdom (BPI)	Silver	200,000^{‡}
United States (RIAA)	Gold	1,000,000^{^}
^{^} Shipments figures based on certification alone.^{‡} Sales+streaming figures based on certification alone.

== See also ==
- Academy Award for Best Original Song
- Golden Globe Award for Best Original Song
- List of Billboard Hot 100 number ones of 1981
- List of Billboard Adult Contemporary number ones of 1981
- List of number-one hits in Norway
