= All Right =

1983 single by Christopher Cross

Single by Christopher Cross

from the album Another Page
- B-side: "Long World"
- Released: January 5, 1983
- Recorded: 1982
- Genre: Pop rock
- Length: 4:16 (album version); 4:01 (single version)
- Label: Warner Bros.
- Songwriter: Christopher Cross
- Producer: Michael Omartian

Christopher Cross singles chronology
"Arthur's Theme (Best That You Can Do)" (1981)	"All Right" (1983)	"No Time for Talk" (1983)

Audio
- "All Right" on YouTube

"All Right" is a song written and recorded by American singer-songwriter Christopher Cross. It was released in January 1983 as the lead single from his second studio album, Another Page. On the heels of his Grammy-winning first album, and following his No. 1 hits "Sailing" and "Arthur's Theme (Best That You Can Do)", expectations were strong enough for it to debut on the Billboard Hot 100 at No. 29. It was the fifth-highest debuting single of the 1980s, ranking behind Michael Jackson's "Thriller" (No. 20), USA for Africa's "We Are the World" (No. 21), Paul McCartney's and Michael Jackson's "Say Say Say" (No. 26), and Men at Work's "Overkill" (No. 28). The single, which featured former Doobie Brother member Michael McDonald on background vocals, eventually peaked at No. 12. The song also featured Toto members Jeff Porcaro, Mike Porcaro, and Steve Lukather.

The song was used by CBS Sports for its highlight montage of the 1983 NCAA Division I men's basketball tournament at the end of its broadcast of the championship game. The game, which saw North Carolina State, led by coach Jim Valvano, upset heavily favored Houston 54–52 when Lorenzo Charles caught an airballed shot by teammate Dereck Whittenburg and slammed the ball through the hoop on the game's final play, is widely regarded as one of the most memorable games in NCAA tournament history. Four years later, CBS introduced "One Shining Moment" to accompany tournament highlights at the end of the championship game broadcast, a tradition which continues.

"All Right" was featured in the NBA footage bloopers during the 1982–83 season.

== Track listing ==
1. "All Right" - 4:01
2. "Long World" - 3:32

== Personnel ==
- Christopher Cross – lead vocals, guitar
- Michael Omartian – keyboards, synthesizer, arrangements
- Mike Porcaro – bass guitar
- Steve Lukather – electric guitar, guitar solo
- Jeff Porcaro – drums
- Rob Meurer – keyboards, synthesizer programming, synthesizer, arrangements
- Michael McDonald – background vocals
- Paulinho Da Costa – percussion
- Lenny Castro – percussion

== Charts ==
Chart (1983)	Peak position
Belgium (Ultratop 50 Flanders)	15
Canada Top Singles (RPM)	13
Canada Adult Contemporary (RPM)	1
Germany (GfK)	23
Ireland (IRMA)	14
Italy (FIMI)	13
Netherlands (Dutch Top 40)	16
Netherlands (Single Top 100)	15
New Zealand (Recorded Music NZ)	44
Norway (VG-lista)	5
Spain (AFYVE)	4
Switzerland (Schweizer Hitparade)	5
UK Singles (Official Charts)	51
US Billboard Hot 100	12
US Adult Contemporary (Billboard)	3
U.S. Cashbox Top 100	9
U.S. Radio & Records CHR/Pop Airplay Chart	3

Year-end chart (1983)	Rank
US Top Pop Singles (Billboard)	70
