= Sailing (Christopher Cross song) =

1980 single by Christopher Cross

Single by Christopher Cross

from the album Christopher Cross
- B-side: "Poor Shirley"
- Released: May 1980
- Recorded: 1979
- Genre: Soft rock; yacht rock
- Length: 4:14
- Label: Warner Bros.
- Songwriter: Christopher Cross
- Producer: Michael Omartian

Christopher Cross singles chronology
"Ride Like the Wind" (1980)	"Sailing" (1980)	"Never Be the Same" (1980)

Music video
- "Christopher Cross - Sailing (Official Music Video)" on YouTube

"Sailing" is a 1979 soft rock song written and recorded by American singer-songwriter Christopher Cross. It was released in May 1980 as the second single from his first album Christopher Cross (1979), which was already certified gold by this time. The song was a success in the United States, reaching number one on the Billboard Hot 100 chart on August 30, 1980, where it stayed for one week. The song also won Grammy Awards for Record of the Year, Song of the Year, and Arrangement of the Year, and helped Cross win the Best New Artist award. In his Grammy acceptance speech, Cross acknowledged "Sailing" as his favorite song on the album and said that it was not originally meant to be a single.

The song was recorded in 1979, utilizing the 3M Digital Recording System, making it one of the first digitally recorded songs to chart.

In 2007, VH1 named "Sailing" the most "softsational soft rock" song of all time. Following its feature on the Yacht Rock web series, the song was identified as an archetype of the yacht rock style. Cross and similar artists referred to the style as the West Coast sound during 1975–1985.

== Background ==
Cross has said in interviews that the song's inspiration was his friendship with an older friend from his high school, Al Glasscock, who would take him sailing as a teenager, just to get away from the trials and tribulations of being a teenager. Glasscock functioned as a surrogate older brother during a tough time for Cross emotionally. Although Cross lost touch with Glasscock, The Howard Stern Show in April 1995 reunited the two after 28 years. Cross acknowledged on the show that his sailing trips with Glasscock had been the inspiration for the song. After that reunion, Cross sent Glasscock a copy of the platinum record he earned for selling more than five million copies of "Sailing." Cross has also said in interviews that the orchestral beginning was an error of a wrong button pushed in the recording of the song, and then the acoustic part caught up with it. It was meant to start with the acoustic guitar part.

== Legacy ==
- "Sailing" was covered in 1997 by American boy band NSYNC on their first album NSYNC. NSYNC and Christopher Cross performed the song together at the 1999 Blockbuster Entertainment Awards.
- "Sailing" was sampled on "Bagsy Not in Net" by the 1975 from their album Notes on a Conditional Form.
- The song can be heard in the 2006 movie Flushed Away during a water chase scene.
- The song can be partially heard in the 2022 Michael Bay movie Ambulance; a suggestion by actor Jake Gyllenhaal.
- The song is referenced in the January 30, 2023 episode of the web series Backrooms, with the album cover being seen in the 2026 film adaptation, Backrooms.
- The song was also heard in two episodes of the TV series Landman.
- In The Beauty, Anthony Ramos was seen singing along to the song in episode 3.

== Personnel ==
- Christopher Cross – vocals, 12-string electric guitar, arrangements
- Andy Salmon – bass
- Michael Omartian – acoustic piano, arrangements
- Rob Meurer – electric piano, arrangements
- Victor Feldman – percussion
- Tommy Taylor – drums

== Charts ==
Chart (1980–1981)	Peak position
Australia (Kent Music Report)	46
Belgium (Ultratop 50 Flanders)	38
Canada Top Singles (RPM)	1
Canada Adult Contemporary (RPM)	1
Ireland (IRMA)	21
Italy (FIMI)	12
Netherlands (Dutch Top 40)	18
Netherlands (Single Top 100)	41
New Zealand (Recorded Music NZ)	8
Spain (AFYVE)	24
UK Singles (Official Charts)	48
US Billboard Hot 100	1
US Adult Contemporary (Billboard)	10

=== Year-end charts ===
Chart (1980)	Rank
Canada Top Singles (RPM)	24
US Billboard Hot 100	32

Chart (1981)	Rank
Italy (FIMI)	66

== Certifications ==
Region	Certification	Certified units/sales
New Zealand (RMNZ)	Platinum	30,000^{‡}
United Kingdom (BPI)	Silver	200,000^{‡}
^{‡} Sales+streaming figures based on certification alone.

== See also ==
- List of Billboard Hot 100 number-one singles of 1980
