= Michael Omartian =

American singer-songwriter (b. 1945)

Michael S. Omartian (/oʊˈmɑːrtiən/ oh-MAR-tee-un; born November 26, 1945) is an American singer-songwriter, arranger, keyboardist, and music producer. He produced number-one records in three consecutive decades. He has earned 11 Grammy Awards nominations and won three. He spent five years on the A&R staff of ABC/Dunhill Records as a producer, artist, and arranger; then was hired by Warner Bros. Records as an in-house producer and A&R staff member. Omartian moved from Los Angeles to Nashville in 1993, where he served on the Board of Governors of the Recording Academy, and has helped to shape the curriculum for the first master's degree program in the field of Music Business at Belmont University.

Artists who Omartian has produced albums for include Clint Black, Michael Bolton, Debby Boone, Steve Camp, Peter Cetera, Christopher Cross, Joe "Bean" Esposito, Amy Grant, Benny Hester, Whitney Houston, The Imperials, Jermaine Jackson, The Jacksons, Billy Joel, Reba McEntire, Dolly Parton, Cliff Richard, Steely Dan, Rod Stewart, Donna Summer, Wayne Watson, and Trisha Yearwood.

== Life and career ==
Omartian was born in Evanston, Illinois, of Armenian descent.

In the late 1960s, Omartian helped launch Campus Crusade for Christ's music outreach group The New Folk, arranging much of the music and helping to train the singers.

He was a founding member of the 1970s disco-funk band Rhythm Heritage. He played as a session musician for artists including Koinonia, the Four Tops, Johnny Rivers, Seals and Crofts, Al Jarreau, and Loggins & Messina. In 1973, Omartian arranged and played accordion on Billy Joel's song "Piano Man". In 1974 he played acoustic piano on Steely Dan's most commercially successful single, "Rikki Don't Lose That Number".

Omartian has recorded contemporary Christian music albums under his own name, including White Horse, Mainstream, Adam Again, and Conversations (an instrumental album). Omartian has also produced several Christian albums for others, most notably the Imperials' albums One More Song for You (1979) and Priority (1980).

In 1980, thanks to Christopher Cross' eponymous debut album, Omartian was nominated for four Grammy Awards, including Producer of the Year, and won three, for Record of the Year ("Sailing"), Album of the Year (Christopher Cross) and Best Arrangement Accompanying Vocalist ("Sailing"). He received a fifth nomination that year for Best Gospel Performance, Contemporary or Inspirational, for his own album, The Builder, written and performed with his wife, Stormie.

In 1985, Omartian was arranger and a keyboard player for the No. 1 hit "We Are the World" by the supergroup USA for Africa.

In 2003, Omartian scored an audio book rendition of the biblical gospels, called Gospels Come to Life. The audio Bible was read by fellow CCM writer/musician Michael W. Smith, based on musical ideas by Smith. The Spanish-language version of this audio Bible was narrated by CCM artist Jaci Velasquez.

Toward the end of 2006, Omartian contributed to an album with Annie Herring (of 2nd Chapter of Acts) called One on One; he plays piano as the solo instrument throughout with Herring providing vocals. One on One was his second collaboration with Herring, the first being the 1983 album Together Live, a collaborative, in-concert effort with Herring's family trio, 2nd Chapter of Acts, and Omartian's wife Stormie. The live double-LP album was recorded in 1982 at The Church on the Way in Van Nuys, California. The album was also released in video format.

Omartian produced number-one records in three separate decades: the 1970s, 1980s, and 1990s. He was nominated for Producer of the Year in 1980, 1984, and 1986. In 1991, he was nominated for Album of the Year for Heart in Motion by Amy Grant. In 1995, he was nominated for Country Song of the Year for "When Love Finds You," with Vince Gill, and for Gospel Album of the Year for The Light Inside, with Gary Chapman. In 1994, Omartian produced One Voice, an album for the Summer Olympic Games. His song "Atlanta Reel" was used as the theme for the swimming events.

== Discography ==
- White Horse (1974)
- Adam Again (1977)
- Seasons of the Soul (1979)
- Mainstream (1982)
- Conversations (1986)
- The Race (1991)

== Awards ==
Grammy Awards In 1980, he was nominated for ten Grammy Awards, three of which he won for producing and arranging on Christopher Cross' debut album:

- 1980: Best Arrangement Accompanying Vocalist(s) for "Sailing" (with Christopher Cross)
- 1980: Record of the Year for "Sailing"
- 1980: Album of the Year for Christopher Cross

GMA Dove Awards

- 1981: Pop/Contemporary Album of the Year for One More Song for You (The Imperials)
- 1982: Pop/Contemporary Album of the Year for Priority (The Imperials)
- 1997: Instrumental Album of the Year for The Players (with Dann Huff, Tommy Sims, Tom Hemby, Terry McMillan, Chris Rodriguez, Shane Keister, Mark Douthit, Eric Darken)
