= The Power of Joe Simon =

Studio album by Joe Simon
- Released: 1973
- Genre: Soul, R&B
- Label: Spring
- Producer: Raeford Gerald, Kenneth Gamble, Leon Huff, Joe Simon, John Richbourg

Joe Simon chronology
Drowning in the Sea of Love (1972)	The Power of Joe Simon (1973)	Simon Country (1973)

Singles from The Power of Joe Simon
- 1. "Drowning in the Sea of Love" Released: November 25, 1971; 2. "Power of Love" Released: June 20, 1972

Professional ratings
Review scores
Source	Rating
AllMusic	4/5 stars

The Power of Joe Simon is the eighth studio album recorded by American singer Joe Simon, released in 1973 on the Spring Records label.

== Chart performance ==
The album peaked at No. 15 on the R&B albums chart. It also reached No. 97 on the Billboard 200. The album features the singles "Power of Love", which peaked at No. 1 on the Hot Soul Singles chart and No. 11 on the Billboard Hot 100, "Trouble in My Home", which reached No. 5 on the Hot Soul Singles Chart and No. 50 on the Billboard Hot 100, and "Step by Step", which charted at No. 6 on the Hot Soul Singles chart, No. 67 on the Billboard Hot 100 and No. 14 on the UK Singles Chart.

== Track listing ==
Side one
No.	Title	Writer(s)	Length
1.	"Step by Step"	Raeford Gerald	3:02
2.	"Your Time to Cry"	Raeford Gerald, Joe Simon, Dock Price, Jr.	2:57
3.	"Drowning in the Sea of Love"	Kenneth Gamble, Leon Huff	3:22
4.	"You Are the One"	Joe Simon	2:55
5.	"Trouble in My Home"	Raeford Gerald, Joe Simon	3:29

Side two
No.	Title	Writer(s)	Length
6.	"Talk Don't Bother Me"	Raeford Gerald, Joe Simon	2:55
7.	"To Lay Down Beside You"	Tim Drummond	3:15
8.	"Power of Love"	Kenneth Gamble, Leon Huff, Joe Simon	2:45
9.	"Help Me Make It Through the Night"	Kris Kristofferson	2:40
10.	"Georgia Blue"	Larry Neal	2:55

== Charts ==
Chart (1973)	Peak
U.S. Billboard Top LPs	97
U.S. Billboard Top Soul LPs	15

Singles

Year	Single	Peaks	
Year	Single	US	US R&B
1972	"Power of Love"	11	1
1972	"Trouble in My Home"	50	5
1973	"Step by Step"	37	6
