= Get Down =

Get Down may refer to:

- Get down, a stance or movement in traditional African culture, in African American culture, and throughout the Black African diaspora

== Film and television ==
- Get Down (film) or Treed Murray, a 2001 Canadian film
- The Get Down, an American musical drama television series

== Music ==
=== Albums ===
- Get Down (album), by Joe Simon (1975)
- Get Down! (album), by Soulive (1999)
- The Get Down (soundtrack), from the television series (2016)
- Get Down!, by The Hi-Fives (1998)

=== Songs ===
- "Get Down" (b4-4 song) (2000)
- "Get Down" (Craig Mack song) (1994)
- "Get Down" (Gilbert O'Sullivan song) (1973)
- "Get Down" (Groove Armada song) (2007)
- "Get Down" (James Arthur song) (2014)
- "Get Down" (Laurent Wéry song) (2010)
- "Get Down" (Nas song) (2003)
- "Get Down" (Tiësto and Tony Junior song) (2015)
- "Get Down (You're the One for Me)", a song by the Backstreet Boys (1996)
- "Get Down", by Audio Adrenaline from Underdog
- "Get Down", by Badfinger from No Dice
- "Get Down", by Big Daddy Kane from Prince of Darkness
- "Get Down", by Black Eyed Peas and Nicky Jam from Elevation
- "Get Down", by Blue from One Love
- "Get Down", by Busta Rhymes from The Big Bang
- "Get Down", by the Butthole Surfers from Weird Revolution
- "Get Down", by Cam'ron from Purple Haze
- "Get Down", by Curtis Mayfield from Roots
- "Get Down", by Emmalyn Estrada
- "Get Down", by Everlast from Whitey Ford Sings the Blues
- "Get Down", by G-Unit from T.O.S: Terminate on Sight
- "Get Down", by Gene Chandler
- "Get Down", by Gotthard from their self-titled debut album
- "Get Down", by Hardwell and W&W
- "Get Down", by Lil Wayne from Tha Carter
- "Get Down", by LL Cool J from Bigger and Deffer
- "Get Down", by M-D-Emm
- "Get Down", by Monica from Miss Thang
- "Get Down", by War from All Day Music
- "Get Down", from the musical Six (musical)

== See also ==
- "Get Down Saturday Night", a song by Oliver Cheatham
- "Get Down Tonight", a song by KC and the Sunshine Band
- "Get Down, Get Down (Get on the Floor)", a song by Joe Simon
- "To Get Down", a song by Timo Maas
- Geddan (ゲッダン), a video game glitch meme originating from Kohmi Hirose's song "Promise"
