= Sammi Smith discography =

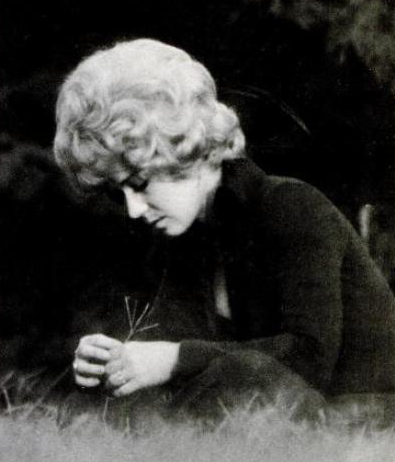
- Sammi Smith in 1970
- Studio albums: 13
- Compilation albums: 4
- Singles: 43

The discography of country music singer Sammi Smith consists of thirteen studio albums, four compilation albums and forty-three singles.

== Studio albums ==
=== 1970s ===
Title	Details	Peak chart positions	
Title	Details	US Country	US
Help Me Make It Through the Night^{[A]}	Release date: September 1970; Label: Mega Records	1	33
Lonesome	Release date: September 1971; Label: Mega Records	15	191
Something Old, Something New, Something Blue	Release date: April 1972; Label: Mega Records	17	—
The Toast of '45	Release date: March 1973; Label: Mega Records	43	—
The Rainbow in Daddy's Eyes	Release date: April 1974; Label: Mega Records	—	—
Sunshine	Release date: 1975; Label: Mega Records	—	—
Today I Started Loving You Again	Release date: April 1975; Label: Mega Records	19	—
As Long as There's Sunday	Release date: 1976; Label: Elektra Records	43	—
Mixed Emotions	Release date: 1977; Label: Elektra Records	47	—
New Winds, All Quadrants	Release date: 1978; Label: Elektra Records	—	—
Girl Hero	Release date: 1979; Label: Cyclone Records	—	—
"—" denotes releases that did not chart

=== 1980s–1990s ===
Title	Details
Better Than Ever	Release date: 1986; Label: Step One Records
Here Comes That Rainbow Again	Release date: 1991; Label: Playback Records

== Compilation albums ==
Title	Details	Peak positions
Title	Details	US Country
The World of Sammi Smith	Release date: April 1971; Label: Harmony Records	—
The Best of Sammi Smith	Release date: 1972; Label: Mega Records	25
Greatest Hits	Release date: 1974; Label: Mega Records	—
Her Way	Release date: 1976; Label: Zodiac Records	47
The Best of Sammi Smith	Release date: October 22, 1996; Label: Varèse Sarabande	—
"—" denotes releases that did not chart

== Singles ==
=== 1960s–1970s ===
Year	Single	Peak chart positions						Album
Year	Single	US Country	US AC	US	AUS	CAN Country	CAN	Album
1967	"He Went a Little Bit Farther"	—	—	—	—	—	—	The World of Sammi Smith
1968	"So Long Charlie Brown, Don't Look for Me Around"	69	—	—	—	—	—	The World of Sammi Smith
1968	"Why Do You Like Me Like You Do"	53	—	—	—	—	—	The World of Sammi Smith
1968	"Sand-Covered Angels"	—	—	—	—	—	—	The World of Sammi Smith
1969	"Brownsville Lumberyard"	58	—	—	—	—	—	The World of Sammi Smith
1970	"He's Everywhere"	25	—	—	—	—	—	Help Me Make It Through the Night
1970	"Help Me Make It Through the Night"	1	3	8	7	1	4	Help Me Make It Through the Night
1971	"Then You Walk in"	10	30	118	—	16	87	Lonesome
1971	"For the Kids"	27	—	—	—	—	—	Lonesome
1971	"Saunders' Ferry Lane"	—	—	—	—	—	—	Help Me Make It Through the Night
1972	"Kentucky"	38	—	—	—	—	—	Something Old, Something New, Something Blue
1972	"Girl in New Orleans"	36	—	—	—	—	—	Something Old, Something New, Something Blue
1972	"I've Got to Have You"	13	35	77	98	24	—	Something Old, Something New, Something Blue
1972	"The Toast of '45"	51	—	—	—	72	—	The Toast of '45
1973	"I Miss You Most When You're Right Here"	62	—	—	—	68	—	The Toast of '45
1973	"City of New Orleans"	44	—	—	—	73	—	The Toast of '45
1974	"The Rainbow in Daddy's Eyes"	16	—	—	—	22	—	The Rainbow in Daddy's Eyes
1974	"Never Been to Spain"	75	—	—	—	—	—	The Rainbow in Daddy's Eyes
1974	"Long Black Veil"	26	—	—	—	28	—	Sunshine
1975	"Cover Me"	33	—	—	—	—	—	Sunshine
1975	"She's in Love with a Rodeo Man"	—	—	—	—	—	—	Sunshine
1975	"Today I Started Loving You Again"	9	—	—	—	—	—	Today I Started Loving You Again
1976	"My Window Faces the South"	51	—	—	—	—	—	Today I Started Loving You Again
1976	"Huckleberry Pie"(with Even Stevens)	81	—	—	—	—	—	—N/a
1976	"As Long as There's a Sunday"	43	—	—	—	—	—	As Long as There's a Sunday
1976	"I'll Get Better"	60	—	—	—	—	—	As Long as There's a Sunday
1976	"Sunday School to Broadway"	29	—	—	—	—	—	—N/a
1976	"Just You 'n' Me"	71	—	—	—	—	—	Her Way
1976	"Rings for Sale"	—	—	—	—	—	—	Her Way
1977	"Loving Arms"	19	—	—	—	—	—	Mixed Emotions
1977	"I Can't Stop Loving You"	27	—	—	—	—	—	Mixed Emotions
1977	"Days That End in Y"	23	—	—	—	—	—	Mixed Emotions
1978	"It Just Won't Feel Like Cheating (With You)"	48	—	—	—	—	—	New Winds, Old Quadrants
1978	"Norma Jean"	73	—	—	—	—	—	New Winds, Old Quadrants
1979	"What a Lie"	16	—	—	—	—	—	Girl Hero
1979	"The Letter"	27	—	—	—	—	—	Girl Hero
"—" denotes releases that did not chart

=== 1980s–1990s ===
Year	Single	Peak chart positions		Album
Year	Single	US Country	CAN Country	Album
1980	"I Just Want to Be with You"	36	—	—N/a
1981	"Cheatin's a Two Way Street"	16	—	—N/a
1981	"Waltz Across Texas"	—	—	—N/a
1981	"Sometimes I Cry When I'm Alone"	34	—	—N/a
1981	"Ozark Mountain Jubilee"	—	—	—N/a
1982	"Gypsy and Joe"	69	—	—N/a
1985	"You Just Hurt My Last Feelin'"	76	—	Better Than Ever
1985	"An Offer I Couldn't Refuse"	—	—	Better Than Ever
1986	"Love Me All Over"	80	—	Better Than Ever
1990	"Gonna Lay Me Down Beside My Memories"	—	58	Here Comes That Rainbow Again
1992	"Cloudy Days"	—	—	Here Comes That Rainbow Again
"—" denotes releases that did not chart

== Notes ==
- A Help Me Make It Through the Night also peaked at No. 51 on the RPM Canadian Albums chart.
