= Ready for the Night =

Ready for the Night may refer to:

- "Ready for the Night" (song), a 2010 song by Laurent Wéry
- Ready for the Night (album), a 2010 album by Laurent Wéry
