= Marilyn Sellars =

American country music and gospel singer (born 1944)

- Born: Marilyn Esther Sellars; December 31, 1938; Northfield, Minnesota, U.S.
- Died: May 28, 2025 (aged 86) Edina, Minnesota, U.S.
- Genres: Christian, Country
- Occupation: singer
- Instrument: Vocals
- Years active: 1973–present
- Label: Mega

Marilyn Sellars (December 31, 1944 - May 28, 2025) was an American country music and gospel singer who had several hits during the mid-1970s on Mega Records, most notably the original version of "One Day at a Time" in 1974.

== Early career ==
Sellars grew up in Dundas near Northfield, Minnesota. She started singing in church at the age of three singing "Oh, What A Beautiful Morning". Sellars began singing at functions and clubs around Minnesota as a teenager and after high school graduation in 1956, sang a variety of music with country and Gospel music being her favorites. Many of her family and friends enjoyed her singing and suggested Sellars moved to Nashville, Tennessee in 1973.

== Breakthrough ==
Sellars signed with Mega Records in 1973 and success began quite rapidly with a song written by Marijohn Wilkin and Kris Kristofferson called "One Day at a Time". This would become a hit for Sellars in 1974 and reached No. 19 on the country charts and No. 37 on the Billboard Hot 100 charts. The album of the same name went to No. 11 on the country charts. The song would become an even bigger hit for Cristy Lane in 1980 going to number No. 1 on the country charts. Sellars had another Top 40 country hit in early 1975 with her cover version of Sammi Smith's "He's Everywhere" and released two more albums that year with Gather Me and The Door I Used To Close. Sellars had two minor hits in both 1975 and 1976 with the title tracks of both albums. After that, Mega Records closed its doors and Sellars faded quietly from view and decided to raise her family and moved back to Minnesota.

== Later Life ==
Sellars continued to perform released several albums of country and gospel music, the most recent of these being the 2006 release of One Day at a Time: My Faith, My Country. In 2004, she was inducted into the Minnesota Country and Rock Hall of Fame.

== Death ==
Sellars passed on May 28, 2025 in Edina, Minnesota.

== Discography ==
=== Albums ===
| Year | Album details | US Country |
|---|---|---|
| 1974 | One Day at a Time: Released: 1974; Label: Mega Records | 11 |
| 1975 | Gather Me: Released: 1975; Label: Mega Records | |
| 1976 | Moods of Marilyn: Released: 1976; Label: Zodiac Records | |

=== Singles ===
| Year | Single | Chart Positions | | Album | Release date |
| Year | Single | US Country | US | Album | Release date |
|---|---|---|---|---|---|
| 1974 | "One Day at a Time" | 19 | 37 | One Day at a Time | May 1974 |
| 1974 | "He's Everywhere" | 39 | — | Gather Me | November 1974 |
| 1975 | "Gather Me" | 84 | — | Gather Me | 1975 |
| 1976 | "The Door I Used to Close" | 91 | — | single only | January 1976 |
"—" denotes the single failed to chart or not released

== Marilyn's first album ==
One Day at a Time was Marilyn's first 1974 album. It peaked at #11 at the Top Country Albums of that year.

One Day at a Time

Studio album by Marilyn Sellars
- Released: 1974
- Recorded: 1974
- Genre: Country
- Label: Mega

Marilyn Sellars chronology
| Sing Me a Song (To Make Me Happy) (1973) | One Day at a Time (1974) | He's Everywhere (1974) |

Singles from One Day at a Time
- 1. "One Day at a Time" Released: May 1974

Side one

1. "One Day at a Time" – 3:31
2. "How Is He" – 2:27
3. "The Rain's Got to Make a Living Too" – 2:45
4. "When I Said Goodbye" – 3:01
5. "California" - 2:44

Side two

1. "When He Loved Me" – 3:29
2. "Good Love (I Knew I'd Find You)" – 2:10
3. "Sing Me a Song (To Make Me Happy)" – 2:54
4. "Burden of Freedom" – 3:36
5. "Friendship" – 2:46
