= The Sounds of Simon =

Studio album by Joe Simon
- Released: 1971
- Recorded: Music City Studios (Nashville, Tennessee)
- Genre: Soul, R&B
- Label: Spring
- Producer: John Richbourg, Joe Simon

Joe Simon chronology
Joe Simon...Better Than Ever (1969)	The Sounds of Simon (1971)	Drowning in the Sea of Love (1972)

Professional ratings
Review scores
Source	Rating
AllMusic	3/5 stars

The Sounds of Simon is the sixth studio album recorded by American singer Joe Simon, released in 1971 on the Spring Records label.

== Chart performance ==
The album peaked at No. 9 on the R&B albums chart. It also reached No. 153 on the Billboard 200. The album features the singles "Your Time to Cry", which peaked at No. 3 on the Hot Soul Singles chart and No. 40 on the Billboard Hot 100, and "Help Me Make It Through the Night", which reached No. 13 on the Hot Soul Singles Chart and No. 69 on the Billboard Hot 100.

== Track listing ==
Side one
No.	Title	Writer(s)	Length
1.	"To Lay Down Beside You"	Tim Drummond	3:15
2.	"I Can't See Nobody"	Robin Gibb, Barry Gibb	4:15
3.	"Most of All"	Buddy Buie, J. R. Cobb	2:40
4.	"No More Me"	Cecil Doty	2:29
5.	"Your Time to Cry"	Joe Simon, Raeford Gerald, Dock Price, Jr.	2:57

Side two
No.	Title	Writer(s)	Length
6.	"Help Me Make It Through the Night"	Kris Kristofferson	2:40
7.	"My Woman, My Woman, My Wife"	Marty Robbins	4:34
8.	"I Love You More (Than Anything)"	Joe Simon, Raeford Gerald, Dock Price, Jr.	2:05
9.	"Georgia Blue"	Larry Neal	2:52
10.	"All My Hard Times"	Joe South	2:38

== Charts ==
Chart (1971)	Peak
U.S. Billboard Top LPs	153
U.S. Billboard Top Soul LPs	9

Singles

Year	Single	Peaks	
Year	Single	US	US R&B
1970	"Your Time to Cry"	40	3
1971	"Help Me Make It Through the Night"	69	13
1971	"To Lay Down Beside You"	—	—
1971	"All My Hard Times"	93	19
1971	"Georgia Blue"	—	19
