= Drowning in the Sea of Love (album) =

Studio album by Joe Simon
- Released: 1972
- Studio: Sigma Sound, Philadelphia, Pennsylvania
- Genre: Soul, R&B
- Label: Spring
- Producer: Kenneth Gamble, Leon Huff

Joe Simon chronology
The Sounds of Simon (1971)	Drowning in the Sea of Love (1972)	The Power of Joe Simon (1973)

Professional ratings
Review scores
Source	Rating
AllMusic	4.5/5 stars
Christgau's Record Guide	B
The Rolling Stone Album Guide	3.5/5 stars

Drowning in the Sea of Love is the seventh studio album by the American singer Joe Simon, released in 1972 on the Spring Records label.

== Chart performance ==
The album peaked at No. 11 on the R&B albums chart. It also reached No. 71 on the Billboard 200. The album features the title track, which peaked at No. 3 on the Hot Soul Singles chart and No. 11 on the Billboard Hot 100, "Pool of Bad Luck", which reached No. 13 on the Hot Soul Singles Chart and No. 42 on the Billboard Hot 100, and "I Found My Dad", which charted at No. 5 on the Hot Soul Singles chart and No. 50 on the Billboard Hot 100.

== Track listing ==
Side one
No.	Title	Writer(s)	Length
1.	"Drowning in the Sea of Love"	Kenneth Gamble, Leon Huff	3:22
2.	"Glad to Be Your Lover"	Bunny Sigler, Phil Hurtt	2:56
3.	"Something You Can Do Today"	Kenneth Gamble, Leon Huff	4:16
4.	"I Found My Dad"	Bunny Sigler, Phil Hurtt	2:48
5.	"The Mirror Don't Lie"	Bunny Sigler, Phil Hurtt	4:31

Side two
No.	Title	Writer(s)	Length
6.	"O'le Night Owl"	Kenneth Gamble, Leon Huff	2:37
7.	"You Are Everything"	Linda Creed, Thom Bell	4:13
8.	"If"	Bunny Sigler, Phil Hurtt	3:21
9.	"Let Me Be the One (The One Who Loves You)"	Kenneth Gamble, Leon Huff	3:00
10.	"Pool of Bad Luck"	Kenneth Gamble, Leon Huff	4:50

== Personnel ==
- Roland Chambers, Norman Harris, T.J. Tindall – guitars
- Ronnie Baker – bass
- Earl Young – percussion
- Larry Washington – conga, bongos
- Vincent Montana Jr. – vibes
- Leon Huff – piano, electric piano

== Charts ==
Chart (1972)	Peak
U.S. Billboard Top LPs	71
U.S. Billboard Top Soul LPs	11

Singles

Year	Single	Peaks	
Year	Single	US	US R&B
1971	"Drowning in the Sea of Love"	11	3
1972	"Pool of Bad Luck"	42	13
1972	"I Found My Dad"	50	5
