= Power of Love (Joe Simon song) =

Single by Joe Simon

from the album The Power of Joe Simon
- B-side: "The Mirror Didn't Lie"
- Released: 1972
- Recorded: 1972
- Genre: Soul
- Length: 2:45
- Label: Spring
- Songwriters: Joe Simon, Kenny Gamble, Leon Huff

Joe Simon singles chronology
"Pool of Bad Luck" (1972)	"Power of Love" (1972)	"Misty Blue" (1972)

"Power Of Love" is a 1972 song written by Joe Simon along with Kenny Gamble and Leon Huff, and recorded by Joe Simon. The single was his second to hit #1 on the R&B charts, where it was at the top spot for two weeks. "Power Of Love" also made it into the Top 20 on the Pop charts, where it was one of Simon's most successful crossover singles. Billboard ranked it as the No. 83 song for 1972. It became a Gold single, certified by the RIAA on August 29, 1972.

== Chart positions ==
Charts	Peak position
US Billboard Hot 100	11
US Hot R&B/Hip-Hop Songs (Billboard)	1
