= Drowning in the Sea of Love =

Single by Joe Simon

from the album Drowning in the Sea of Love
- B-side: "Just A Dream"
- Released: November 1971
- Recorded: 1971
- Genre: Soul
- Label: Spring Records
- Songwriter(s): Kenny Gamble and Leon Huff

Joe Simon singles chronology
"All My Hard Times" (1971)	"Drowning in the Sea of Love" (1971)	"Pool of Bad Luck" (1972)

Official audio
- "Drowning in the Sea of Love" on YouTube

"Drowning in the Sea of Love" is a 1971 song recorded by Joe Simon for Spring Records. It was the title track of his seventh LP, and was the first release from the album. The song was written by Kenny Gamble and Leon Huff.

== Chart performance ==
The single was Simon's fourth of eight U.S. Top 40 hits. In early 1972, it reached number 11 on the U.S. Billboard Hot 100, and number eight on the Cash Box Top 100. It also reached number three on the R&B chart and became a gold record. Billboard ranked "Drowning in the Sea of Love" as the No. 77 song for 1972. The song remained Simon's longest-running and highest-charting U.S. single until his 1975 hit, "Get Down, Get Down (Get on the Floor)."

=== Weekly charts ===
Chart (1971–1972)	Peak position
Canada RPM Top Singles	50
U.S. Billboard Hot 100	11
U.S. Billboard Hot Soul Singles	3
U.S. Cash Box Top 100	8

=== Year-end charts ===
Chart (1972)	Rank
U.S. Billboard Hot 100	77
U.S. Cash Box	75

== Notable cover versions ==
Beatles drummer Ringo Starr recorded a cover version for his 1977 album Ringo the 4th. A live Boz Scaggs' live performance of the song appears on the 1991 album The New York Rock and Soul Revue: Live at the Beacon.
