= Joe Simon (singer) =

American soul and R&B musician (1936–2021)

Background information
- Born: Joseph Simon; September 7, 1936; Simmesport, Louisiana, U.S.
- Died: December 13, 2021 (aged 85)
- Genres: Soul, R&B
- Occupations: Singer; record producer; songwriter; pastor
- Instruments: Vocals
- Years active: 1959–late 1990s
- Labels: Hush; Vee-Jay; Sound Stage 7; Spring

Joseph Simon (September 7, 1936 – December 13, 2021) was an American soul and R&B musician. He began as a gospel artist singing with the Golden West Singers in the Bay Area in California. A consistent presence on the US charts between 1964 and 1981, Simon charted 51 U.S. Pop and R&B chart hits between 1964 and 1981, including eight times in the US top forty, 38 times in the top 40 of the US R&B chart, with 13 chart hits in Canada. His biggest hits included three number one entries on the US Billboard R&B chart: "The Chokin' Kind" (1969), "Power of Love" (1972), and "Get Down, Get Down (Get on the Floor)" (1975). In 2021, he was one of the 60 nominees for the National Rhythm & Blues Hall of Fame.

== Career ==
Simon was born in Simmesport, Louisiana, United States. Similar to many other African American artists from the era, Simon began singing in his father's Baptist church. He pursued his vocal abilities full-time once the family moved to Richmond (near Oakland, California) in the late 1950s. There Simon joined the Golden West Gospel Singers and became influenced by Sam Cooke and Arthur Prysock. The group turned secular, recording "Little Island Girl" as the Golden Tones in 1959.

Hush Records label owners Gary and Carla Thompson urged Simon to record on his own, and in 1964 Simon scored a minor hit on the Chicago-based Vee-Jay label with "My Adorable One". Simon scored again in 1965 with "Let's Do It Over", reaching 13 on the Billboard R&B chart. However, Vee-Jay folded soon after the latter song's release, and Simon found himself traveling across the country singing.

In his Nashville phase Simon carried on for Sam Cooke with a will.

— Christgau's Record Guide: Rock Albums of the Seventies (1981)

During this time Simon caught the eye of Nashville, Tennessee, R&B disc jockey John Richbourg, who became Simon's manager/record producer and brought him to Monument Records' subsidiary label Sound Stage 7 in 1966. That year Simon released "Teenager's Prayer", which reached 11 on the Billboard R&B chart. Within the next two years, Simon released hits such as "(You Keep Me) Hanging On", "The Chokin' Kind" (Hot 100 number 13), "Farther on Down The Road", and "Yours Love". Written by Harlan Howard, "The Chokin' Kind" spent 12 weeks in the charts, sold one million copies by June 16, 1969, and won Simon the Grammy Award in 1970 for Best Male R&B Vocal Performance. In 1969 Simon's composition "My Special Prayer", which had been a minor US hit for himself and for Percy Sledge, went to number one on the Dutch Top 40 in Sledge's version, spending 32 weeks on that chart in two separate chart runs.

Under the encouragement of Richbourg, Simon moved to the Polydor distributed Spring Records label in 1970, which paired Simon with Kenny Gamble and Leon Huff. The team wrote Simon's number 3 R&B hit "Drowning in the Sea of Love" in 1971 and his number 1 R&B hit "Power of Love" in the summer of 1972. Both songs reached number 11 on the Hot 100. "Drowning in the Sea of Love" sold over 1.5 million copies, earning RIAA gold on January 6, 1972, while "Power of Love" became Simon's third million seller, earning RIAA gold on August 29, 1972.

In-between those two gold singles, Simon released "Pool of Bad Luck", and afterward came "Misty Blue" and "Trouble in My Home" b/w "I Found My Dad", followed in 1973 by "Step By Step" (his only UK success) and his writing/producing the theme tune for the film Cleopatra Jones, then "River", and in 1974 "Carry Me" and "The Best Time of My Life".

1975's "Get Down, Get Down (Get On The Floor)", produced by Spring's in-house producer, Raeford Gerald, gave Simon his third number 1 R&B hit and his only Hot 100 top 10 hit, at number 8). "Music in My Bones" and "I Need You, You Need Me" (both Top 10 R&B hits) followed in a similar vein, preceding a number of other smaller hits.

In the late 1970s/early 1980s, Simon decided to remove his tenor/bass-baritone voice from the secular music world and devote it and other parts of his life to Christianity. Simon began evangelical preaching in Flossmoor, Illinois. In 1983, he produced the album Lay My Burden Down for former Davis Sisters second lead Jackie Verdell. Simon briefly returned to secular music in 1985 for his Mr. Right album, though none of its singles charted. He went on to release a gospel album titled This Story Must Be Told in the late 1990s.

In 1999, Simon was inducted as a Pioneer Award honoree by the Rhythm and Blues Foundation. He died on December 13, 2021. Sources gave his age as 85, in contrast to sources during his lifetime that had indicated a later year of birth. Simon's wife Melanie informed the Journal of Gospel Music of his death: "Joe had been ill for some time and spent his final night at home with her, even talking about going back into the studio. He died of breathing problems in an ambulance on his way to hospital. His funeral took place on Wednesday, December 22, 2021 in Bolingbrook, Illinois at the Victory Cathedral Worship Center.

== Discography ==
=== Studio albums ===
Year	Album	Peak chart positions		Record label
Year	Album	US	US R&B	Record label
1966	Simon Pure Soul	—	—	Sound Stage 7
1968	No Sad Songs	—	22	Sound Stage 7
1968	Simon Sings	—	41	Sound Stage 7
1969	The Chokin' Kind	81	18	Sound Stage 7
1969	Joe Simon...Better Than Ever	192	—	Sound Stage 7
1971	The Sounds of Simon	153	9	Spring
1972	Drowning in the Sea of Love	71	11	Spring
1973	The Power of Joe Simon	97	15	Spring
1973	Simon Country	208	51	Spring
1974	Mood, Heart and Soul	—	44	Spring
1975	Get Down	129	10	Spring
1976	Today	—	35	Spring
1977	Easy to Love	—	56	Spring
1977	A Bad Case of Love	—	—	Spring
1979	Love Vibrations	—	34	Spring
1979	Happy Birthday, Baby	—	—	Spring
1981	Glad You Came My Way	—	49	Posse
1985	Mr. Right	—	—	Compleat
1988	Simon Preaches Prayer	—	—	Skull
1998	This Story Must Be Told	—	—	Ripete
"—" denotes releases that did not chart.

=== Compilation albums ===
Year	Album	Peak chart positions		Record label
Year	Album	US	US R&B	Record label
1969	Joe Simon	—	—	Buddah
1972	Joe Simon's Greatest Hits	—	20	Sound Stage 7
1972	The Best of Joe Simon	147	—	Sound Stage 7
1976	The World of Joe Simon	—	—	Sound Stage 7
1982	By Popular Demand...Joe Simon's Greatest Hits	—	—	Posse
1985	By Popular Demand Joe Simon's Greatest Hits Volume II	—	—	Posse
1997	Greatest Hits: The Spring Years 1970-1977	—	—	Southbound
1997	Music In My Bones: The Best of Joe Simon	—	—	Rhino
2004	Mr. Shout	—	—	Ace
2022	Nine Pound Steel: The Best of Joe Simon	—	—	Sunset Blvd.
"—" denotes releases that did not chart or were not released in that territory.

=== Singles ===
Year	Single	Peak chart positions				
Year	Single	US	US R&B	AUS	CAN	UK
1960	"It's a Miracle"	—	—	—	—	—
1961	"Call My Name"	—	—	—	—	—
1961	"The Pledge"	—	—	—	—	—
1961	"Troubles"	—	—	—	—	—
1962	"I Keep Remembering "	—	—	—	—	—
1963	"Just Like Yesterday"	—	—	—	—	—
1964	"My Adorable One" ^{[A]}	102	8	—	—	—
1965	"When I'm Gone"	—	—	—	—	—
1965	"Let's Do It Over"	—	13	—	—	—
1966	"A Teenager's Prayer "	66	11	—	72	—
1966	"Too Many Teardrops"	—	—	—	—	—
1967	"My Special Prayer"	87	17	—	—	—
1967	"Put Your Trust in Me (Depend on Me)"	129	47	—	—	—
1967	"Nine Pound Steel"	70	19	—	79	—
1968	"No Sad Songs"	49	22	—	—	—
1968	"(You Keep Me) Hangin' On"	25	11	—	48	—
1968	"Message from Maria"	75	31	—	83	—
1968	"I Worry About You"	98	—	—	—	—
1968	"Looking Back"	70	42	—	—	—
1969	"The Chokin' Kind"	13	1	—	17	—
1969	"Baby, Don't Be Looking in My Mind"	72	16	—	48	—
1969	"San Francisco Is a Lonely Town"	79	29	—	—	—
1969	"It's Hard to Get Along"	87	26	—	86	—
1969	"Moon Walk"	54	11	—	27	—
1970	"Farther on Down the Road"	56	7	—	66	—
1970	"Yours Love"	78	10	—	—	—
1970	"That's The Way I Want Our Love"	93	27	—	—	—
1970	"Your Time to Cry"	40	3	—	39	—
1971	"Help Me Make It Through the Night"	69	13	—	—	—
1971	"To Lay Down Beside You"	117	—	—	—	—
1971	"You're The One For Me"	71	12	—	—	—
1971	"All My Hard Times"	93	19	—	—	—
1971	"Georgia Blue"	—	19	—	—	—
1971	"Drowning in the Sea of Love"	11	3	95	50	—
1972	"Pool of Bad Luck"	42	13	—	—	—
1972	"Power of Love"	11	1	—	—	—
1972	"Misty Blue"	91	47	—	—	—
1972	"Trouble in My Home"	50	5	—	—	—
1972	"I Found My Dad"	78	15	—	—	—
1973	"Step by Step"	37	6	—	73	14
1973	"Theme From Cleopatra Jones"	18	3	—	—	—
1973	"River"	62	6	—	—	—
1974	"Carry Me"	—	12	—	—	—
1974	"Who's Julie"	—	—	—	—	—
1974	"The Best Time of My Life"	—	15	—	—	—
1974	"Someone to Lean On"	—	—	—	—	—
1975	"Get Down, Get Down (Get on the Floor)"	8	1	—	15	—
1975	"Music in My Bones"	92	7	—	—	—
1975	"I Need You, You Need Me"	—	5	—	98	—
1976	"Come Get to This"	102	22	—	—	—
1976	"Funny How Time Slips Away"	—	—	—	—	—
1976	"Easy to Love"	—	12	—	—	—
1977	"You Didn't Have to Play No Games"	—	62	—	—	—
1977	"One Step at a Time"	—	28	—	—	—
1977	"For Your Love, Love, Love"	—	27	—	—	—
1978	"I.O.U."	—	71	—	—	—
1978	"Love Vibration"	—	15	—	—	—
1979	"Going Through These Changes"	—	78	—	—	—
1979	"I Wanna Taste Your Love"	—	87	—	—	—
1980	"Hooked on Disco Music"	—	—	—	—	—
1980	"Baby, When Love Is in Your Heart (It's in Your Eyes)"	—	60	—	—	—
1980	"Glad You Came My Way"	—	43	—	—	—
1981	"Are We Breaking Up"	—	52	—	—	—
1981	"Magnolia"	—	—	—	—	—
1981	"You Give Life to Me" (With Clare Bathe)	—	—	—	—	—
1982	"Go Sam"	—	—	—	—	—
1982	"It's Be's That Way Sometime"	—	—	—	—	—
1985	"It Turns Me Inside Out"	—	—	—	—	—
1985	"Mr. Right or Mr. Right Now"	—	—	—	—	—
1988	"Lord It's True, I Do Love You"	—	—	—	—	—
1988	"The Lord's Prayer"	—	—	—	—	—
"—" denotes releases that did not chart or were not released in that territory.

- ^{A} From November 30, 1963, to January 23, 1965, Billboard Magazine did not publish a Hot R&B songs chart. The peak positions for R&B singles listed during this period are from Cash Box Magazine R&B songs chart.

== See also ==
- List of artists who reached number one on the Billboard R&B chart
- List of soul musicians
- Southern soul
- Country soul
- List of disco artists (F-K)
