= Help Me Make It Through the Night (Sammi Smith album) =

Studio album by Sammi Smith
- Released: September 1970
- Recorded: May 1970
- Studios: Monument Recording, Nashville, Tennessee
- Genres: Outlaw country, country pop
- Length: 33:01
- Label: Mega
- Producer: Jim Malloy

Sammi Smith chronology
Help Me Make It Through the Night (1970)	Lonesome (1971)

Singles from Help Me Make It Through the Night
- 1. "He's Everywhere" Released: July 1970; 2. "Help Me Make It Through the Night" Released: November 1970

Help Me Make It Through the Night is the debut studio album released by American country artist Sammi Smith. The album was originally released in September 1970 on Mega Records and was produced by Jim Malloy. The album was originally named He's Everywhere but was renamed Help Me Make It Through the Night due to the popularity of that track, which reached number one on the Billboard country music chart and the Top 10 on the Billboard Hot 100 chart. The album comprised Smith's first recordings for the Mega label.

== Background and content ==
Help Me Make It Through the Night was recorded in May 1970 at Monument Studios in Nashville, Tennessee, United States and included Smith's first recordings for Mega Records, after leaving the Columbia label in 1969. The album's style reflected the Outlaw Country sound, which was found in other artists such as Willie Nelson and Waylon Jennings. The album was originally titled He's Everywhere, due to the single of the same name becoming Smith's first Top 40 hit on the Billboard country chart. When the title track became a major hit, the album was retitled with the same album number. The album consisted of eleven tracks of new material. The release included a series of cover versions, such as Patsy Cline's "There He Goes", The First Edition's "But You Know I Love You", and Johnny Darrell's "With Pen in Hand". Two songs composed by Kris Kristofferson were also included: the Help Me Make It Through the Night and Johnny Cash's "Sunday Mornin' Comin' Down". The debut record also contained five new tracks ("Saunder's Ferry Lane", "He's Everywhere", "Don't Blow No Smoke on Me", "When Michael Calls", and "This Room for Rent").

The album was originally released on an LP record, with six songs on the first side of the record and five on the opposite side.

== Release ==
The lead single released from Smith's future album was the album's sixth track entitled "He's Everywhere" in July 1970. The single became Smith's first Top 40 and Top 30 single, reaching #25 on the Billboard Country music chart that year. In November 1970, "Help Me Make It Through the Night" was released and became Smith's biggest hit and signature song. It reached #1 on the Billboard Magazine Hot Country Singles chart, #8 on the Billboard Hot 100, and #3 on the Billboard Hot Adult Contemporary Tracks chart in 1971. In addition, "Help Me Make It Through the Night" also reached #1 on the RPM Country chart in Canada, as well as #4 on its Top Singles chart. For the song's success, Smith would later win the Country Music Association's "Single of the Year" award and the Grammy Award for Best Female Country Vocal Performance in 1972. The album was released in September 1970 on Mega Records and peaked at #1 on the Billboard Magazine Top Country Albums chart and #33 on the Billboard 200 albums list. It also went to #51 on the RPM Top Albums chart in Canada, Smith's only album to chart there.

== Track listing ==
Side one

1. "Saunder's Ferry Lane" – (Janette Tooley, Jean Whitehead) 3:04
2. "There He Goes" – (Durwood Haddock, Eddie Miller, W.S. Stevenson) 3:19
3. "With Pen in Hand" – (Bobby Goldsboro) 3:46
4. "Sunday Mornin' Comin' Down" – (Kris Kristofferson) 4:35
5. "Lonely Street" – (Carl Belew, Kenny Sowder, Stevenson) 2:45
6. "He's Everywhere" – (Gene Dobbins, Whitehead) 3:04

Side two

1. "Help Me Make It Through the Night" – (Kristofferson) 2:31
2. "But You Know I Love You" – (Mike Settle) 2:41
3. "Don't Blow No Smoke on Me" – (Dobbins, Whitehead) 2:02
4. "When Michael Calls" – (Tooley) 2:19
5. "This Room for Rent" – (Tooley) 2:55

== Personnel ==
- Byron Bach – strings
- Brenton Banks – strings
- George Binkley – strings
- David Briggs – piano
- Jerry Carrigan – drums
- Marvin Chantry – strings
- Albert Coleman – strings
- John Darnall – strings
- Lillian Hunt – strings
- Roy Huskey – bass
- Martin Katahn – strings
- Sheldon Kurland – strings
- Martha McCrory – strings
- Farrell Morris – percussion
- Weldon Myrick – steel guitar
- Bill Pursell – piano
- Billy Sanford – guitar
- Jerry Shook – guitar
- Sammi Smith – lead vocals
- David Vanderkool – strings
- Gary Vanosdale – strings
- Bill Walker – vibes
- Stephanie Woolf – strings
- Chip Young – guitar

== Chart positions ==
Album

Chart (1971)	Peak position
U.S. Billboard 200	33
U.S. Top Country Albums (Billboard)	1
Canadian RPM Top Albums	51

Singles

Year	Song	Peak chart positions				
Year	Song	US Country	US	US AC	CAN Country	CAN
1970	"He's Everywhere"	25	—	—	—	—
1970	"Help Me Make It Through the Night"	1	8	3	1	4
"—" denotes releases that did not chart
