= Looking at Me =

Looking at Me may refer to:

- "Looking at Me (J'aime regarder)", a 2009 song by Laurent Wéry & Sir-G
- "Lookin' at Me", a 1998 song by Mase
- "Looking at Me", a song by Sabrina Carpenter from the 2019 album Singular: Act II
