= Mixed Emotions =

Mixed Emotions may refer to:

== Music ==
=== Bands ===
- Mixed Emotions (band), a 1986–1992 German pop group
- The Mixed Emotions, a 1960s garage band that appears on the 1997 compilation album Essential Pebbles, Volume 1

=== Albums ===
- Mixed Emotions (Beverley Craven album), 1999
- Mixed Emotions (David Lynn Jones album), 1992
- Mixed Emotions (Exile album), 1978
- Mixed Emotions, by Bebe Barron, 2000
- Mixed Emotions, by Lil Tjay, 2019
- Mixed Emotions, by Sammi Smith, 1977
- Mixed Emotions, by Tanlines, 2012
- Mixed Emotions, an EP by Lauren Spencer-Smith, 2020

=== Songs ===
- "Mixed Emotions" (1951 song), written by Stuart F. Louchheim and recorded by Rosemary Clooney
- "Mixed Emotions" (Rolling Stones song), 1989
- "Mixed Emotions", by Ab-Soul from Control System, 2012
- "Mixed Emotions", by Abra Cadabra, 2021
- "Mixed Emotions", by Chase & Status, 2022
- "Mixed Emotions", by Ladyhawke from Time Flies, 2021
- "Mixed Emotions", by Lil Tjay from True 2 Myself, 2019

== Other uses ==
- Mixed Emotions, a 1993 play by Richard Baer
- Mixed Emotions, a 1977 novel by Charlotte Vale-Allen
