= Ride Like the Wind =

1980 single by Christopher Cross

- 1980 cover

Single by Christopher Cross

from the album Christopher Cross
- B-side: "Minstrel Gigolo"
- Released: January 30, 1980
- Recorded: 1979
- Genre: Soft rock
- Length: 4:32 (album version); 3:56 (single version)
- Label: Warner Bros.
- Songwriter: Christopher Cross
- Producer: Michael Omartian

Christopher Cross singles chronology
"Ride Like the Wind" (1980)	"Sailing" (1980)

"Ride Like the Wind" is the debut single by American singer-songwriter Christopher Cross. It was released by Warner Records in January 1980 as the lead single from his Grammy-winning 1979 debut album Christopher Cross. The song reached number 2 on the US Billboard pop chart for four consecutive weeks, behind "Call Me" by Blondie. On the album's inner sleeve, Christopher Cross dedicated this song to Lowell George of the band Little Feat who had died in 1979. It features backing vocals by Michael McDonald and a guitar solo by Cross.

== History ==
=== Recording ===
"Ride Like the Wind" was the first song recorded for Cross's debut album and was tracked by Cross's band of Tommy Taylor on drums, Andy Salmon on bass, and Rob Meurer on synthesizers. After the first day of recording, Cross's producer Michael Omartian noticed that the band had struggled to become accustomed to the studio. "They were great musicians, but a little nervous". During these recording sessions, someone recommended that Taylor play a four on the floor beat so that the kick drum was playing on every beat. Omartian commented that this drum pattern "made the thing hop from the beginning." After two to three days of tracking, the band introduced a satisfactory take. Cross had originally wanted a session guitarist to play the solo, but Omartian insisted that Cross play it himself.

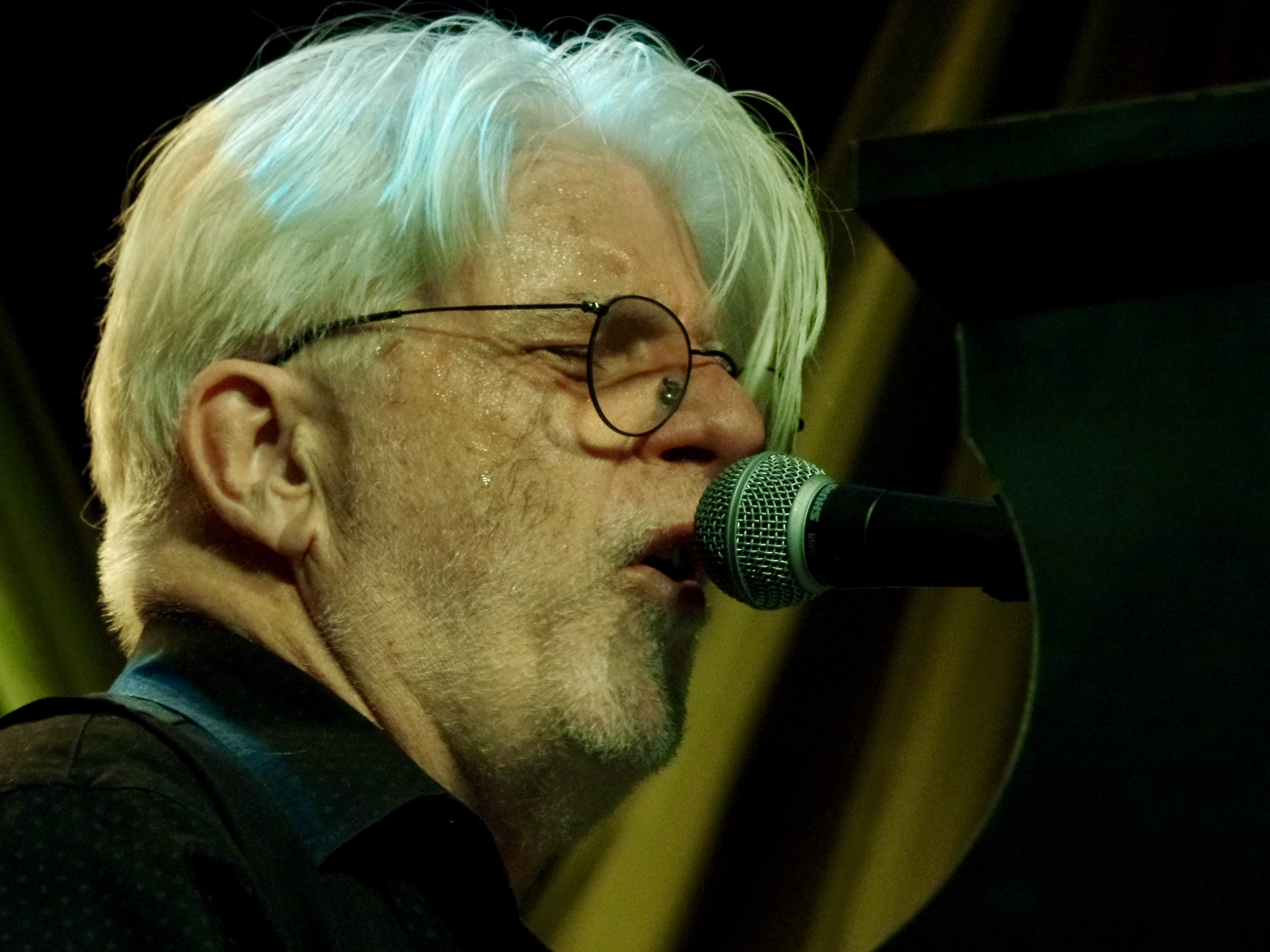
Michael McDonald (pictured in 2019) performed backing vocals on "Ride Like the Wind".

For the vocals, Omartian used an AKG 414 microphone. Cross did four to five vocal takes, all of which possessed similar intonation. "Chris's pitch [accuracy] was ridiculous, and he was very stylized, so when you went from one thing to another, he was the same. If there was an impulse to do something like a scat or some riff, he had thought about it, so every single track possessed that same riff." On the original demo, the response vocals were also sung by Cross, although Omartian suggested using a different voice, and ultimately settled on Michael McDonald.

Cross wanted Omartian to play on the record, so the latter overdubbed an acoustic piano and Fender Rhodes electric piano to fulfill this request. Soon after these parts were recorded, Lenny Castro came into the studio to play congas while Victor Feldman recorded additional percussion. A horn and 28-piece string section led by violinist Assa Dror was recorded. To finish "Ride Like the Wind", Cross and engineer Chet Himes decided to start the song with wind sound effects. "It could have ended up being dopey, but we didn't push the volume up on the sound effect to make it take over what was going on." Omartian recalled using a Harrison 48-channel board and two Ampex 1200 24-track machines to record the instruments and vocals.

=== Lyrics ===
The lyrics of the song tell the story of a condemned criminal on the run to Mexico. Told from a first-person point of view, it describes how an outlaw and convicted multiple murderer, on the run from a death-by-hanging sentence, has to "ride like the wind" to reach "the border of Mexico".

Cross was intoxicated on LSD when he wrote the lyrics. "We were living in Houston at the time, and on the way down to Austin to record the songs, it was just a beautiful Texas day. I took acid. So I wrote the words on the way down from Houston to Austin."

=== Tributes ===
In 1981, Canadian sketch comedy SCTV performed a sketch where Rick Moranis portrayed Michael McDonald racing to the studio to record his backing vocals for the song. McDonald later commented on seeing the sketch, "I remember thinking that guy really looks familiar, and it was Rick Moranis as me doing this, going into the studios and they’re playing Christopher’s song, and I thought I’m losing it, you know, that’s what’s happening? I’m having hallucinations, you know that stuff was stronger than I thought, you know, and then as it played out, I realized this is SCTV, and it’s a skit. Thank God for that."

In 1999, the satirical newspaper The Onion published a story with the headline, "Christopher Cross Finally Reaches Mexican Border"; the headline was a reference to the song, and the three-sentence story made several specific allusions to the lyrics. Cross appreciated the honor.

== Personnel ==
- Christopher Cross – lead and backing vocals, guitars
- Michael McDonald – backing vocals
- Andy Salmon – bass guitar
- Michael Omartian – piano, Fender Rhodes piano
- Rob Meurer – synthesizer
- Tommy Taylor – drums
- Lenny Castro – congas
- Victor Feldman – percussion
- Jim Horn – saxophone
- Jackie Kelso – saxophone
- Don Roberts – saxophone
- Lew McCreary – trombone
- Chuck Findley – trumpet
- Assa Dror – violin
- Uncredited string section

== Charts ==
=== Weekly charts ===
Chart (1980–1981)	Peak position
Australia (Kent Music Report)	25
Canada Top Singles (RPM)	3
New Zealand (Recorded Music NZ)	31
UK Singles (Official Charts)	69
US Billboard Hot 100	2
US Adult Contemporary (Billboard)	24

=== Year-end charts ===
Chart (1980)	Rank
Canada Top Singles (RPM)	21
US Billboard Hot 100	17

== Certifications ==
Region	Certification	Certified units/sales
New Zealand (RMNZ)	Platinum	30,000^{‡}
^{‡} Sales+streaming figures based on certification alone.

== East Side Beat version ==
"Ride Like the Wind"

Single by East Side Beat
- Released: November 18, 1991
- Length: 3:58 (Factory edit)
- Label: FFRR
- Songwriter: Christopher Cross
- Producers: Dave Seaman; Phil Kelsey

East Side Beat singles chronology
"Ride Like the Wind" (1991)	"Alive and Kicking" (1992)

In 1991, Italian dance music group East Side Beat covered "Ride Like the Wind" in a style typical of early 1990s dance music. There are five mixes in total. Two versions are found on the 7" single and an additional three are on the CD and US 12" single. The Factory Edit was included on FFRR Records' Only for the Headstrong compilation album released in 1992.

=== Formats and track listings ===
- 7-inch single
1. "Ride Like the Wind" (Factory edit) – 3:58
2. "Ride Like the Wind" (Subway mix) – 4:09
- CD single
1. "Ride Like the Wind" (Factory edit) – 3:58
2. "Ride Like the Wind" (Factory mix) – 5:51
3. "Ride Like the Wind" (piano version) – 5:32
4. "Ride Like the Wind" (Oceanic remix) – 5:22
5. "Ride Like the Wind" (Subway mix) – 4:00

=== Charts ===
==== Weekly charts ====
Chart (1991–1992)	Peak position
Australia (ARIA)	144
Austria (Ö3 Austria Top 40)	29
Belgium (Ultratop 50 Flanders)	4
Europe (Eurochart Hot 100)	8
Europe (European Dance Radio)	13
France (SNEP)	12
Germany (GfK)	24
Ireland (IRMA)	4
Luxembourg (Radio Luxembourg)	9
Netherlands (Dutch Top 40)	6
Netherlands (Single Top 100)	6
Portugal (AFP)	9
Spain (AFYVE)	4
Switzerland (Schweizer Hitparade)	23
UK Singles (Official Charts)	3
UK Airplay (Music Week)	17
UK Dance (Music Week)	2
UK Club Chart (Record Mirror)	4

==== Year-end charts ====
Chart (1991)	Position
UK Singles (OCC)	62
UK Club Chart (Record Mirror)	66

Chart (1992)	Position
Belgium (Ultratop 50 Flanders)	37
Netherlands (Dutch Top 40)	65
Netherlands (Single Top 100)	54

== Laurent Wéry version ==
"Ride Like the Wind"

Single by Laurent Wéry featuring Joss Mendosah
- Released: March 30, 2013
- Recorded: 2012
- Genre: Dance, house
- Length: 2:53
- Label: La Musique du Beau Monde
- Songwriter: Christopher Cross
- Producer: Laurent Wéry

Laurent Wéry singles chronology
"I'm Going In" (2012)	"Ride Like the Wind" (2013)	"Up 2 the Sky" (2013)

Belgian DJ Laurent Wéry released a cover version of the song, which features vocals from Joss Mendosah. The song was produced by Laurent Wery. It was released in Belgium as a digital download on March 30, 2013. The song peaked at number 26 in Belgium.

=== Music video ===
A music video to accompany the release of "Ride Like the Wind" was first released on YouTube on April 8, 2013, at a total length of two minutes and fifty-four seconds.

=== Track listing ===
Digital download
No.	Title	Length
1.	"Ride Like the Wind" (Original Extended) (featuring Joss Mendosah)	4:38
2.	"Ride Like the Wind" (Original Radio Mix) (featuring Joss Mendosah)	2:53

=== Charts ===
Chart (2013)	Peak position
Belgium (Ultratop 50 Flanders)	26

=== Release history ===
Region	Date	Format	Label
Belgium	March 30, 2013	Digital download	La Musique du Beau Monde
