= Jackie Verdell =

American gospel singer (1937–1991)

- Verdell, c. 1983

Background information
- Also known as: Jacqui Verdell
- Born: November 5, 1937; Philadelphia, Pennsylvania, United States
- Died: August 3, 1991 (aged 53)
- Genres: Gospel, soul
- Occupations: Singer, songwriter
- Instrument: Vocals
- Years active: 1955–1988
- Labels: Savoy Records, Peacock Records, Duke Records, RCA Records, Decca Records(US), Coral Records, Stax Records, Gospel Truth Records, Respect Records, Motown Records, Spring Records, Ace Records, Shanachie Records
- Formerly of: The Davis Sisters

Jackie Verdell (November 5, 1937 – August 3, 1991) was an American gospel singer, born in Philadelphia, Pennsylvania, United States.

== Musical career ==
After leaving high school, she joined The Davis Sisters in 1955, at the start of their tenure with Herman Lubinsky and Ozzie Cadena's record label Savoy Records of Newark, New Jersey. How she came to sing with one of gospel's famous groups is a typical Golden Age gospel tale. Raised in the Church of God in Christ, she was a soloist in the choir of Faith Temple in New York, pastored by Bishop A.A. Childs (the church would later serve as the site of Malcolm X's last rites). Ruth Davis was attending a broadcast at which Jackie was singing and the rest is gospel history. Jackie Verdell possessed a powerful mezzo-soprano voice, and her performances on records such as "Lord Don't Leave Me", "Following Him", and "I Don't Know What I'd Do" made an impression on the young Aretha Franklin, among others. "I also considered Jackie Verdell of the Davis Sisters one of the best and most underrated female soul singers of all time" said Franklin in her 1999 autobiography Aretha: From These Roots. "It was through Jackie that I learned the expression 'Girl, you peed tonight'--meaning you were dynamite. Several nights Jackie sang so hard she literally had a spot or two on her robe from peeing. Singing far too hard, I also peed here and there in the early days; I quickly realized no one should sing that hard." Verdell was second lead for The Davis Sisters between 1955 and 1960, featuring on many of their Savoy recordings.

Like Franklin, she left the gospel field in 1960 and began singing pop, her voice having deepened to a contralto and losing the upper register. Verdell signed with Houston-based Peacock Records, releasing three singles between 1961 and 1964. None of them charted, but her own composition, "Why Not Give Me A Chance", produced by Dinah Washington's former producer Clyde Otis, seems to have attained a small level of popularity, being covered in later years by soul singers O.V. Wright on Peacock's subsidiary Back Beat Records in the late 1960s, and by Ruby Wilson on Malaco Records in the early 1980s. The Davis Sisters' recording session information in Gospel Records 1943 – 1969 suggests that Verdell was absent from the group during 1960 and 1961, returned in 1962 for further recordings on Savoy, was absent again in 1963, and then returned again in 1964 for more recordings on Savoy and RCA Records, apparently departing for good around 1966. Some television appearances with The Davis Sisters and Brother Joe May which were posted to YouTube in 2006 and 2007, and appear to date from 1964. After several years of appearing with the Davis sisters, she relocated to Chicago, and worked closely with the Reverend Jesse Jackson and Operation Push as the featured soloist. She appeared in the film documentary Save The Children; Jesse Jackson's Operation PUSH exposition held in 1972 in Chicago. The film was released on September 18, 1973, by Paramount Pictures. She made her theatrical debut in the Alex Bradford play Black Nativity, and sang in the Broadway bound musical Don't Cry Mary. In 1979, she was nominated for a Grammy Award by the National Academy of Recording Arts and Science for her rendition of "Kum by ya". This was a high point in her career. When asked about this exciting event she replied: "Even if I don't win, it will be a thrill just to be there." In 1981, she once again recorded with The Davis Sisters, the last album by the group entitled "The Storm is Passing Over". The album featured Verdell, Audrey Davis, Alfreda Davis, and Michele White.

After further unsuccessful pop singles on Decca Records (US) and its Coral Records subsidiary, the late 1960s and early 1970s found Verdell contributing background vocals (along with Cissy Houston, Judy Clay, and other members of The Drinkard Singers or The Sweet Inspirations) to records by Wilson Pickett (Cole, Cooke & Redding), Dee Dee Warwick (Turning Around), Van Morrison (Moondance), Clarence Wheeler & The Enforcers, Horace Silver, and Martha Veléz, as well as a further solo single for Stax Records' Gospel Truth and Respect labels under the name of Jacqui Verdell. Her only solo album, Lay My Burden Down, produced by former soul singer Joe Simon, and including Houston & Warwick on background vocals, was released on Spring Records in 1983, and on CD by Ace Records (UK) in 1993. Viv Broughton's 1985 book Black Gospel: An Illustrated History of the Gospel Sound stated: "Whereas Aretha Franklin lives in fabulous, if troubled, luxury - Jackie Verdell, who made the same move at the same time made nothing at all and is now back singing gospel to a faintly suspicious audience" (paperback edition, page 107). She once complained to gospel maven Anthony Heilbut: "I'd like to be an evangelist, but these crooked promoters won't pay my money." In 1988, she sang in the choir on the Carman album Live: Radically Saved. Due to failing health, she was unable to continue her career.

Verdell died in August 1991, at the age of 53.

== Discography ==
- "You Ought to Know Him"/"Bye Bye Blackbird" (Peacock 45 1905, 1961)
- "Why Not Give Me A Chance"/"Hush" (Peacock 45 1921, 1962)
- "YKW"/"Come Let Me Love You" (Peacock 45 1930, 1964)
- "Are You Ready for This"/"I'm Your Girl" (Decca 45 32118, 1967)
- "Does She Ever Remind You Of Me"/"Don't Set Me Free" (Decca 45 32181, 1967)
- "Call On Me"/"If We Are Really In Love" (Coral 45 62555, 1968)
- Blues That Gave America Soul (Duke LP 82, 1960's) - includes "Why Not Give Me A Chance"
- "He's Mine"/"We're Gonna Have A Good Time" (Respect 45 2505,1974)(as by Jacqui Verdell, originally issued on the Gospel Truth label)
- Save The Children (Motown LP 800, 1974) - includes "I'm Too Close To Heaven To Turn Around" (with Rev. Jesse Jackson & the PUSH Expo Choir)
- "Lay My Burden Down" (vocal)/(instrumental) (Lection/Spring 45 3004, 1982)
- Lay My Burden Down (Spring LP 6739, 1983; Ace (UK) CD 375, 1993)
- The Complete Stax/Volt Soul Singles Volume 3, 1972-1975 (Stax CD 4415, 1994) - includes "He's Mine"
- The Soul Of Spring (Kent CD 151, 1999) - includes "Can I Get A Witness"
- When Gospel Was Gospel (Shanachie CD 6064, 2005) - includes "You're Gonna Need Him" (with Brother Joe May)
- The Soul Of Spring, Volume 2 (Kent CD 268, 2007) - includes "Walk All Over God's Heaven"
- Carman: Live: Radically Saved (Sparrow/Capitol 51349; Benson 2463, 1988)(member of choir)
- The Davis Sisters: The Famous Davis Sisters (Savoy LP 14000, c. 1955)(JV lead vocals on "He's My King", "Lord, Don't Leave Me", "Oh Happy Day")
- The Davis Sisters: Jesus Gave Me Water (Savoy LP 14036, c. 1959) (JV lead or co-lead vocals on "We Need Power", "I'm Going Home", "He's Alright", "Save Me", "Jesus Gave Me Water", "Bye And Bye", "Trees")
- The Davis Sisters: The Davis Sisters Sing Authentic Southern Style Gospel (RCA Victor LP LPM/LSP 2851, 1964) (Recorded live in Little Rock, AR. JV lead or co-lead vocals on "The Man Is Alright", "Life's Evening Sun", "I'm On the Right Road Now")
- The Davis Sisters: The Best of the Davis Sisters (Savoy LP/CD 7017, 1978/2001) (JV lead or co-lead vocals on "He's My King", "Plant My Feet On Higher Ground", "Sinner Man Where You Gonna Run To", "I Want To Be More Like Jesus", "When I Get Inside", "My Wonderful Counselor", "Jonah", "What He's Done For Me", "We Need Power", "Jesus Gave Me Water", "Bye And Bye", "He's My Precious King". Sang in group on several other tracks.)
- Morrison, Van: Moondance (Warner Bros. LP/CD 3103)(background vocals)
- Pickett, Wilson: Wilson Pickett's Greatest Hits (Atlantic CD 81737, 1989)(background vocals)
- Pickett, Wilson: A Man And A Half (Rhino/Atlantic CD 70287, 1992) (background vocals on "Cole, Cooke & Redding")
- Silver, Horace: The United States Of Mind (Blue Note CD 73157) (vocals)
- Veléz, Martha: Hypnotized (Polydor LP 5034, 1972) (background vocals)
- Warwick, Dee Dee: Turning Around (Atco LP 33-337, 1970)(background vocals)
- Warwick, Dee Dee: She Didn't Know - The Atco Sessions (Ichiban Soul Classics CD 2111, 1996)(background vocals)
- Wheeler, Clarence, & The Enforcers: Doin' What We Wanna (Atlantic LP/CD 648727) (background vocals)
