= Hangin' On (album) =

Studio album by Waylon Jennings
- Released: February 1968
- Studio: RCA Studio A (Nashville, Tennessee)
- Genre: Country
- Length: 29:30
- Label: RCA Victor
- Producer: Chet Atkins

Waylon Jennings chronology
The One and Only (1967)	Hangin' On (1968)	Only the Greatest (1968)

Singles from Hangin' On
- 1. "The Chokin' Kind" Released: July 14, 1967

Professional ratings
Review scores
Source	Rating
Allmusic	4/5 stars

Hangin' On is the eighth studio album by American country music artist Waylon Jennings, released in 1968 on RCA Victor. It was both a critical and commercial success.

== Chart performance ==
The album debuted on the Billboard Top Country LP's chart in the issue dated March 2, 1968, peaking at number 9 during a ten-week run on it.

== Track listing ==
No.	Title	Writer(s)	Length
1.	"Hangin' On"	Ira Allen, Buddy Mize	2:19
2.	"Julie"	Waylon Jennings	2:24
3.	"The Crowd"	Roy Orbison, Joe Melson	2:36
4.	"Let Me Talk to You"	Danny Dill, Don Davis	2:12
5.	"Woman, Don't You Ever Laugh at Me"	Bobby Bare	2:22
6.	"The Chokin' Kind"	Harlan Howard	2:27
7.	"Gentle on My Mind"	John Hartford	3:07
8.	"Right Before My Eyes"	Don Bowman, Jennings	2:02
9.	"Lock, Stock and Teardrops"	Roger Miller	2:49
10.	"I Fall in Love So Easily"	Glenn Martin, Billy Swan	2:08
11.	"Looking at a Heart That Needs a Home"	Howard	2:27
12.	"How Long Have You Been There"	Dee Moeller	2:37

- Tracks 4, 5, 6, 9, 10 credited to Waylon Jennings and the Waylors
