= Salva Mea (Laurent Wéry song) =

Single by Laurent Wéry
- Released: 3 January 2011
- Recorded: 2010
- Genre: Dance
- Length: 3:09
- Label: LMDBM
- Songwriter(s): Maxi Jazz, Ayalah Bentovim, Roland Armstrong
- Producer(s): Laurent Wery, Sir-G

Laurent Wéry singles chronology
"Ready for the Night" (2010)	"Salva Mea" (2011)	"Hey Hey Hey (Pop Another Bottle)" (2011)

"Salva Mea" is a song by Belgian DJ Laurent Wéry. The song was written by Maxi Jazz, Ayalah Bentovim, Roland Armstrong and Laurent Wery, Sir-G. It was released in Belgium as a digital download on 3 January 2011.

== Music video ==
A music video to accompany the release of "Salva Mea" was first released onto YouTube on 12 January 2011 at a total length of three minutes and ten seconds.

== Track listing ==
Digital download

1. "Salva Mea" (Radio Edit) - 3:09
2. "Salva Mea" (Extended Mix) - 7:22

== Credits and personnel ==
- Producers – Laurent Wery, Sir-G
- Lyrics – Maxi Jazz, Ayalah Bentovim, Roland Armstrong
- Label: LMDBM

== Chart performance ==
Chart (2011)	Peak position
Belgium (Ultratop 50 Flanders)	27

== Release history ==
Region	Date	Format	Label
Belgium	3 January 2011	Digital Download	LMDBM
