= The One and Only (Waylon Jennings album) =

The One and Only Waylon Jennings

Studio album by Waylon Jennings
- Released: November 1967
- Genre: Country
- Label: RCA Camden
- Producer: Chet Atkins

Waylon Jennings chronology
Love of the Common People (1967)	The One and Only Waylon Jennings (1967)	Hangin' On (1968)

The One and Only Waylon Jennings is the seventh studio album by American country music artist Waylon Jennings, released in 1967 on RCA Camden. It peaked at number 19 on the Billboard Hot Country LP's chart.

== Background ==
"John's Back in Town" is a comic response to Johnny Cash's "The Singing Star's Queen" from Everybody Loves a Nut (1966), with an identical general concept. During this time, Jennings rented an apartment in Nashville with Cash, who later recalled in the Jennings documentary Renegade Outlaw Rebel, "We had a mutual respect for each other as artists, and when we got to know each other we had so much in common: our love for music and, at that time, our love for chemicals." During the 1970s, RCA Records leased several recordings issued on the RCA Camden label to Pickwick Records; Pickwick reissued this album in 1976 as The Dark Side of Fame, without "It's All Over Now," which had been previously recorded by the Rolling Stones. The album also includes the popular Roy Orbison hit "Dream Baby." Matt Fink of AllMusic: "Though there's nothing here in particular to get excited about, there's enough to keep the casual fan interested."

Professional ratings
Review scores
Source	Rating
Allmusic	link

== Track listing ==
No.	Title	Writer(s)	Length
1.	"Yes, Virginia"	Liz Anderson	2:34
2.	"Dream Baby (How Long Must I Dream)"	Cindy Walker	2:29
3.	"You Beat All I Ever Saw"	Johnny Cash	2:21
4.	"She Loves Me (She Don't Love You)"	Conway Twitty	2:22
5.	"It's All Over Now"	Bobby Womack, Shirley Jean Womack	2:16
6.	"Born to Love You"	Woody Starr	2:34
7.	"Down Came the World"	Bozo Darnell, Waylon Jennings	2:19
8.	"The Dark Side of Fame"	Ted Harris	2:35
9.	"John's Back in Town"	Waylon Jennings, Bill Mack	2:03
10.	"Listen, They're Playing My Song"	Charlie Williams, Glen Garrison	2:50
