= Clarence Bekker =

Dutch electronic music vocalist

Clarence Bekker (aka CB Milton)
- Born: Clarence Bekker Milton; 11 April 1968 (age 58); Suriname
- Occupation: Singer
- Years active: 1993–present

Clarence Bekker (née Clarence Becker Milton; born 11 April 1968, formerly known as CB Milton), is a Surinamese and Dutch vocalist, who became known in the early 1990s with the singles "It's a Loving Thing", "Send Me an Angel" and "Open Your Heart". He was born in Suriname. "It's a Loving Thing" reached No. 34 in the UK Singles Chart in a remixed version in March 1995, and "Hold On (If You Believe in Love)" peaked at No. 62 in August that year. He also recorded three albums, It's My Loving Thing (1994), The Way to Wonderland (1996) and From Here to There (1998) for the Byte Records label in Antwerp, Belgium.

He later moved to Barcelona and was identified as Clarence Bekker of the Netherlands on the disc and DVD created by Playing for Change released in April 2009. He participated with various other artists on the songs "Stand by Me" (Ben E. King) and "Don't Worry" (Pierre Minetti) on the album. He is also part of the Playing for Change band, brought together to promote the disc.

Clarence Bekker's vocals have been influenced by a mix of soul, funk, and R&B traditions, shaped by his early career and collaborations. He began his singing journey with the long-running Dutch band Swinging Soul Machine, where he was the youngest singer in 20 years. This experience likely exposed him to classic soul and funk influences, which are evident in his powerful and soulful delivery.

In 2016, he formed his own band alongside prominent musicians from Barcelona. Since then, the Clarence Bekker Band has appeared at numerous festivals and venues across Europe, North and South America, Northern Africa, and Australia.

In early 2020, they released their first full-length album, “Changes,” under the JazzActivist label. This was followed in 2024 by a live album recorded at Barcelona's Jamboree club. In 2026, they released the single Natural.

== Discography ==
=== Singles ===
Year	Single	Chart Position					Album
Year	Single	NET^{Single T100}	BE^{Ultratop 100}	SPA	SWE	UK	Album
1993	"Send Me An Angel"	10	17	–	–	–	It's My Loving Thing
1993	"No One Else"	46	41	–	–	–	It's My Loving Thing
1994	"It's a Loving Thing"	16	3	–	33	49	It's My Loving Thing
1994	"Hold On (If You Believe in Love)"	35	15	–	–	62	It's My Loving Thing
1994	"Open Your Heart"	42	30	–	–	–	It's My Loving Thing
1995	"It's a Loving Thing (Remix)"	–	–	–	–	34	It's My Loving Thing
1995	"A Real Love"	47	34	–	–	–	The Way To Wonderland
1996	"Show Me The Way"	–	39	–	–	–	The Way To Wonderland
1996	"How Do I Know"	–	–	–	–	–	The Way To Wonderland
1996	"If You Leave Me Now"	–	44	–	–	–	The Way To Wonderland
1997	"Time Is Up"	–	–	–	–	–	The Way To Wonderland
1998	"Get into My Life"	88	39	–	–	–	From Here To There
1998	"What About Me"	–	37	–	–	–	From Here To There
1998	"We Are The One"	–	–	–	–	–	From Here To There
1998	"Carry On"	90	–	–	–	–	From Here To There
2020	"These Ladies"	–	–	–	–	–	Changes
2026	"Natural"	–	–	–	–	–	

=== Collaborations ===
Year	Single	Chart Position				
Year	Single	NET^{Single T100}	BE^{Ultratop 100}	SPA	SWE	UK
2001	"Something Going On" Mark Van Dale feat. CB Milton	65	–	–	–	–
2007	"Miracle Of Love" Tikaro & Selva feat. Clarence	–	–	7	–	–
2007	"Shine On Me" Tikaro, J.Louis & Ferran feat. Clarence	–	–	3	–	–
2008	"Shine On Me (Remixes)" Tikaro, J.Louis & Ferran feat. Clarence	–	–	8	–	–
2011	"Loving Thing" Phil Wilde feat. CB Milton	–	–	–	–	–
2012	"I'm Going In" Laurent Wery feat. Clarence	–	61	–	–	–

=== Albums ===
Title	Album details	Peak chart positions		
Title	Album details	NDL	SWE	UK
It's My Loving Thing	Released: 1994; Label: Byte Records; Formats: CD	77	–	–
The Way To Wonderland	Released: 1996; Label: Byte Records; Formats: CD	–	–	–
From Here To There	Released: 1998; Label: Byte Records; Formats: CD	–	–	–
Old Soul (as Clarence Milton Bekker)	Released: 2012; Label: Playing for Change Records; Formats: CD	–	–	–
Changes (as Clarence Bekker Band)	Released: 2020; Label: JazzActivist; Formats: CD	–	–	–
Live at Jamboree (as Clarence Bekker Band)	Released: 2024; Label: JazzActivist; Formats: CD	–	–	–
