= The Chokin' Kind =

1967 single by Waylon Jennings

Single by Waylon Jennings

from the album Hangin' On
- B-side: "Love of the Common People"
- Released: July 1967
- Genre: Country
- Length: 2:27
- Label: RCA Victor
- Songwriter: Harlan Howard
- Producer: Chet Atkins

Waylon Jennings singles chronology
"Mental Revenge" (1967)	"The Chokin' Kind" (1967)	"Walk Out of My Mind" (1967)

"The Chokin' Kind" is a song written by songwriter Harlan Howard. Country music artist Waylon Jennings recorded the original version and released it as a single in 1967. It peaked at number 8 on the US Hot Country Singles chart. Jennings featured the track on his 1967 album Hangin' On. R&B artist Joe Simon covered the song in 1969, earning a Grammy Award. It became an RIAA certified Gold single on June 16, 1969.

== Covers ==
=== Joe Simon ===
"The Chokin' Kind"

Single by Joe Simon

from the album The Chokin' Kind
- B-side: "Come On and Get It"
- Released: 1969
- Genre: R&B
- Length: 2:39
- Label: Sound Stage 7
- Songwriter: Harlan Howard
- Producer: J.R. Enterprises Inc

Joe Simon singles chronology
"Looking Back" (1968)	"The Chokin' Kind" (1969)	"Baby, Don't Be Looking in My Mind" (1969)

The song was recorded by Joe Simon in 1969 and was his first number 1 on the US R&B chart, where it stayed for three weeks. "The Chokin' Kind" was also Joe Simon's first Top 20 entry on the pop singles chart. Simon received the 1970 Grammy Award for Best R&B Vocal Performance, Male for this song.

==== Charts ====
Chart (1969)	Peak position
U.S. Billboard Hot 100	13
U.S. Billboard Hot Rhythm & Blues Singles	1
Can. RPM 100 RPM Magazine	17
