= Laurent Wéry =

Belgian DJ and record producer

- Born: 1975 (age 50–51)
- Origin: Aalst, East Flanders, Belgium
- Genres: Dance, house
- Occupations: Disc jockey, record producer
- Years active: 2005–present
- Website: laurentwery.be

Laurent Wéry (French pronunciation: [lɔʁɑ̃ veʁi]; born 1975 in Aalst) is a Belgian DJ and producer. He released his debut album Ready for the Night in Belgium on 19 July 2010. He became more popular with his single "Hey Hey Hey (Pop Another Bottle)" which features vocals from Swift K.I.D. & Dev.

== Music career ==
=== 2009–2010: Ready for the Night ===
Laurent Wéry released his first solo single "My Sound" on 14 February 2009 on La Musique du Beau Monde. The song reached number 20 in the official Belgian singleschart Ultratop. "Looking At Me (J'aime regarder)" was released on 8 July 2009 as his second single. "On the Dancefloor" was released as the third single on 11 September 2009. "Nagasaki" was released on 16 November 2009 as the fourth single. "Get Down" was released as the fifth single on 1 March 2010. His debut album Ready for the Night was released on 19 July 2010, only charting at number 95 in Belgium. The sixth and final single from the album "Ready for the Night" was released on 22 July 2010.

=== 2011–present: Second album ===
On 3 January 2011 Laurent released "Salva Mea" as the lead single from his upcoming second studio album. "Hey Hey Hey (Pop Another Bottle)" was released on 26 September 2011 as the second single from the album featuring vocals from Swift K.I.D. and Dev, the song peaked to number 16 in Belgium, it also charted at number 47 on the Irish Singles Chart, 2 on the Australian Singles Chart and number 14 on the US Billboard Hot Dance Club Songs chart.

== Discography ==
=== Albums ===
Title	Album details	Peak chart positions
Title	Album details	BEL (Vl)
Ready for the Night	Released: 19 July 2010; Label: La Musique du Beau Monde; Formats: CD, digital download	95

=== Singles ===
Year	Single	Peak chart positions						Album
Year	Single	BEL (Vl)	BEL (Wa)	AUS	IRE	NZ	US Dance	Album
2009	"My Sound"	20	39	—	—	—	—	Ready for the Night
2009	"Looking At Me (J'aime regarder)" (vs. Sir-G)	45	—	—	—	—	—	Ready for the Night
2009	"On the Dancefloor"	—	—	—	—	—	—	Ready for the Night
2009	"Nagasaki"	—	—	—	—	—	—	Ready for the Night
2010	"Get Down"	44	—	—	—	—	—	Ready for the Night
2010	"Ready for the Night"	— (Note: "Ready for the Night" did not enter the Ultratop 50, but peaked at number 23 on the Flemish Ultratip chart.)	—	—	—	—	—	Ready for the Night
2011	"Salva Mea"	27	—	—	—	—	—	Non-album singles
2011	"Hey Hey Hey (Pop Another Bottle)" (feat. Swift K.I.D. & Dev)	16	36	2	47	29	14	Non-album singles
2012	"I'm Going In"	— (Note: "I'm Going In" did not enter the Ultratop 50, but peaked at number 61 on the Flemish Ultratip chart.)	—	—	—	—	—	Non-album singles
2013	"Ride Like the Wind" (feat. Joss Mendosah)	26	—	—	—	—	—	Non-album singles
2013	"Up 2 The Sky" (feat. Mr. Shammi)	41	—	—	—	—	—	Non-album singles
2014	"To Brazil"	33	—	—	—	—	—	Non-album singles
2014	"See the Light" (feat. Sean Declase)	45	—	—	—	—	—	Non-album singles
"—" denotes single that did not chart or was not released.
