= Love of the Common People (Waylon Jennings album) =

Studio album by Waylon Jennings
- Released: August 1967
- Genre: Country
- Label: RCA Victor
- Producer: Chet Atkins

Waylon Jennings chronology
Waylon Sings Ol' Harlan (1967)	Love of the Common People (1967)	The One and Only (1967)

Professional ratings
Review scores
Source	Rating
Allmusic	4/5 stars

Love of the Common People is the sixth studio album by American country music artist Waylon Jennings, released on RCA Victor in 1967. It was both a critical and commercial success.

== Reception ==
Stephen Thomas Erlewine on AllMusic believed that "There's a certain tendency for country albums of this era to be uneven, and if that's the case on Love of the Common People, it isn't because of bad material but because Jennings is searching the entire time, testing things out, finding that some things work and others don't." He concluded that "It may not be a perfect album, but there are enough remarkable moments to make it nearly essential."

The album debuted on the Billboard Hot Country LP's chart in the issue dated August 26, 1967, peaking at number 3 during a twenty-four-week run on it.

== Track listing ==
No.	Title	Writer(s)	Length
1.	"Money Cannot Make the Man"	Jim Glaser	2:50
2.	"Young Widow Brown"	Waylon Jennings, Sky Corbin	2:09
3.	"You've Got to Hide Your Love Away"	John Lennon, Paul McCartney	2:20
4.	"Love of the Common People"	Ronnie Wilkins, John Hurley	2:54
5.	"I Tremble for You"	Johnny Cash, Lew DeWitt	2:16
6.	"Destiny's Child"	Sonny Curtis	2:06
7.	"Ruby, Don't Take Your Love to Town"	Mel Tillis	2:13
8.	"The Road"	Ted Harris	2:51
9.	"If the Shoe Fits"	Harlan Howard, Freddie Hart	2:17
10.	"Don't Waste Your Time"	Marty Taylor	2:16
11.	"Taos, New Mexico"	Bob Ferguson	2:21
12.	"Two Streaks of Steel"	Ben Peters	2:16

=== Bonus tracks on CD release ===
1. "The Chokin' Kind" (Harlan Howard) – 2:27
2. "Walk On Out of My Mind" (Red Lane) – 2:18
