= The Best of The Davis Sisters =

The Best of the Davis Sisters

Greatest hits album by The Davis Sisters
- Released: 1978
- Recorded: 1955–1968
- Genre: Gospel
- Length: 76:03
- Label: Savoy Records # 7017

The Best of the Davis Sisters is a double LP/single CD album by the famous Philadelphia gospel group, released in 1978 on LP (see 1978 in music) and in 2001 on CD (see 2001 in music). It collects 24 of their recordings made for Savoy Records between 1955 and 1968. Popular tracks are “Twelve Gates to the City”, “Sinner Man Where You Gonna Run To”, “Blessed Quietness”, “We Need Power”, “He’ll Understand and Say Well Done”. The lead vocals are shared between contralto Ruth “Baby Sis” Davis, mezzo-soprano Jackie Verdell, and occasionally pianist Curtis Dublin.

== Song History ==
- Recorded 9 February 1955: “Twelve Gates to the City”, “You’ve Got the River of Jordan to Cross”, “He’ll Understand and Say Well Done”, “He’s My King”
- Recorded 9 August 1955: “Won’t It Be Wonderful There”, “Rain In Jerusalem”
- Recorded 17 April 1956: “Plant My Feet on Higher Ground”, “Keeping Me Alive”
- Recorded 25 January 1957: “Sinner Man Where You Gonna Run To”, “Shine on Me”
- Recorded 29 May 1957: “There Is a Tree on Each Side of the River”, “When I Get Inside”
- Recorded 23 August 1957: “My Wonderful Counselor”
- Recorded 21 January 1958” “Jonah”, What He’s Done for Me”, “Almost Home”
- Recorded 17 June 1959: “We Need Power”, “Jesus Gave Me Water”
- Recorded 2 July 1959: “Bye and Bye”
- Recorded 16 May 1962: “He’s My Precious King”
- Recorded 23 May 1962: “Tired”
- Recorded c. 1967: “I Believe I’ll Go Back Home”
- Recorded c. 1968: “Blessed Quietness”

== Track listing ==
=== Side one ===
1. "Twelve Gates to the City" – 2:50
2. "Sinner Man Where You Gonna Run To" – 2:45
3. "I Want to Be More Like Jesus" – 2:25
4. "You Got the River of Jordan to Cross" – 2:40
5. "When I Get Inside" – 2:50
6. "Shine on Me" – 5:27

=== Side two ===
1. "Plant My Feet on Higher Ground" – 2:30
2. "He’s My King" – 3:15
3. "Rain in Jerusalem" – 2:35
4. "Blessed Quietness" – 2:43
5. "What He’s Done for Me" – 2:15
6. "Jonah" – 1:55

=== Side three ===
1. "(Jesus) He’s My Precious King" – 5:06
2. "We Need Power" – 2:40
3. "Tired" – 3:10
4. "Bye and Bye" – 5:20
5. "Jesus Gave Me Water" – 3:21
6. "I Believe I’ll Go Back Home" – 2:50

=== Side four ===
1. "He’ll Understand and Say Well Done" – 3:15
2. "There Is a Tree on Each Side of the River" – 3:00
3. "Keeping Me Alive" – 2:45
4. "My Wonderful Counselor" – 2:45
5. "Won’t It Be Wonderful There" – 2:55
6. "Almost Home" – 2:40

== Personnel ==
- Ruth Davis – lead vocals, background vocals
- Jackie Verdell – lead vocals, background vocals
- Curtis Dublin – lead vocals, piano
- Thelma Davis – background vocals
- Alfreda Davis – background vocals
- Audrey Davis – background vocals
- Cynthia Young – background vocals
- Lela Dargan – background vocals
- unknown – guitar
- unknown - bass
- unknown - organ
- unknown - percussion, drums

== Production ==
- Producer: not credited, but probably Ozzie Cadena
- Executive Producer: Fred Mendelson
- Recording location(s): Newark, New Jersey and/or New York City, New York
- Engineers: uncertain, possibly including Rudy Van Gelder
