= My Sound =

Single by Laurent Wéry

from the album Ready for the Night
- Released: 14 February 2009
- Recorded: 2008/2009
- Genre: Dance
- Length: 3:29
- Label: La Musique du Beau Monde
- Songwriter(s): Serge Ramaekers, Laurent Wery
- Producer(s): Serge Ramaekers, Laurent Wery

Laurent Wéry singles chronology
"My Sound" (2009)	"Looking at Me (J'aime regarder)" (2009)

"My Sound" is the debut single by Belgian DJ Laurent Wéry, from his debut album Ready for the Night. The song was written by Serge Ramaekers and Laurent Wery. It was released in Belgium as a digital download on 14 February 2009.

== Track listing ==
Digital download

1. "My Sound" (Radio Mix) - 3:29
2. "My Sound" (Club Mix) - %:29
3. "My Sound" (Natural Born Grooves - 5:35
4. "Eleven" (Creamminals Radio Mix) - 3:50
5. "Eleven" (Monster A Capella) - 2:21

== Credits and personnel ==
- Producers – Serge Ramaekers, Laurent Wery
- Lyrics – Serge Ramaekers, Laurent Wery
- Label: La Musique du Beau Monde

== Chart performance ==
Chart (2009)	Peak position
Belgium (Ultratop 50 Flanders)	20
Belgium (Ultratop 50 Wallonia)	39

== Release history ==
Region	Date	Format	Label
Belgium	14 February 2009	Digital Download	La Musique du Beau Monde
