= I'm Going In =

Single by Laurent Wéry featuring Clarence
- Released: 23 July 2012
- Recorded: 2012
- Genre: Dance; electronic
- Length: 3:22
- Label: La Musique du Beau Monde
- Songwriter(s): Phil Wilde, Laurent Wery, Bernard Ansong
- Producer(s): Phil Wilde, Laurent Wery

Laurent Wéry singles chronology
"Hey Hey Hey (Pop Another Bottle)" (2011)	"I'm Going In" (2012)	"Ride Like the Wind" (2013)

"I'm Going In" is a song by Belgian DJ Laurent Wéry, featuring vocals by Clarence. Written by Phil Wilde, Laurent Wéry and Bernard Ansong, the song was released in Belgium as a digital download on 23 July 2012.

== Track listing ==
Digital download

1. "I'm Going In" (Phil Wilde Radio Edit) – 3:22
2. "I'm Going In" (Phil Wilde Extended Mix) – 6:03
3. "I'm Going In" (Phil Wilde Club Mix) – 6:03

== Credits and personnel ==
- Lead vocals – Clarence
- Producers – Phil Wilde, Laurent Wery
- Lyrics – Phil Wilde, Laurent Wery, Bernard Ansong
- Label: La Musique du Beau Monde

== Chart performance ==
Chart (2012)	Peak position
Belgium (Ultratip Bubbling Under Flanders)	61

== Release history ==
Region	Date	Format	Label
Belgium	23 July 2012	Digital download	La Musique du Beau Monde
