= Up 2 the Sky =

Single by Laurent Wéry featuring Mr. Shammi
- Released: June 1, 2013
- Genre: Dance
- Length: 3:03
- Label: La Musique du Beau Monde
- Songwriter(s): Laurent Wéry, Krishna Salickram
- Producer(s): Laurent Wéry

Laurent Wéry singles chronology
"Ride Like the Wind" (2013)	"Up 2 the Sky" (2013)	"To Brazil" (2014)

"Up 2 the Sky" is a song by Belgian DJ Laurent Wéry, featuring vocals from Mr. Shammi. The song was written by Laurent Wery and Krishna Salickram. It was released in Belgium as a digital download on June 1, 2013.

== Music video ==
A music video to accompany the release of "Up 2 the Sky" was first released onto YouTube on May 30, 2013 at a total length of three minutes and five seconds.

== Track listing ==
Digital download

1. "Up 2 the Sky" (Radio Slam) [featuring Mr. Shammi] – 3:03
2. "Up 2 the Sky" (Extended Slam) [featuring Mr. Shammi] – 4:47
3. "Up 2 the Sky" (Hands Up DJ Tool) [featuring Mr. Shammi] – 1:02
4. "Up 2 the Sky" (Shammi on da Mic – A Capella) [featuring Mr. Shammi] – 3:26

== Credits and personnel ==
- Lead vocals – Mr. Shammi
- Lyrics – Laurent Wery, Krishna Salickram
- Producers – Laurent Wery
- Label: La Musique du Beau Monde

== Chart performance ==
=== Weekly charts ===
Chart (2012)	Peak position
Belgium (Ultratop 50 Flanders)	41

== Release history ==
Region	Date	Format	Label
Belgium	June 1, 2013	Digital download	La Musique du Beau Monde
