= Hey Hey Hey (Pop Another Bottle) =

2011 single by Laurent Wéry

Single by Laurent Wéry featuring Swift K.I.D. and Dev
- Released: 26 September 2011
- Recorded: 2011
- Genre: Electro house, bassline
- Length: 3:05
- Label: 541, N.E.W.S.
- Songwriters: K. Snelle, Laurent Wéry, A.K. Jermaine, Devin Tailes

Laurent Wéry singles chronology
"Salva Mea" (2011)	"Hey Hey Hey (Pop Another Bottle)" (2011)	"I'm Going In" (2012)

Dev singles chronology
"She Makes Me Wanna" (2011)	"Hey Hey Hey (Pop Another Bottle)" (2011)	"Hotter Than Fire" (2011)

Swift K.I.D. singles chronology
"Hey Hey Hey (Pop Another Bottle)" (2011)	"Bed of Clouds" (2013)

Music video
- "Hey Hey Hey (Pop Another Bottle)" on YouTube

"Hey Hey Hey (Pop Another Bottle)" is a song by Belgian DJ Laurent Wéry, featuring vocals from American singer Dev & American rapper Swift K.I.D. The song was written by K. Snelle, Laurent Wery, A.K. Jermaine, Devin Tailes and produced my Serge Ramaekers. It was released in Belgium as a digital download on 26 September 2011.

== Music video ==
A music video to accompany the release of "Hey Hey Hey (Pop Another Bottle)" was first released onto YouTube on 18 August 2011 at a total length of three minutes and five seconds. It features Swift K.I.D. and Dev, at a house party. Lyrics also appear in the video in the same style seen on the cover art work. The video has had almost 10 million views on YouTube as of April 2020.

== Track listing ==
Digital download

1. "Hey Hey Hey" (video edit) [feat. Swift K.I.D. & Dev] – 3:05
2. "Hey Hey Hey" (extended video edit) [feat. Swift K.I.D. & Dev] – 5:29
3. "Hey Hey Hey" (DJ Licious Dev-ine remix) [feat. Swift K.I.D. & Dev] – 5:02
4. "Hey Hey Hey" (Natural Born Grooves remix) [feat. Swift K.I.D. & Dev] – 6:27

== Credits and personnel ==
- Lead vocals – Swift K.I.D. and Dev
- Producers – Serge Ramaekers
- Lyrics – K. Snelle, Laurent Wery, A.K. Jermaine, Devin Tailes
- Label: 541 / N.E.W.S.

== Charts ==
=== Weekly charts ===
Chart (2011–2012)	Peak position
Australia (ARIA)	2
Belgium (Ultratop 50 Flanders)	16
Belgium (Ultratop 50 Wallonia)	36
Germany (GfK)	27
Ireland (IRMA)	47
New Zealand (Recorded Music NZ)	29
Switzerland (Schweizer Hitparade)	63
US Dance Club Songs (Billboard)	14

=== Year-end charts ===
Chart (2012)	Position
Australia (ARIA)	50

== Certifications ==
Region	Certification	Certified units/sales
Australia (ARIA)	4× Platinum	280,000^{^}
Belgium (BRMA)	Gold	15,000^{*}
^{*} Sales figures based on certification alone.^{^} Shipments figures based on certification alone.

== Release history ==
Region	Date	Format	Label
Belgium	26 September 2011	Digital download	541, N.E.W.S.
United Kingdom	18 December 2011	Digital download	Warner
