= The Chokin' Kind (album) =

Studio album by Joe Simon
- Released: 1969
- Recorded: Music City Recorders (Nashville, Tennessee)
- Genre: Soul, R&B
- Label: Sound Stage 7
- Producer: John Richbourg

Joe Simon chronology
Simon Sings (1968)	The Chokin' Kind (1969)	Joe Simon...Better Than Ever (1969)

Singles from The Chokin' Kind
- 1. "The Chokin' Kind" Released: February 1969; 2. "Baby, Don't Be Looking in My Mind" Released: June 1969

Professional ratings
Review scores
Source	Rating
AllMusic	4/5 stars

The Chokin' Kind is the fourth studio album recorded by American singer Joe Simon, released in 1969 on the Sound Stage 7 label.

== Chart performance ==
The album peaked at No. 18 on the R&B albums chart and No. 81 on the Billboard Top LPs chart. The album features the title track, which peaked at No. 1 on the Hot Soul Singles chart and No. 13 on the Billboard Hot 100, "Baby, Don't Be Looking in My Mind", which charted at No. 16 on the Hot Soul Singles chart and No. 72 on the Billboard Hot 100, and "Yours Love", which reached No. 10 on the Hot Soul Singles Chart and No. 78 on the Billboard Hot 100.

== Track listing ==
Side one
No.	Title	Writer(s)	Length
1.	"Baby, Don't Be Looking in My Mind"	Harlan Howard	2:42
2.	"(Sittin' On) The Dock of the Bay"	Otis Redding, Steve Cropper	2:47
3.	"Little Green Apples"	Bobby Russell	3:12
4.	"Lonely Man"	Delmar Donnell	2:44
5.	"The Chokin' Kind"	Harlan Howard	2:38

Side two
No.	Title	Writer(s)	Length
6.	"Yours Love"	Harlan Howard	3:03
7.	"Help Yourself (To All My Lovin')"	Scott English, Jerry Ross, Mark Barkan	2:21
8.	"Wichita Lineman"	Jimmy Webb	3:18
9.	"Don't Let Me Lose the Feeling"	Allen Orange	2:19
10.	"I'm Too Far Gone to Turn Around"	Clyde Otis, Belford Hendricks	2:28
11.	"In the Still of the Night (I'll Remember)"	Fred Parris	2:44

== Charts ==
Chart (1969)	Peak
U.S. Billboard Top LPs	81
U.S. Billboard Top Soul LPs	18

Singles

Year	Single	Peak	
Year	Single	US	US R&B
1969	"The Chokin' Kind"	13	1
1969	"Baby, Don't Be Looking in My Mind"	72	16
1970	"Yours Love"	78	10
