= Get Down (album) =

Studio album by Joe Simon
- Released: 1975
- Studio: Mediasound (New York City); Bell Sound (New York City)
- Genre: Soul, R&B
- Label: Spring
- Producer: Raeford Gerald, Joe Simon, Ed Townsend

Joe Simon chronology
Mood, Heart and Soul (1974)	Get Down (1975)	Today (1976)

Professional ratings
Review scores
Source	Rating
AllMusic	3/5 stars
The Encyclopedia of Popular Music	3/5 stars
The Rolling Stone Album Guide	2.5/5 stars

Get Down is a studio album by the American singer Joe Simon, released in 1975 on Spring Records.

== Chart performance ==
The album peaked at No. 10 on the R&B albums chart. It also reached No. 129 on the Billboard 200. The album features the singles "Get Down, Get Down (Get on the Floor)", which peaked at No. 1 on the Hot Soul Singles chart and No. 8 on the Billboard Hot 100, and "Music in My Bones", which charted at No. 7 on the Hot Soul Singles chart and No. 92 on the Billboard Hot 100.

== Track listing ==
Side one
No.	Title	Writer(s)	Length
1.	"Get Down, Get Down (Get on the Floor)"	Raeford Gerald, Joe Simon	3:51
2.	"Fire Burning"	Raeford Gerald, Joe Simon	3:27
3.	"It's Be's That Way Sometime"	Phillip Mitchell	6:11
4.	"Music in My Bones"	Raeford Gerald, Joe Simon	5:10

Side two
No.	Title	Writer(s)	Length
5.	"You Don't Want to Believe It (My Man)"	Ed Townsend	3:15
6.	"In My Baby's Arms"	Harlan Howard, Raeford Gerald, Joe Simon	3:30
7.	"Still at the Mercy of Your Love"	Rose Marie McCoy, Helen Miller	3:33
8.	"It's Crying Time in Memphis"	Raeford Gerald, Roger Terry, Joe Simon	4:03

== Charts ==
Chart (1975)	Peak
U.S. Billboard Top LPs	129
U.S. Billboard Top Soul LPs	10

Singles

Year	Single	Peaks	
Year	Single	US	US R&B
1975	Get Down, Get Down (Get on the Floor)"	8	1
1975	"Music in My Bones"	92	7
