= Hold On (If You Believe in Love) =

Single by CB Milton

from the album It's My Loving Thing
- Released: 1994
- Genre: Eurodance; Eurobeat; house
- Length: 3:59
- Label: Byte Records; BMG; Logic Records
- Songwriters: Peter Bauwens; Phil Wilde; Xavier Clayton
- Producers: Phil Wilde; Peter Bauwens

CB Milton singles chronology
"It's a Loving Thing" (1994)	"Hold On (If You Believe in Love)" (1994)	"It's a Loving Thing '95 Remix" (1995)

Music video
- "Hold On (If You Believe in Love)" on YouTube

"Hold On (If You Believe in Love)" is a song by Dutch dance music vocalist CB Milton, released in 1994, by Byte, BMG and Logic Records, as the fourth single from Milton's debut album, It's My Loving Thing (1994). Written by Peter Bauwens, Phil WIlde and Xavier Clayton, and produced by Bauwens and Wilde, the song achieved moderate success in Europe. It was a top-20 hit in both Belgium and Finland, and a top-40 hit in Milton's native Netherlands. Additionally, "Hold On (If You Believe in Love)" reached number 62 on the UK Singles Chart. The accompanying music video was directed by Nick Burgess-Jones.

== Critical reception ==
Pan-European magazine Music & Media wrote that "Hold On (If You Believe in Love)" "is more or less styled after the golden age of Stock. Aitken & Waterman". They later added, "Whereas all competitors use hordes of female backing vocalists and a male rapper, a cheap sequencer, a simple pop song and his own voice is all this Euro dance singer needs." A reviewer from Music Week gave it a score of three out of five, commenting, "CB's excellent debut single 'It's a Loving Thing' deserved more chart glory than its number 32 peak. The follow-up, in the same frantic Eurobeat vein, will do well to go higher." James Hamilton from the Record Mirror Dance Update declared it as a "doubtless smashbound gruffy melodic exciting Belgia galloper from the 2 Unlimited stable".

== Track listing ==
- 12", Germany (1994)
1. "Hold On" (Euro Extended) — 6:04
2. "Hold On" (X-Out In Rio) — 5:42
3. "Hold On" (X-Out In Trance)
- CD single, Belgium (1994)
1. "Hold On" (Euro Edit) — 3:59
2. "Hold On" (Album Version) — 3:46
- CD maxi, Benelux (1994)
1. "Hold On" (Euro Edit) — 3:59
2. "Hold On" (Euro Extended) — 6:05
3. "Hold On" (X-Out In Rio) — 5:42
4. "Hold On" (X-Out In Trance) — 6:18

== Charts ==
Chart (1994–1995)	Peak position
Belgium (Ultratop 50 Flanders)	15
Europe (Eurochart Hot 100)	99
Finland (IFPI)	15
Israel (Israeli Singles Chart)	18
Netherlands (Dutch Top 40)	33
Netherlands (Single Top 100)	35
Scotland (OCC)	58
UK Singles (OCC)	62
UK Club Chart (Music Week)	35
UK Pop Tip Club Chart (Music Week)	22
