= It's a Loving Thing =

Single by CB Milton

from the album It's My Loving Thing
- Released: 1994
- Studio: Soundsational Studio
- Genre: Dance-pop; Eurodisco; techno-pop
- Length: 4:02
- Label: Byte; SGA
- Songwriters: Phil Wilde; Peter Bauwens; Michael Leahy
- Producers: Phil Wilde; Peter Bauwens

CB Milton singles chronology
"No One Else" (1993)	"It's a Loving Thing" (1994)	"Hold On (If You Believe in Love)" (1994)

Music video
- "It's a Loving Thing" on YouTube

"It's a Loving Thing" is a song by Dutch dance music vocalist CB Milton, released in 1994 by Byte Records and SGA as the third single from his debut album by the same name (1994). The song was both co-written and co-produced by 2 Unlimited-producer Phil Wilde and became a sizeable hit in Europe. It reached number three in Belgium, and was a top-20 hit in both the Netherlands and Finland, peaking at numbers 16 and 19, respectively. In the UK, the song peaked at number 49, but in March 1995, a remixed version reached number 34. On the UK Dance Singles Chart, it fared better, reaching number 27, while on the European Dance Radio Chart, it peaked at number one. Outside Europe, "It's a Loving Thing" hit success in Israel, peaking at number three. Two different music videos were made to promote the single.

== Critical reception ==
In his weekly UK chart commentary, James Masterton wrote, "For a change, some of the best pop records are down in the lower reaches this week. The debut hit for CB Milton follows a tried and tested Eurodisco formula and in the footsteps of artists such as Haddaway. The result is an extremely radio-friendly hit single which deserves better things than this chart position." Pan-European magazine Music & Media commented that Milton "has drunk out of Haddaway's cup, and now he knows what's love. And what's more, his producers provided him with the right pop techno slammer." They also complimented it as "a restoration of the old values of pop dance."

A reviewer from Music Week gave the song a score of three out of five, adding, "Milton's soulful voice is down in the mix on this relentless Euro techno stomper, unsurprisingly remixed by the 2 Unlimited production team. Annoying, and annoyingly catchy." In 1995, the magazine named it an "excellent debut single" that "deserved more chart glory than its number 32 peak." James Hamilton from the Record Mirror Dance Update declared it as a "huskily lisping black Dutchman's cheesy synth seared galloping 0-137.9bpm Haddaway-ish but more frantic catchy Euro smash" in his weekly dance column.

== Track listing ==
- 7", Belgium (1994)
1. "It's a Loving Thing" (Airplay Edit) – 4:01
2. "It's a Loving Thing" (Continental Edit) – 3:59
- 7" single, UK (1995)
1. "It's a Loving Thing" (New Mix 7") – 3:50
2. "It's a Loving Thing" (Greed Club Thang Mix) – 4:41
- CD single, UK (1994)
1. "It's a Loving Thing" (Airplay Edit) – 4:01
2. "It's a Loving Thing" (Continental Edit) – 3:59
3. "It's a Loving Thing" (Continental Clubmix) – 6:14
4. "It's a Loving Thing" (X-Out in Trance) – 7:04
5. "It's a Loving Thing" (Extended) – 5:54
- CD maxi, UK (1995)
1. "It's a Loving Thing" (New Mix 7") – 3:50
2. "It's a Loving Thing" (Airplay Edit) – 4:01
3. "It's a Loving Thing" (New 12" Mix) – 5:48
4. "It's a Loving Thing" (Continental Club-Mix) – 6:14
5. "It's a Loving Thing" (Greed Lovin' Club Mix) – 7:26
6. "It's a Loving Thing" (Greed Club Thang Mix) – 4:11
7. "It's a Loving Thing" (X-Out In Trance) – 7:04

== Charts ==
=== Weekly charts ===
Chart (1994–1995)	Peak positions
Belgium (Ultratop 50 Flanders)	3
Europe (Eurochart Hot 100)	41
Europe (European Dance Radio)	1
Finland (IFPI)	19
Israel (Israeli Singles Chart)	3
Italy (Musica e dischi)	22
Netherlands (Dutch Top 40)	17
Netherlands (Single Top 100)	16
Scotland (OCC)	40
Sweden (Sverigetopplistan)	33
UK Singles (OCC) (1994)	49
UK Singles (OCC) (1995)	34
UK Dance (OCC)	38
UK Airplay (Music Week) (1994)	39
UK Airplay (Music Week) (1995)	33
UK Dance (Music Week)	27
UK Club Chart (Music Week)	27
UK Pop Tip Club Chart (Music Week)	12

=== Year-end charts ===
Chart (1994)	Positions
Belgium (Ultratop Flanders)	23
Netherlands (Dutch Top 40)	130
