= Ready for the Night (song) =

Single by Laurent Wéry

from the album Ready for the Night
- Released: 22 July 2010
- Recorded: 2010
- Genre: Dance
- Length: 2:50
- Label: La Musique du Beau Monde
- Songwriter(s): Serge Ramaekers, Johan Waem, Laurent Wery

Laurent Wéry singles chronology
"Get Down" (2010)	"Ready for the Night" (2010)	"Salva Mea" (2011)

"Ready for the Night" is a song by Belgian DJ Laurent Wéry, from his debut album Ready for the Night. The song was written by Serge Ramaekers, Johan Waem, Laurent Wery. It was released in Belgium as a digital download on 22 July 2010.

== Track listing ==
Digital download

1. "Ready for the Night" (Radio Edit) - 2:50
2. "Ready for the Night" (Extended Club Mix) - 5:56
3. "Ready for the Night" (A Capella) - 2:28

== Credits and personnel ==
- Lyrics – Serge Ramaekers, Johan Waem, Laurent Wery
- Label: La Musique du Beau Monde

== Chart performance ==
Chart (2011)	Peak position
Belgium (Ultratip Bubbling Under Flanders)	23

== Release history ==
Region	Date	Format	Label
Belgium	22 July 2010	Digital download	La Musique du Beau Monde
