= Ready for the Night (album) =

Studio album by Laurent Wéry
- Released: July 19, 2010
- Genre: Dance; house
- Label: La Musique du Beau Monde
- Producer: Laurent Wéry

Singles from Ready for the Night
- 1. "My Sound" Released: February 14, 2009; 2. "Looking at Me (J'aime regarder)" Released: July 8, 2009; 3. "On the Dancefloor" Released: September 11, 2009; 4. "Nagasaki" Released: November 16, 2009; 5. "Get Down" Released: March 1, 2010; 6. "Ready for the Night" Released: July 22, 2010

Ready for the Night is the debut studio album by Belgian DJ and producer Laurent Wéry, released in Belgium on July 19, 2010. The album peaked at number 95 in Belgium. The album includes the singles "My Sound", "Looking at Me (J'aime regarder)", "On the Dancefloor", "Nagasaki", "Get Down", and "Ready for the Night".

== Singles ==
- "My Sound" was released as the lead single from the album on February 14, 2009.
- "Looking at Me (J'aime regarder)" was released as the second single from the album on July 8, 2009.
- "On the Dancefloor" was released as the third single from the album on September 11, 2009.
- "Nagasaki" was released as the fourth single from the album on November 16, 2009.
- "Get Down" was released as the fifth single from the album on March 1, 2010.
- "Ready for the Night" was released as the sixth single from the album on July 22, 2010.

== Track listing ==
Standard listing
No.	Title	Length
1.	"Ready for the Night" (Radio Edit)	2:50
2.	"My Sound" (Radio Mix)	3:29
3.	"I can Dream about You feat. DeeCee" (Laurent Wery Remix)	3:42
4.	"Eleven" (featuring MC Six) (Creamminals Radio Mix])	3:50
5.	"La Musica" (Laurent Wery Remix)	3:02
6.	"Looking at Me (J'aime regarder)" (Radio Mix)	3:18
7.	"U Got 2 Know" (Laurent Wery Radiomix)	3:24
8.	"Always Been Real" (Laurent Wery Remix)	3:11
9.	"On the Dancefloor" (Radio Mix)	2:55
10.	"What about our Future" (Radio Mix)	3:28
11.	"Nagasaki" (Radio Mix)	3:29
12.	"Ha 'Beira Do Mar" (Radio Mix)	3:09
13.	"Get Down" (Radio Mix)	2:53
14.	"Good Times" (featuring Miss Autumn Leaves) (Laurent Wery Radio Mix)	3:12
15.	"All the Love" (Laurent Wery Remix)	3:27
16.	"Dirty Dalai" (Laurent Wery Remix)	2:59
17.	"Lotus Eater Reloaded" (Radio Mix)	2:55
18.	"Can you Feel It" (featuring CLS) (Laurent Wery Radio Mix)	3:07
19.	"Overheated" (Radio Mix)	3:09
20.	"Little Fantasy 2010" (featuring TeaQue-N) (Laurent Wery vs Sir-G Radio Mix))	3:36
21.	"Missing 2010" (Laurent Wery Radio Mix)	3:33

== Charts ==
Chart (2010)	Peak position
Belgian Albums (Ultratop Flanders)	95

== Release history ==
Region	Release date	Format	Label
Belgium	July 19, 2010	Digital Download, CD	La Musique du Beau Monde
