= The Davis Sisters =

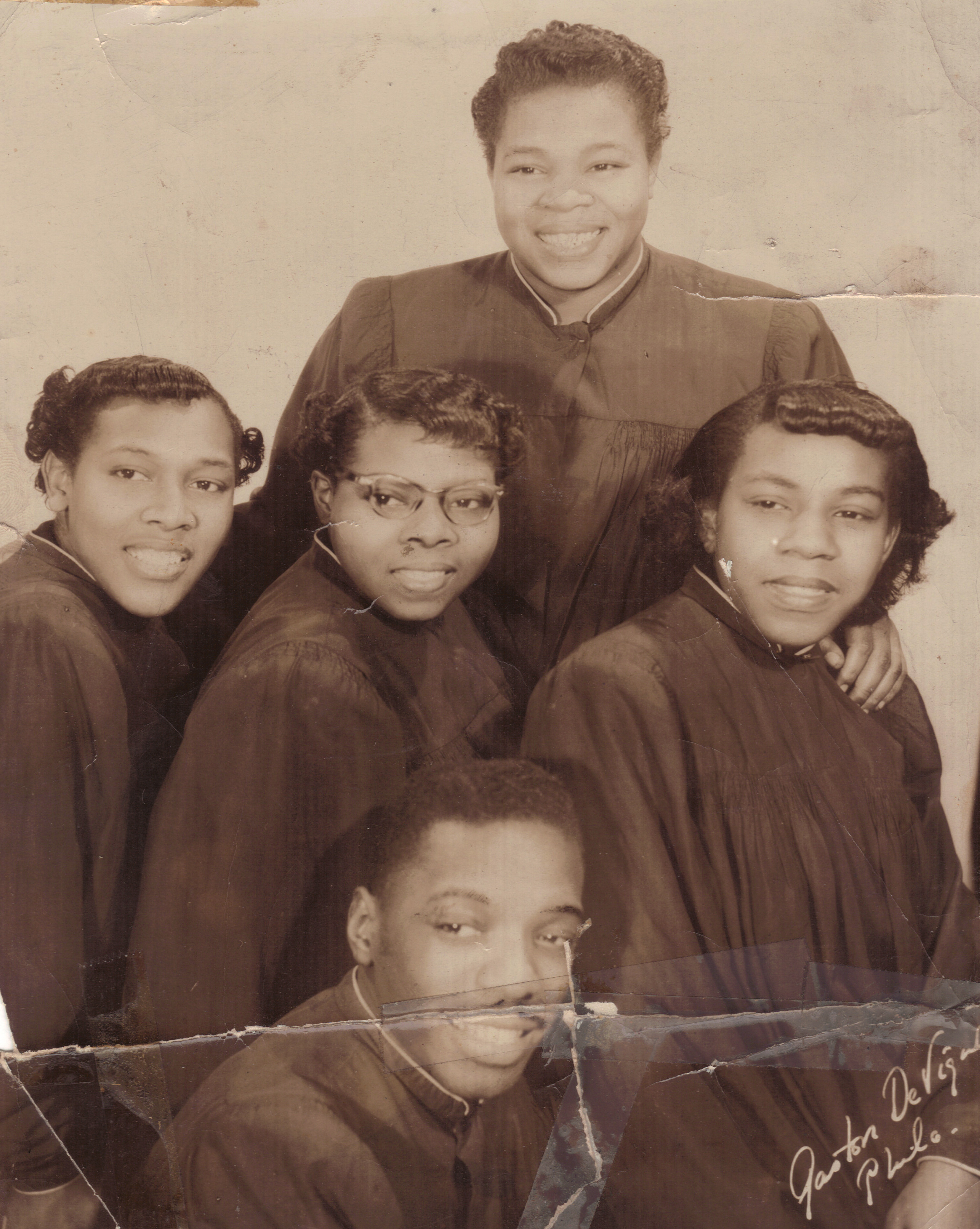
- The Davis Sisters: Ruth, Thelma, Audrey and Alfreda Davis along with Curtis Dublin

Background information
- Genres: Christian
- Years active: 1949–1970

The Davis Sisters of Philadelphia, Pennsylvania were an American gospel group founded by Ruth ("Baby Sis") Davis and featuring her sisters Thelma, Audrey, Alfreda and Edna. Imogene Greene joined the group in 1950, and was later replaced by Jackie Verdell when Greene left to join the Caravans. They were also known as the Davis Group.

== Early years ==
Raised in the Mount Zion Fire-Baptized Holiness Church in Philadelphia, "the Davis Sisters were one of the first female groups to sing 'hard gospel' of the sort being pioneered by the Dixie Hummingbirds and other male quartets of the day." "They achieved a big sound, managing to sound like a choir behind the lead singer by positioning themselves several steps behind the microphone" because Ruth's voice was so powerful it needed that buffer space.

== Origin ==
The Famous Davis Sisters of Philadelphia was founded by Ruth Davis in 1945 in Philadelphia, Pennsylvania. Ruth had enlisted in the Women's Air Corp during World War II to fulfill her patriotic aspirations. During this time her musical and creative instincts came to the forefront of her personality and the nurturing of her artistic side conflicted with the strict military discipline required of WAC's. While she wanted to do her part to rid the world of the Axis evil and minimize Holocaust casualties, she was discharged by the military to Philadelphia in 1945 before the untimely demise of President Franklin Delano Roosevelt and Germany's capitulation. The end of the war was definitely in sight but Ruth was left with the task of carving out her place in the world as a young African-American woman in a world dominated by men. Ruth had been continually inspired by music and had heard the Wings Over Jordan Choir in the military, the old Southern-style male quartets on the radio, and heard the newly developing gospel sound in churches and on programs.

One day in Philadelphia it was raining, visibility was poor and as she was crossing a cobblestone street, she slipped on a trolley track in front of an oncoming trolley. She felt someone lift her up and assist her to the sidewalk underneath a store awning. When she turned around to thank them, no one was there. This experience initially startled her as she thought she was dreaming or in a daze like someone intoxicated, but then the Holy Spirit fell on her and made her realize that this was the answer to her prayer—to have a new purpose in life: to spread the Good News of salvation through Jesus Christ in song. She later realized what a blessing her discharge had been as she was given a headstart on her new career and unknown to her at the time, soon hundreds of thousands, possibly millions of military people would be discharged and sent home looking for new careers. She felt God had really laid His hand on her. Ruth stated to her family that her two musical inspirations, that encouraged her to become a singer, were Ira Tucker and Dinah Washington.

In 1945, immediately after the rain incident, Ruth rushed home and formed all her sisters into a religious singing group with her playing the piano. Alfreda was only 10 years old! Ruth was the spiritual motivator behind the group and had strong religious convictions and her faith fired the faith of her sisters even at their young ages. The girls used the old Baptist Hymnal, sheet music, and songs from the radio and practiced, practiced and practiced. The Davis Sisters finally made their debut at their parents' home in Philadelphia, PA. in 1946.

In Philadelphia the Davis Sisters lived on 2227 N 6th Street at Susquehanna for many years. Later they moved to Cambrian Street near 13th street. They started singing in churches and on programs and became popular. Ruth developed their stage positions around a central microphone to achieve a depth to their combined voices. Their first recording contract was signed in 1947.

Many local concerts were given at the "Met" Theater in Philadelphia, often packing the house. When Ruth Davis would sing "Shine On Me", she would throw her handkerchief in the air: the crowd would be ecstatic. The Davis Sisters' attire was usually plain choir robes, and in the early days they were only accompanied by piano played by Curtis Dublin. The Davis Sisters were involved in the movement of the a cappella quartet sound into female group singing with instrumental accompaniment.

The loss of Curtis Dublin was a crushing blow to the group but they were spiritually resilient and continued their mission to spread the gospel of Christ in song. No one could play like Curtis, with his unique style, speed and timing. The Hammond B-3 organ was more in use in gospel venues and helped fill in the gaps, even when another talented pianist accompanied the group. One by one, over the years, the Sisters themselves passed on to their Greater Reward, but the same Spirit that started the Davis Sisters also kept them going for four decades. Their determined spirit was typified by the title of one of their albums on the Savoy label: "Undaunted". The Famous Davis Sisters of Philadelphia have been unfairly characterized as being an unlucky group because some of their star members died during the group's tenure. The truth of the matter is they have fared about the same as other gospel groups. Very few of the gospel singing stars from the 1950s lived to be 60 years old, including Mahalia Jackson. The Davis Sisters started out during World War II and kept their group together with its original sound and recorded for four decades while maintaining the highest level of popularity on the gospel circuit.

In the 1970s, their sister Ruth, “Baby Sis”, had died. Following this, a strange series of events occurred. Their agent booked the group to sing at Washington Temple COGIC in Brooklyn, New York. This was the church home of the gospel pioneer Madame Ernestine Washington. The group supposedly was running late, and their driver was speeding on the New Jersey Turnpike heading towards NYC. Their car was stopped by a New Jersey State Trooper because of this and the driver explained the situation. Something unexpected occurred; not only were they not ticketed, but the State Troopers escorted their car into New York City to the concert location in Brooklyn. They were still late but the event was a success. Looking back, the group believes that perhaps Ruth was posthumously protecting them.

The Davis Sisters' first professional recordings were made for the Apex label in 1947 and issued on 78 rpm records. In Philadelphia they came under the tutelage of Madame Gertrude Ward, the manager of the Famous Ward Singers, and they added "Famous" to their name at this time. Mother Ward had been recording the Ward Singers on Irvin Ballen's Gotham label since it had moved to Philadelphia in 1948. She introduced the Davis Sisters to him and he loved them and signed them immediately to the Gotham label. In 1949 they recorded Gotham #702, "In The Morning When I Rise". A later issue, Gotham #736 "Jesus Steps In", was covered by Mahalia Jackson on the Apollo label, and the flip side of #736, "Too Close To Heaven", was covered by Alex Bradford on Specialty Records and became a big seller for him. Another notable recording on Gotham was "Get Away Jordan" in which Curtis Dublin sings lead vocal and plays piano.

In 1955 changes took place at Gotham Record Company and Ballen Enterprises, which had their own record pressing plant in Philadelphia. Their continued existence was threatened by a copyright lawsuit over a rock and roll song. Mother Ward had met with great success on the Savoy label where her group was awarded a gold record for "Surely God Is Able" and it was not long before she convinced Ruth and the Sisters to sign with Savoy also. The Davis Sisters' perpetual hit and theme song: "Twelve Gates To The City", the title of their first album issued on Savoy as MG-14000, still sells today. Savoy issued many singles and albums of studio work by the Davis Sisters. Many people who had not seen them in a live concert got to know them and their music by listening to their Savoy albums on the radio or at home. The Davis Sisters were so popular around the world that Savoy continued to market and sell their old recordings even after they had left the label.

In the 1950s and 60's, the Famous Davis Sisters continued to record and tour, using their Philadelphia home as a base of operations. In 1962, the Sisters got into some disagreements with each other and Baby Sis decided she needed more breathing space. She moved to New York City, got her own apartment and formed her own singing group named: "The Ruth Davis Specials of New York City". Herman Lubinsky, their record producer at Savoy, caught wind of this breach and smelled an opportunity to take advantage of this family spat. He signed the New York group to a recording contract and issued the album as "Ruth Davis and the Davis Sisters - On The Right Road", Savoy MG-14072, thinking an enthusiastic but unsophisticated record-buying public would not notice the discrepancy in the product despite its misleading billing. However, this little bit of treachery did not endear Lubinsky to the Sisters and they all left his label the next year for good.

Ruth made up with her sisters and they began touring together again as a family, just like in the old days. In 1964 their concert in Hot Springs, Arkansas was recorded by the prestigious RCA label, which had only recorded a few Afro-American gospel artists before, like Doris Akers and Clara Ward. The RCA album was their first recording in stereo because Savoy's studio did not have the technical capability at that time to engineer dual-channel stereo products. The album was issued as "The Davis Sisters Sing Authentic Southern Style Gospel - Recorded In Live Performance", RCA Victor LSP-2851, and had a color photograph on the cover of the Famous Davis Sisters in their choir robes singing around a microphone, reminiscent of the format of Savoy MG-14000, their first album which was issued almost ten years previously with much less professional photography and graphics.

Personnel changes occurred in the group in the 1960s also and all later recordings were made on regional labels about every five years up until around 1985: sometimes a single 45 rpm and sometimes an entire album, and sometimes not with the full group. Several sides were recorded for Ozzie Cadena's start-up label Choice Records in New Jersey after he, too, left Savoy Record Company. Their last full album in the 1980s was so popular that they re-pressed it to meet demand but they issued it with a different cover: one shows the group standing under a rainbow; the other album cover is a photograph of the Davis Sisters in front of a grand piano. Several television appearances are still available to the public on video websites and some older recordings are now reissued on compact disc. As of 2007, all of the Davis Sisters, their parents and siblings are deceased: only children and grandchildren and three inlaws survive.

== Members ==
The core of the group were biological sisters but over the decades some were replaced by non-related performers.

- Ruth Davis, nicknamed Baby Sis (September 27, 1927–January 2, 1970), founded the group at age 17. She was the featured vocalist with a bluesy voice and could also play the piano but never did on stage. She was the creative brains behind the group's musical arrangements and was not afraid to try something new. Some of her gospel songs contain doo-wop vocal techniques culled from current rock and roll songs. One of her most unusual arrangements was "Earnestly Praying", whose music is a cover to a 1961 pop hit, "Tossing' and Turnin'". The Hammond organ's keyboard-instruments were cleverly used to fill in for other instruments used in the original song. Ruth died on January 2, 1970, 14 years after her sister Thelma passed on the same day. Ray Charles' wife sang at her funeral, which was a 2-day event (a combination of 36 hours) held at Cornerstone Baptist Church in Philadelphia. There was a 160 car processional to her burial at Mt. Lawn Cemetery.
- Alfreda Davis (January 1, 1934–June 15, 1989) She was the long-time business manager of the group. She always collected the money from the promoter before the Sisters entered the auditorium and she led the group on stage. She was the youngest sister who had started singing with them at age 10.
- Thelma Davis (April 1, 1929–January 2, 1956) She joined at age 15, one of the blood sisters. Her biggest hit was "Jesus, He's My King". Thelma Davis also wrote songs for the group. Founder, business manager, as well spiritual leader for the group. She died on January 2, 1956, at age 26 leaving behind her 3 children and husband James Blassingame. A wake was held at Mt. Zion F.B.H. Church the night before and her funeral was held at Cornerstone Baptist Church in Philadelphia. A combination of 12 hours. It was said to be one of the largest funeral in the city of Philadelphia history, the fire marshal had to remove people from the building. Clara Ward sung "The Day is Past and Gone" at the service.
- Audrey Davis (January 24, 1934–July 25, 1982) another blood Sister. She married Curtis' brother, Wilburn Dublin. She had four children from a previous marriage and with her touring with her sisters, the child care issue added stress to the relationship and they eventually divorced. Some would say she was the diva of the group, she would dress up with the finest wigs done at a shop on Germantown ave. Audrey was the soprano of the group, leading few songs such as "Jesus is A Waymaker" and "In The Shelter of the Rock". Audrey had a close bond with Aretha Franklin, they often would trade notes about Sam Cooke. Quoted from Aretha Franklin's autobiography "Aretha: From These Roots" ..........."Audrey Davis of The Davis Sisters and I used to compare notes, and she was buzzing how Sam had married his high school sweetheart and how gorgeous she was and how they were traveling with the baby and how he had bought them all a beautiful new home in California." Audrey Davis passed on July 25, 1982
- Edna Davis - A blood sister, she sang at concerts but was never with the group at a recording session. She is deceased.
- Bernard Davis - youngest blood brother, business manager
- Curtis Dublin (March 9, 1927 – December 29, 1964) pianist, in 1947 he joined the Davis Sisters group when he was 19 years old. He played piano with a strong jazz, bouncy ragtime influence which many early church-goers were slow to accept as religious music in the very early 1950s. He lived on the second floor of the Davis family home in Philadelphia.
- Jackie Verdell ( ?–August 1991) joined at age 15. She was from Camden, New Jersey. As a child she had witnessed her father kill her mother and this left her with a degree of symptoms of Post Traumatic Stress Disorder. The Davis Sisters supported her emotionally and treated her as a blood-sibling. Originally she was singing with Rev. C.L. Franklin's traveling evangelistic troupe. The Davis Sisters were touring with Rev. Franklin and heard Jackie sing and were amazed at her powerful voice and delivery. At a program in Detroit, Michigan they asked Rev. Franklin to release her so they could hire her but he initially refused. They persisted and teenage Jackie Verdell became another Davis Sister and fit in perfectly. She had a solo career several times over the years and did some secular work. Her favorite song, "Kumbaya" was recorded on a Jesse Jackson program. She was nominated for a Grammy but did not win.
- Imogene Green (?–July 1982) soprano. Imogene was from Chicago, Illinois. She had sung with the Caravans, the Gospel All-Stars and another nationally known gospel group.
- Leila Dargan - hailed from Baltimore, Maryland. She is the 2nd lead vocal on the song: "On The Right Road" in the version recorded on RCA Victor LSP 2851 in 1964. She died in a house fire in the 1980s.
- Cynthia Young - vocals. She also occasionally played the piano for the group after Curtis died.

== Discography ==
- 1949 Get Away, Jordan / Jesus Is Near - Apex 1118
- 1949–1952 (Heritage 47, 2003) (Gotham recordings)
- 1950 He Has A Way That's Mighty Sweet / I'll Wait On The Lord - Gotham 639
- 1950 Bye and Bye - Gotham 716
- 1955 Twelve Gates To The City - Savoy 14000)
- 1956 Shine On Me - Savoy MG 14007)
- 1958 He That Believeth - Savoy MG-14014)
- 1958 Plant My Feet On Higher Ground - Savoy MG 14030)
- 1959 Jesus Gave Me Water - Savoy 14036)
- 1962 Somewhere In Glory - Savoy MG 14061)
- 1962 The Famous Davis Sisters Earnestly Praying - Savoy MG 14051)
- 1964 Authentic Southern Style Gospel - RCAVictor LPM 2851)
- 1967 In My Room - Savoy MG 14183)
- 1967 They Wait Upon The Lord - Savoy MG 14199) This Album and following share the same Catalog#
- 1967 Wait A Little Closer - Savoy MG 14199)
- 1970 Get Right With God - Hob 297)
- 1970 Get Right With God - Savoy
- 1970 Ruth Davis Memorial Album - Savoy MG 14250)
- 1973 The Undaunted - Savoy 14306)
- The Best of the Davis Sisters (Savoy LP/CD 7017, 1978/2001; Savoy recordings, 1955–1968)
