= Get Down, Get Down (Get on the Floor) =

Single by Joe Simon

from the album Get Down
- B-side: "In My Baby's Arms"
- Released: March 1975
- Genre: Disco
- Label: Spring
- Songwriter(s): Joe Simon, Raeford Gerald
- Producer(s): Joe Simon, Raeford Gerald

Joe Simon singles chronology
"The Best Time Of My Life" (1974)	"Get Down, Get Down (Get on the Floor)" (1975)	"Music In My Bones" (1975)

"Get Down, Get Down (Get on the Floor)" is a song written by Joe Simon and Raeford Gerald. It was recorded and released as single by Simon in 1975 with both Simon and Gerald serving as producers. It was the last of Simon's three number ones on the soul chart and his highest entry on the Billboard Hot 100 chart, peaking at number eight. In Canada, the song reached number 15.
