= Get Down (Laurent Wéry song) =

Single by Laurent Wéry

from the album Ready for the Night
- Released: 1 March 2010
- Recorded: 2010
- Genre: Dance
- Length: 2:53
- Label: La Musique du Beau Monde
- Songwriter(s): Serge Ramaekers, Chantal Kashala, Laurent Wery
- Producer(s): Laurent Wery, Sir-G

Laurent Wéry singles chronology
"Nagasaki" (2009)	"Get Down" (2010)	"Ready for the Night" (2010)

"Get Down" is a song by Belgian DJ Laurent Wéry, from his debut album Ready for the Night. The song was written by SSerge Ramaekers, Chantal Kashala, Laurent Wery. It was released in Belgium as a digital download on 1 March 2010.

== Track listing ==
Digital download

1. "Get Down" (Radio Mix 2) - 2:53
2. "Get Down" (Radio Mix 1) - 2:56
3. "Get Down" (NBG Radio Mix) - 3:11
4. "Get Down" (NBG Club Mix) - 6:24
5. "Get Down" (Extended Club Mix) - 6:17
6. "Get Down" (X-Tof & Merayah Mix) - 4:59
7. "Get Down" (A Capella) - 4:38

== Credits and personnel ==
- Producers – Laurent Wery, Sir-G
- Lyrics – Serge Ramaekers, Chantal Kashala, Laurent Wery
- Label: La Musique du Beau Monde

== Chart performance ==
Chart (2010)	Peak position
Belgium (Ultratip Bubbling Under Flanders)	44

== Release history ==
Region	Date	Format	Label
Belgium	1 March 2010	Digital Download	La Musique du Beau Monde
