= Looking at Me (J'aime regarder) =

Single by Laurent Wéry vs. Sir-G

from the album Ready for the Night
- Released: 8 July 2009
- Recorded: 2009
- Genre: Dance
- Length: 3:18
- Label: La Musique du Beau Monde
- Songwriter(s): Serge Ramaekers, Chantal Kashala, Laurent Wery, Christophe Baggerman
- Producer(s): Serge Ramaekers, Laurent Wery

Laurent Wéry singles chronology
"My Sound" (2009)	"Looking at Me (J'aime regarder)" (2009)	"On the Dancefloor" (2009)

"Looking at Me (J'aime regarder)" is a song by Belgian DJ Laurent Wéry & Sir-G, from his debut album Ready for the Night. The song was written by Serge Ramaekers, Chantal Kashala, Laurent Wery, Christophe Baggerman. It was released in Belgium as a digital download on 8 July 2009.

== Track listing ==
Digital download

1. "Looking at Me (J'aime regarder)" (Radio Mix) - 3:18
2. "Looking at Me (J'aime regarder)" (Extended Mix) - 5:31

== Credits and personnel ==
- Producers – Serge Ramaekers, Laurent Wery
- Lyrics – Serge Ramaekers, Chantal Kashala, Laurent Wery, Christophe Baggerman
- Label: La Musique du Beau Monde

== Chart performance ==
Chart (2009)	Peak position
Belgium (Ultratip Bubbling Under Flanders)	45

== Release history ==
Region	Date	Format	Label
Belgium	8 July 2009	Digital Download	La Musique du Beau Monde
