= Help Me Make It Through the Night =

1970 country music song by Kris Kristofferson

Song by Kris Kristofferson

from the album Kristofferson
- B-side: "Blame it on the Stones"
- Released: 1970
- Recorded: 1969
- Studio: Monument Recording, Nashville, Tennessee
- Genre: Country
- Length: 2:24
- Label: Monument
- Songwriter: Kris Kristofferson
- Producer: Fred Foster

Audio
- "Help Me Make It Through the Night" on YouTube

"Help Me Make It Through The Night"

Single by Sammi Smith

from the album Help Me Make It Through the Night
- B-side: "When Michael Calls"
- Released: November 1970
- Recorded: May 6, 1970
- Studio: Monument Recording, Nashville, Tennessee
- Genre: Country
- Label: Mega Records
- Songwriter: Kris Kristofferson
- Producer: Jim Malloy

Sammi Smith singles chronology
"Help Me Make It Through The Night" (1970)	"I've Got to Have You" (1972)

"Help Me Make It Through the Night" is a country ballad written and composed by Kris Kristofferson and released on his 1970 album Kristofferson. It was covered later in 1970 by Sammi Smith, on the album Help Me Make It Through the Night. Gladys Knight & The Pips released their cover of "Help Me Make It Through the Night" in 1971 as part of their Standing Ovation album. While the album arrived in 1971, their single version was notably released in March 1972, reaching #33 on the Billboard Hot 100. In 1982, Kris did a re-recording with Brenda Lee for the compilation album The Winning Hand. It has been covered since by many other artists from Tammy Wynette and Johnny Cash to Elvis Presley, Joan Baez, Bryan Ferry, Mark Eitzel, Tyler Childers and Engelbert Humperdinck also as a duet between Michael Bublé and Loren Allred.

== Sammi Smith version ==
Smith's recording of the song (in May 1970) remains the most commercially successful, and best-known, version in the United States. Her recording ranks among the most successful country singles of all time in terms of sales, popularity, and radio airplay. It topped the country singles chart, and was also a crossover hit, reaching number eight on the U.S. pop singles chart. "Help Me Make It Through The Night" also became Smith's signature song.

In May 2024, Rolling Stone ranked the song at number 71 on its 200 Greatest Country Songs of All Time ranking.

== Production history ==
Kris Kristofferson said that he got the inspiration for the song from an Esquire Magazine interview with Frank Sinatra. When asked what he believed in, Sinatra replied, "Booze, broads, or a bible...whatever helps me make it through the night."

During his time as a struggling songwriter, Kris Kristofferson wrote and composed the song while staying with Dottie West and her husband, Bill, at their home on Shy's Hill Road in Nashville's Green Hills neighborhood. When he offered Dottie West the song, she originally claimed it was "too suggestive" for her. Eventually, she would record it before the year was out, and it is included on her album Careless Hands. However, by then, several others had recorded and released versions of it, some garnering great success. Later on, West said that not recording "Help Me Make It Through The Night" when Kristofferson originally offered it to her was one of the greatest regrets of her career.

In August 2010, eighteen years after comforting Sinéad O'Connor when she was booed at the Bob Dylan: 30th Anniversary Concert Celebration, Kristofferson performed "Help Me Make It Through the Night" with her on the Irish talk show Saturday Night with Miriam.

== Chart performance ==
=== Sammi Smith ===
Sammi Smith's recording (made in May 1970) reached number-one on the U.S. country charts and won the Grammy Award for Best Female Country Vocal Performance. On February 20, 1971, it reached number 8 on Billboard's U.S. pop singles chart, and also enjoyed success in Canada. Adult-Contemporary stations took to the song, and it peaked at number 3 on Billboard's Easy Listening chart. Additionally, it spent three weeks at number 1 on the Country chart. The song became a gold record.

In 1998, the 1970 release of "Help Me Make It Through the Night" by Sammi Smith on Mega Records was inducted into the Grammy Hall of Fame.

==== Weekly charts ====
Chart (1971)	Peak position
Australia KMR	7
Canada RPM Top Singles	4
Canada RPM Country Tracks	1
South Africa (Springbok Radio)	19
US Billboard Hot 100	8
US Billboard Easy Listening	3
US Billboard Hot Country Singles	1
US Cash Box Top 100	9

==== Year-end charts ====
Chart (1971)	Rank
Australia	32
Canada	64
US Billboard Hot 100	36
US Cash Box	78

=== Willie Nelson ===
In 1980, Willie Nelson covered the song. His rendition became a hit on the country music charts of both the U.S. and Canada.

Chart (1979–1980)	Peak position
US Hot Country Songs (Billboard)	4
Canadian RPM Country Tracks	1

== Other charting versions ==
In 1971, Joe Simon hit #69 on the Hot 100 and #13 on the Hot Soul Singles chart.

In 1972, a version by Gladys Knight & the Pips reached number 33 on the Billboard Hot 100 and number 13 on the Hot Soul Singles chart, and was a Top 10 pop hit in the United Kingdom.

In 1974, John Holt included the song on his album 1000 Volts of Holt. That year, his recording of the song made it into the UK Top Ten.

In 1975, the French Canadian singer Claude Valade recorded a French version of the song, "Aide-moi à passer la nuit," produced and distributed by London Deram Records. The French-language lyrics were written by Canadian singer-songwriter Christine Charbonneau. The recording was a success and was on the charts (peaking at number 3) for more than six months.

In 2007, it was recorded for a second time in French, with Annie Blanchard recording it on the Musicor Records label, and the song made the Top 20 for 26 weeks, reaching a high of #6.

== Television and film appearances ==
The 1972 John Huston film Fat City (film) features the song, performed by Kristofferson, in both its opening and closing credits.

In 2013, American Idol contestant Kree Harrison sang this song during season 12 on "Songs They Wish They Had Written" week.

== Parody version ==
In 1995, Ray Stevens recorded a comedy version of the song for his album 20 Comedy Hits.
