= Sammi Smith =

American country singer (1943–2005)

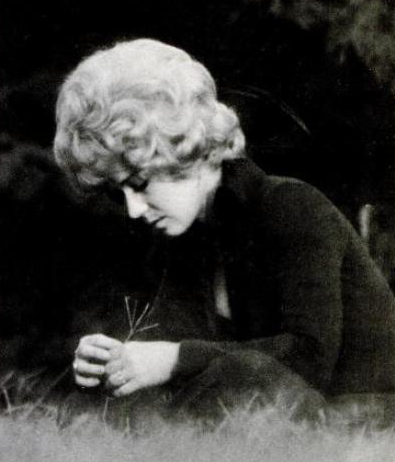
- Smith in 1970

Background information
- Born: Jewel Fay Smith; August 5, 1943; Orange County, California, U.S.
- Died: February 12, 2005 (aged 61) Oklahoma City, Oklahoma, U.S.
- Genres: Country; outlaw country; progressive country
- Occupations: Singer, songwriter
- Years active: 1968–2005
- Labels: Columbia, Mega, Elektra, Cyclone

Jewel Fay "Sammi" Smith (August 5, 1943 – February 12, 2005) was an American country music singer and songwriter. She is best known for her 1971 crossover hit "Help Me Make It Through the Night", which was written by Kris Kristofferson. She became one of the few women in the outlaw country movement during the 1970s.

== Early life ==
Sammi Smith was born in Orange County, California, but spent her childhood in Oklahoma, Texas, Arizona and Colorado. She dropped out of school at the age of 11 and began to sing professionally in nightclubs. She was 15 when she married Floyd L. "Bobby" White, one of the best-known steel guitar players of his day. (White was inducted into the Steel Guitar Hall of Fame in 1990.) They had three children. She had her first divorce in 1966. She eventually had two more marriages. In 1967, Johnny Cash's bass player Marshall Grant discovered her singing in the Someplace Else Night Club in downtown Oklahoma City. After Grant's discovery, she moved to Nashville, Tennessee. When Johnny Cash learned of her talent, he helped her get signed with Columbia Records. Her first minor country hit was in 1968, titled "So Long, Charlie Brown, Don't Look for Me Around". In 1971, she married her second husband, Jody Payne. They had one child, singer/actor/musician Waylon Payne.

== Success of "Help Me Make It Through the Night" ==
"Help Me Make It Through the Night" was Sammi Smith's career hit and the one that made her famous. She had been one of the rare women in the "outlaw country" movement sweeping country music in the 1970s. At this time, country was moving in two directions: "outlaw" and a more mainstream pop sound. However, "outlaw country" was short-lived, with country taking on a distinctly pop cast by the end of the 1970s. Smith remained with the "outlaw" sound throughout the 1970s.

In 1970, Smith signed with a new label Mega Records and her first hit for her new label was called "He's Everywhere", which made the top 25 on the country charts. In 1971, she struck gold with "Help Me Make It Through the Night". The song immediately became a No. 1 hit on the country charts and No. 8 on the Billboard U.S. pop chart. It sold over two million copies, and was awarded a gold disc by the R.I.A.A. in April 1971. At first, record companies were uncomfortable with the song's honest sexuality, which was new for country music, but DJs tested the song and the response from listeners was enormous. The song had been composed by Kris Kristofferson, who had recorded the only other previous version of the song. After Smith's hit, the song was covered by Gladys Knight & the Pips and Elvis Presley; both versions achieved more modest chart success.

In 1972, Sammi Smith won a Grammy Award for Best Female Country Vocal Performance that year, and Kristofferson took songwriting awards.

Critics David Cantwell and Bill Friskics-Warren called "Help Me Make It Through the Night" "a watershed event in the history of Nashville and country music" and placed it at No. 1 in their book Heartaches by the Number: Country Music's 500 Greatest Singles. "The dynamic country soul of the recording — thanks, for starters, to producer Jim Malloy and arranger Bill Walker — revealed the influences of a generation of Nashville music makers who had grown up listening not only to country music but also to rock & roll, jazz, pop, R&B, and even classical music," they wrote. "A crossover smash, 'Help Me Make It Through the Night' signaled country's belated arrival in the rock and soul era."

== After "Help Me Make It Through the Night" ==
After the success of her hit, Smith had more success on the country charts. In 1973, Sammi moved to Dallas, Texas, with Waylon Jennings and Willie Nelson to become a country "outlaw". Smith had an ongoing friendship with Jennings and Nelson for the rest of her life.

Smith had success with the Mega Records label until 1975. She reached Billboard's Hot Country Singles Top 10 twice after the success of "Help Me Make It Through the Night" with "Then You Walk In" (1971) and Merle Haggard's "Today I Started Loving You Again" (1975), her last top 10 hit. In 1972, "I've Got to Have You" was a successful country hit, and it broke onto the pop charts at No. 77. Smith continued to score Top 40 country hits like "The Rainbow in Daddy's Eyes" (1974) and "Long Black Veil" (1974).

In 1976, after Mega Records closed its doors, Smith signed with Elektra Records and scored with several hits, including "Sunday School to Broadway" (1976), "Loving Arms" (1977), "I Can't Stop Loving You" (1977), and "Days That End in Y" (1977).

In 1979, Smith made a successful comeback album on Cyclone Records titled Girl Hero. The song "What a Lie" from this album became a top 20 country hit for Smith, peaking at No. 16. She also recorded for Sound Factory Records during the early 1980s and scored her last top 20 in 1981 with "Cheatin's a Two-Way Street." Her last charting single came in 1986 with "Love Me All Over", which peaked at No. 80 on Billboard's Hot Country Singles chart in 1986.

== Decline and retirement ==
After 1979, little was heard from Sammi Smith. She had moved to Arizona and became involved in Native American causes, working for Apaches. She also started her own band named Apache Spirit, which was made up of Native Americans. In the mid-1980s, she married her final husband Johnny Johnson, and they ran a Cattle Ranch in Bristow, Oklahoma. She did appearances on the Grand Ole Opry in Nashville. She also toured Japan. She often brought her son Waylon Payne to guest star at the Opry. She also had a line of pottery, bath salts, and hand-painted ceramic tiles for the bathroom.

In 1995, the compilation album The Best of Sammi Smith was released, which consisted of her big hit and many other various countrypolitan songs. She had a total of 18 LPs during her career.

== Death ==
On February 12, 2005, at the age of 61, Sammi Smith died at her home in Oklahoma City of emphysema. Her remains were buried in Guymon, Oklahoma which she claimed was her home town (in a Hee Haw episode that aired January 1, 1973).

A tribute album was released in her honor on September 26, 2006, titled Help Me Make It Through the Night: The Memorial Album.

== Family ==
Her first husband was Hank Thompson's Brazos Valley steel guitarist Bob White. They had three children. Zenithapollostar born June 9, 1962, Robert Floyd White born November 26, 1963, and Snow Jewel White born December 9, 1964. Sammi and Bob divorced after their third child. Sammi later had a third son with Willie Nelson's guitarist Jody Payne. Waylon Malloy Payne was born April 5, 1972. Later she adopted two Apache sons, Albert and Alfred.

== Awards ==
=== CMA Awards ===
- 1971: Single of the Year for "Help Me Make It Through the Night"

=== Grammy Awards ===
- 1972: Best Female Country Vocal Performance for "Help Me Make It Through the Night"
- 1998: Grammy Hall of Fame for "Help Me Make It Through the Night"

== Award nominations ==
=== CMA Awards ===
- 1971: Album of the Year for Help Me Make It Through the Night
- 1971: Female Vocalist of the Year
