= Mega Records =

American record label (founded 1970)

Mega Records was a music label based in Nashville founded in 1970 by former RCA Records executive Brad McCuen Harry E. Pratt. Its most successful recording artist was Sammi Smith who also recorded the label's first single. She recorded 16 singles for Mega which charted. Mega's other notable recording artist was Apollo 100. Bill Black's Combo recorded for the label, which lasted until 1976.

== See also ==
- List of record labels
