= Spring Records =

American record label

Spring Records was an American record label established in New York City in 1967. It was formed out of an artist-and-production management company set up earlier by Bill Spitalsky, Roy Rifkind, and Jules "Julie" Rifkind. The label name came from the trio’s surnames, "Sp" for Spitalsky and "ri" for Rifkind. It was distributed by Polydor Records.

The label primarily released soul and funk music, and was described as "one of the most important soul labels of the 1970s". Initial recordings were distributed through MGM Records, but it was later associated with Polydor Records after PolyGram bought the former in 1974, which handled distribution and marketing.

The label released successful recordings once it got into its stride in 1970, mainly by Millie Jackson, Joe Simon, and the Fatback Band, as well as Jocelyn Brown, Garland Green, and Paul Evans. It also started two subsidiary labels, Event and Posse. Spring's in-house producer for a large part of the 1970s was Raeford Gerald, who worked with both Jackson and Simon, but the label also used other producers, such as Brad Shapiro (for Millie Jackson), John Richbourg (for Joe Simon), and the Fatback Band handled its own production.

Spring ended its association with Polydor, which was eventually absorbed by PolyGram, in 1983, but continued as an independent label for some years, mainly releasing disco tracks. The major selling acts of the 1970s by then had left the label. The company was formally shut down in 1993.

Jules Rifkind is the father of Steve Rifkind, founder of Loud Records. Roy Rifkind is the father of Randy and Jaimison Roberts. Randy was the drummer and a founding member of the Buchanan Brothers, which briefly toured with the Beach Boys. Roberts went on to be a prominent music attorney.
