= The Essential Dr. Hook & The Medicine Show =

2003 album by Dr. Hook & the Medicine Show

Compilation album by Dr. Hook & the Medicine Show
- Released: September 30, 2003
- Recorded: 1972–1975
- Genre: Rock, pop
- Length: 45:37
- Label: Columbia, Legacy
- Producer: Ron Haffkine

Dr. Hook & the Medicine Show chronology
Love Songs (1999)	The Essential Dr. Hook & The Medicine Show (2003)	Hits and History (2007)

Professional ratings
Review scores
Source	Rating
AllMusic	4.5/5 stars

The Essential Dr. Hook & The Medicine Show is a compilation album by American rock band Dr. Hook & the Medicine Show, released in 2003 as a single disc, 14-track career-spanning anthology. It is part of Sony BMG's Essential series of compilation albums, and includes tracks from Dr Hook's five studio albums Dr. Hook, Sloppy Seconds, Bankrupt, A Little Bit More and Belly Up!.

== Track listing ==
No.	Title	Writer(s)	Originally from	Length
1.	"Freakin' at the Freaker's Ball"	Shel Silverstein	Sloppy Seconds (1973)	2:49
2.	"The Cover of Rolling Stone"	Shel Silverstein	Sloppy Seconds (1973)	2:55
3.	"Sylvia's Mother"	Shel Silverstein	Dr. Hook (1972)	3:50
4.	"Only Sixteen"	Sam Cooke	Bankrupt (1975)	2:47
5.	"A Little Bit More"	Bobby Gosh	A Little Bit More (1976)	2:53
6.	"Life Ain't Easy"	Shel Silverstein	Belly Up! (1973)	3:05
7.	"Carry Me Carrie"	Shel Silverstein	Sloppy Seconds (1973)	4:21
8.	"The Things I Didn't Say"	Shel Silverstein	Sloppy Seconds (1973)	2:58
9.	"You Ain't Got the Right"	Dennis Locorriere, Jay David, Ray Sawyer, Ron Haffkine	Belly Up! (1973)	3:31
10.	"I Call That True Love"	Shel Silverstein	Dr. Hook (1972)	3:00
11.	"Makin' It Natural"	Shel Silverstein	Dr. Hook (1972)	2:51
12.	"If I'd Only Come and Go"	Shel Silverstein	Sloppy Seconds (1973)	2:43
13.	"Get My Rocks Off"	Shel Silverstein	Sloppy Seconds (1973)	3:08
14.	"Queen of the Silver Dollar"	Shel Silverstein	Sloppy Seconds (1973)	4:46
Total length:				45:37

== Release history ==
Country	Date	Label	Format	Catalog
Australia	April 14, 2003	Legacy Records	digital download	394945781
Australia	October 1, 2005	Legacy Records	CD	1194566

== Certifications ==
Certifications for The Essential Dr. Hook & The Medicine Show
Region	Certification	Certified units/sales
United Kingdom (BPI)	Gold	100,000^{‡}
^{‡} Sales+streaming figures based on certification alone.
