= Dr. Hook Revisited =

1976 album by Dr. Hook

Compilation album by Dr. Hook
- Released: 1976
- Genre: Rock; pop
- Length: 32:37
- Label: Columbia; CBS
- Producer: Ron Haffkine

Dr. Hook chronology
| A Little Bit More (1976) | Dr. Hook Revisited (1976) | The Best Of Dr. Hook (1976) |

Professional ratings
Review scores
| Source | Rating |
|---|---|
| AllMusic | 4/5 stars |

The Best of Dr. Hook, later re-titled Revisited, is the first compilation album by American country rock band Dr. Hook, released in 1976. The songs are taken from Dr. Hook's first three studio albums.

== Track listing ==
All tracks composed by Shel Silverstein

| No. | Title | Originally from | Length |
|---|---|---|---|
| 1. | "Sylvia's Mother" | Dr. Hook (1972) | 3:50 |
| 2. | "Acapulco Goldie" | Belly Up! (1973) & B-Side Of Cops And Robbers (1974) | 2:21 |
| 3. | "Freakin' at the Freaker's Ball" | Sloppy Seconds (1973) | 2:48 |
| 4. | "Makin' It Natural" | Dr. Hook (1972) | 2:51 |
| 5. | "Penicillin Penny" | Belly Up! (1973) | 2:51 |
| 6. | "The Cover of Rolling Stone" | Sloppy Seconds (1973) | 2:54 |
| 7. | "Get My Rocks Off" | Sloppy Seconds (1973) | 3:07 |
| 8. | "Carry Me, Carrie" | Sloppy Seconds (1973) | 4:19 |
| 9. | "Queen Of The Silver Dollar" | Sloppy Seconds (1973) | 4:44 |
| 10. | "Roland The Roadie And Gertrude The Groupie" | Belly Up! (1973) | 3:04 |
| Total length: | | | 32:37 |

== Personnel ==
- Ray Sawyer – lead vocals
- Dennis Locorriere – lead guitar, lead vocals
- George Cummings – steel, electric and Hawaiian guitars, backing vocals
- Rik Elswit – rhythm guitar
- Billy Francis – keyboards, backing vocals
- Jance Garfat – bass
- Jay David – drums, backing vocals

== Charts ==
| Chart (1976) | Peak position |
|---|---|
| Norway VG-lista | 17 |
