= Greatest Hits (Dr. Hook album) =

Greatest hits album by Dr. Hook
- Released: 1980
- Recorded: 1971–1979
- Genre: Country rock
- Length: 45:29
- Label: Capitol
- Producer: Ron Haffkine

Dr. Hook & the Medicine Show chronology
| Rising (1980) | Greatest Hits (1980) | Live in the U.K. (1981) |

Professional ratings
Review scores
| Source | Rating |
|---|---|
| AllMusic | 4/5 stars |

Greatest Hits is a compilation album of hits by Dr. Hook released in 1980. The album spent 4 weeks at the top of the Australian album charts in 1981. In 1987, an expanded CD version was released by Capitol under the title Greatest Hits (and More).

== Track listings ==
=== Original 1980 release ===
1. "Sylvia's Mother" – 3:55
2. "The Cover of the Rolling Stone" – 2:52
3. "Only Sixteen" – 2:44
4. "A Little Bit More" – 2:56
5. "Walk Right In" – 3:04
6. "Sharing the Night Together" – 2:54
7. "When You're in Love with a Beautiful Woman" – 2:58
8. "Better Love Next Time" – 2:59
9. "Sexy Eyes" – 3:30
10. "Years from Now" – 3:14

=== UK 1980 release (Capitol Records EST 26037) ===
1. "Sylvia's Mother" – 3:55
2. "The Cover of the Rolling Stone" – 2:52
3. "Everybody's Making It Big But Me" - 2:58
4. "You Make My Pants Want To Get Up And Dance" - 2:25
5. "Sleeping Late" 3:13
6. "Only Sixteen" – 2:44
7. "Walk Right In" – 3:04
8. "The Millionaire" - 3:13
9. "More Like the Movies" - 3:43
10. "When You're in Love with a Beautiful Woman" – 2:58
11. "Sexy Eyes" – 3:30
12. "If Not You" - 3:13
13. "A Little Bit More" – 2:56
14. "Sharing the Night Together" – 2:54
15. "I Don't Want To Be Alone Tonight" - 3:24
16. "Better Love Next Time" – 2:59
17. "In Over My Head" - 3:42
18. "Years from Now" – 3:14

This collection was released on vinyl and cassette. A later compilation, "Completely Hooked", was released on CD with the same track listing and running order, but with two additional tracks "Sweetest Of All" and "A Couple More Years" which were featured on the 1987 CD release (but not the vinyl or cassette):

=== Greatest Hits (and More) - 1987 CD release ===
1. "Sylvia's Mother" - 3:52
2. "The Cover of the Rolling Stone" – 2:54
3. "Only Sixteen" – 2:46
4. "A Little Bit More" – 2:57
5. "Walk Right In" – 3:07
6. "Making Love & Music" – 2:47
7. "I Couldn't Believe" – 2:49
8. "A Couple More Years" – 3:10
9. "Sharing the Night Together" – 2:57
10. "When You're in Love with a Beautiful Woman" – 2:59
11. "Better Love Next Time" – 3:03
12. "Sexy Eyes" – 3:00
13. "Years from Now" – 2:58
14. "The Radio" – 3:31
15. "Sweetest of All" – 2:39

== Charts ==
=== Weekly charts ===
| Chart (1980–2001) | Peak position |
|---|---|
| Australian Albums (Kent Music Report) | 1 |
| Dutch Albums (Album Top 100) | 5 |
| New Zealand Albums (RMNZ) | 1 |
| Norwegian Albums (VG-lista) | 14 |
| UK Albums (OCC) | 2 |
| US Billboard Top LPs | 142 |

=== Year-end charts ===
| Chart (1981) | Position |
|---|---|
| New Zealand Albums (RMNZ) | 36 |

== Certifications ==
| Region | Certification | Certified units/sales |
|---|---|---|
| Australia (ARIA) | Platinum | 70,000^{^} |
^{^} Shipments figures based on certification alone.
