= Carry Me Carrie =

1972 single by Dr. Hook & the Medicine Show

Single by Dr. Hook & the Medicine Show

from the album Sloppy Seconds
- B-side: "I Call That True Love"
- Released: September 22, 1972
- Genre: Country rock
- Length: 4:18
- Label: Columbia, CBS
- Songwriter: Shel Silverstein
- Producer: Ron Haffkine

Dr. Hook & the Medicine Show singles chronology
"Sylvia's Mother" (1972)	"Carry Me Carrie" (1972)	"The Cover of Rolling Stone" (1972)

"Carry Me, Carrie" is the third single by American country rock band Dr. Hook & the Medicine Show, released in 1972. It appeared on the group's second album, Sloppy Seconds.

Record World said that "Shel Silverstein provides the material, a driving rhythm item that presents the other side of the 'Lean On Me' idea."

== Track listing ==
No.	Title	Writer(s)	Length
1.	"Carry Me Carrie"	Shel Silverstein	4:18
2.	"I Call That True Love"	Shel Silverstein	2:59

== Personnel ==
- Ray Sawyer – lead vocals
- Dennis Locorriere – lead guitar, lead vocals
- George Cummings – steel, electric and Hawaiian guitars, backing vocals
- Rik Elswit – rhythm guitar
- Billy Francis – keyboards, backing vocals
- Jance Garfat – bass
- Jay David – drums, backing vocals

== Charts ==
Chart (1972)	Peak position
US Billboard Hot 100	71
US Cash Box Top 100	74
Canada RPM Top Singles	82
Netherlands	21
Germany	29
