= Sometimes You Win =

Studio album by Dr. Hook
- Released: October 5, 1979
- Recorded: 1978, March–July 1979
- Studios: Muscle Shoals, Sheffield, Alabama; The Sound Lab, Nashville, Tennessee
- Genres: Soft rock, disco
- Length: 32:31
- Label: Capitol
- Producer: Ron Haffkine

Dr. Hook chronology
Pleasure and Pain (1978)	Sometimes You Win (1979)	Rising (1980)

Sometimes You Win is a studio album by the American band Dr. Hook, released in 1979. It was produced by Ron Haffkine.

The album contains three of the band's most commercially successful singles: "When You're in Love with a Beautiful Woman" (also included on their previous album Pleasure and Pain), "Better Love Next Time" and "Sexy Eyes."

== Critical reception ==
Professional ratings
Review scores
Source	Rating
AllMusic	3.5/5 stars

The Boston Globe noted that the "seven-piece aggregation has sweetened its sound with strings and delves into disco with a selection of strong material that should appeal to dancers and listeners alike."

AllMusic deemed the album "something close to a soft rock-disco masterpiece."

== Track listing ==
1. "Better Love Next Time" (Johnny Slate, Larry Keith, Steve Pippin) – 2:59
2. "In Over My Head" (Dan Tyler, Eddie Rabbitt, Even Stevens) – 3:40
3. "Sexy Eyes" (Bob Mather, Chris Waters, Keith Stegall) – 3:30
4. "Oh! Jesse" (Sam Weedman) – 2:54
5. "Years from Now" (Charles Cochran, Roger Cook) – 3:14
6. "I Don't Feel Much Like Smilin'" (Dennis Locorriere, Ray Sawyer) - 2:41
7. "When You're in Love with a Beautiful Woman" (Even Stevens) - 3:00
8. "What Do You Want?" (Eddie Rabbitt, Even Stevens) – 3:08
9. "Love Monster" (Sam Weedman) – 3:10
10. "Mountain Mary" (Ray Sawyer, Shel Silverstein) – 2:37
11. "Help Me Mama" (Ray Sawyer, Shel Silverstein) – 4:02

== Personnel ==
Dr. Hook

- Ray Sawyer – Guitar, vocals
- Dennis Locorriere – Guitar, vocals
- Billy Francis – Keyboards, vocals
- John Wolters – Drums, vocals
- Rik Elswit – Guitar, vocals
- Jance Garfat – Bass
- Bob "Willard" Henke – Guitar, keyboards, vocals

Additional musicians

- Barry Beckett, Billy Puett, David Hood, Jimmy Johnson, Pete Carr (guitar), Jon Goin, Larry Byrom, Mickey Buckins, Randy McCormick, Rod Smarr, Roger Hawkins, Shane Keister
- Diane Tidwell, Lisa Silver, Sheri Kramer, the Cherry Sisters – Backing vocals
- The Nashville Horns – Horns
- The Shelly Kurland Strings – Strings

Production

- Pat Holt – Engineer
- James Cotton – Engineer
- Michael Kanarek – Front cover design and illustration

== Charts ==
Year	Chart	Peak position
1979	Australia Kent Music Report	50
1979	Billboard 200	71
