= All the Time in the World (song) =

Single by Dr. Hook

from the album Pleasure & Pain
- B-side: "Dooley Jones"
- Released: 1978
- Genre: Soft rock
- Length: 2:33
- Label: Capitol
- Songwriters: Even Stevens, Shel Silverstein
- Producer: Ron Haffkine

Dr. Hook singles chronology
"Sharing the Night Together" (1978)	"All the Time in the World" (1978)	"When You're in Love with a Beautiful Woman" (1979)

"All the Time in the World" is a song by Dr. Hook from the album Pleasure & Pain. Produced by Ron Haffkine, it was released as a single in late 1978 and charted on both the U.S. and Canadian singles charts, including the Country and Adult Contemporary charts of both countries.

== Chart performance ==
Chart (1979)	Peak position
Canadian RPM Top Singles	60
Canadian RPM Adult Contemporary	12
Canadian RPM Country Singles	64
U.S. Billboard Hot 100	54
U.S. Billboard Adult Contemporary	41
U.S. Billboard Hot Country Songs	82
