= Pleasure and Pain (Dr. Hook album) =

Studio album by Dr. Hook
- Released: October 6, 1978
- Recorded: 1978
- Studios: Muscle Shoals Sound Studio, Sheffield, Alabama
- Genres: Country rock, soft rock
- Length: 32:45
- Label: Capitol
- Producer: Ron Haffkine

Dr. Hook chronology
Makin' Love and Music (1977)	Pleasure and Pain (1978)	Sometimes You Win (1979)

Professional ratings
Review scores
Source	Rating
AllMusic	3.5/5 stars

Pleasure and Pain is the seventh album from the country rock band Dr. Hook. It featured two U.S. top 10 hits, "Sharing the Night Together" and "When You're in Love with a Beautiful Woman". Both songs also became chart hits in the UK, Canada and Australia.

This particular Dr. Hook album was pressed with two different track line-ups. The first pressing, whose track listing is below, did not include the song "All the Time in the World", as subsequent re-pressings did.

In September 1979, the album was certified gold by the RIAA.

== Track listing ==
1. "Sharing the Night Together" (Ava Aldridge, Eddie Struzick) – 2:58
2. "Sweetest of All" (Shel Silverstein) – 2:42
3. "Storms Never Last" (Jessi Colter) – 3:25
4. "I Don't Want to Be Alone Tonight" (Silverstein) – 3:30
5. "Knowing She's There" (Silverstein, Dennis Locorriere) – 3:26
6. "Clyde" (J. J. Cale) – 4:38
7. "When You're in Love with a Beautiful Woman" (Even Stevens) – 3:02
8. "Dooley Jones" (Hazel Smith, Walter Carter) – 3:48
9. "I Gave Her Comfort" (Silverstein, Locorriere) – 3:15
10. "You Make My Pants Want to Get Up and Dance" (Sam Weedman) – 3:07

== Personnel ==
=== Music ===
- Dennis Locorriere – lead vocals, guitar, bass, harmonica
- Ray Sawyer – vocals
- Bob "Willard" Henke – guitar, keyboards, vocals
- Rik Elswit – guitar, vocals
- Billy Francis – keyboards, vocals
- Jance Garfat – bass
- John Wolters – drums, percussion, vocals
- Marilyn Martin – backing vocals
- Nancy Nash – backing vocals

- Michael Kanarek – artwork

== Charts ==
Year	Chart	Peak position
1979	Australia Kent Music Report	30
1979	Billboard 200	66
