= Sloppy Seconds (album) =

Studio album by Dr. Hook & the Medicine Show
- Released: November 1972
- Genre: Country rock
- Length: 35:55
- Label: Columbia
- Producer: Ron Haffkine

Dr. Hook & the Medicine Show chronology
Doctor Hook (1972)	Sloppy Seconds (1972)	Belly Up! (1973)

Professional ratings
Review scores
Source	Rating
AllMusic	4.5/5 stars

Sloppy Seconds is the second album by the country rock band Dr. Hook & the Medicine Show. It featured some of their most popular songs, including "Freakin' at the Freakers Ball" and "The Cover of 'Rolling Stone'". It was noted for its "crude sense of humor".

== Track listing ==
All tracks are written by Shel Silverstein.

No.	Title	Length
1.	"Freakin' at the Freaker's Ball"	2:45
2.	"If I'd Only Come and Gone"	2:40
3.	"Carry Me, Carrie"	4:16
4.	"The Things I Didn't Say"	2:54
5.	"Get My Rocks Off"	3:04
6.	"Last Mornin'"	3:52
7.	"I Can't Touch the Sun"	3:31
8.	"Queen of the Silver Dollar"	4:42
9.	"Turn On the World"	3:07
10.	"Stayin' Song"	2:43
11.	"The Cover of 'Rolling Stone'"	2:53
Total length:		35:55

CD bonus track
No.	Title	Writer(s)	Length
12.	"Looking for Pussy"	Shel Silverstein	1:26

== Personnel ==
Music

- Ray Sawyer – lead vocals
- Dennis Locorriere – lead guitar, lead vocals
- George Cummings – steel, electric and Hawaiian guitars, backing vocals
- Rik Elswit – rhythm guitar
- Billy Francis – keyboards, backing vocals
- Jance Garfat – bass
- Jay David – drums, backing vocals

Production

- David Brown – engineer
- Ron Coro – art direction, design
- George Engfer – engineer
- Ron Haffkine – producer
- Glenn Kolotkin – engineer
- Mike Larner – engineer
- Tom Lubin – engineer
- Roy Segal – engineer
- Ken Walz – photography

== Charts ==
Chart (1973)	Peak position
Australia Kent Music Report	43
US Billboard 200	41
Can RPM 100 Albums	16

== Certifications ==
Region	Certification	Certified units/sales
Australia (ARIA)	Gold	20,000^{^}
^{^} Shipments figures based on certification alone.
