= Ned Kelly (soundtrack) =

Soundtrack album by Mick Jagger, Shel Silverstein, Waylon Jennings
- Released: July 1970
- Genre: Country
- Label: United Artists
- Producer: Ron Haffkine

Waylon Jennings chronology
The Best of Waylon Jennings (1970)	Ned Kelly (1970)	Singer of Sad Songs (1970)

Professional ratings
Review scores
Source	Rating
Allmusic	4.5/5 stars

Ned Kelly is the score to the 1970 film about the Australian outlaw Ned Kelly. It features music written by Shel Silverstein, produced by Ron Haffkine and performed by Waylon Jennings, Kris Kristofferson, and Tom Ghent, and a solo track by Mick Jagger, who played the title character.

The album was initially issued by United Artists Records in 1970 as UAS-5213 but reissued in 1974 as UA-LA300G. The album and the film contain music unique to each other.

Rykodisc reissued this album in 1997, with added dialogue from the movie and multimedia files.

== Track listing ==
Side 1

1. "Ned Kelly" – Waylon Jennings
2. "The Wild Colonial Boy" – Mick Jagger
3. "Son of a Scoundrel" – Kris Kristofferson*
4. "Shadow of the Gallows" – Waylon Jennings
5. "Lonigan's Widow" – Waylon Jennings
6. "Stoney Cold Ground" – Kris Kristofferson*

Side 2

1. "The Kelly's Keep Comin'" – Kris Kristofferson*
2. "Ranchin' in the Evenin'" – Waylon Jennings
3. "Blame It on the Kellys" – Waylon Jennings
4. "Pleasures of a Sunday Afternoon" – Waylon Jennings
5. "Hey Ned" – Tom Ghent*

Note: Substantial differences exist between the film and album versions of "Shadow of the Gallows" and "Blame It on the Kellys"

=== CD track listing ===
1. "Ned Kelly" – Waylon Jennings
2. "Such Is Life"
3. "The Wild Colonial Boy" – Mick Jagger
4. "What Do You Mean I Don't Like"
5. "Son of a Scoundrel" – Kris Kristofferson
6. "Shadow of the Gallows" – Waylon Jennings
7. "If I Ever Kill"
8. "Lonigan's Widow" – Waylon Jennings
9. "Stoney Cold Ground" – Kris Kristofferson
10. "Ladies and Gentlemen"
11. "The Kelly's Keep Comin'" – Kris Kristofferson
12. "Ranchin' in the Evenin'" – Waylon Jennings
13. "Say"
14. "Blame It on the Kellys" – Waylon Jennings
15. "Pleasures of a Sunday Afternoon" – Waylon Jennings
16. "Hey Ned" – Tom Ghent
