= Doctor Hook (album) =

Studio album by Dr. Hook & the Medicine Show
- Released: May 1972
- Genre: Country rock; rock
- Length: 32:47
- Label: Columbia; Harmony; CBS
- Producer: Ron Haffkine

Dr. Hook & the Medicine Show chronology
Doctor Hook (1972)	Sloppy Seconds (1973)

Sylvia's Mother
- 1978 re-issued Cover

Professional ratings
Review scores
Source	Rating
AllMusic	4.5/5 stars

Doctor Hook, later released as Sylvia's Mother, is the debut studio album by American country rock band Dr. Hook & the Medicine Show, released in 1972.

== Track listing ==
All tracks are written by Shel Silverstein except where noted.

No.	Title	Writer(s)	Length
1.	"Sylvia's Mother"		3:50
2.	"Marie Lavaux"	Shel Silverstein, Baxter Taylor	2:39
3.	"Sing Me a Rainbow"		2:33
4.	"Hey, Lady Godiva"		2:19
5.	"Four Years Older Than Me"	Dennis Locorriere, Jay David, Ray Sawyer, Ron Haffkine	2:31
6.	"Kiss It Away"		4:03
7.	"Makin' It Natural"		2:51
8.	"I Call That True Love"		3:01
9.	"When She Cries"		3:02
10.	"Judy"		3:41
11.	"Mama, I'll Sing One Song for You"		2:32
Total length:			32:47

== Personnel ==
Dr. Hook & the Medicine Show

- Ray Sawyer – lead vocals, guitar
- Dennis Locorriere – lead vocals, rhythm guitar, bass
- George Cummings – steel guitar, lead guitar
- Billy Francis – keyboards, backing vocals
- Jay David – drums, backing vocals

Production

- David Brown – engineer
- Ron Coro – art direction, design
- George Engfer – engineer
- Ron Haffkine – producer
- Glenn Kolotkin – engineer
- Mike Larner – engineer
- Tom Lubin – engineer
- Roy Segal – engineer
- Ken Walz – photography

== Charts ==
Chart (1972)	Peak position
Australia Kent Music Report	22
US Billboard Top LPs & Tape	45
Canada RPM 100 Albums	38

== Release history ==
Country	Date	Label	Format	Catalog
United States	1972	Columbia	Vinyl LP	C 30898
Australia	1972	Harmony	Vinyl LP (Re-Release)	SCD-499-076
South Africa	1972	Date	Vinyl LP	DAS2135

== Certifications ==
Region	Certification	Certified units/sales
Australia (ARIA)	Gold	20,000^{^}
^{^} Shipments figures based on certification alone.
