= Bobby Gosh =

American musician and songwriter (1936–2025)

- Born: May 31, 1936; Stouchsburg, Pennsylvania, U.S.
- Died: December 31, 2025 (aged 89); Brookfield, Vermont, U.S.
- Website: www.bobbygosh.com

Bobby Gosh (born Robert Gosch; May 31, 1936 – December 31, 2025) was an American musician and singer-songwriter from Vermont known for writing the song "A Little Bit More" which became a hit single when recorded by Dr. Hook in 1976.

== Early life and education ==
Gosh was born Robert Gosch on May 31, 1936, in Stouchsburg, Pennsylvania, to Hans and Margaret (Zeller) Gosch, and grew up in Reading, Pennsylvania. He started studying classical piano at age six. He toured as Kitty Callen's pianist when he was 16. He attended Albright College, graduating in 1958 with a degree in accounting. He married Billi Williams, whom he met at Albright, in 1959. He served in the US Army Reserves where, among other things, he played piano at the officers' club. The couple moved to New York City in 1962.

== Career ==
In New York City, Gosh studied orchestration at Juilliard and played piano and sang in clubs at night. He met Sammy Cahn during this time and they became a songwriting duo. Through Cahn, Gosh met Paul Anka, and Gosh toured for two years as Anka's pianist, orchestra conductor, and co-writer. Gosh sang and played on the original piano-voice demo of Anka's song, "My Way." Gosh signed with Polydor Records and released two solo albums.

The first charting single he wrote was "I've Been There Before," recorded by Ray Price, which reached #11 on Billboard's Hot Country Songs. His 1973 album Sitting in the Quiet contained the song "A Little Bit More" which was recorded by Dr. Hook in 1976. It reached the Top 40, peaking at #2 on the UK Singles Chart and #11 on the US Billboard Hot 100. It was also recorded by Lynn Anderson on her album Wrap Your Love All Around Your Man in 1977. Gosh recorded albums and singles for other labels including ABC, Capitol Records, Paramount and RCA Records. He opened for bands such as Sha Na Na.

Gosh continued to compose, produce, and sing on hundreds of radio and TV commercials including writing "Welcome to Our World of Toys" also known as the "FAO Schwarz Clock Song," which played in all FAO Schwarz stores, and the "come to the honeycomb hideout" jingle for Honeycomb cereal. In 1982, He would write and produce material for Circus Playhouse Food Emporium, a chain of family entertainment centers featuring animatronics. He performed on The Tonight Show and The David Frost Show. The music box tracks on Björk's album Vespertine were recorded at Gosh's home studio. Gosh released music under his own label, Bygosh Music Corporation.

== Personal life and death ==
Gosh and his wife bought a house in Brookfield, Vermont in 1971 and moved there full time in 1975. They operated a restaurant in Randolph, Vermont. They were art collectors and had a personal collection of over 1400 pieces, including works by Ezio Martinelli, Sabra Field, and Philip Hagopian. They had two children. On April 20, 2016, just before marijuana became legal in Vermont, Gosh published a memoir titled Confessions of a Marijuana Eater: A Songwriter’s Memoir. In it he advocated for its legalization and touted its therapeutic effects. Kirkus Reviews called it "An often wild and always engaging autobiography."

Gosh died at home in Brookfield, on December 31, 2025, at the age of 89.
