= Singer of Sad Songs =

Studio album by Waylon Jennings
- Released: November 1970
- Recorded: June–December 1969
- Studios: RCA (Hollywood, California)
- Genre: Country
- Length: 26:44
- Label: RCA Victor
- Producers: Danny Davis; Lee Hazlewood

Waylon Jennings chronology
Ned Kelly (1970)	Singer of Sad Songs (1970)	The Taker/Tulsa (1971)

Professional ratings
Review scores
Source	Rating
Allmusic	4/5 stars

Singer of Sad Songs is the thirteenth studio album by American country music artist Waylon Jennings, released in 1970 by RCA Records.

== Track listing ==
No.	Title	Writer(s)	Length
1.	"Singer of Sad Songs"	Alex Zanetis	2:58
2.	"Sick and Tired"	Dave Bartholomew, Chris Kenner	1:55
3.	"Time Between Bottles of Wine"	Jimmie Morris	2:18
4.	"Must You Throw Dirt in My Face"	Bill Anderson	2:17
5.	"No Regrets"	Tom Rush	3:11
6.	"Ragged but Right"	George Jones	2:12
7.	"Honky Tonk Woman"	Mick Jagger, Keith Richards	2:58
8.	"She Comes Running"	Lee Hazlewood	2:11
9.	"If I Were a Carpenter"	Tim Hardin	2:24
10.	"Donna on My Mind"	Billy Barton	2:12
11.	"Rock, Salt and Nails"	Utah Phillips	2:08
