= Sharing the Night Together =

1976 song by Ava Aldridge & Eddie Struzick

Single by Arthur Alexander
- Released: 1976
- Genre: R&B
- Length: 3:05
- Label: Buddah Records
- Songwriters: Ava Aldridge & Eddie Struzick
- Producers: Al Cartee & George Soule

"Sharing the Night Together"

Single by Dr. Hook

from the album Pleasure & Pain
- B-side: "You Make My Pants Want to Get Up and Dance"
- Released: August 1978
- Genre: Soft rock
- Length: 2:54
- Label: Capitol; EMI
- Songwriters: Ava Aldridge & Eddie Struzick
- Producer: Ron Haffkine

Dr. Hook singles chronology
"Walk Right In" (1977)	"Sharing the Night Together" (1978)	"All the Time in the World" (1979)

Music video
- "Sharing the Night Together" on YouTube

"Sharing the Night Together" is a popular song written by Ava Aldridge and Eddie Struzick. Originally recorded by Arthur Alexander and then by Lenny LeBlanc in 1976, the song was later a single produced by Ron Haffkine and performed by American rock band Dr. Hook from their seventh album, Pleasure and Pain (1978). Cash Box called Alexander's version "a languorous ballad plaintive, that should strike deep in the hearts of R&B, pop and MOR listeners" and praised Alexander's "powerful voice" and how he "sings this love song with special emotion." "Sharing the Night Together" also appeared on most of Dr. Hook's following albums including Greatest Hits and Greatest Hits (and More). It reached No. 6 in the US and No. 3 in Canada in 1978, and No. 43 in the UK in 1980.

== Charts ==
=== Weekly charts ===
Arthur Alexander

Chart (1976)	Peak position
US Cash Box Top 100	94

Lenny LeBlanc

Chart (1976)	Peak position
US Cash Box Top 100	99

Dr. Hook

Chart (1978–80)	Peak position
Australia (Kent Music Report)	10
Canada Top Singles (RPM)	3
Canada Adult Contemporary (RPM)	4
Canada Country Singles (RPM)	40
Netherlands (Single Top 100)	28
New Zealand (RIANZ)	12
UK Singles (Official Charts)	43
US Billboard Hot 100	6
US Adult Contemporary (Billboard)	18
US Hot Country Songs (Billboard)	50
US Cash Box Top 100	4

=== Year-end charts ===
Chart (1978)	Rank
Canada Top Singles (RPM)	66
US Cash Box Top 100	60

Chart (1979)	Rank
Australia (Kent Music Report)	78
US Billboard Hot 100	46

== Certifications ==
Certifications for "Sharing the Night Together", Dr. Hook version
Region	Certification	Certified units/sales
New Zealand (RMNZ)	2× Platinum	60,000^{‡}
United States (RIAA)	Gold	500,000^{‡}
^{‡} Sales+streaming figures based on certification alone.

== Cover versions ==
- In 1978, Jamaican singer Delroy Wilson recorded a reggae version.
- Dobie Gray recorded "Sharing the Night Together" in 1978. It was used as the B-side for his final hit, "You Can Do It" (US No. 37, 1979).
- In 2007, Elliott Yamin included it as a bonus track on his eponymous debut album.
- T-Pain recorded "Sharing the Night Together" for his 2023 covers album On Top of the Covers.

== Popular culture ==
- The song is played in the 2019 Netflix film El Camino: A Breaking Bad Movie; the character Todd Alquist (Jesse Plemons) sings along with his arm hanging out the window, while driving the titular car down the highway.
- Part of the song is played in episode 10 of season 1 of the Syfy television series Resident Alien.
