= The Wild Colonial Boy =

Irish-Australian ballad

"The Wild Colonial Boy" (Roud 677, Laws L20) is a traditional anonymously penned Irish-Australian folk ballad that tells the story of a bushranger in early colonial Australia who dies during a gunfight with local police. Versions of the ballad give different names for the bushranger involved: some based on real individuals and some apparently fictional. A common theme is romanticisation of the bushranger's battle against colonial authority. According to a report in The Argus in November 1880, Ann Jones, the innkeeper of the Glenrowan Hotel, asked her son to sing the ballad when the Kelly Gang were at her hotel in June that year.

== Identity of the bushranger ==
Versions of the ballad depict bushrangers with the first name of "Jack" and surnames such as "Dolan," "Doolan," "Duggan" and "Donahue." It is unclear if the ballad originally referred to an actual person.

One possible origin is Jack Donahue (also spelled Donohoe), an 1820s Irish convict who was sent to Australia, became a bushranger and was killed by police. Another possibility is that the song refers to an 1860s juvenile Australian convict named John Doolan, who was born in Castlemaine, Victoria, and also turned to bushranging. However, the real Doolan was not shot by police, instead being captured and sentenced to an additional convict term. It is also possible that the histories of Donohue and Doolan became blended over time to produce the modern ballad's lyrics. There is also a possibility that the name of the real person was Jack Donahue, whose name was changed over time to mask the song's origins.

== Lyrics and melody ==
'Tis of a wild Colonial Boy, Jack Doolan was his name,
Of poor but honest parents he was born in Castlemaine.
He was his father's only hope, his mother's pride and joy,
And dearly did his parents love the wild Colonial Boy.

Chorus
Come, all my hearties, we'll roam the mountains high,
Together we will plunder, together we will die.
We'll wander over valleys, and gallop over plains,
And we'll scorn to live in slavery, bound down with iron chains.

He was scarcely sixteen years of age when he left his father's home,
And through Australia's sunny clime a bushranger did roam.
He robbed those wealthy squatters, their stock he did destroy,
And a terror to Australia was the wild Colonial Boy.

In sixty-one this daring youth commenced his wild career,
With a heart that knew no danger, no foeman did he fear.
He stuck up the Beechworth mail-coach, and robbed Judge MacEvoy,
Who trembled, and gave up his gold to the wild Colonial Boy.

He bade the judge "Good morning", and told him to beware,
That he'd never rob a hearty chap that acted on the square,
And never to rob a mother of her son and only joy,
Or else you might turn outlaw, like the wild Colonial Boy.

One day as he was riding the mountain-side along,
A-listening to the little birds, their pleasant laughing song,
Three mounted troopers rode along – Kelly, Davis and FitzRoy –
They thought that they would capture him, the wild Colonial Boy.

"Surrender now, Jack Doolan, you see there's three to one.
Surrender now, Jack Doolan, you're a daring highwayman."
He drew a pistol from his belt, and shook the little toy,
"I'll fight, but not surrender," said the wild Colonial Boy.

He fired at Trooper Kelly and brought him to the ground,
And in return from Davis received a mortal wound.
All shattered through the jaws he lay still firing at FitzRoy,
And that's the way they captured him – the wild Colonial Boy.

The tune is an earlier Scottish melody, "The Black Douglas".

== In popular culture ==
- "The Wild Colonial Boy" is sung in the 1952 film The Quiet Man directed by John Ford), in the scene in which American Sean Thornton (played by John Wayne) first appears in the bar in the Irish village of Innisfree.
- In early 1981 members of the American rock band Dr. Hook performed a version of the song, with acoustic guitar accompaniment only, during a live appearance on the Australian variety television programme The Don Lane Show to promote the band’s upcoming tour of the country. The band then recorded a studio version of the song and released it on 1981 Australian pressings of the 1980 album Rising. The song was also released as a 7-inch single and became a Top-Ten hit, peaking at No. 4 on the Australian charts in April 1981.
- The Pogues and The Dubliners released "Jack's Heroes", a 1990 single celebrating the Republic of Ireland national football team, which uses the tune of "The Wild Colonial Boy".
- "The Wild Colonial Boy" is quoted by the character Paddy Mayne in the BBC TV series SAS: Rogue Heroes.
