= Sabra Field =

American printmaker and graphic artist

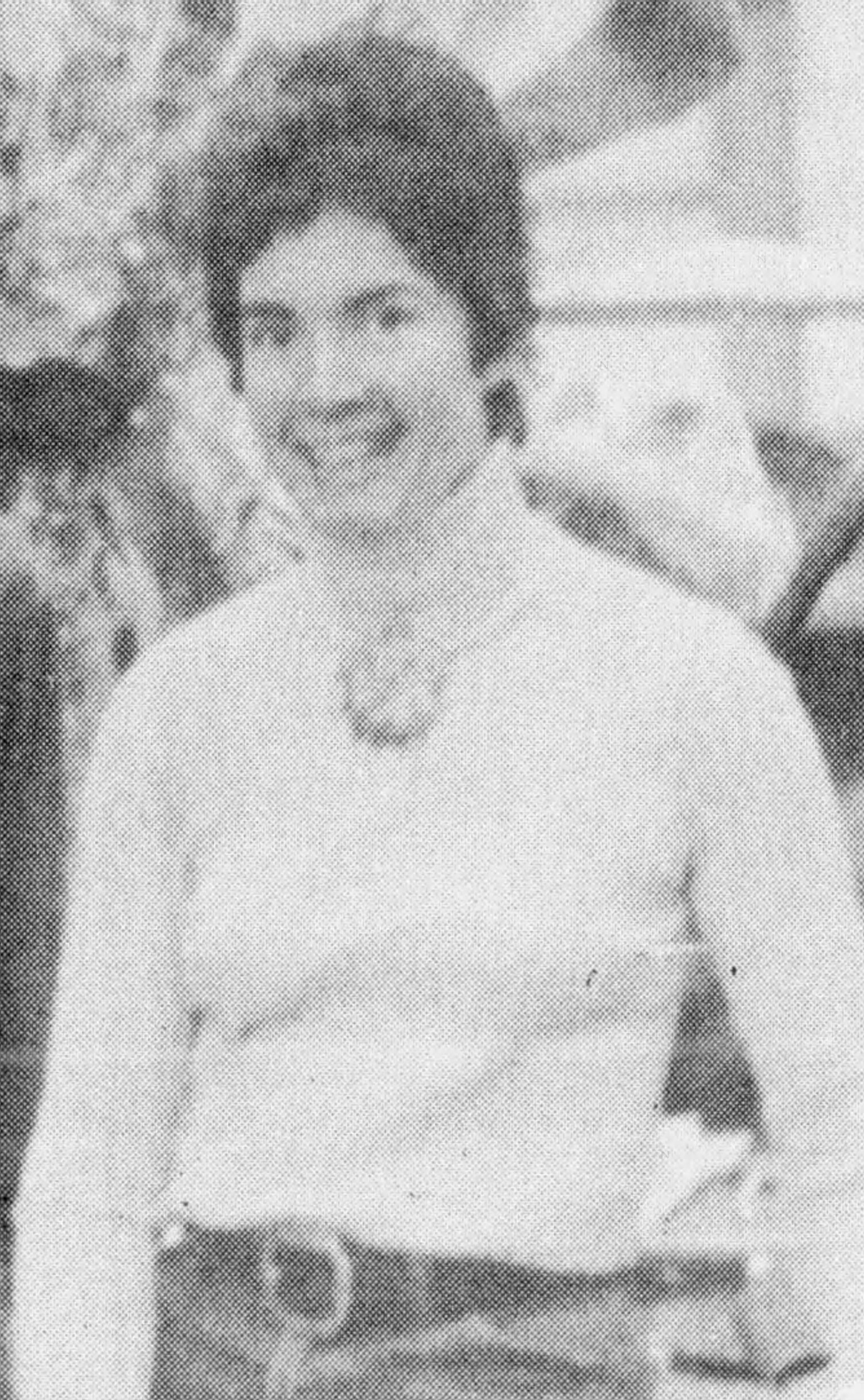
Field in 1975

Sabra Johnson Field (born April 7, 1935) is an American printmaker known for her color woodcuts of the state of Vermont. Her work features on a United States postage stamp commemorating the bicentennial of the state. The stamp, which depicts a Vermont landscape scene of a red farmhouse set on rolling green hills with mountains in the background sold over 60 million units. She has been called the "Grant Wood of Vermont".

== Early life and education ==
Field was born in Tulsa, Oklahoma, on April 7, 1935. She was raised in New York. She attended Middlebury College, where she was mentored by artist Arthur K.D. Healy. Field was the first student to major in art at Middlebury, receiving her art degree in 1957. She then attended Wesleyan University, where she received her Master of Arts in Teaching (MAT) in 1959. She was mentored at Wesleyan by Russell T. Limbach, who introduced her to printmaking.

== Teaching career, move to Vermont, and print work ==
After college, Field taught art at several prep schools in Connecticut. In 1969, she divorced her first husband and moved from Connecticut to Vermont with her two sons. They moved into the Tontine Building, a former 19th-century tavern in East Barnard. There she began working regularly on woodblock prints. She found Vermont conducive to work, stating that she "became part of a different culture where I could live and work at home in a quiet hamlet that was good for kids and without pretense."

== Vermont Bicentennial; postage stamps ==
The Vermont Bicentennial poster contest selected one of her works for a 1975 exhibition in Washington, D.C. The selection led to several commissions, including a 1977 series titled Mountain Suite for Vermont Life magazine. The United States Postal Service released a postage stamp in 1991 commemorating the bicentennial of Vermont's admission to the Union in 1791 as the 14th state. It featured an image by Field of a "red barn, blue sky and green hills." More than 60 million of the stamps were sold.

== Art books and mural ==
Field was the subject of the books The Art of Place (2002) and In Sight (2004). She installed a large-scale outdoor mural titled Cosmic Geometry on the east wall of the Wright Memorial Theatre on campus of Middlebury in 2010.

== Film, children's book, and exhibition ==
Sabra: The Life & Work of Printmaker Sabra Field, a documentary film exploring Field's life, was released in 2015. It was directed by Bill Phillips, a film professor at Dartmouth College. In 2016, Field and Julia Alvarez published the children's picture book Where Do They Go? The book explores the subject of death and grief in rhyming poem. A retrospective show of Field's work was held at the Middlebury College Museum of Art in 2017. It featured 100 of her work from 1962 to the present.

== Awards and honors ==
Middlebury College awarded Field its Alumni Achievement Award in 1984, followed by an Honorary Doctor of Arts in 1991. She was named an Extraordinary Vermonter by Vermont Governor Madeleine Kunin and received the Vermont Governor's Award for Excellence in the Arts from Governor Howard Dean in 1999.

== Selected commissions ==
- Mountain Suite (1977)
- Winter Twilight Norwich University (2018)
