= Sexy Eyes (Dr. Hook song) =

Single by Dr. Hook

from the album Sometimes You Win
- B-side: "Help Me Mama"
- Released: January 28, 1980
- Recorded: 1979
- Genre: Soft rock; disco
- Length: 2:58 (Single edit); 3:30 (Album version)
- Label: Capitol
- Songwriters: Chris Waters; Keith Stegall; Bob Mather
- Producer: Ron Haffkine

Dr. Hook singles chronology
"Better Love Next Time" (1979)	"Sexy Eyes" (1980)	"Years from Now" (1980)

Music video
- "Sexy Eyes" on YouTube

"Sexy Eyes" is a song by Dr. Hook, released as a single in early 1980. It was the second of three singles from their LP Sometimes You Win.

In the United States, the single reached No. 5 on the Billboard Hot 100, tying it with "Sylvia's Mother" as the highest-charting song for the band, and was certified Gold by the RIAA. It was also a Top 10 hit in Canada (#8) and the United Kingdom (#4), in the process becoming the band's last top thirty hit in the UK.

== Chart performance ==
=== Weekly charts ===
Chart (1980)	Peak position
Australia (Kent Music Report)	41
Austria (Ö3 Austria Top 40)	11
Canada Top Singles (RPM)	8
Canada Adult Contemporary (RPM)	1
Germany (GfK)	2
Ireland (IRMA)	3
New Zealand	1
Norway (VG-lista)	8
South Africa (Springbok)	20
Switzerland (Schweizer Hitparade)	6
UK Singles (Official Charts)	4
US Billboard Hot 100	5
US Adult Contemporary (Billboard)	6
US R&B (Billboard)	67

=== Year-end charts ===
Chart (1980)	Rank
Canada	65
New Zealand	27
UK	59
U.S. Billboard Hot 100	25

== Certifications ==
Region	Certification	Certified units/sales
New Zealand (RMNZ)	2× Platinum	60,000^{‡}
^{‡} Sales+streaming figures based on certification alone.
