= Better Love Next Time =

Single by Dr. Hook

from the album Sometimes You Win
- B-side: "Mountain Mary"
- Released: October 1979
- Genre: Soft rock; disco
- Length: 2:59
- Label: Capitol
- Songwriters: Steve Pippin; Larry Keith; Johnny Slate
- Producer: Ron Haffkine

Dr. Hook singles chronology
"When You're in Love with a Beautiful Woman" (1979)	"Better Love Next Time" (1979)	"Sexy Eyes" (1980)

Alternative cover
- UK single sleeve

"Better Love Next Time" is a song by Dr. Hook, released as a single in the fall of 1979. It was the first of three singles from their LP Sometimes You Win.

== Background ==
The lyrics involve the singer comforting and encouraging a grieving and despondent friend who has lost a love, with the reassurance that "better love" will be found in the future.

In the United States, the single reached No. 12 on the Billboard Hot 100 and spent 19 weeks on the chart. It also reached No. 3 on the Adult Contemporary chart. It was less of a hit in Canada, but reached the Top 10 in the United Kingdom (#8) and New Zealand (#7). "Better Love Next Time" is ranked as the 49th biggest American hit of 1980.

== Chart performance ==
=== Weekly singles charts ===
Chart (1979–1980)	Peak position
Australia KMR	24
Canadian RPM Top Singles	39
Canadian RPM Adult Contemporary	10
Germany	33
Ireland (IRMA)	6
New Zealand	7
UK	8
U.S. Billboard Hot 100	12
U.S. Billboard Hot Adult Contemporary Tracks	3
U.S. Billboard Country	91

=== Year-end charts ===
Chart (1980)	Rank
U.S. Billboard Hot 100	49

== Certifications ==
Region	Certification	Certified units/sales
New Zealand (RMNZ)	Gold	15,000^{‡}
^{‡} Sales+streaming figures based on certification alone.
