= The Gurus =

- Genres: Psychedelic rock
- Labels: United Artists Records

The Gurus were an American psychedelic rock band from the 1960s. They were among the first to incorporate Middle Eastern influences, maybe more than any other band of that era. The band broke up without making a large impact on the music scene of the time, although they did release two singles on United Artists Records in 1966 and 1967. Their album, The Gurus Are Hear, failed to be released in 1967, which was noted as the reason for the band splitting up.

The album was finally released in 2003.
