= A Little Bit More =

1976 single by Dr. Hook

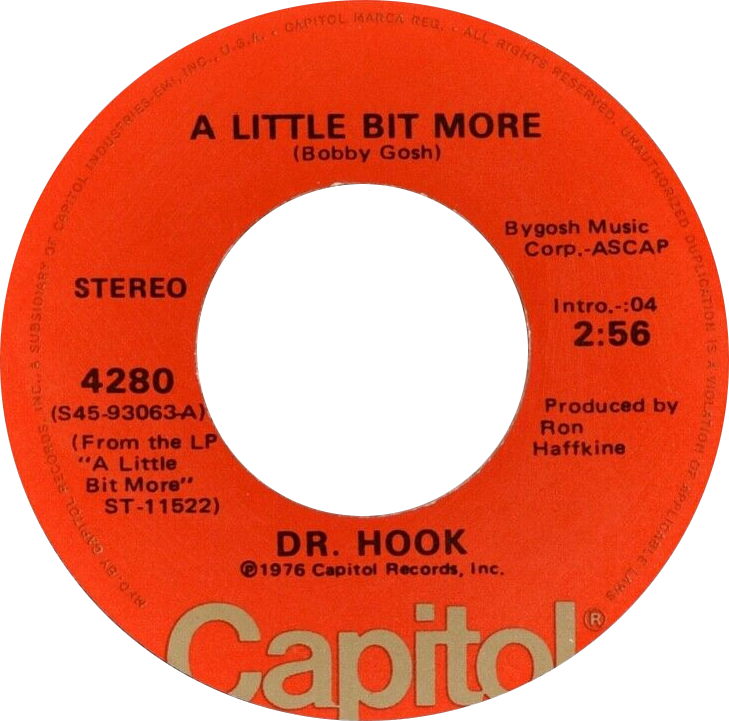
- One of side-A labels of the US single

Single by Dr. Hook

from the album A Little Bit More
- B-side: "A Couple More Years"
- Released: June 1976
- Genre: Soft rock
- Length: 3:14 (album version); 2:56 (single edit)
- Label: Capitol
- Songwriter: Bobby Gosh
- Producer: Ron Haffkine

Dr. Hook singles chronology
"Only Sixteen" (1975)	"A Little Bit More" (1976)	"If Not You" (1976)

"A Little Bit More" is a song written and performed by American musician Bobby Gosh, released on his 1973 album Sitting in the Quiet. American rock band Dr. Hook recorded the first hit version which was released as a single in 1976. It charted at number 11 on the US Billboard Hot 100 and spent two weeks at number nine on the Cash Box Top 100. It reached number two on the UK Singles Chart in July 1976 for five consecutive weeks. It was Dr. Hook's joint second-best UK chart placing, matching "Sylvia's Mother" and surpassed only by "When You're in Love with a Beautiful Woman".

== Charts ==
=== Weekly charts ===
Chart (1976)	Peak position
Australia (Kent Music Report)	10
Belgium (Ultratop 50 Flanders)	30
Canada Top Singles (RPM)	4
Canada Adult Contemporary (RPM)	6
Danish Singles Chart	1
Euro Hit 50	6
Germany (GfK)	42
Ireland (IRMA)	2
Netherlands (Single Top 100)	10
New Zealand (Recorded Music NZ)	13
Norway (VG-lista)	7
Sweden (Sverigetopplistan)	10
UK Singles Chart	2
US Billboard Hot 100	11
US Cash Box Top 100	9
US Easy Listening	15

=== Year-end charts ===
Chart (1976)	Rank
Australia (Kent Music Report)	85
Canada RPM Top Singles	60
UK	7
US Billboard Hot 100	46
US Billboard Easy Listening	25

== Certifications ==
Region	Certification	Certified units/sales
New Zealand (RMNZ)	Gold	15,000^{‡}
^{‡} Sales+streaming figures based on certification alone.

== 911 version ==
"A Little Bit More"

Single by 911

from the album There It Is
- B-side: "Don't Walk Away"; "Baby Come Back to Me"
- Released: January 11, 1999
- Length: 3:46
- Label: Virgin
- Songwriter: Bobby Gosh
- Producers: John Holliday; Trevor Steel

911 singles chronology
"More Than a Woman" (1998)	"A Little Bit More" (1999)	"Private Number" (1999)

English boy band 911 recorded their own version of "A Little Bit More" for their third album, There It Is (1999). It was released on January 11, 1999, in the United Kingdom and debuted at number one on the UK Singles Chart on January 17, 1999, becoming their only number-one single. It also reached number seven on the Irish Singles Chart, becoming the band's only single to enter the top 30 in Ireland, and number 46 in New Zealand.

=== Track listings ===
UK CD1 and cassette single, Australian CD single

1. "A Little Bit More" (radio mix) – 3:46
2. "Don't Walk Away" – 4:00
3. "Nothing Stops the Rain" (French version) – 3:34

UK CD2

1. "A Little Bit More" (original version) – 3:46
2. "Baby Come Back to Me" – 4:26
3. "All I Want Is You" (Spanish version) – 3:50

=== Charts ===
==== Weekly charts ====
Chart (1999)	Peak position
Australia (ARIA)	116
Europe (Eurochart Hot 100)	9
Ireland (IRMA)	7
New Zealand (Recorded Music NZ)	46
Scottish Singles Sales (Official Charts)	1
Spain Airplay (Top 40 Radio)	28
UK Singles (Official Charts)	1
UK Airplay (Music Week)	3

==== Year-end charts ====
Chart (1999)	Position
UK Singles (OCC)	96

=== Certifications ===
Region	Certification	Certified units/sales
United Kingdom (BPI)	Silver	200,000^{^}
^{^} Shipments figures based on certification alone.
