= Ron Haffkine =

American record producer (1938–2023)

- Born: December 13, 1938; New York City, New York, U.S.
- Died: October 1, 2023 (aged 84) Mexico
- Genres: Rock, pop, country, soft rock, Americana
- Years active: 1967–2023
- Labels: Columbia, Capitol, CBS, Casablanca, Mercury, Polygram, Curb

Ron Haffkine (December 13, 1938 – October 1, 2023) was an American record producer, composer and music manager most recognized for his work as a producer and manager of Dr. Hook & the Medicine Show, an American rock band, producing hit singles including "Sylvia's Mother", "The Cover of Rolling Stone", "Sharing the Night Together", "A Little Bit More" and "When You're in Love with a Beautiful Woman" and achieving 67 Gold and Platinum records.

== Career history ==
Ron Haffkine was born in New York City, New York, on December 13, 1938. He contracted polio, at age 12, and remained completely paralyzed for 2 years. At 21, Ron was a musician and composer in Greenwich Village who met and became good friends with 28 year old Shel Silverstein, an American poet, singer-songwriter, cartoonist, screenwriter, and author of children's books. Haffkine formed and managed a band called The Gurus. Wanting to record the group he walked into Regent Sound in NY and explained to a sound engineer named Bill Szymczyk, the soon to be producer of The Eagles, that he wanted to make a record, but knew nothing about the process, Bill agreed to help. During the sessions, Ron would tell Bill: "I'd like to hear this or I'd like to hear that, or... there's not enough of this or there's too much of that". When finished, Ron played it for Shel, known as the writer of "A Boy Named Sue," which Johnny Cash parlayed into a hit, he was so impressed that he told Ron about a couple of films that he was writing the soundtrack for and that he needed someone to produce the music.

== Who Is Harry Kellerman & Dr. Hook ==
Haffkine became the musical director for free for the Herb Gardner movie Who is Harry Kellerman in which Dustin Hoffman, the star of The Graduate, Midnight Cowboy and Little Big Man, played a songwriter. One scene in the Hoffman film required a band on stage, but Ron didn't like the band, so he recommended a band called Dr. Hook. He had heard them playing in a bar called The Sands, in Union City, New Jersey. The producers, Shel and Dustin said "No". Unrelenting, Ron offered to pay for a showcase of the group on the condition that they all attend. They all attended and they all agreed to use Dr. Hook in the film. With the help of producer Haffkine the group recorded two songs for the film: Locorriere sang the lead on both "The Last Morning", the movie's theme song, later re-recorded for their second album, Sloppy Seconds, and "Bunky and Lucille", which the band can be seen performing in the film. Haffkine felt that the film would not be a great box office hit but the soundtrack had a lot of momentum so he arranged a meeting with Clive Davis, CBS Records described in Davis's autobiography. Drummer David used a wastepaper basket to keep the beat, and while Sawyer, Locorriere and Cummings played and sang a few songs, Francis hopped up and danced on the mogul's desk. This meeting secured the band their first record contract. The film, released in 1971 by National General Pictures, received mixed critical reviews and did only modestly at the box office, but later became a cult film.

== Ned Kelly ==
The second film was Ned Kelly a movie about an Australian outlaw, featuring Mick Jagger. He produced the soundtrack of the 1970 film featuring Silverstein songs performed by Waylon Jennings, and Kris Kristofferson.

== 1971 Dr. Hook / "Sylvia's Mother" release ==
Silverstein and Dr. Hook & the Medicine Show became a great combination. Haffkine having a knack for picking great songs, quickly became Dr. Hook's #1 A&R man, as well as their producer and manager. Silverstein wrote all the songs for their self-titled debut album, released in 1971, Doctor Hook featured lead vocals, guitar, bass and harmonica by Locorriere, guitarist Cummings, singer Sawyer, drummer David, singer/guitarist, and keyboard player Billy Francis. The album included their first hit, "Sylvia's Mother". "Sylvia's Mother", a subtle parody of teen-heartbreak weepers, flopped on first release, but with some more promotional muscle became the band's first million-seller and hit the Top Five in the summer of 1972. Other titles on the album included "Marie Lavaux", "Sing Me a Rainbow", "Hey Lady Godiva", "Four Years Older Than Me", "Kiss It Away", "Makin' It Natural", "I Call That True Love", "When She Cries", "Judy", "Mama, I'll Sing One Song for You". It has been released 20 times in the US, UK, Netherlands, Italy, Yugoslavia, Canada, Europe, Spain and Greece.

== Sloppy Seconds ==
Silverstein continued to write songs for Dr. Hook including their entire second album, Sloppy Seconds, now released 16 times in the US, Australia, UK, Netherlands, Europe and Canada. It featured some of their most popular songs, including "Freakin' at the Freaker's Ball", and "The Cover of the Rolling Stone." Other titles on the album were "If I'd Only Come and Gone", "The Things I Didn't Say", "Carry Me Carrie", "Get My Rocks Off", "Last Mornin'", "I Can't Touch the Sun", "Queen of the Silver Dollar", "Turn On the World", "Stayin' Song". The album was listed in the Billboard 200 in 1973.

== "The Cover of the Rolling Stone" ==
Haffkine locked horns again with Clive Davis for 3 months over Silverstein's "Cover of the Rolling Stone" because of the lyrics "We take all kinds of pills to get all kinds of thrills" and "I got a freaky old lady named Cocaine Katy". Ron thought that If they put out another 'Sylvia's Mother'... Dr. Hook would be finished. Clive told the label to release it. Ron, against all opinions asked that nothing else be done to the song stating, "it's perfect just the way it is". "The Cover of the Rolling Stone" was not their biggest hit, but it turned out to be the most significant song of Dr. Hook's career.

On the heels of the successful record Haffkine visited Jann Wenner, one of the founders of Rolling Stone Magazine, proclaiming "I've just given you guys the best commercial for this rag that you'll ever get" in the hopes they would secure an interview with the magazine. They did and the Rolling Stone sent Cameron Crowe who later wrote and directed "Jerry McGuire" to do the interview, who at the time was their 16 yr. old wiz-kid reporter, and in March, 1973, issue 131, Dr. Hook and the Medicine Show appeared on the cover of Rolling Stone.

Even with the success of "the Cover of the Rolling Stone" the BBC Radio network refused to play it as it violated their advertising a trademark name rules, (the Kinks had to change "Coca-Cola" to "Cherry Cola" in their song "Lola" to get around the rule). CBS Records responded by setting up a phone line that would play the song to anyone willing to dial in, which helped build the buzz. The BBC was only able to play the song after some of their DJs edited themselves shouting the words "Radio Times" over "Rolling Stone" (Radio Times was a show on the BBC).

== 1973: Belly Up ==
In 1973 all was not well for Haffkine and Dr. Hook & The Medicine Show. David left the band and was replaced by John Wolters. The group had a difficult time meeting the high expectations created by Sloppy Seconds, and the result was Belly Up, which Huey noted "was unfortunately prophetic." Belly Up included "Acapulco Goldie", "Penicillin Penny", "Life Ain't Easy", "When Lily Was Queen", "Monterey Jack", "You Ain't Got the Right", "Put a Little Bit On Me", "Ballad Of....", "Roland the Roadie Gertrude the Groupie", "Come On In", and "The Wonderful Soup Stone". The album was sold in the US, UK, Europe and Canada. Dr. Hook was just as famed for their crazed stage antics, which ranged from surreal banter to impersonating their own opening acts, but it was the group's nonchalance about business matters that led to bankruptcy."If we were in the black when we finished a tour, we'd party into the red," says Locorriere. They were forced to file bankruptcy in 1974, although they continued to tour incessantly.

== 1973–1974: Olivia Newton-John ==
From 1973 to 1974 Haffkine, Ray Sawyer and Dennis Locorriere of Dr. Hook & the Medicine Show composed "You Ain't Got the Right" for Olivia Newton-John on her Crystal Lady and If You Love Me, Let Me Know albums. If You Love Me, Let Me Know in 1974 was on the Billboard 200 at #1 and Billboard Top Country Albums at #1.

== 1975: Move to Nashville ==
At the time, in Nashville, Kyle Lehning, now famous for his body of work with Randy Travis was producing Waylon Jennings and wanted to meet Ron's engineer, Roy Halee. Kyle knew Shel Silverstein, so he got Shel to introduce him to Ron, and Ron in turn introduced Kyle to Roy. When they met, Kyle said to Ron; "Why don't you make a record in Nashville?" Ron said: "I' don't know how to make a record with studio musicians". So Kyle hired the musicians and showed Ron how sessions were done in Nashville.

== 1975: Dr. Hook signs with Capitol ==
The band shortened its name to Dr. Hook in 1975. They signed with Capitol in 1975 with the aptly titled album Bankrupt. Unlike previous projects, this album included original material written by the group. The hit from the project was a reworked version of Sam Cooke's "Only Sixteen", revitalizing their career and charted in the top ten in 1976. When Haffkine found a little tune called "A Little Bit More", written and originally performed by Bobby Gosh, on a vinyl record, released on his 1973 album Sitting in the Quiet at a flea market for 35 cents in San Francisco, things exploded for Dr. Hook. It charted at number 11 on the US Billboard Hot 100, and spent two weeks at number nine on the Cash Box Top 100. It reached number two on the UK Singles Chart. It was Dr. Hook's joint second-best UK chart placing, matching "Sylvia's Mother" and surpassed only by "When You're in Love with a Beautiful Woman" when it reached number 1 for several weeks in 1979 in the UK. A number of great certified million sellers came next with "Sharing the Night Together" reaching number 6, "Sexy Eyes" reaching number 5, "A Little Bit More" reached number 11 and "Better Love Next Time" reached number 12.

== 1978: Songs & Stories – Shel Silverstein ==
Together Haffkine and Silverstein produced a collection of scatological renaissance style poetry and satire onto vinyl, six years after its predecessor, Freakin' at the Freakers Ball (1972). The record's adult content aptly demonstrated one of Silverstein's most distinguishing lyrical motifs when dealing with controversial material. The album titles tackle a myriad of social taboos, including homosexual incest ("Father of a Boy Named Sue"), prolific marijuana ("The Smoke Off") and cocaine ("They Held Me Down") use, and even an interspecies love song ("The Cat and the Rat"). Silverstein occasionally accompanies himself on acoustic guitar, with an undeniable quirky melodic style. In 2002, Songs & Stories was issued on CD by laugh.com.

== 1979: Pleasure & Pain ==
Pleasure & Pain, released in 1979, was Dr. Hook's first gold album. According to Steve Huey, of All Music Guide, it solidified their reputation as "disco-tinged balladeers." Bob "Willard" Henke joined the band while Elswit took a year off to recover from cancer. But Sawyer was increasingly upset at the commercial direction the group's sound was taking, and left the band in 1980. Henke left soon after to be replaced with Rod Smarr. The band changed labels again, but could not replicate earlier successes, and officially disbanded in 1985.

== Keith Stegall and Sexy Eyes ==
While at Sound Lab with Dr. Hook in 1979, Steagall came in with ‘Sexy Eyes' and played it for Ron. Ron loved it, but said " there's a weak line, fix the line and bring it back". Stegall fixed the line and brought it back. Ron asked, "You ever had a hit before?". Stegall replied "no". Haffkine replies "well you're about to".

"Sexy Eyes" written by Chris Waters, Bob Mather and Keith Stegall, was recorded and released as a single by Dr. Hook in early 1980. In the United States, the single reached No. 5 on the Billboard Hot 100 and was certified Gold by the RIAA. It was also a Top 10 hit in Canada (#8) and the United Kingdom (#4).

Keith co-wrote his first hit, Dr. Hooks' 1980 smash "Sexy Eyes" and the flood gates opened to him as a songwriter and eventually a producer.

== 1980: Helen Reddy ==
In 1980 Haffkine produced Helen Reddy. The songs produced were A Way With The Ladies, All I Really Need Is You, Killer Barracuda, Last Of The Lovers, Love's Not The Question, Midnight Sunshine, Take What You Find, That Plane, The One I Sing My Love Songs To, Wizard In The Wind and released by Capitol.

== 1983: Lou Rawls ==
In 1983 Haffkine produced Lou Rawls on the first version of Wind Beneath My Wings, a song made famous by Bette Midler. Other songs produced for this album were A Couple More Years, I Been Him, If You're Gonna Love Me, Midnight Sunshine, That's When The Magic Begins, The One I Sign My Love Songs To, Upside Down, When The Night Comes, You Can't Take It With You.

== 1983: Where the Sidewalk Ends ==
Haffkine and Silverstein released "Where the Sidewalk Ends" on cassette in 1983, as an LP phonograph record in 1984, and won the 1984 Grammy Award for Best Recording For Children. The copyright is owned by Sony Music Entertainment Inc. The collection is recited, sung and shouted by Shel Silverstein himself and produced by Ron Haffkine. Shel performed it at the 1984 Grammy Awards.

→The following poems can be heard in the album:

Side A

- Invitation
- Eighteen Flavors-A person labels all the flavors on their ice cream cone before accidentally dropping them all.
- Melinda Mae-A girl tries to eat an entire whale, and actually does so and finishes in eighty years.
- Sick-A girl gives excuses not to go to school.
- Ickle Me, Pickle Me, Tickle Me Too-Three brothers go for a ride in a giant flying shoe.
- Enter This Deserted House
- Jimmy Jet and His TV Set-A boy accidentally watches too much TV, therefore, he is turned into a TV.
- For Sale-Someone tries to sell their little sister, whom they think is quite annoying.
- Warning-Why people shouldn't pick their noses.
- The Yipiyuk-A creature bites on a man's foot and refuses to let go.
- Crocodile's Toothache-A crocodile does not like it when a dentist fools around with his teeth.
- Stone Telling
- Ridiculous Rose-A girl misunderstands what her mother says.
- Boa Constrictor-A man suffers being eaten by a snake.
- Peanut–Butter Sandwich-A king loves peanut butter sandwiches, but when he eats an extra sticky one, the peanut butter causes trouble.
- Listen to the Mustn'ts-A mother tells her child why they should listen to what they're not supposed to do.
- I will not hatch-A baby chick refuses to hatch from its egg.

Side B

- Hug o' War-A kid plays a game that includes hugging.
- Smart
- Forgotten Language
- The Farmer and the Queen-A farmer wants to impress a queen, so he asks his animals for suggestions.
- The One Who Stayed
- No Difference
- Wild Boar
- Thumbs
- Sarah Cynthia Silvia Stout Would Not Take The Garbage Out-A girl refuses take out the garbage, which causes trouble for the whole world.
- My Hobby
- Early Bird
- Me–Stew-When a cook runs out of food for a stew, he decides to make one out of himself.
- Captain Hook-A story about the legendary pirate, Captain Hook.
- With His Mouth Full of Food
- The Flying Festoon
- The Silver Fish
- The Generals
- The Worst
- My Beard-A man grows a beard that's so long that he runs naked down the street.
- Merry...-A family sets up Christmas at the wrong period of time.
- The Search

Silverstein, Shel. Where the Sidewalk Ends. 30. New York: Scholastic, 2005. 1-187.

=== Production ===
- Producer & Director: Ron Haffkine, Keith Cozart
- Engineer: jb & Danny Mundhenk & Oliver Masciarotte
- Mastering: Denny Purcell

Recorded at Bullet Recording, Nashville, Blank Tapes, New York, and in Studio D at Criteria Recording in Miami, Florida.

== 1984–1985: A Light in the Attic and Shel Audio ==
In 1985 Haffkine, producer and Silverstein, writer went on to release A Light in the Attic. Here are some songs that they released between 1984 and 1985; A Light In The Attic, Almost Perfect, Anteater, Ations, Backward Bill, Bear In There, Captain Blackbeard Did What, Clarence, Crowded Tub, Eight Balloons, Eighteen Flavors, Enter This Deserted House, Examination, Fancy Dive, For Sale, Forgotten Language, Friendship, God's Wheel, Hitting, Homework Machine, How Not To Have To Dry The Dishes, Hug O' War, Hula Eel, Ickle Me, Pickle Me, Tickle Me Too, Invitation, Jimmy Jet And His TV Set, Kidnapped, Ladies First, Listen To The Mustn'ts, Little Abigail And The Beautiful Pony, Melinda Mae, Me-Stew, Monsters I've Met, My Beard, My Hobby, No Difference, Nobody, Outside Or Underneath, Peckin', Picture Puzzle Piece, Prehistoric, Quick Trip, Ridiculous Rose, Rock And Roll Band, Sick, Signals, Smart, Squishy Touch, Stone Telling, The Dragon Of Grindly Grun, The Farmer And The Queen, The Flying Festoon, The Generals, The Little Boy And The Old Man, The One Who Stayed, The Silver Fish, The Sitter, The Toad And The Kangaroo, The Worst, The Yipiyuk, Thumbs, Tryin' On Clothes, Twistable, Turnable Man, Warning, Whatif, Wild Boar, With His Mouth Full Of Food, Zebra Question.

== 1991: Davis Daniel ==
Davis Daniel landed a record deal with Polygram Records in 1991 with the help of his music producer Ron Haffkine. Haffkine found Daniel driving a beer truck in Nashville, TN and produced his debut album. People magazine named it the Best Album of the Year, Top 15 in all classes of music and that it delivered a masterpiece cover of the Elvis song, ‘Love me'.

Fighting Fire with Fire, was issued that year. It produced four singles on the country charts: "Picture Me" at number 28, followed by "For Crying Out Loud" at number 13, the title track at number 27 and "Still Got a Crush on You" at number 48. Alanna Nash of Entertainment Weekly gave the album a B rating, comparing Daniel's vocal technique to that of Keith Whitley and saying that he showed promise in carrying on in Whitley's tradition.

== Later career ==
Just before the COVID-19 pandemic in 2020, Haffkine and his wife, Sydney, retired and moved to Mexico. Haffkine produced 10 studio albums and 2 live albums on Dr. Hook, which garnered 10 top tens on the pop charts in the US and 67 gold and platinum awards worldwide. To date his albums have been turned into greatest hits compilations 9 times from 1976 to 2014. To music historians, it's no secret that at least two of Ron's albums are ranked and archived, as the best music produced in the Seventies. He came out of retirement to help develop a new duo Dawn and Nash from 2013 to 2018, formerly known as "Tawny River". In later life he continued to mentor young new producers looking to make a name in the music industry.

== Death ==
Haffkine died from leukemia and kidney failure at his home in Mexico, on October 1, 2023, at the age of 84.

== Awards ==
Together with longtime friend and writer Shel Silverstein, Haffkine produced and released "Where the Sidewalk Ends" on cassette in 1983, as an LP phonograph record in 1984, winning the 1984 Grammy Award for Best Recording for Children.

== Discography ==
All Music Guide Australian Charts

=== Studio and live albums ===
Year	Album	Peak chart positions				
Year	Album	US	US Country	CAN	UK	DEN
1968	The Good Rats	—	—	—	—	—
1970	Ned Kelly (soundtrack)	—	—	—	—	—
1971	Doctor Hook & The Medicine Show (reissued as Sylvia's Mother)	45	—	38	—	5
1972	Dr. Hook & the Medicine Show	—	—	—	—	—
1972	Sloppy Seconds	41	—	16	—	—
1973	Belly Up!	141	—	—	—	7
1974	Joanne Glasscock	—	—	—	—	—
1975	Bankrupt	141	—	—	—	2
1976	A Little Bit More — Dr. Hook & the Medicine Show	62	18	69	5	1
1976	Where the Sidewalk Ends	—	—	—	—	—
1977	Makin' Love and Music	—	—	—	39	—
1978	Pleasure and Pain	66	17	93	47	—
1978	Songs and Stories — Shel Silverstein	—	—	—	—	—
1979	Sometimes You Win	71	—	59	14	—
1980	Rising	175	—	—	44	—
1981	Live in the U.K. (US title: Dr. Hook Live)	—	—	—	90	—
1982	Players in the Dark	118	—	—	—	—
1983	Let Me Drink From Your Well	—	—	—	—	—
1985	A Light in the Attic — Shel Silverstein	—	—	—	—	—
1985	Where The Sidewalk Ends — Shel Silverstein; Grammy Award for Best Album for Children	—	—	—	—	—
1994	Suddenly — The Cherry People	—	—	—	—	—
1995	The Heritage/Clossus Story	—	—	—	—	—
1996	Pleasure and Pain:The History of Dr. Hook — Dr. Hook & the Medicine Show	—	—	—	—	—
1996	Keep the Change — Eric Hamilton Band	—	—	—	—	—
1999	The Journey: Six Strings Away — Waylon Jennings	—	—	—	—	—
2001	RCA Country Legends — Waylon Jennings	—	—	—	—	—
2001	The Gurus Are Hear! The Gurus Original Recording Producer — The Gurus	—	—	—	—	—
2004	Cherrystones: Hidden Charms — David Holmes	—	—	—	—	—
2005	Live: One Night Only — Dr. Hook & the Medicine Show	—	—	—	—	—
2005	Love Songs — Waylon Jennings	—	—	—	—	—
2007	Unique Voice of Dr. Hook — Dennis Locorriere	—	—	—	—	—
2009	Tiswas Album	—	—	—	—	—
2013	Rising Players in the Dark — Dr. Hook & the Medicine Show	—	—	—	—	—
2015	Love Songs - Jackie	—	—	—	—	—

=== Compilation albums ===
Year	Album	Peak chart positions			
Year	Album	US	AUS	CAN	UK
1976	The Best of Dr. Hook (a.k.a. Revisited)	—	—	—	—
1978	Remedies - Dr. Hook	—	—	—	—
1980	Greatest Hits	142	—	32	2
1984	The Very Best of Dr. Hook	—	—	—	—
1987	Greatest Hits (And More)	—	2	—	—
1988	Love Songs (Dr. Hook album)	—	—	—	—
1989	Sharing The Night Together And Other Favorites By Dr. Hook (Dr. Hook album)	—	—	—	—
1992	Completely Hooked - The Best of Dr. Hook	—	2	—	3
1995	Dr. Hook and the Medicine Show - Greatest Hits	—	—	—	—
1996	Sharing the Night Together - The Best Of Dr. Hook	—	—	—	—
1996	Super Hits - Waylon Jennings	—	—	—	—
1998	Sunshine Days, Vol. 5: 60's Pop Classics	—	—	—	—
1999	Love Songs	—	—	—	8
2001	Super Hits Making Love & Music: The 1976-1979 Recordings Dr. Hook	—	—	—	—
2003	I Got Stoned and I Missed It: The Best from Shel Silverstein Dr. Hook	—	—	—	—
2003	The Definitive Collection Dr. Hook	—	29	—	—
2005	The Best of Shel Silverstein: His Words His Songs His Friends	—	—	—	—
2005	The Kings and Queens of Country [Sony]	—	—	—	—
2006	Nashville Rebel [Box Set] Waylon Jennings	—	—	—	—
2007	Hits and History	—	—	—	14
2007	The Essential Waylon Jennings [RCA Nashville/Legacy]	—	—	—	—
2007	Greatest Hooks	—	—	—	—
2007	Makin' Love & Music/Pleasure and Pain Dr. Hook	—	—	—	—
2007	Super Hits with Waylon Jennings	—	—	—	—
2009	Pleasure & Pain/Sometimes You Win Dr. Hook	—	—	—	—
2009	The Music of Waylon Jennings	—	—	—	—
2010	Bankrupt/A Little Bit More	—	—	—	—
2010	Love Songs Jackie	—	—	—	—
2011	Makin' Love and Music/Live in the UK"	—	—	—	—
2012	Playlist: The Very Best of Dr. Hook & the Medicine Show "	—	—	—	—
2013	All the Best " Dr. Hook	—	—	—	—
2014	A Little Bit More: The Collection" Dr. Hook	—	—	—	—
2014	Icon" Dr. Hook	—	—	—	—
2014	The Box Set Series Waylon Jennings	—	—	—	—
2014	The Essential Dr. Hook & The Medicine Show	—	—	—	—
2014	Timeless	—	36	—	9

=== Singles ===
Year	Single	Peak chart positions																Album Notes	
Year	Single	US	US Country	US AC	AUS	CAN	CAN Country	CAN AC	UK	CH	DE	AT	NO	NZ	BE	NL	SE	Album Notes	
1968	"Suddenly"	44	—	—	—	—	—	—	—	—	—	—	—	—	—	—	—	ARTIST: The Cherry People	
1971	"Last Morning"	—	—	—	—	—	—	—	—	—	—	—	—	—	—	—	—	Who Is Harry Kellerman And Why Is He Saying Those Terrible Things About Me?	
1972	"Sylvia's Mother"	5	—	—	1	2	—	—	2	3	9	—	5	1	14	3	—	Doctor Hook	
1972	"Carry Me Carrie"	71	—	—	—	82	—	—	—	—	29	—	—	—	—	21	—	Sloppy Seconds	
1972	"The Cover of Rolling Stone"	6	—	—	32	2	—	—	—	—	—	—	—	—	—	13	—	Sloppy Seconds	
1973	"Roland the Roadie and Gertrude the Groupie"	83	—	—	—	74	—	—	—	—	—	—	—	—	—	18	—	Belly Up! ARTIST: DR HOOK	
1973	"Life Ain't Easy"	68	—	—	—	—	—	—	—	—	—	—	—	—	—	—	—	Belly Up! ARTIST: DR HOOK	
1974	"Cops And Robbers"	—	—	—	—	—	—	—	—	—	—	—	—	—	—	—	—	Singles Only ARTIST: Dr. Hook	
1974	"The Ballad of Lucy Jordan"	—	—	—	—	—	—	—	—	—	—	—	—	—	—	—	—	Singles Only ARTIST: Dr. Hook	
1975	"The Stimu Dr. Hook"	—	—	—	—	—	—	—	—	—	—	—	—	—	—	—	—	Promo Only	
1975	"The Millionaire"	95	—	—	8	—	—	—	—	—	—	—	—	—	—	—	—	Bankrupt ARTIST = Dr. Hook	
1975	"Only Sixteen"	6	55	14	8	3	—	9	—	—	—	—	9	9	—	—	—	Bankrupt ARTIST = Dr. Hook	
1976	"A Little Bit More"	11	—	15	10	4	7	42	2	13	1	30	10	10	—	—	—	A Little Bit More ARTIST: Dr. Hook	
1976	"A Couple More Years"	—	51	—	—	—	—	—	—	—	—	—	—	—	—	—	—	A Little Bit More ARTIST: Dr. Hook	—
1976	"If Not You"	55	26	21	69	56	—	9	5	—	—	—	—	—	—	—	—	A Little Bit More ARTIST: Dr. Hook	—
1977	"Walk Right In"	46	92	39	1	77	—	30	—	—	—	—	4	11	—	—	11	Makin' Love and Music ARTIST: Dr. Hook	
1978	"More Like the Movies"	—	—	—	93	—	—	—	14	—	—	—	—	—	—	—	—	A Little Bit More ARTIST: Dr. Hook	
1978	"Sharing the Night Together"	6	50	18	10	3	40	4	43	—	—	—	—	12	—	28	—	Pleasure and Pain ARTIST: Dr. Hook	
1979	"All the Time in the World"	54	82	41	—	60	64	12	—	—	—	—	—	—	—	—	—	Pleasure and Pain ARTIST: Dr. Hook	
1979	"When You're in Love with a Beautiful Woman"	6	68	5	20	4	22	7	1	8	14	—	2	2	3	—		Pleasure and Pain ARTIST: Dr. Hook	
1979	"In Over My Head"	—	—	—	—	—	—	—	—	44	—	—	—	—	—	—			
1979	"What Do You Want"	—	—	—	—	—	—	—	—	—	—	—	—	—	42	—			
1979	"Better Love Next Time"	12	91	3	24	39	—	10	8	—	33	—	—	7	—	—	—	Sometimes You Win ARTIST: Dr. Hook	
1980	"Sexy Eyes" (Note: Sexy Eyes also reached number one in New Zealand.)	5	—	6	41	8	—	1	4	6	2	11	8	1	—	—		Sometimes You Win ARTIST: Dr. Hook	
1980	"Years From Now"	51	—	17	72	63	—	3	47	—	—	—	—	—	—	—	—		
1980	"Girls Can Get It"	34	—	—	3	—	—	—	40	—	44	—	—	5	—	—	—	Rising	
1980	"Body Talkin"	—	—	—	—	—	—	—	—	—	—	—	—	36	—	—	—	Rising	
1981	"That Didn't Hurt Too Bad"	69	—	—	—	—	—	—	—	—	—	—	—	—	—	—	—		
1981	"The Wild Colonial Boy"	—	—	—	4	—	—	—	—	—	—	—	—	—	—	—	—	Single Only (Note: The Wild Colonial Boy was included on some Australian copies of Rising.)	
1982	"Baby Makes Her Blue Jeans Talk" (Note: Baby Makes her Blue Jeans Talk made number one in South Africa.)	25	—	—	11	17	—	—	—	—	64	—	—	4	2	2	—	Players in the Dark ARTIST: Dr. Hook	
1982	"Loveline"	60	—	19	—	—	—	—	—	—	—	—	—	—	—	—	—	Players in the Dark ARTIST: Dr. Hook	
1983	"When the Night Comes"	—	—	—	—	—	—	—	—	—	—	—	—	—	—	—	—	ARTIST: Lou Rawls	
1989	"Missing You"	—	—	—	—	—	—	—	—	—	—	—	—	—	—	—	—	ARTIST: The Marcy Brothers	
1991	"Fighting Fire With Fire"	—	—	—	—	—	—	—	—	—	—	—	—	—	—	—	—	ARTIST: Davis Daniel	
1996	One Night in Bangkok	—	—	—	—	—	—	—	—	—	—	—	—	—	—	—	—	ARTIST: Robey	

=== Composer ===
Year	Album - Artist	Peak chart positions			
Year	Album - Artist	US	AUS	CAN	UK
1973	Let Me Be There - Olivia Newton-John	6	11	2	—
1974	If You Love Me, Let Me Know - Olivia Newton-John	—	—	—	—
1974	Crystal Lady - Olivia Newton-John	—	—	—	—
1975	Ballad of Lucy Jordan - Dr. Hook	—	—	—	—
1976	A Little Bit More - Dr. Hook	—	—	—	—
1977	Sylvia's Mother - Dr. Hook	—	—	—	—
