= The Cover of "Rolling Stone" =

1972 single by Dr. Hook & the Medicine Show

"The Cover of 'Rolling Stone'"

Single by Dr. Hook & the Medicine Show

from the album Sloppy Seconds
- B-side: "Queen of the Silver Dollar"
- Released: October 26, 1972
- Recorded: 1972
- Genre: Pop rock, country rock, comedy
- Length: 2:53
- Label: Columbia
- Songwriter: Shel Silverstein
- Producer: Ron Haffkine

Dr. Hook & the Medicine Show singles chronology
"Carry Me, Carrie" (1972)	"The Cover of 'Rolling Stone'" (1972)	"Roland the Roadie and Gertrude the Groupie" (1973)

"The Cover of "Rolling Stone"" is a song written by Shel Silverstein and first recorded by American rock group Dr. Hook & the Medicine Show. Produced by Ron Haffkine and released in 1972, it was the band's third single and peaked at No. 6 on the U.S. pop chart for two weeks on March 17–24, 1973. The song satirically laments that the band had not appeared on the cover of Rolling Stone, a magazine that focuses on music, politics, and popular culture. The song's success led to the band appearing on the cover of the March 1973 issue of Rolling Stone, albeit in caricature.

== History and description ==
From left to right: Dennis Locorriere, Billy Francis, and Ray Sawyer of Dr. Hook & the Medicine Show on the March 29, 1973, cover of Rolling Stone in caricature

The song satirizes success in the music business; the narrator laments that his band, despite having the superficial attributes of successful rock stars (including drug use, "teenage groupies, who'll do anything we say", and a frenetic guitar solo) has been unable to "get our picture on the cover of the Rolling Stone."

As the song was riding high on the charts, the magazine finally acquiesced to Dr. Hook's request—after a fashion: the March 29, 1973, cover of Rolling Stone did indeed feature the band, but in caricature form rather than a photograph and with only three of the band's seven members. Also, the group's name was not used; instead the caption read simply, "What's-Their-Names Make the Cover".

BBC Radio refused to play the song, as it contained the name of a commercial publication (Rolling Stone) and could therefore be considered advertising. An urban legend states that the song was re-recorded by the band as "The Cover of the Radio Times", the weekly television and radio guide published by the BBC. However, this is disputed by Dennis Locorriere, Dr. Hook's co-lead singer, who said: "What actually happened was that a bunch of BBC disc jockeys went into a studio and shouted 'RADIO TIMES' over our original chorus." He noted that it was the same recording as originally released, but with the additional layer of voices. The new version was rush-released in the UK but did not reach the charts. However, the band's UK publicists took advantage of the BBC's attitude by advertising the single in the UK music press as "the first banned single of 1973".

== Chart performance ==
=== Weekly charts ===
Chart (1972–1973)	Peak position
Australia (Kent Music Report)	32
Canada RPM Top Singles	2
Netherlands (Single Top 100)	13
New Zealand (Listener)	3
US Billboard Hot 100	6
US Cash Box Top 100	5

=== Year-end charts ===
Chart (1973)	Rank
Canada RPM Top Singles	29
U.S. Billboard Hot 100	51
U.S. Cash Box	47

== Certifications ==
Region	Certification	Certified units/sales
New Zealand (RMNZ)	Platinum	30,000^{‡}
United States (RIAA)	Gold	1,000,000^{^}
^{^} Shipments figures based on certification alone.^{‡} Sales+streaming figures based on certification alone.

== Cover versions ==
The song has been covered by various artists, including R. Stevie Moore on his 1987 album Teenage Spectacular; Poison on their 2000 album Crack a Smile... and More!; Sammy Kershaw on his 2010 album Better Than I Used to Be, with his version featuring Jamey Johnson; Black Francis on the album Twistable, Turnable Man: A Musical Tribute to the Songs of Shel Silverstein in 2010; and Jackyl on their 2012 album Best in Show. Canadian singer Corb Lund featured the song on his 2019 EP Cover Your Tracks in a duet with Hayes Carll.

Buck Owens and the Buckaroos parodied the song as "On the Cover of the Music City News" on the 1974 album It's a Monster's Holiday and the 1976 album Best of Buck Owens, Volume 6.

German comedian Mike Krüger covered and translated the song with small lyrical changes for his 1978 album Stau mal wieder, changing the title to "Auf der Hülle mit den Rolling Stones" ("On the Cover with the Rolling Stones"), lyrics implying he would like to have his photograph as an album cover for the Rolling Stones.

In 1987, Dutch band Bertus Staigerpaip released a parody: "De veurplaat van d'n Donald Duck" ("The cover of the Donald Duck Weekblad" – a Dutch comic magazine).

Phish covered the song at the Great Western Forum in Inglewood, California, on February 14, 2003. The performance foreshadowed their actual appearance on the cover of Rolling Stone’s March 3, 2003, issue.

In 1999 and 2000, radio talk show host Mike Church recorded two parody versions of the song, both titled "See A Right Winger Get Stoned". The song was played on radio station WVNN in Huntsville, Alabama, before Church made his way to Sirius Satellite and then SiriusXM Satellite Radio where he played the song for 15 years. Church included both versions on his 2013 greatest hits album.

The Showbiz Pizza animatronic band The Rock-afire Explosion recorded a cover for their “Country II” showtape however it didn’t make the final tape and was left as a demo.

== In popular culture ==
The song was sung by characters in the 2000 film Almost Famous.

== See also ==
- Country rock
- Lists of people on the United States cover of Rolling Stone
