= Sylvia's Mother =

1972 single by Dr. Hook & the Medicine Show

Single by Dr. Hook & the Medicine Show

from the album Dr. Hook
- B-side: "Makin' It Natural"
- Released: March 1972
- Genre: Country rock, pop
- Length: 3:50
- Label: Columbia
- Songwriter: Shel Silverstein
- Producer: Ron Haffkine

Dr. Hook & the Medicine Show singles chronology
"Last Morning" (1971)	"Sylvia's Mother" (1972)	"Carry Me, Carrie" (1972)

"Sylvia's Mother" is a 1972 single by Dr. Hook and the Medicine Show, and was the group's first hit song. It was written by Shel Silverstein and produced by Ron Haffkine, and was highly successful in the United States, reaching number five on the Billboard singles chart (tied with "Sexy Eyes" from the album Sometimes You Win for the band's best performing song), as well as number two in the United Kingdom. It spent three weeks at number one on the Australian music charts, making it the 15th-ranked single in Australia for 1972; and also reached number one in South Africa, where it was the third-ranked song for the year, and in New Zealand. The song spent seven consecutive weeks at number one in Ireland on the Irish Singles Chart. It appeared on the group's first album, Doctor Hook.

== Background ==
"Sylvia's Mother" is autobiographical, with songwriter Shel Silverstein drawing upon his unsuccessful attempt to revive a failed relationship. Silverstein had been in love with a woman named Sylvia Maria Pandolfi. She later became engaged to another man and ended up as a museum curator at the Museo de Arte Carrillo Gil in Mexico City. Desperate to continue the relationship, Silverstein called Sylvia's mother, Emma Louisa Pandolfi ("Mrs. Avery" in the song), but she told him the love had ended.

The lead singer, Dennis Locorriere, ended up meeting the real Sylvia many years later. He described the song: "I like the songs which tell stories, like 'The Ballad of Lucy Jordan'. It means I can be more than just a singer, it almost steps into acting. When you're singing 'Sylvia's Mother', you have to be that guy in the phone booth."

Cash Box said "'It ain't easy to render unto Silverstein what is Shel's, but this group knows the secret to Top 40 success on this happy/sad tune, bound to be a huge request and sales item."

== Charts ==
=== Weekly charts ===
Chart (1972)	Peak position
Australia (Kent Music Report)	1
Belgium (Ultratop 50 Flanders)	14
Belgium (Ultratop 50 Wallonia)	38
Canada Top Singles (RPM)	2
Denmark (Denmark Top 10)	3
Ireland (IRMA)	1
Italian Singles Chart	3
Netherlands (Single Top 100)	3
New Zealand (Listener)	1
Norway (VG-lista)	5
South African Singles Chart	1
Swedish Singles Chart	9
Switzerland (Schweizer Hitparade)	3
UK Singles (Official Charts)	2
US Billboard Hot 100	5
US Cash Box Top 100	1
West Germany (GfK)	9

=== Year-end charts ===
Chart (1972)	Rank
Australia (Kent Music Report)	15
Belgium (VRT Top 30)	90
Canada (RPM)	23
Italian Singles Chart	22
Netherlands	33
South African Singles Chart	3
UK	20
US Billboard Hot 100	64
US Cash Box Top 100	65
West Germany (Media Control)	48

== Certifications and sales ==
Region	Certification	Certified units/sales
Ireland	—	50,000
New Zealand (RMNZ)	Platinum	30,000^{‡}
United States (RIAA)	Gold	1,000,000^{^}
^{^} Shipments figures based on certification alone.^{‡} Sales+streaming figures based on certification alone.

== Bobby Bare cover ==
"Sylvia's Mother"

Single by Bobby Bare
- B-side: "Music City U.S.A."
- Released: 1972
- Recorded: June 15, 1972; Mercury Custom Recording Studio; Nashville, Tennessee
- Genre: Country
- Length: 3:52; 3:39 (7" version)
- Label: Mercury 73317
- Songwriter: Shel Silverstein
- Producer: Jerry Kennedy

Bobby Bare singles chronology
"What Am I Gonna Do" (1972)	"Sylvia's Mother" (1972)	"I Hate Goodbyes" (1973)

In 1972, about the same time the Dr. Hook version was on the chart, country singer Bobby Bare recorded a cover version. Bare's version became a hit, reaching No. 12 on the Billboard Hot Country Singles chart that October.
