= George Cummings =

American guitarist and songwriter (1938–2024)

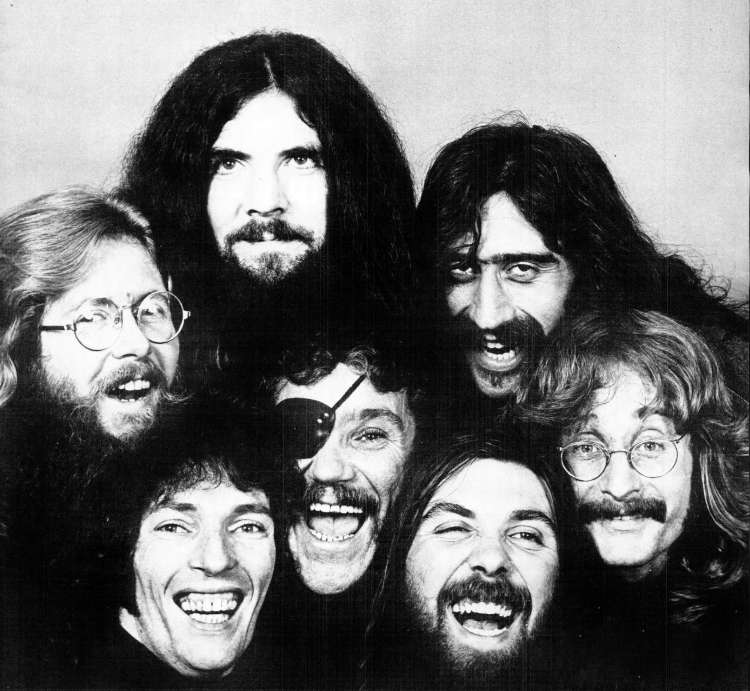
- Cummings (top middle) with Dr. Hook & the Medicine Show in 1972

Background information
- Born: July 28, 1938; Meridian, Mississippi, US
- Died: December 14, 2024 (aged 86) Toms River, New Jersey, US
- Genres: country, rock
- Occupation: Musician
- Instruments: Guitars, vocals
- Years active: 1960s–2024
- Formerly of: Dr. Hook & the Medicine Show

George H. Cummings Jr. (July 28, 1938 – December 14, 2024) was an American guitarist and songwriter based in Bayonne, New Jersey, and in later years, Nashville, Tennessee. He was best known for being the lead guitarist/steel guitarist for Dr. Hook & The Medicine Show from 1968 to 1975.

== Early life ==
Cummings was born in Meridian, Mississippi on July 28, 1938. He had a sister called Barbara, who predeceased him. He was inspired by his father's amateur guitar playing. As a young man, Cummings built speaker cabinets and learned more about electronics after meeting Hartley Peavey, who later founded Peavey Electronics, later saying of this experience "I just helped him glue and screw things together".

He attended Meridian High School, before graduating from Livingston State College with a football scholarship in 1964. He also went to Livingston State with a bachelors. Cummings also served in the United States Marine Corps.

== Career ==
=== The Chocolate Papers ===
Darryl Vincent and the Flares was formed in Meridian, Mississippi in 1956 and Cummings joined the group in 1959. Cummings played in bars from Mississippi to Alabama.

In the 1960s, Cummings was a member of the Chocolate Papers along with Ray Sawyer, Bill Francis, Bobby Dominguez, Popeye Phillips and Jimmy "Wolf Cub" Allen. The Chocolate Papers toured clubs in Mississippi, Alabama and South Carolina, before settling in Biloxi as the house band at the popular 800-seat Gus Stevens Restaurant, the first Gulf Coast supper club to offer upscale entertainment with such headliners as Elvis Presley, Andy Griffith, Mel Tormé, Jayne Mansfield.and Mamie Van Doren. The Chocolate Papers moved to Chicago, but Cummings soon decided to form his own band in the New York area.

=== Dr. Hook & the Medicine Show ===
Cummings found fame with Dr. Hook & the Medicine Show, the group he named and founded in Union City, New Jersey in 1968. He invited former Chocolate Papers bandmates Ray Sawyer, Billy Francis and Popeye Phillips to join his new band. Phillips left to join The Flying Burrito Brothers before the band achieved success, and Francis rejoined Cummings shortly after Locorriere joined. Cummings brought the 19-year-old Dennis Locorriere into the band as a bass player. While playing the Bandbox club in Union City, the owner asked George what the name of his band was, and on the spur of the moment, he wrote down "Dr. Hook & the Medicine Show, Straight from the South, serving up Soul Music".

They recorded their debut album for CBS/Columbia in 1970, and sold a million copies of their single, "Sylvia's Mother," when it was re-released in July, 1972.

Cummings sang the bass-register lead vocal on the second verse of "The Cover of the Rolling Stone", as well as playing the comical lead guitar on the instrumental break in concerts (Locorriere actually played it on the recording). The group was eventually featured on the cover of Rolling Stone magazine, albeit as a drawing and only featuring Locorriere, Sawyer and Francis. He also sang "Makin' It Natural", "Penicillin Penny" (both written by Shel Silverstein) and "I Got Stoned and I Missed It" (co-written by Cummings with Silverstein).

By the mid 1970s, Cummings was frustrated with finances, band members egos and fatigue. After falling seriously ill with bronchitis in 1975, which "almost did me in", Cummings finally left the band in August 1975. Not long before his departure, the band had shortened their name to "Dr. Hook".

According to a 2010 interview, Cummings had fallen out with the other members of Dr. Hook, saying he never received royalties from Dr. Hook, and was upset that Locorriere "wound up owning everything including the name I invented".

=== Later career ===
Cummings formed a new band in New York after leaving Dr. Hook, but had moved to Biloxi, Mississippi by 1977.

In 1978, at the Muscle Shoals Sound Studio, he collaborated with the Delta bluesman Big Joe Williams on one of the singer's last albums The Final Years: Big Joe Williams. Co-produced by Cummings, Joe B. Stewart and Ken Hatley, this album was released in 1993 by Gitanes Jazz/Verve.

In 2003, Cummings worked with Ken Hatley on the soundtrack for Florida City, a film drama about advance knowledge of the Pearl Harbor attack.

In the spring of 2004, the Flares were reborn in Lebanon, Tennessee when Cummings joined original members Jim Pasquale (guitar) and Norman "Knobby" Lowell (drums), along with Nashville singer-songwriters Scotty Cothran, Harold Hutchcraft, Jack Bond and Forest Borders, to cut the comeback album It Is What It Is.

In September 2005, Cummings began recording a solo CD, working with Pasquale and Hutchcraft.

== Death ==
Cummings died at home at Toms River, New Jersey on December 14, 2024, at the age of 86. He was survived by his wife of fifty-one years, Patricia, his sons Justin and Brad, and three grandchildren.
