= When You're in Love with a Beautiful Woman =

Single by Dr. Hook

from the album Pleasure and Pain
- B-side: "Knowing She's There" (US); "Dooley Jones" (Intl.)
- Released: April 4, 1979
- Recorded: 1978
- Genre: Soft rock, disco
- Length: 2:58; 5:15 (extended version)
- Label: Capitol
- Songwriter: Even Stevens
- Producer: Ron Haffkine

Dr. Hook singles chronology
"All the Time in the World" (1979)	"When You're in Love with a Beautiful Woman" (1979)	"Better Love Next Time" (1979)

"When You're in Love with a Beautiful Woman" is a song by Dr. Hook. It was recorded at Muscle Shoals Sound Studio, Alabama.

Written by Even Stevens, who followed producer Ron Haffkine into the studio bathroom to pitch him the song, "When You're in Love with a Beautiful Woman" which first appeared on the band's 1978 album Pleasure and Pain. In 1979 the song belatedly became an international hit, reaching number six on the Billboard Hot 100 singles chart in the USA and number one in the UK Singles Chart in November 1979. It was subsequently added to the band's 1979 album Sometimes You Win non-North American release.

== Chart performance ==
=== Weekly charts ===
Chart (1979)	Peak position
Australia (KMR)	20
Austria (Ö3 Austria Top 40)	14
Belgium (Ultratop 50 Flanders)	2
Canada Top Singles (RPM)	4
Canada Adult Contemporary (RPM)	7
Canada Country Singles (RPM)	22
Euro Hit 50	7
Germany (GfK)	8
Ireland (IRMA)	1
Netherlands (Single Top 100)	3
New Zealand (Recorded Music NZ)	2
Spanish Singles	11
UK Singles Chart	1
US Billboard Hot 100	6
US Billboard Hot Adult Contemporary Tracks	5
US Billboard Hot Country Songs	68

=== Year-end charts ===
Chart (1979)	Rank
Belgian VRT Top 30	24
Canada Top Singles (RPM)	23
Dutch Top 40	14
German Media Control Charts	28
New Zealand	17
UK	5
US Billboard Hot 100	13

== Certifications ==
Region	Certification	Certified units/sales
Canada (Music Canada)	Gold	75,000^{^}
New Zealand (RMNZ)	3× Platinum	90,000^{‡}
United Kingdom (BPI)	Gold	500,000^{^}
United States (RIAA)	Gold	1,000,000^{^}
^{^} Shipments figures based on certification alone.^{‡} Sales+streaming figures based on certification alone.
