= Dr. Hook =

American rock band

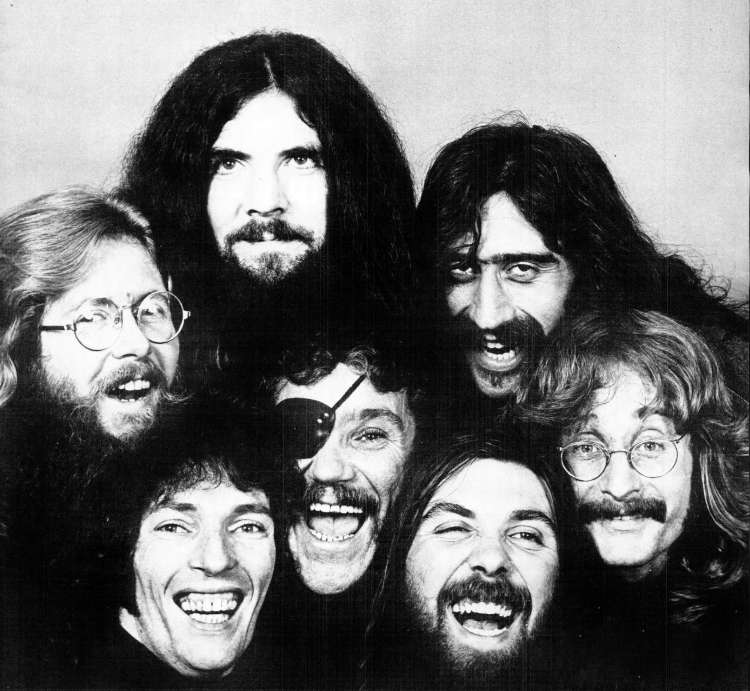
- Dr. Hook in 1972. Clockwise from top: George Cummings, Billy Francis, Rik Elswit, Dennis Locorriere, Ray Sawyer, Jay David, Jance Garfat

Background information
- Also known as: Dr. Hook & the Medicine Show
- Origin: Union City, New Jersey, U.S.
- Genres: Country rock; roots rock; boogie rock; pop rock; soft rock; blue-eyed soul; disco
- Years active: 1968–1985; 1988–2025
- Labels: Columbia; Capitol; CBS; Casablanca
- Past members: Dennis Locorriere; Billy Francis; Ray Sawyer; George Cummings; Jay David; Rik Elswit; Jance Garfat; John Wolters; Bob 'Willard' Henke; Rod Smarr; Walter Hartman; Leonard Wolfe; John Maher; Damien Cooper; Michelle Cordelli; Willie Dowling; Jon Clifford Cox; Accy Yeats; Tim Bye; Jon Poole; Ryan Farmery
- Website: drhookofficial.com

Dr. Hook (known as Dr. Hook & the Medicine Show until 1975) was an American rock band formed in Union City, New Jersey. The band had commercial success in the 1970s with hit singles "Sylvia's Mother" (1972), "The Cover of 'Rolling Stone'" (1973), "Only Sixteen" (1976), "A Little Bit More" (1976), "Walk Right In" (1977), "Sharing the Night Together" (1978), "When You're in Love with a Beautiful Woman" (1979), "Better Love Next Time" (1979), "Sexy Eyes" (1980), and "Baby Makes Her Blue Jeans Talk" (1982). In addition to its own material, Dr. Hook and the Medicine Show performed songs written by the poet Shel Silverstein.

The band had eight years of hits in the United States. Its music, spanning acoustic ballads and soft rock, was played on Top 40, easy listening and country music outlets throughout the English-speaking world.

== History ==
=== Founding of the band: The Chocolate Papers ===
The founding core of the band consisted of George Cummings, Ray Sawyer and Billy Francis, who had first worked together circa 1966 in Mobile, Alabama, in a band called Chocolate Papers. Cummings, Sawyer and Francis started a new band up in Union City, New Jersey, in 1968 and included primary vocalist Dennis Locorriere, who initially joined as a bass player. Other members of the Chocolate Papers included Jimmy Allen, Popeye Phillips, and Bobby Dominguez; according to Locorriere, previous websites incorrectly listed Allen, Phillips and Dominguez as "former members of Dr. Hook", following on with "You can go to websites where they call everybody who was in that band ‘former members of Dr Hook’. But that’s not true. If it was, what about my best friend who lives in San Francisco? Dr Hook didn’t start until Ray and George went up to Union City and met me, then said they knew a keyboard player and sent for Billy. When The Chocolate Papers was happening I was probably 14."

By 1969, the new band was named Dr. Hook and the Medicine Show: Tonic for the Soul. The name, thought up by Cummings, was inspired by Sawyer's eyepatch and a reference to Captain Hook of the Peter Pan fairytale. Sawyer lost his right eye in a near-fatal car crash in Oregon in 1967 and, after that, wore an eyepatch, leading some people to believe that he was Dr. Hook; when asked by fans which band member was Dr. Hook, they would all point to the bus driver.

=== 1968–1971 ===
Popeye Phillips, who had been the drummer in Chocolate Papers, left the band to become a session musician, contributing to the first album by the Flying Burrito Brothers. Drummer Joseph Olivier was the drummer by the time Cummings, Sawyer and Francis had relocated to New Jersey. Just before Dr. Hook began recording its first demos, Olivier was replaced by session drummer Jay David, who became a band member in 1970.

In 1970 the band's demo tapes were heard by Ron Haffkine, musical director on Who Is Harry Kellerman and Why Is He Saying Those Terrible Things About Me?. Haffkine asked the band to record two songs for the film, including "The Last Morning" and "Bunky and Lucille", which the band can be seen performing in the movie. The film helped Dr. Hook and the Medicine Show secure their first recording contract.

In 1971 the group met with Clive Davis of CBS Records. David used a wastebasket in the meeting to keep the beat, and Francis danced on the mogul's desk while Sawyer, Locorriere, and Cummings played and sang. With the CBS Records deal, the band experienced international success with Haffkine as the group's manager and producer.

In 1972 after recording their debut album, the band added a full-time bassist, Jance Garfat, and another guitarist, Rik Elswit.

=== 1972 ===
Haffkine, having a knack for picking songs, quickly became Dr. Hook's No. 1 A&R man and their producer and manager. Shel Silverstein wrote all the songs for their self-titled debut album, released in May 1972. Doctor Hook featured lead vocals, guitar, bass and harmonica by Locorriere, steel guitarist Cummings and singer Sawyer, plus drummer David and keyboard player Billy Francis. The album sold over one million copies and was awarded a gold disc by the RIAA on August 2, 1972. It has been released 20 times in the US, Canada and Europe. The single "Sylvia's Mother", a subtle parody of teen-heartbreak weepers, flopped on first release, but with some more promotional muscle, became the band's first million-seller and hit the top five in the summer of 1972.

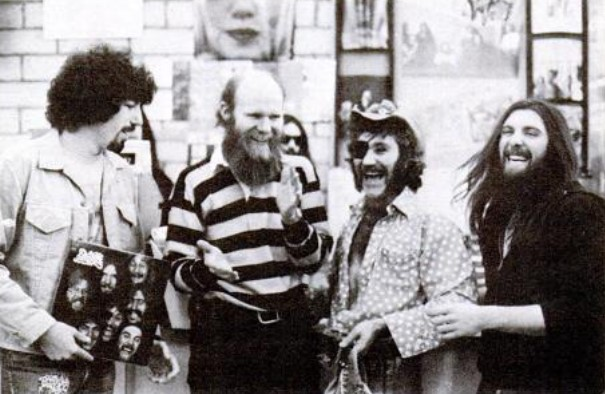
Ray Sawyer (second from right) and Dennis Locorriere (right) with Paul Rappaport, promoter for Columbia Records (left), and Charlie Shaw, a Tower Records employee; Rappaport is seen holding their Sloppy Seconds album.

Silverstein continued to write songs for Dr. Hook, including their entire second album, Sloppy Seconds, released in the US, Australia, Europe and Canada in February 1973. It featured some of their most famous songs, including "Freakin' at the Freaker's Ball" and "The Cover of 'Rolling Stone'". The album was listed in the Billboard 200 in 1973.

After scoring a hit with the song "The Cover of 'Rolling Stone'" in 1973, the band was featured on the cover of the March 29, 1973 Rolling Stone

The band's second single, "The Cover of 'Rolling Stone'" (December 1972), was another million-selling disc in early 1973, poking fun at the idea that a musician had "made it" if they had been pictured on the cover of Rolling Stone magazine. Haffkine visited Jann Wenner, one of the founders of Rolling Stone, proclaiming, "I've just given you guys the best commercial for this rag that you'll ever get." Wenner then sent Cameron Crowe (who later wrote and directed Almost Famous about his time as a music journalist), then 16 years old, to interview the band for issue 131 (March 1973). Dr. Hook and the Medicine Show appeared on the cover, albeit in caricature rather than in a photograph. In the United Kingdom, the BBC Radio network refused to play "The Cover of 'Rolling Stone'", because it considered doing so would be advertising a trademark name. CBS Records responded by setting up a phone line to play the song to anyone willing to dial in, which helped build the buzz. The BBC found itself able to play the song only after some of its DJs edited themselves shouting the words "Radio Times" (a BBC-owned magazine) over "Rolling Stone".

=== 1973–1974 ===
The group had difficulty meeting the high expectations created by Sloppy Seconds and the result was Belly Up! (November 1973), which was unfortunately prophetic. The album was sold in the US, UK, Europe and Canada. Dr. Hook was just as famed for their crazed stage antics, ranging from surreal banter to impersonating their opening acts; the group's disregard for business matters led to bankruptcy. "If we were in the black when we finished a tour, we'd party into the red," says Locorriere. They were forced to file bankruptcy in 1974, although they continued to tour incessantly.

The Medicine Show's lineup changed a few more times over the years. When David left the group in 1973, he was replaced by John Wolters. In 2021, Locorriere said David's departure was because "he got drunk and told us to go fuck ourselves at an airport one day and left us to do four gigs with our drum roadie." The next to depart was founding band member Cummings, who left in August 1975 due to illness, plus personal and musical differences. The band did not replace him. When Elswit was diagnosed with cancer in 1976, the band added Bob "Willard" Henke (formerly of Goose Creek Symphony). Elswit recovered and returned to the lineup, but they kept Henke on for a while.

In 1974 Dr. Hook recorded an album that was to be titled Fried Face; it was not released.

=== 1975–1985 ===
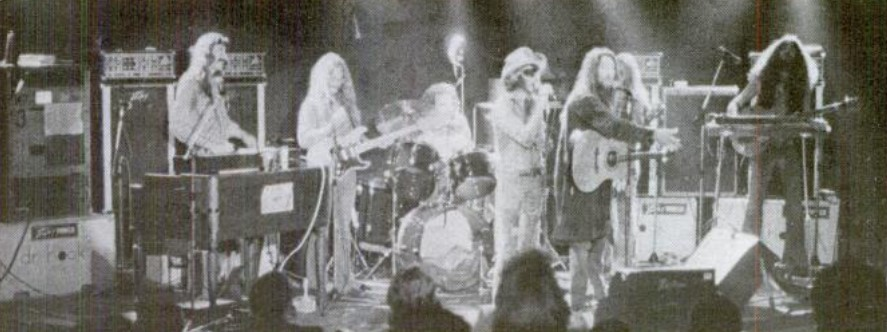
The band live in June 1975. Left to right: Billy Francis, Rik Elswitt, John Wolters, Ray Sawyer, Dennis Locorriere, Jance Garfat, and George Cummings.

The band shortened its name to Dr. Hook in 1975. They signed with Capitol Records in 1975, releasing the aptly titled Bankrupt. Unlike previous projects, this album included original material written by the group. The hit from the project was a reworked version of Sam Cooke's "Only Sixteen" (US number 6), revitalizing their career and charted in the top ten in 1976.

Haffkine discovered a song titled "A Little Bit More", written and originally performed by Bobby Gosh and released on his 1973 album Sitting in the Quiet, on a record he purchased for 35 cents at a flea market in San Francisco. The band recorded and released the song, which reached number 11 on the US Billboard Hot 100 and spent two weeks at number nine on the Cash Box Top 100. It also reached number two on the UK Singles Chart, matching "Sylvia's Mother".

The band followed Bankrupt with 1976's A Little Bit More (named after the hit), which was certified double gold in Australia in November 1976.

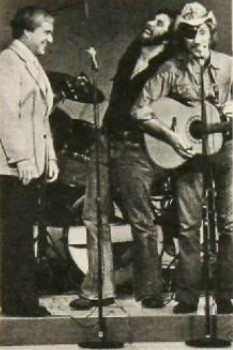
The band performing for Merv Griffin in 1976

This was quickly followed in turn by the 1977 album Making Love And Music which gave them a number 1 hit single in Australia with "Walk Right In", then came Pleasure & Pain (October 1978), which featured "Sharing the Night Together" (US number 6) and "When You're in Love with a Beautiful Woman" (US number 6). Pleasure and Pain was Dr. Hook's first gold album in the US since their debut six years earlier.

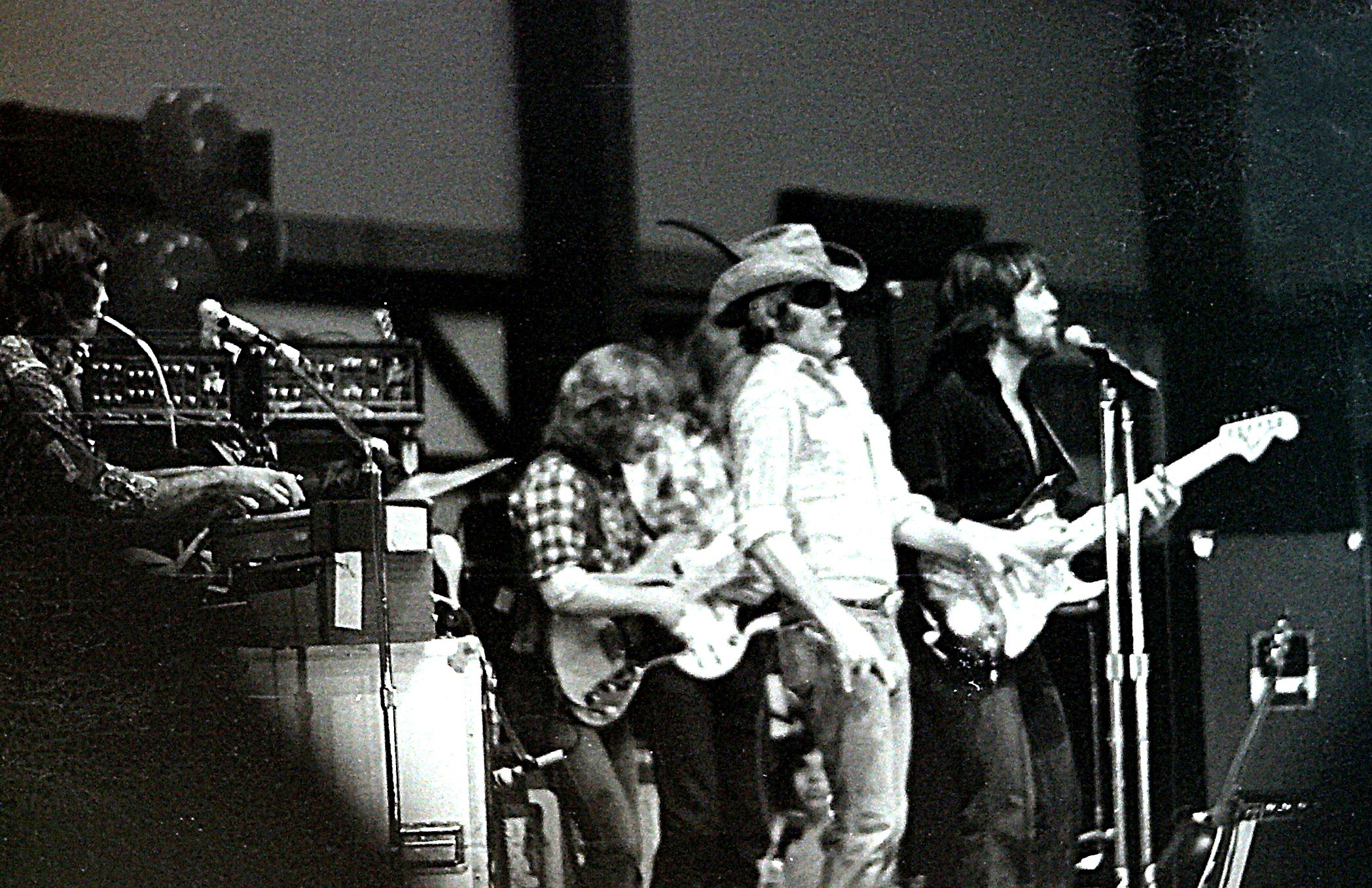
Dr. Hook performing at a telethon in 1977

Sometimes You Win (October 1979) brought forth "Better Love Next Time" (US number 12) in late 1979 and "Sexy Eyes" (US number 5) in 1980. Save for "A Little Bit More" (US number 11), these singles were certified million-sellers. "When You're in Love with a Beautiful Woman" reached number 1 for several weeks in 1979 in the UK. Though the band toured constantly, they had yet to manage to turn their success with singles into album sales.

The band changed labels again to Casablanca Records in 1980, but could not replicate earlier successes. In late 1980, Dr. Hook released "Girls Can Get It" (US number 34) and had their final top 40 hit (which peaked in the US at number 25) with "Baby Makes Her Blue-Jeans Talk" in 1982.

Guitarist Rod Smarr replaced Henke on guitar in 1980, Walter Hartman subbed for Wolters on drums from 1982–1983 and Leonard Wolfe played keyboards alongside Francis in 1983–1985.

Ray Sawyer left in 1983 to pursue a solo career, while the band continued to tour for another couple of years, ending with Dr. Hook's One and Only Farewell Tour in 1985, with Locorriere as the sole frontman.

=== After Dr. Hook: 1985–2025 ===
After Dr. Hook split up, Dennis Locorriere retained ownership of the band's name. However, from 1988 to 2015, Sawyer was granted a license to tour separately as "Ray Sawyer of Dr. Hook" or "Dr. Hook featuring Ray Sawyer" (joined for a time in 2001 by Billy Francis); Sawyer did not perform publicly after his last tour ended in October 2015 and died on December 31, 2018, at the age of 81.

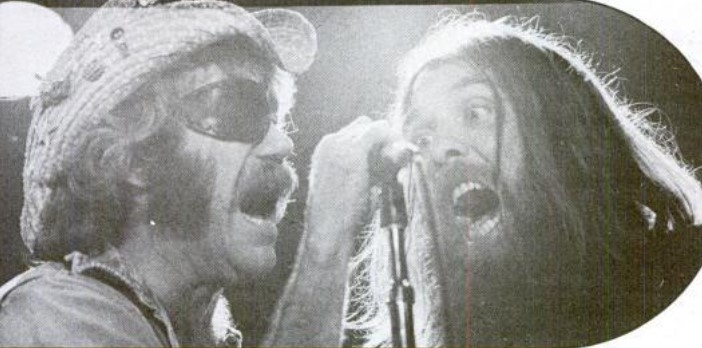
Sawyer and Locorriere in 1975

Wolters died of cancer on June 16, 1997, at the age of 52.

Former bass player Jance Garfat (born March 3, 1944) died in a motorcycle accident on November 6, 2006, at age 62.

Billy Francis, after joining Sawyer in 2001 during his Dr. Hook concerts, died on May 23, 2010, at age 68.

After the original band split, Dennis Locorriere released several solo albums and toured under the names Voice of Dr. Hook and Dennis Locorriere Celebrates Dr. Hook Hits and History Tour. From 2015, he fronted the band Dr. Hook starring Dennis Locorriere, he started the Dr Hook 50th Anniversary World Tour in 2019, but this was postponed due to Locorriere undergoing a prostate procedure resulting in kidney problems. The band resumed their 50th Anniversary Tour on September 3, 2021, with a show at Manchester's Bridgewater Hall and with performances scheduled for Scandinavia, the UK and Ireland in 2022. Locorriere's final version of Dr Hook was made up of John Maher, Michelle Cordelli, Damien Cooper, Tim Bye, Jon Poole and Ryan Farmery.

Former guitarist and keyboardist Bob "Willard" Henke died on February 2, 2023, at the age of 71.

Bassist and vocalist George Cummings died on December 14, 2024.

On Thanksgiving 2025, in what would be his last personal statement regarding his musical career, Locorriere announced on social media that he had ceased touring as Dr. Hook, stating that though he was "as healthy as a guy my age has the audacity to be," he was growing weary of touring and sought to enjoy retirement. Locorriere died of chronic kidney disease on May 16, 2026 at age 76.

== Members ==
Dr. Hook members (1968–1985)

- Dennis Locorriere – vocals, guitar, bass, harmonica (1968–1985, 2015–2025, died 2026)
- Ray Sawyer – vocals, guitar, percussion, congas, maracas (1968–1983, 1988–2015, died 2018)
- Billy Francis – keyboards, vocals (1968–1985, 2001; died 2010)
- George Cummings – lead and steel guitars, vocals (1968–1975; died 2024)
- Joseph Olivier – drums (1968–1970)
- John "Jay" David – drums, vocals (1970–1973)
- Rik Elswit – guitar, vocals (1972–1985)
- Jance Garfat – bass (1972–1985; died 2006)
- John Wolters – drums (1973–1982, 1983–1985; died 1997)
- Bob 'Willard' Henke – guitar, keyboards (1976–1980; died 2023)
- Rod Smarr – guitar (1980–1985; died 2012)
- Walter Hartman – drums (1982–1983)
- Leonard Wolfe – keyboards (1983–1985)

Dr. Hook starring Dennis Locorriere members (2015–2025)

- Dennis Locorriere – vocals, guitar, harmonica (2015–2025, died 2026)
- Willie Dowling – keyboards, vocals (2015–2021)
- Jon Clifford Cox – bass guitar, vocals (2016–2017)
- Jon Poole – bass guitar, vocals (2017–2025)
- Ryan Farmery – keyboards, vocals (2021–2025)
- John Maher – musical director, guitars, keyboards, vocals
- Damien Cooper – guitar, vocals
- Michelle Cordelli – vocals
- Tim Bye – drums, percussion
- Accy Yeats – drums

== Discography ==
- Doctor Hook (1972) (as Dr. Hook & the Medicine Show)
- Sloppy Seconds (1972) (as Dr. Hook & the Medicine Show)
- Belly Up! (1973) (as Dr. Hook & the Medicine Show)
- Bankrupt (1975)
- A Little Bit More (1976)
- Makin' Love and Music (1977)
- Pleasure and Pain (1978)
- Sometimes You Win (1979)
- Rising (1980)
- Players in the Dark (1982)
- Let Me Drink from Your Well (1983)
