= Ray Sawyer =

American singer (1937–2018)

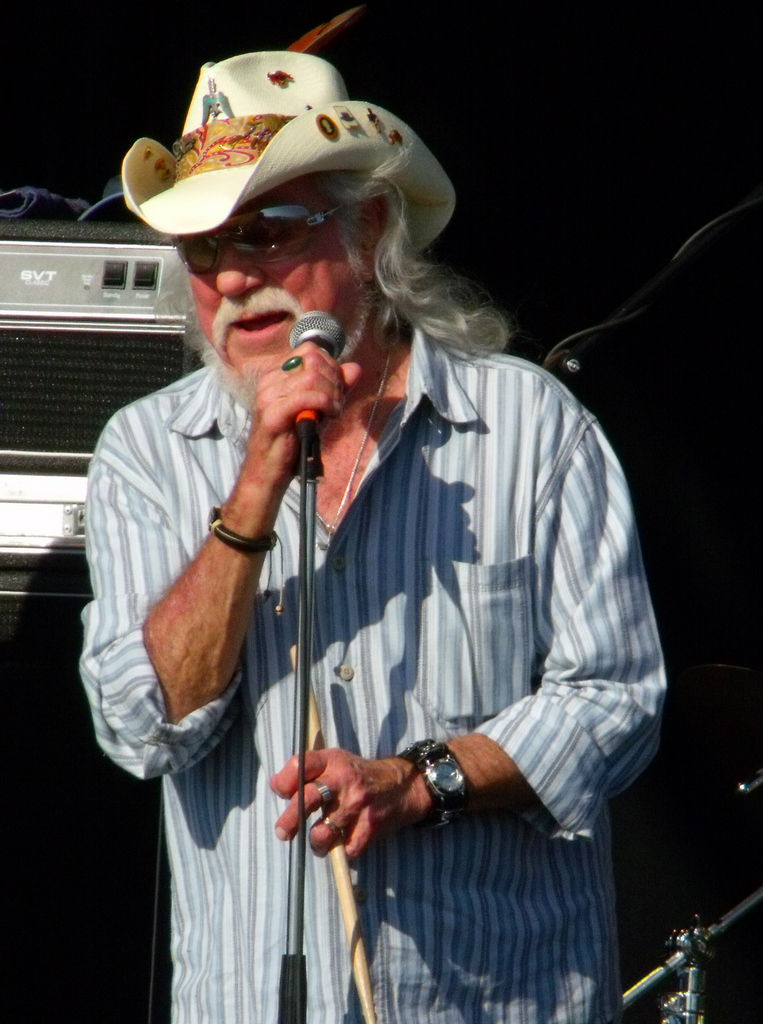
- Sawyer in 2009

Background information
- Born: February 1, 1937; Chickasaw, Alabama, U.S.
- Died: December 31, 2018 (aged 81) Daytona Beach, Florida, U.S.
- Genres: Country
- Occupation: Singer
- Instruments: Vocals, drums, percussion, maracas, congas, guitar
- Years active: 1966–2015
- Formerly of: Dr. Hook

Ray Sawyer (February 1, 1937 – December 31, 2018) was an American percussionist and vocalist known for his work with the 1970s rock band Dr. Hook. Though primarily a backing vocalist and occasional percussionist on congas or maracas, he sang lead on their hit song "The Cover of Rolling Stone" and was a recognizable presence in the band owing to the eyepatch and cowboy hat he wore. He was also the uncle of Wild Fire vocalist Zack Sawyer.

== Career ==
Sawyer was born in Chickasaw, Alabama, and started playing guitar at age eleven, with Hank Williams, Smiley Lewis, and Huey Smith as his influences. Sawyer played in his first band when he was fourteen years old, as their drummer. His first professional band came when he was seventeen, again as their drummer. Sawyer worked regularly in New Orleans in his early years as a musician, where he got to know Dr. John. Sawyer was in many other bands as a drummer, most of which "didn’t have a name".

Sawyer performed in clubs as a singer, and in 1960 signed to Sandy Records, based in Mobile, Alabama. He released two singles in 1960 and 1962.

Sawyer was the vocalist in The Chocolate Papers, a band with George Cummings and Billy Francis. They moved to Union City, New Jersey in 1968, and met vocalist/guitarist/bassist Dennis Locorriere, and then changed their name to Dr. Hook. Their name was a reference to Captain Hook, and because of Sawyer's eye patch, fans thought Sawyer was "Dr. Hook".

Sawyer was a backup vocalist on the band's breakthrough hit, "Sylvia's Mother," as well as many of the Medicine Show's earlier songs. He also released a self-titled solo album on Capitol Records in 1976. Eventually, by the late 1970s, as the band found commercial success, Sawyer stepped back into a backing vocalist role behind Dennis Locorriere, occasionally playing another instrument (for example, on "Better Love Next Time," one of the band's later hits, he can be seen with a prominent bongo part). Sawyer left the band in 1983, allegedly because he was no longer happy with the band's direction.

From 1988 to October 2015, Sawyer toured the nostalgia circuit as "Dr. Hook featuring Ray Sawyer", under license from Locorriere, who toured separately and owned the Dr. Hook trademark. His son, Cayce, joined the band at thirteen years old as a percussionist and backing vocalist, before he became the bands official drummer as an adult.

== Personal life ==
Sawyer lost his right eye in a 1967 automobile accident that left him in a wheelchair for a year. He said the following about his life before the time of his car accident: "I must have played all the clubs from Houston to Charleston, until I decided I was going insane from too much beans and music, and I gave it up. I saw a John Wayne movie and then proceeded to Portland, Oregon, to be a logger complete with plaid shirt, caulk boots, and pike pole. On the way, my car slipped on the road and the accident left me with the eye patch I now wear. When I recovered, I ran straight back to the beans and music and vowed, 'Here, I'll stay'."

After leaving Dr. Hook, Sawyer relocated, first to Europe, then to Daytona Beach, Florida in 2000, where he remained until his death.

Sawyer retired in 2015 and died after a short illness, on December 31, 2018, one month before his 82nd birthday. He was survived by his wife, Linda Lombardi Sawyer, and a son, Cayce.

== Solo discography ==
=== Albums ===
Year	Label	Title	Notes
1977	Capitol	Ray Sawyer	
1995	CMC	A Little Bit More	Released as "Dr. Hook Featuring Ray Sawyer"

=== Singles ===
Year	Label	A-side	B-side	Notes
1960	Sandy	"Bells In My Heart"	"Rockin' Satellite"	
1962	Sandy	"You Gave Me The Right"	"I'm Gonna Leave"	
1976	Capitol	"(One More Year Of) Daddy's Little Girl"	"I Need The High"	
1977	Capitol	"I Need The High (But I Can't Stand The Taste)"	"Walls And Doors"	
1979	Capitol	"I Want Johnny's Job"	"What I'm Holding"	
1979	Capitol	"I Don't Feel Much Like Smilin'"	"Drinking Wine Alone"	
1985	Premier	"I'm Ready (To Fall In Love Again)"	"69 Years (Of Uninterrupted Love)"	
1995	CMC	"Stop Teasing My Heart"		Released as "Dr. Hook Featuring Ray Sawyer"
2007		"The Cover Of The Ebay Motor News"		Released with John Schneider
