= Dennis Locorriere =

American musician (1949–2026)

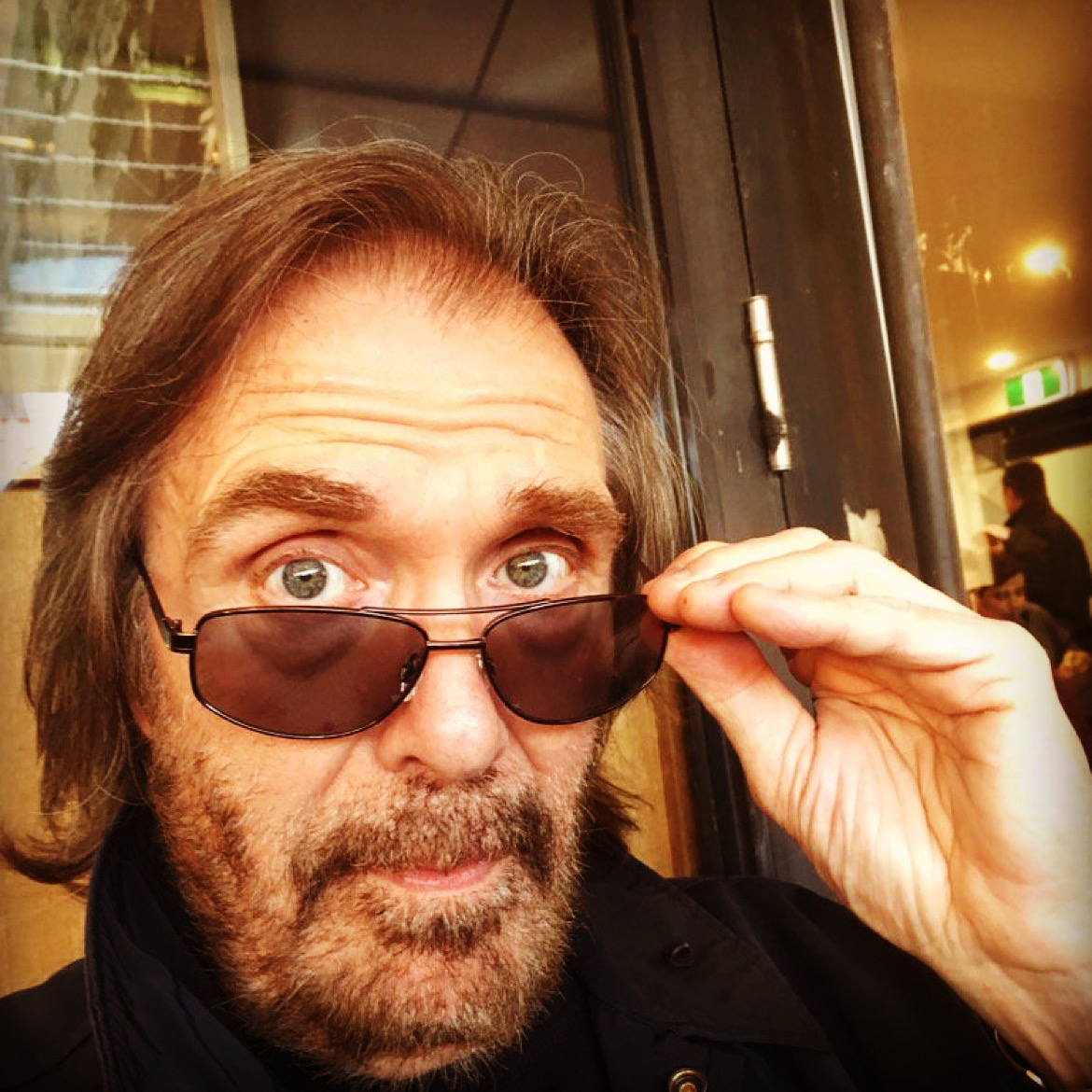
- Locorriere in 2017

Background information
- Born: Dennis Michael Locorriere; June 13, 1949; Jersey City, New Jersey, U.S.
- Died: May 16, 2026 (aged 76) Worthing, West Sussex, England
- Occupations: Singer; actor
- Instruments: Vocals; guitar; harmonica; drums
- Years active: 1968–2026
- Label: Track
- Formerly of: Dr. Hook, Bill Wyman's Rhythm Kings

Dennis Michael Locorriere (June 13, 1949 – May 16, 2026) was an American musician best known as a founding member, guitarist, and primary lead vocalist of the country rock group Dr. Hook (formerly Dr. Hook & the Medicine Show).

== Early life ==
Locorriere was born in Jersey City, New Jersey, the only child to teenage parents Ruth (nee Mantovani) and Lenny Locorriere, both of Italian descent. Because of his parents' young age, Locorriere knew "they didn’t have the knowledge or maturity to keep it together, and, as a result, they never lived as man and wife and the three of us didn’t stand a chance of becoming a family." Dennis was raised by his grandparents Ralph and Angelina Mantovani in Union City, where his mother, who was nineteen when she gave birth to Dennis, was "in and out of the picture until she got a little older".

The first record he bought was "Hey! Baby" by Bruce Channel. His mother knew singer Sam Cooke when he was still a gospel singer, and at age ten was taken to see him live at Palisades Amusement Park.

Locorriere's biggest influence was The Beatles: "Before I started out in the music business I was a music fan listening to the likes of Sam Cooke, but it was when I actually saw The Beatles playing live that I thought ‘perhaps I could actually do this’." Locorriere learned how to play the drums at first, and played in local bars. Dennis did not like having to set up and take down the drums after every gig, and would try to move his set-up drum kit in his car, before giving up the drums and learning the harmonica as he "could fit (it) into my pocket and carry (it) around with me."

== Career ==
In 1968, Locorriere met the band The Chocolate Papers, who had moved to Union City from Alabama. The Chocolate Papers, which included Ray Sawyer, George Cummings, and Billy Francis, hired Locorriere as a vocalist and bassist. By 1969, the band became Dr. Hook and the Medicine Show, later shortened to Dr. Hook in 1975. Locorriere was the primary lead vocalist, and was bassist until 1972, shortly after the release of their debut album, when he switched to lead guitar and hired Jance Garfat as bassist. Dr. Hook was the recipient of more than 60 gold and platinum singles, gaining No. 1 chart status in more than 42 countries.

It was a common misconception that "Dr. Hook" was the name of vocalist/percussionist Ray Sawyer, and that Sawyer was also the lead singer. When asked about this misconception in 2021, Locorriere said: "Yes, that used to really hurt my feelings. When we’d first walk into radio stations, everybody would run and talk to Ray like I was the caterer. On the air, I’d sing and they’d realise. I was nobody’s friend on the way in but everybody’s pal on the way out!"

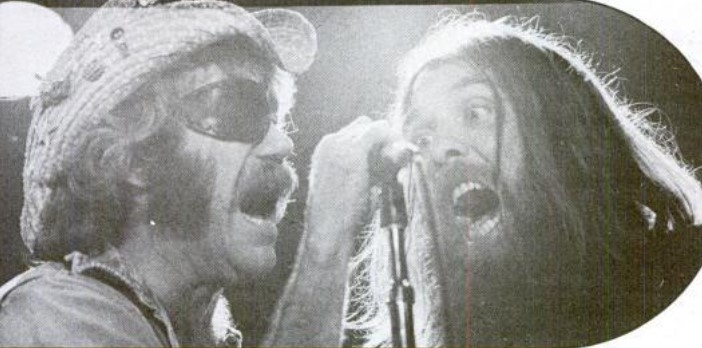
Locorriere (right) with Ray Sawyer in 1975

Locorriere was also a songwriter, whose songs have been recorded by Bob Dylan, Crystal Gayle, BJ Thomas, Helen Reddy, Willie Nelson, Southside Johnny, Olivia Newton-John, and by Jerry Lee Lewis, on his 2006 release, Last Man Standing (co-wrote one song). His song "A Couple More Years", co-written with Shel Silverstein, has been recorded many times, including versions by Dr. Hook, Waylon Jennings, Donna Fargo, Willie Nelson, Lou Rawls, Jerry Lee Lewis, and Bob Dylan.

He performed in The Devil And Billy Markham at Lincoln Center in New York City in 1989. It was written by Shel Silverstein, and directed by Gregory Mosher.

Locorriere, whose company retains ownership of the trademark name Dr. Hook, toured worldwide billed as "Dr. Hook". He also licensed the rights to tour as "Dr. Hook" to Sawyer, who toured as "Dr. Hook starring Ray Sawyer" from 1988 until October 2015, when Sawyer retired.

He contributed his vocals to the albums of others, such as Randy Travis's Always & Forever album (1987). His solo performances include songs from his past, as well as newer material from his solo period. Locorriere released three solo albums, Out of the Dark (2000), One of the Lucky Ones (2005) and Post Cool (2010). A compilation album, Alone in the Studio/The Lost Tapes, was released in 2008. Locorriere released a live CD, Dennis Locorriere - Live in Liverpool (2004), as well as a concert DVD of his solo show, Alone With Dennis Locorriere (2002), a top ten concert DVD of the Dr Hook Hits and History tour (2007) and a concert DVD of the Post Cool tour (2011). In November 2005, he released his narration of Runny Babbit, a book by Shel Silverstein.

In 2007, Locorriere and his band embarked on the Dennis Locorriere Celebrates Dr. Hook Hits and History tour. In July 2008, Locorriere toured the United Kingdom, as a member of Bill Wyman's Rhythm Kings. He is featured on a 2011 live CD Live Communications and footage of the Rhythm Kings featuring Locorriere in the lineup was released on a compilation CD in 2016.

In early 2010, Locorriere again toured in the United Kingdom, promoting his third studio album, Post Cool.

Locorriere's last tour as Dr. Hook took place between September 2021 to February 2022. Locorriere announced on Thanksgiving 2025 that he would cease touring as Dr. Hook to enjoy retirement.

== Personal life and death ==
Locorriere was married three times. He met his first wife, Mary Ann, while on the road with Dr. Hook and married within six months of knowing each other. With Mary Ann, he had a son, Jessejames Locorriere (born 1971), who is now an actor with credits including Ozark and Nashville. Dennis and Mary Ann divorced in the mid-1990s, after eighteen years, and he married his second wife, Susan, before divorcing in 2004. He was married to his third wife, Claire, who is from Britain, until his death. He was a grandfather.

Locorriere moved to Nashville shortly after Dr. Hook disbanded in 1985, with his son, and in 2002, moved to Worthing, West Sussex, England, where he gained British citizenship and remained until his death. Locorriere died of complications from kidney disease on May 16, 2026, at the age of 76.

== Discography and DVD ==
=== Studio albums ===
- Out of the Dark (Track Records, 2000)
- One of the Lucky Ones (Track Records, 2005)
- Post Cool (2010)

=== Live albums ===
- Alone with... (2002)
- Live in Liverpool (2004)
- Post Cool Live (2011)
- The Voice Of Dr Hook (2021) - Vinyl

=== Compilation albums ===
- Alone in the Studio/The Lost Tapes (2008)
- Retrospection (2011)

=== DVDs ===
- Alone with Dennis Locorriere (2006)
- Hits and History Tour Live (2007)
- Post Cool Live (2011)
