= Dave Marsh =

American music critic and radio talk show host (1950–2026)

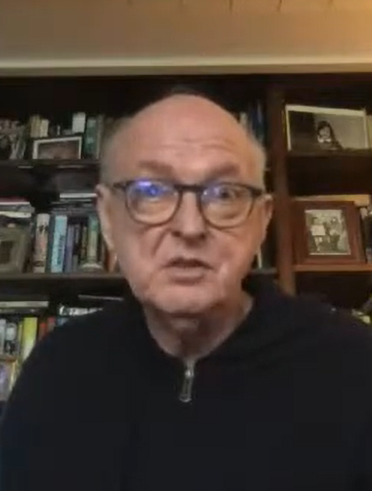
- Marsh in 2021
- Born: March 1, 1950; Pontiac, Michigan, U.S.
- Died: August 14, 2026 (aged 76); Norwalk, Connecticut, U.S.
- Occupations: Music journalist; author
- Years active: 1969–2026

David Rodney Marsh (March 1, 1950 – August 14, 2026) was an American music critic and radio talk show host. He was an early editor of Creem magazine, wrote for various publications such as Newsday, The Village Voice, and Rolling Stone, and published numerous books about music and musicians, mostly focused on rock music. He was also a committee member of the Rock and Roll Hall of Fame.

== Early life ==
Marsh was born and raised in Pontiac, Michigan, and graduated from Waterford Kettering High School in nearby Waterford. He attended Wayne State University in Detroit before dropping out in 1969 to write for Creem magazine.

== Career ==
Marsh began his career as a rock critic and editor at Creem, which he helped start. At Creem, he was mentored by close friend and colleague Lester Bangs. While supportive of punk music in general, he said in a 2001 interview that "I don't know that it was any more important than disco", and believed hip hop is more significant than punk in the history of rock music. He wrote extensively about his favorite artists, including Marvin Gaye, whose song "I Heard It Through the Grapevine" he chose as the number one single of all time in his book The Heart of Rock and Soul: the 1001 Greatest Singles Ever Made, and Sly Stone, whom he called "one of the greatest musical adventurers rock has ever known."

Marsh championed the work of many rock and roll artists of the 1950s and early 1960s, including doo-wop and soul artists and girl groups, in his books and Rolling Stone contributions. Marsh also published four books about Bruce Springsteen, including the bestsellers Born to Run, the first significant biography of Springsteen, and Glory Days. He edited and contributed to Rock and Roll Confidential, a newsletter about rock music and social issues. The newsletter was subsequently renamed Rock and Rap Confidential. Marsh contributed to the 1994 book Mid-Life Confidential, a book about and by the Rock Bottom Remainders, a rock band composed of American authors. He also worked for Newsday and The Real Paper. Marsh's book 360 Sound: The Columbia Records Story—Legends and Legacy, was released in October 2012 as a companion to Sean Wilentz's book 360 Sound: The Columbia Records Story. In the same format as Heart of Rock and Soul, this book covers the 264 greatest songs from Columbia Records beginning with the 1890 performance of John Philip Sousa's "Washington Post March" and working its way chronologically up to Adele's "Rolling in the Deep" (2011). Marsh was the host of three Sirius XM Radio shows: Live from E Street Nation, Kick Out the Jams, and Live from the Land of Hopes and Dreams.

=== Criticism of musicians ===
Marsh was sometimes referred to as a "grumpy rock and roll journalist" due to his acerbic comments on popular musicians whom he disliked. In 1976, he wrote that Led Zeppelin had an "insurmountable flaw" in drummer John Bonham, whom he saw as "something like clinically incompetent" and responsible for marring every Zeppelin album to date. In 1977, he described acclaimed Queen singer Freddie Mercury as possessing a "passable pop voice", and described "We Will Rock You" as a "marching order: you will not rock us, we will rock you. Indeed, Queen may be the first truly fascist rock band. ... [I] wonder why anyone would indulge these creeps and their polluting ideas."

In 1975, Marsh said of Bob Dylan's well-received Blood on the Tracks: "The long songs, particularly, suffer from flat, tangled imagery, and the music, with all its hints at the old glory, is often incompetently performed. I suppose it's all a matter of what you're willing to settle for." Marsh described Bob Seger's 1980 album Against the Wind as "absolutely cowardly", despite being supportive of his earlier work.

In the 1983 Rolling Stone Record Guide, Marsh called Journey "calculated" and "a dead end for San Francisco area rock", awarding their entire discography the minimum score of 1/5 stars. Journey singer Steve Perry called Marsh "an unusual little man who all too often thinks that his subjective opinions translate to inarguable fact". In the same book, Marsh described Air Supply as the "most calculated and soulless pseudo-group of its kind, which is saying something". In 1989, Marsh referred to the Grateful Dead as the "worst band in creation".

Marsh said of Kiss's candidacy for the Rock and Roll Hall of Fame: "Kiss is not a great band. Kiss was never a great band. Kiss never will be a great band, and I have done my share to keep them off the ballot." On the eve of the band's induction into the Hall in 2014, Marsh said: "I was done with them before I ever turned the first album over to the second side. ... [A]ll that mediocrity was harmless enough until the boastful bassist decided to turn it into a propaganda machine for the only two things he's ever loved: Gene Simmons and money." Kiss guitarist Paul Stanley described Marsh as "pompous" and said he had "no clue".

== Personal life and death ==
Through his marriage to Barbara Carr, a co-manager of Bruce Springsteen, Marsh was stepfather to her two daughters, Kristen Ann and Dr. Sasha J. Carr. Kristen died in 1993 from sarcoma, leading to the family founding the Kristen Ann Carr Fund. (In 1999, he wrote liner notes to the album Somewhere between heaven and earth by Cindy Bullens, about the death of her daughter Jessie Bullens-Crewe). Sasha, a clinical psychologist, died in 2024.

Marsh died at his home in Norwalk, Connecticut, on August 14, 2026, at the age of 76.

Bruce Springsteen paid tribute to him, writing on his website: "Here on E Street, the irreplaceable loss of Dave Marsh has us heartbroken....More than anything else, I admired Dave as a man of conscience and commitment. He lived and stuck by his values come hell or high water. Wherever he is, I hope he's receiving some of the grace, happiness and reward he's brought into my life."

== Bibliography ==
- Born to Run: The Bruce Springsteen Story (Doubleday), 1979. ISBN 978-0-440-10694-4.
- The Book of Rock Lists (Dell), 1980. ISBN 978-0-283-98837-0.
- Elvis (Times Books), 1982. ISBN 978-1-56025-038-8.
- Rocktopicon: Unlikely questions and their surprising answers (Contemporary), 1982. ISBN 978-0-8092-5474-3
- Before I Get Old: The Story of the Who (St. Martin's Press), 1983. ISBN 978-0-85965-083-0
- Fortunate Son (Random House) 1983. ISBN 978-0-394-72119-4. A collection of his journalism and criticism.
- The First Rock and Roll Confidential Report: Inside the Real World of Rock and Roll, 1984. ISBN 978-0-394-74070-6. Compilation.
- Sun City: The Making of the Record (Penguin), 1985. ISBN 978-0-14-008997-4.
- Trapped: Michael Jackson and the Crossover Dream (Bantam), 1986. ISBN 978-0-553-34241-3.
- The Rolling Stone Record Guide: Reviews and Ratings of Almost 10,000 Currently Available Rock, Pop, Soul, Country, Blues, Jazz, and Gospel Albums (first and second editions, 1979, 1983). ISBN 978-0-394-72107-1.
- Glory Days: Bruce Springsteen in the 1980s, 1987. ISBN 978-0-440-20551-7. A sequel to Born to Run.
- The Heart of Rock & Soul: The 1001 Greatest Singles Ever Made. Da Capo Press. 1999. ISBN 978-0-306-80901-9. OCLC 40200194.
- Heaven Is Under Our Feet: A Book for Walden Woods, co-editor with Don Henley (Longmeadow Press, 1991). ISBN 978-0-681-41129-6.
- 50 Ways to Fight Censorship: And Important Facts to Know About the Censors (Thunder's Mouth Press), 1991. ISBN 978-1-56025-011-1.
- Louie Louie: The History and Mythology of the World's Most Famous Rock'n'Roll song; Including the Full Details of Its Torture and Persecution at the Hands of the Kingsmen, J. Edgar Hoover's F.B.I., and a Cast of Millions; and Introducing, for the First Time Anywhere, the Actual Dirty Lyrics (Hyperion), 1992. ISBN 978-0-312-16859-9.
- Merry Christmas Baby: Holiday Music from Bing to Sting (Little Brown), 1992. ISBN 978-0-316-54733-8.
- Pastures of Plenty: A Self-Portrait with Harold Leventhal and featuring the writings of Woody Guthrie (Perennial), 1992. ISBN 978-0-380-79377-8.
- The New Book of Rock Lists with James Bernard (Fireside), 1994. ISBN 978-0-671-78700-4.
- Mid-Life Confidential: The Rock Bottom Remainders Tour America with Three Chords and an Attitude (Viking), 1994. ISBN 978-0-340-61754-0.
- Sam and Dave (For the Record series; Harper Perennial), 1998. ISBN 978-0-380-79375-4.
- Sly and the Family Stone: An Oral History (For the Record series; Quill), 1998. ISBN 978-0-380-79377-8.
- George Clinton & P-Funkadelic (For the Record series; Harper Perennial), 1998. ISBN 978-0-380-79378-5.
- Bruce Springsteen: Two Hearts: The Definitive Biography, 1972–2003 (Routledge), 2003. ISBN 978-0-415-96928-4. Combines earlier two works about Bruce and adds a new chapter.
- Forever Young: Photographs of Bob Dylan with Douglas R. Gilbert (Da Capo Press) 2005. ISBN 978-0-306-81481-5.
- Bruce Springsteen on Tour: 1968–2005 (Bloomsbury USA), 2006. ISBN 978-1-59691-282-3.
- The Beatles' Second Album (Rodale Books), 2007. ISBN 978-1-59486-426-1.
- 360 Sound: The Columbia Records Story (with primary author Sean Wilentz) (Chronicle Books), 2012. ISBN 978-1-4521-0756-1.
