= Trailer II =

Demo album by Chris Knight
- Released: September 15, 2009
- Recorded: 1996
- Studio: Chris Knight's trailer (Slaughter, Kentucky)
- Genre: Country
- Length: 44:40
- Label: Thirty Tigers
- Producer: Joe Hayden; Frank Liddell

Chris Knight chronology
| Heart of Stone (2008) | Trailer II (2009) | Little Victories (2012) |

Trailer II (sometimes referred to as The Trailer Tapes II) is the seventh overall album and second demo album by American country music artist Chris Knight. The album was released on September 15, 2009, via Thirty Tigers. It was co-produced by Joe Hayden and Frank Liddell.

== Critical reception and legacy ==
Professional ratings
Review scores
| Source | Rating |
|---|---|
| AllMusic | 4/5 stars |
| American Songwriter | 3.5/5 stars |
| PopMatters | 8/10 |

Trailer II was generally well received by critics, though it was sometimes viewed as less essential than The Trailer Tapes because much of its material had already been released in studio versions.

Although recorded more than a decade before its release, Trailer II has been described as a valuable continuation of The Trailer Tapes, preserving Knight's earliest, most unvarnished songwriting.

== Track listing ==
All tracks written by Chris Knight, with additional co-writers listed.

| No. | Title | Writer(s) | Originally from | Length |
|---|---|---|---|---|
| 1. | "Old Man" | | Enough Rope | 4:11 |
| 2. | "It Ain't Easy Being Me" | Craig Wiseman | Chris Knight | 3:30 |
| 3. | "Highway Junkie" | Annie Tate; Sam Tate | A Pretty Good Guy | 4:40 |
| 4. | "Summer of '75" | A. Tate; S. Tate | Chris Knight | 3:23 |
| 5. | "Bring the Harvest Home" | Wiseman | Chris Knight | 3:27 |
| 6. | "I'll Be There" | Kim Richey | Previously unreleased | 3:40 |
| 7. | "Send a Boat" | | A Pretty Good Guy | 4:11 |
| 8. | "The River's Own" | Gordon Bradberry | Chris Knight | 4:09 |
| 9. | "Love and a .45" | Fred Eaglesmith | Chris Knight | 3:24 |
| 10. | "Speeding Train" | | Previously unreleased | 2:35 |
| 11. | "Blame Me" | Eaglesmith | A Pretty Good Guy | 3:55 |
| 12. | "Till My Leavin's Through" | | Previously unreleased | 3:35 |
| Total length: | | | | 44:47 |

== Personnel ==
- Chris Knight – vocals, acoustic guitar

=== Production ===
- Frank Liddell – producer
- Joe Hayden – producer, engineer
- Ray Kennedy – mixing, mastering
- Travis Hill – production assistant
- Chris Kro – design, layout
- Mark Tucker – photography
- Rick Alter – management

== Charts ==
Weekly chart performance for Trailer II
| Chart (2009) | Peak position |
|---|---|
| US Top Country Albums (Billboard) | 64 |
