= What a Way to Go =

What a Way to Go may refer to:

- What a Way to Go!, a 1964 feature film
- What a Way to Go: Life at the End of Empire, a 2007 documentary film
- "What a Way to Go" (song), a 1977 song by Bobby Borchers, also recorded by Ray Kennedy in 1990
  - What a Way to Go (Ray Kennedy album), Ray Kennedy's 1990 album containing this song
- What a Way to Go (Mark Murphy album), 1990
