= Dream Number 29 =

Studio album by Cindy Bullens
- Released: 2005
- Label: Blue Rose Records
- Producer: Cindy Bullens; Ray Kennedy

Cindy Bullens chronology
Neverland (2001)	Dream Number 29 (2005)	Howling Trains and Barking Dogs (2010)

Dream Number 29 is the seventh album by Cindy Bullens, released on Blue Rose Records in 2005. This album was produced by Bullens herself and Ray Kennedy. It also includes "Dream #29" with Delbert McClinton, featuring Elton John on piano.

== Track listing ==
1. "Oriental Silk"
2. "Jellico Highway"
3. "Box of Broken Heart"
4. "Paper & Glass"
5. "Dream 29 (One True Love)"
6. "Mockingbird Hill"
7. "7 Days"
8. "This Ain´t Love"
9. "Too Close to the Sun"
10. "Love Letter from Las Vegas"
11. "January Sky"
