= Cidny Bullens =

American singer-songwriter

- Born: Cindy Bullens; March 21, 1955 (age 71)
- Origin: Massachusetts, US
- Genres: Rock; Americana
- Occupations: Backup vocalist; singer-songwriter; musician
- Instruments: Piano; guitar
- Years active: 1970s–present
- Labels: United Artists; Casablanca; MCA; Artemis; Blue Lobster; Blue Rose; MC
- Website: cidnybullens.com

Cidny Bullens (formerly known as Cindy Bullens; born March 21, 1955) is an American singer-songwriter, who is best known for serving as backup vocalist on tours and albums with Elton John and Rod Stewart, providing vocals on the soundtrack of the 1978 feature film Grease, and for nine critically acclaimed solo albums. In 2012, Bullens publicly came out as a transgender man and changed his name to Cidny Bullens.

== Career ==
=== 1970s: Early career ===
At the beginning of his music career, Bullens (then Cindy Bullens) was a backing vocalist. In 1974, Bullens performed backing vocals on Gene Clark's album No Other, and Don Everly's solo album Sunset Towers. In 1975, he was one of the Sex-O-Lettes on the self-titled debut album by Disco-Tex and the Sex-O-Lettes. Bullens also had featured backing vocals on Rod Stewart's 1975 album Atlantic Crossing. Throughout his career, Bullens made guest appearances as a backing vocalist on multiple albums, such as Bryan Adams' You Want It, You Got It, among others.

In the mid-1970s, Bullens nearly appeared on Bob Dylan's Rolling Thunder Revue through his connection with Bob Neuwirth. Instead, he became known for touring with Elton John, as his backing vocalist on three major tours. Bullens featured on John's 1976 album Blue Moves and on his hit song "Don't Go Breaking My Heart", with Kiki Dee (both released in 1976).

For the 1978 feature film Grease soundtrack, Bullens provided vocals on three songs ("It's Raining on Prom Night", "Mooning", and "Freddy, My Love"). The film's soundtrack album was nominated for the 1979 Grammy Award for Album of the Year.

=== 1978–1979: Desire Wire and Steal the Night ===
Bullens's 1978 debut album, Desire Wire, was released on United Artists. For the single "Survivor", Bullens earned a Grammy nomination for Best Female Rock Vocal Performance. In January 1980, Bullens entered the Billboard Hot 100 with the song "Trust Me". It peaked at No. 90.

In the following year, Bullens released his second album, Steal the Night, on Casablanca in 1979. The album was co-produced with guitarist Mark Doyle. Bullens performed with a live band, consisting of keyboardist Trantham Whitley, bassist Howard Epstein, drummer Thom Mooney, and Doyle. After having creative differences with the record company, Bullens left the label and struggled to re-enter the music business.

=== 1980s–1990s: Cindy Bullens and Somewhere Between Heaven and Earth ===
Bullens withdrew from the music business in the early 1980s to raise a family. In 1989, Bullens released his self-titled album. He returned in the early 1990s as a songwriter, touring, and recording artist.

In 1999, Bullens's album Somewhere Between Heaven and Earth, was released on Artemis Records. The album was recorded in the first two years after the death of his daughter Jessie. It features Bonnie Raitt, Lucinda Williams, Rodney Crowell, Beth Nielsen Chapman, and Bryan Adams, with other additional musicians, including George Marinelli, Benmont Tench, Kenny Edwards, and Michael Rhodes. Steven Soles, Tony Berg and Crowell co-produced a range of tracks on the album. It won the AFIM Best Rock Album in 2000.

=== 2000s: Neverland and Howling Trains and Barking Dogs ===
Since 1999, Bullens has toured extensively all over the US, Canada, Europe and Australia, has appeared on several major TV shows, including Late Night with Conan O'Brien, Today Show, and CBS This Morning and many radio and TV stations around the world. He is featured in two documentaries, On This Island and Space Between Breaths (and scored the music). Bullens wrote the music and lyrics for the musical Islands in 2000, which played on Broadway for a special performance at the New Victory Theater in September 2001, two weeks after 9/11.

In 2001, Bullens released Neverland; co-produced with Ray Kennedy, the album features Emmylou Harris, Steve Earle, and John Hiatt. In 2005, he released Dream Number 29, again co-produced with Ray Kennedy. The title track features Elton John on piano. Delbert McClinton sings a duet with Bullens on "This Ain't Love" and Boston Red Sox knuckleballer Tim Wakefield adds his voice to "7 Days".

In June 2010, Bullens released Howling Trains and Barking Dogs on MC Records (Koch). The CD is a compilation of songs he co-wrote in Nashville during the early and mid-1990s with Radney Foster, Bill Lloyd, Al Anderson, Matraca Berg, Mary Ann Kennedy, Kye Fleming, and Jimmy Tittle. The CD also includes two new songs written by him alone.

=== The Refugees ===
In 2007, Bullens formed a new group, The Refugees, with music veterans Wendy Waldman and Deborah Holland. Their first CD, Unbound, was released in January 2009. Their second album "Three" was released in February 2012.

=== 2020s: Walkin' Through This World ===
In August 2020, Bullens released his first album as Cidny, Walkin' Through This World, co-produced by Bullens and Ray Kennedy (Lucinda Williams, Steve Earle, Rodney Crowell). This new album is loosely themed around Cidny's gender transition, featuring the provocative first single "The Gender Line".

Bullens is also the subject of the award-winning documentary short The Gender Line (directed by TJ Parsell and produced by Bill Brimm), which played in many film festivals worldwide in 2019–20.

On June 6th, 2023, Bullens released a memoir, "Trans electric: My Life as a Cosmic Rock Star" published by Chicago Review Press.

== Personal life ==
Bullens grew up in Massachusetts. In 1979, Bullens married Dan Crewe, brother of songwriter/producer Bob Crewe, and divorced in 2002. Their daughter Reid was born in 1982. In 1996, their younger daughter, Jessie, born in 1985, died at age 11, of complications from Hodgkin lymphoma.

As an artistic outlet for coming out as transgender in 2012, Bullens debuted a "one wo/man show" entitled Somewhere Between – Not an Ordinary Life in February 2016. Nashville Scene voted it to be the "Best One-Person Show of 2016". In terms of his previous life as Cindy, he considers his previous identity to be "a different person."

== Discography ==
=== Solo career ===
- Desire Wire (United Artists Records, 1979) – LP and cassette.
- Steal the Night (Casablanca Records, 1979) – LP and cassette.
- Cindy Bullens (MCA Records, 1989) – LP, cassette and CD.
- Why Not? (Blue Lobster Records, 1994) – Cassette and CD.
- Somewhere Between Heaven and Earth (Artemis Records, 1999) – LP, cassette and CD.
- Neverland (Artemis Records, 2001) – LP, cassette and CD.
- Dream Number 29 (Blue Rose Records, 2005) – Cassette and CD.
- Howling Trains and Barking Dogs (M.C. Records, 2010) – LP and CD.
- Walkin' Through This World (Blue Lobster Records, 2020) - CD, digital

=== With the Refugees ===
- Unbound (Wabuho Records, 2009)
- Three (Wabuho Records, 2012)
- How Far It Goes (Wabuho Records, 2019)
- California (Wabuho Records, 2023)
