= Little Victories (Chris Knight album) =

Studio album by Chris Knight
- Released: September 11, 2012
- Studio: Room & Board Studio (Berry Hill, Tennessee)
- Genre: Country
- Length: 44:47
- Label: Drifter's Church
- Producer: Ray Kennedy

Chris Knight chronology
Trailer II (2009)	Little Victories (2012)	Almost Daylight (2019)

Singles from Little Victories
- 1. "In the Mean Time" Released: July 3, 2012

Little Victories is the eighth studio album by American country music artist Chris Knight. The album was released on September 11, 2012, via Drifter's Church. It was produced by Ray Kennedy. The record marked Knight's first original release in four years, following his 2008 album Heart of Stone and three years after his demo album Trailer II in 2009.

Professional ratings
Review scores
Source	Rating
Christgau's Record Guide	***

Commercially, the album peaked at number 25 on the Billboard Top Country Albums chart.

== Track listing ==
All tracks written by Chris Knight, with additional co-writers listed.

No.	Title	Writer(s)	Length
1.	"In the Mean Time"		4:06
2.	"Missing You"		3:58
3.	"You Lie When You Call My Name"	Lee Ann Womack	4:02
4.	"Low Down Ramblin' Blues"		4:49
5.	"Nothing on Me"	Craig Wiseman	3:34
6.	"Little Victories" (with John Prine)	Gary Nicholson	3:00
7.	"You Can't Trust No One"	Austin Cunningham	4:26
8.	"Out of This Hole"	Sean McConnell	3:41
9.	"Jack Loved Jesse"	Dan Baird	4:12
10.	"Hard Edges"	Wiseman	4:51
11.	"The Lonesome Way"	Nicholson	4:08
Total length:			44:47

== Personnel ==
Musicians

- Chris Knight – vocals, acoustic guitars
- Ray Kennedy – Wurlitzer electric piano, Hammond B3 organ, electric guitars
- Chris Clark – electric guitars, banjo, mandolin, backing vocals
- Mike McAdam – electric guitars
- Dan Baird – electric guitars (9), tambourine (9), vocals (9)
- Tammy Rogers – mandolin, viola, violin
- Drake Leonard – bass
- Michael Grando – drums
- Buddy Miller – vocals (1, 2)
- Siobhan Maher Kennedy – vocals (3, 11)
- John Prine – vocals (6)

Production

- Ray Kennedy – producer, recording, mixing, mastering
- Chris Kro – artwork, design
- Rick Alter – management

== Charts ==
Weekly chart performance for Little Victories
Chart (2012)	Peak position
US Billboard 200	148
US Top Country Albums (Billboard)	25
US Heatseekers Albums (Billboard)	4
US Independent Albums (Billboard)	33
