= Dr. Hook discography =

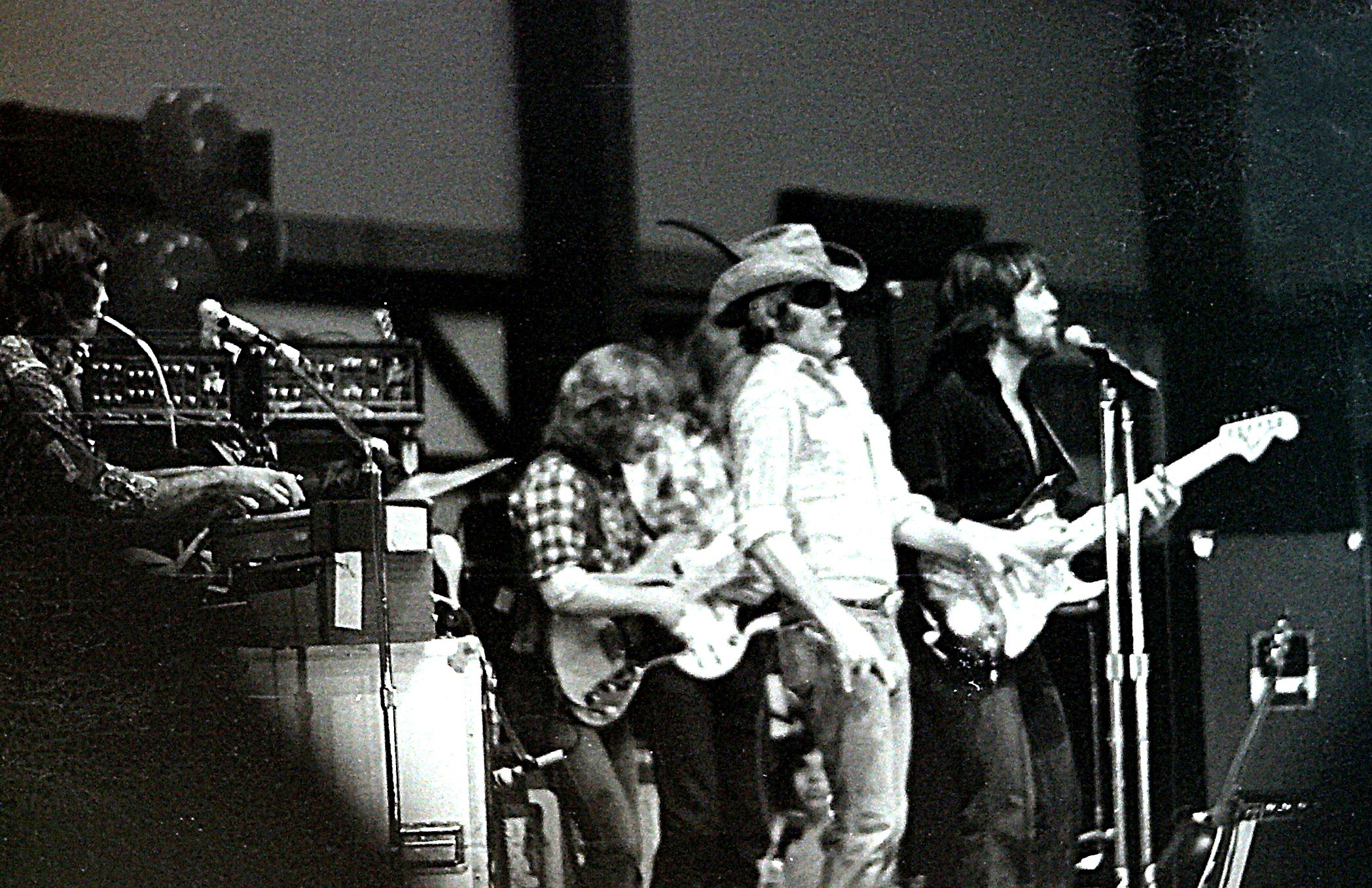
- Dr. Hook performing at a telethon in 1977
- Studio albums: 11
- Live albums: 1
- Compilation albums: 23
- Singles: 33

The discography of the American rock band Dr. Hook consists of 11 studio albums, 1 live album, 23 compilation albums, and 33 singles.

== Albums ==
=== Studio and live albums ===
Year	Album	Peak chart positions										Certification
Year	Album	US	US Country	AUS	CAN	DEN	NLD	NOR	NZ	SWE	UK	Certification
1972	Doctor Hook (as Dr. Hook & the Medicine Show)	45	—	22	38	5	—	26	—	—	—	AUS: Gold
1972	Sloppy Seconds (as Dr. Hook & the Medicine Show)	41	—	43	16	—	—	17	—	—	—	AUS: Gold
1973	Belly Up! (as Dr. Hook & the Medicine Show)	141	—	—	—	7	—	—	—	—	—	
1975	Bankrupt	141	—	71	—	2	—	—	—	—	—	AUS: Gold
1976	A Little Bit More	62	18	10	69	1	—	2	33	3	5	AUS: Platinum; BPI: Gold; MC: Gold
1977	Makin' Love and Music	—	—	14	—	—	—	3	—	3	39	
1978	Pleasure and Pain	66	17	30	93	—	6	5	—	4	47	RIAA: Gold; MC: Platinum; RMNZ: Platinum
1979	Sometimes You Win	71	—	50	59	—	46	3	—	12	14	BPI: Gold; MC: Platinum
1980	Rising	175	—	11	—	—	—	8	—	31	44	BPI: Silver
1981	Live in the U.K. (US title: Dr. Hook Live)	—	—	—	—	—	—	—	—	—	90	
1982	Players in the Dark	118	—	40	—	—	—	17	—	38	—	
1983	Let Me Drink from Your Well	—	—	—	—	—	—	20	—	—	—	
"—" denotes releases that did not chart or were not released in that territory.

=== Compilation albums ===
Year	Album	Peak chart positions					Certification
Year	Album	US	AUS	CAN	NZ	UK	Certification
1975	The Ballad of Lucy Jordon	—	—	—	—	—	
1976	Dr. Hook Revisited	—	—	—	—	—	
1976	The Best of Dr. Hook	—	—	—	—	—	
1978	Remedies	—	13	—	—	—	
1980	Greatest Hits	142	1	32	1	2	ARIA: Platinum; BPI: Platinum
1984	The Rest of Dr. Hook	—	—	—	—	—	
1992	Completely Hooked – The Best of Dr. Hook	—	—	—	1	3	BPI: Platinum; MC: Gold
1993	Take the Bait	—	—	—	—	—	
1995	Dr. Hook and the Medicine Show – Greatest Hits	—	—	—	—	—	
1996	Sharing the Night Together – The Best of Dr. Hook	—	—	—	—	—	BPI: Gold
1999	Love Songs	—	—	—	—	8	BPI: Silver
2001	Collections	—	—	—	—	—	
2003	The Definitive Collection	—	29	—	—	—	
2003	The Essential Dr. Hook & The Medicine Show	—	—	—	—	—	BPI: Gold; RMNZ: Gold
2004	Original Hits	—	—	—	—	—	
2004	Greatest Hits	—	—	—	—	—	
2005	The Best Of	—	—	—	—	—	
2007	Hits and History	—	—	—	—	14	BPI: Gold
2007	Super Hits	—	—	—	—	—	
2007	Greatest Hooks	—	—	—	12	—	
2014	Timeless	—	36	—	6	9	BPI: Silver
2014	A Little Bit More – The Collection	—	—	—	—	—	
2016	Collected	—	—	—	—	—	
"—" denotes releases that did not chart or were not released in that territory.

== Singles ==
Year	Single	Peak chart positions											Certifications (sales threshold)	Album
Year	Single	US	US Country	US AC	AUS	CAN	CAN Country	CAN AC	IRE	NZ	SA	UK	Certifications (sales threshold)	Album
1971	"Last Morning"	—	—	—	—	—	—	—	—	—	—	—		Who Is Harry Kellerman and Why Is He Saying Those Terrible Things About Me?
1972	"Sylvia's Mother"	5	—	—	1	2	—	—	1	1	1	2	RIAA: Gold; RMNZ: Platinum	Dr. Hook
1972	"Carry Me Carrie"	71	—	—	—	82	—	—	—	—	—	—		Sloppy Seconds
1972	"The Cover of 'Rolling Stone'"	6	—	—	32	2	—	—	—	3	—	—	RIAA: Gold; RMNZ: Platinum	Sloppy Seconds
1973	"Roland the Roadie and Gertrude the Groupie"	83	—	—	—	74	—	—	—	—	—	—		Belly Up!
1973	"Life Ain't Easy"	68	—	—	—	—	—	—	—	—	—	—		Belly Up!
1974	"Cops and Robbers"	—	—	—	—	—	—	—	—	—	—	—		Singles only
1974	"The Ballad of Lucy Jordan"	—	—	—	—	—	—	—	—	—	—	—		Singles only
1975	"The Stimu Dr. Hook"	—	—	—	—	—	—	—	—	—	—	—		Promo only
1975	"The Millionaire"	95	—	—	8	—	—	—	—	—	—	—		Bankrupt
1975	"Everybody's Makin' It Big But Me"	—	—	—	—	—	—	—	—	36	—	—		Bankrupt
1975	"Only Sixteen"	6	55	14	8	3	—	9	—	9	—	—	RIAA: Gold; ARIA: Gold	Bankrupt
1976	"A Little Bit More"	11	—	15	10	4	—	6	2	13	—	2	BPI: Gold; RMNZ: Gold	A Little Bit More
1976	"A Couple More Years"	—	51	—	—	—	—	—	—	—	—	—		A Little Bit More
1976	"If Not You"	55	26	21	69	56	—	9	3	—	—	5		A Little Bit More
1977	"Walk Right In"	46	92	39	1	77	—	30	—	11	—	—		Makin' Love and Music
1977	"What a Way to Go"	—	—	—	41	—	—	—	—	—	—	—		Makin' Love and Music
1977	"Sleeping Late"	—	—	—	—	—	—	—	—	—	—	—		Makin' Love and Music
1977	"Makin’ Love and Music"	—	—	—	—	—	—	—	—	—	—	—		Makin' Love and Music
1978	"More Like the Movies"	—	—	—	93	—	—	—	4	—	—	14		A Little Bit More
1978	"Sharing the Night Together"	6	50	18	10	3	40	4	—	12	—	43	RIAA: Gold; MC: Gold; RMNZ: 2× Platinum	Pleasure and Pain
1979	"All the Time in the World"	54	82	41	—	60	64	12	—	—	—	—		Pleasure and Pain
1979	"When You're in Love with a Beautiful Woman"	6	68	5	20	4	22	7	1	2	—	1	RIAA: Gold; BPI: Gold; MC: Gold; RMNZ: 3× Platinum	Pleasure and Pain
1979	"Better Love Next Time"	12	91	3	24	39	—	10	6	7	—	8	RMNZ: Platinum	Sometimes You Win
1980	"Sexy Eyes"	5	—	6	41	8	—	1	3	1	20	4	RIAA: Gold; RMNZ: 2× Platinum	Sometimes You Win
1980	"Years from Now"	51	—	17	72	63	—	3	—	—	—	47		Sometimes You Win
1980	"Girls Can Get It"	34	—	—	3	—	—	—	—	5	5	40		Rising
1981	"That Didn't Hurt Too Bad"	69	—	—	—	—	—	—	—	—	—	—		Rising
1981	"Body Talking"	—	—	—	—	—	—	—	—	36	—	—		Rising
1981	"The Wild Colonial Boy"	—	—	—	4	—	—	—	—	—	—	—		Single only (Note: "The Wild Colonial Boy" was included on some Australian copies of Rising.)
1982	"Baby Makes Her Blue Jeans Talk"	25	—	—	11	17	—	—	—	4	1	—		Players in the Dark
1982	"Loveline"	60	—	19	—	—	—	—	—	—	—	—		Players in the Dark
1983	"I'll Put Angels Around You"	—	—	—	—	—	—	—	—	—	—	—		Let Me Drink from Your Well
"—" denotes releases that did not chart or were not released in that territory.

== Notes ==
B. The 1980 single “S.O.S. For Love” (MER58) is missing from the discography. It failed to chart in the UK.

C. The 1982 single “Rings” (MER124) is also missing.
