= The Trailer Tapes =

Demo album by Chris Knight
- Released: April 3, 2007
- Recorded: 1996
- Studio: Chris Knight's trailer (Slaughter, Kentucky)
- Genre: Country
- Length: 39:16
- Label: Thirty Tigers
- Producer: Ray Kennedy; Frank Liddell; Joe Hayden

Chris Knight chronology
Enough Rope (2006)	The Trailer Tapes (2007)	Heart of Stone (2008)

The Trailer Tapes is the fifth overall album and first demo album by American country music artist Chris Knight. The album was released on April 3, 2007, via Thirty Tigers. It was co-produced by Ray Kennedy and Frank Liddell.

== Critical reception and legacy ==
Professional ratings
Review scores
Source	Rating
AllMusic	4/5 stars
PopMatters	7/10

Critics emphasized that while the recordings were originally demos, they revealed Knight to be a fully formed songwriter at an early stage in his career.

Although a few tracks, such as "Spike Drivin' Blues" and "Leaving Souvenirs", were seen as less polished, the collection was generally praised as a valuable and essential addition to Knight's catalog.

== Track listing ==
All tracks written by Chris Knight.

No.	Title	Length
1.	"Backwater Blues"	3:06
2.	"Something Changed"	3:39
3.	"Rita's Only Fault"	4:06
4.	"Spike Drivin' Blues"	3:23
5.	"Move On"	3:25
6.	"Hard Edges"	2:58
7.	"Here Comes the Rain"	4:09
8.	"Leaving Souvenirs"	3:28
9.	"House and 90 Acres"	3:28
10.	"If I Were You"	3:00
11.	"My Only Prayer"	4:34
Total length:		39:16

== Personnel ==
- Chris Knight – vocals, acoustic guitar

=== Production ===
- Frank Liddell – producer
- Joe Hayden – producer, engineer
- Ray Kennedy – producer, mixing, mastering
- John Drioli – production assistant
- Travis Hill – production assistant
- Mark Tucker – photography
- Chris Kro – design
- Rick Alter – management

== Charts ==
Weekly chart performance for The Trailer Tapes
Chart (2007)	Peak position
US Billboard 200	40
US Top Country Albums (Billboard)	68
US Heatseekers Albums (Billboard)	40
