= Almost Daylight =

Studio album by Chris Knight
- Released: October 11, 2019
- Studio: Room & Board Studio (Berry Hill, Tennessee)
- Genre: Country
- Length: 40:51
- Label: Drifter's Church
- Producer: Ray Kennedy

Chris Knight chronology
Little Victories (2012)	Almost Daylight (2019)

Almost Daylight is the ninth studio album by American country music artist Chris Knight. The album was released on October 11, 2019, via Drifter's Church. It was produced by Ray Kennedy. The record marked Knight's first release in seven years, following his 2012 album Little Victories.

The album was recorded in Berry Hill, Tennessee, and was produced by Grammy-winning producer Ray Kennedy, who had worked on Knight's previous album, Little Victories.

"I'm William Callahan" was released as a promotional single. A music video was also released.

The record also includes Knight's first use of cover songs on an album. These are Johnny Cash's "Flesh and Blood", which Knight had previously recorded for a 2002 tribute album, and John Prine's "Mexican Home", performed here as a duet with Prine. Womack guests on "Sent It on Down", which she recorded on her 2014 album The Way I'm Livin'.

== Track listing ==
No.	Title	Writer(s)	Length
1.	"I'm William Callahan"	Chris Knight; Tim Krekel	3:19
2.	"Crooked Mile"	Knight; Gary Nicholson	4:05
3.	"I Won't Look Back"	Knight	2:46
4.	"Go On"	Knight; Dan Baird; Nicholson	2:51
5.	"The Damn Truth"	Knight; Nicholson	4:46
6.	"Send It on Down" (featuring Lee Ann Womack)	Knight; David Leone	3:59
7.	"Almost Daylight"	Knight; Christy Sutherland	3:08
8.	"Trouble Up Ahead"	Knight	4:26
9.	"Everybody's Lonely Now"	Knight; Baird	3:17
10.	"Flesh and Blood"	Johnny Cash	3:09
11.	"Mexican Home" (featuring John Prine)	John Prine	5:05
Total length:			40:51

== Personnel ==
Musicians

- Chris Knight – vocals, acoustic guitars
- Chris Clark – acoustic piano, Wurlitzer electric piano, accordion, electric guitars, banjo, mandolin, harmonica, backing vocals
- Jim Hoke – Hammond B3 organ, accordion
- Dan Baird – electric guitars, backing vocals
- Chuck Mead – acoustic guitars (10)
- Lex Price – bass (1-9, 11)
- David Roe – electric upright bass (10)
- Lynn Williams – drums
- Tammy Rogers – viola, violin
- Siobhan Maher Kennedy – backing vocals (5, 9)
- Lee Ann Womack – backing vocals (6)
- John Prine – vocals (11)

Production

- Ray Kennedy – producer, recording, mixing, digital mastering, photography
- Keller Moore – assistant engineer
- Dan Baird – special helper
- Zen Masters (Nashville, Tennessee) – digital mastering location
- Pete Lyman – vinyl mastering at Infrasonic Mastering (Nashville, Tennessee)
- Chris Kro – artwork, design
- Rick Alter – management

== Charts ==
Weekly chart performance for Almost Daylight
Chart (2019)	Peak position
US Heatseekers Albums (Billboard)	3
US Independent Albums (Billboard)	12
