= William Strickland (conductor) =

American conductor

William Remsen Strickland (January 25, 1914 – November 17, 1991) was an American conductor and organist, noted for his lifelong promotion of American composers.

== Career ==
Strickland was born in Defiance, Ohio, on January 25, 1914. As a young organist, he served at several prominent Episcopal churches in New York, including Christ Church (Bronxville), Calvary Church (Manhattan), and St. Bartholomew's Church (Manhattan).

Strickland served as guest conductor for the Cathedral Choral Society of Washington, D.C. during World War II. In 1946 he helped found and went on to conduct the Nashville Symphony for five seasons, until 1951. Later he conducted the Oratorio Society of New York.

Strickland was noted for his performances and recordings of contemporary classical works by American composers such as Samuel Barber, John J. Becker, Jack Beeson, William Bergsma, John Alden Carpenter, Henry Cowell, Norman Dello Joio, Vivian Fine, William Flanagan, Miriam Gideon, Irwin Heilner, Alan Hovhaness, Mary Howe, Charles Ives, Frederick Jacobi, Werner Josten, Homer Keller, Harrison Kerr, Edward MacDowell, Douglas Moore, Horatio Parker, Julia Perry, Walter Piston, Wallingford Riegger, Richard Rodgers, Carl Ruggles, Roger Sessions, Leo Sowerby, Louise Talma, Francis Thorne, Lester Trimble, David Van Vactor, Robert Ward, and Elinor Remick Warren. He also conducted and recorded in Iceland, Norway, Poland, Sweden, Finland and Japan. In 1957, the National Music Council recognized Strickland with an award for presenting 28 European concerts of American works, and in 1961 the American Composers Alliance honored him with its Laurel Leaf Award. In 1962–1963, he was Chief Conductor of the Iceland Symphony Orchestra. He made several recordings for CRI (Composers Recordings, Inc.), including works by Henry Cowell, Charles Ives, and the Icelandic composer Jón Leifs.

On November 17, 1991, Strickland died of lung cancer at his home in Westport, Connecticut, at the age of 77. A bequest from his estate helped to establish the William R. Strickland Commission Endowment Fund, which assists in the sponsorship of new musical compositions. His official archives are held by the Library of Congress in Washington, DC and by the Tennessee State Library and Archives in Nashville.
