= Animal Logic (band) =

American rock band

- Animal Logic in 1989

Background information
- Origin: Los Angeles, California, Us
- Genres: Pop; rock; jazz
- Years active: 1987–1991; 2013; 2020—present
- Labels: I.R.S.; Virgin
- Members: Stewart Copeland; Stanley Clarke; Deborah Holland

Animal Logic is an American band formed in 1987 by drummer Stewart Copeland, bassist Stanley Clarke, and singer-songwriter Deborah Holland. The group recorded two albums under the auspices of manager Miles Copeland III (Stewart Copeland's brother and head of I.R.S. Records) before disbanding.

== History ==
=== Formation and initial tour ===
In 1987 Stewart Copeland was working on the opera Holy Blood and Crescent Moon and found himself missing playing drums. Along with bassist Stanley Clarke, he decided to form a band centered around a female singer. They found Deborah Holland after an extensive search, having received her tape from publisher Dan Howell. Andy Summers, Copeland's former bandmate in the Police, played guitar.

In November 1987, they embarked on a short tour of Brazil under the band name Rush Hour. The tour ended in 1988. Summers was concerned about being in a music group with Copeland as it would inevitably attract comparisons to The Police, so he quit the band after the tour ended and returned to his solo works.

=== Animal Logic album (1989) ===
Copeland and Clarke financed the recording of the band's debut album, and began showcasing for labels. They eventually signed with I.R.S. Records, which was headed by Miles Copeland.

The band adopted the name Animal Logic after Miles Copeland misheard the lyrics on a punk band's song as "Animal logic! Animal logic!". The band thought Animal Logic described their music perfectly. After being sued for using the name of a well-known band in the Washington, D.C. area, they bought the rights to use the name.

Miles Copeland envisioned recruiting a well-known guitar player to record the album. He arranged a recording session with Joe Walsh of The Eagles fame, but he did not arrive at the studio. Michael Thompson, who had previously played in a cover band with Deborah Holland, was called in to salvage the session and played on the song "Spy In The House Of Love". Thompson was offered a spot in Animal Logic, but he declined as he was just about to release his own album, Michael Thompson Band, for Geffen Records. Thompson did commit to playing on the rest of the album, as well as a three week tour of Europe. Rusty Anderson, later lead guitarist for Paul McCartney, recorded and toured with the group after Thompson left. The album Animal Logic was released in 1989 on I.R.S. Records in North America, and Virgin Records in other territories.

A promotional music video for "Spy in the House of Love" was released to MTV. The band performed "Spy in the House of Love" on Late Night with David Letterman on November 10, 1989, accompanied by members of Paul Shaffer and the World's Most Dangerous Band.

=== Animal Logic II and breakup (1991) ===
Animal Logic released their second album, Animal Logic II in 1991, which included a duet with Jackson Browne on "Another Place", recorded at Browne's studio in Santa Monica. The album was promoted with a music video for “Rose Colored Glasses”, a song the band also performed on The Tonight Show Starring Johnny Carson on November 7, 1991.

Clarke was unable to tour due to his career as a film composer, which was gaining traction. Rather than look for a replacement, and unable to promote the album, Animal Logic disbanded, and Holland went on to pursue a solo career.

=== Reunions and related activity ===
Both Clarke and Copeland appeared on Deborah Holland’s debut solo album, Freudian Slip (1994).

On September 11, 2013, Copeland posted a Sacred Grove video on YouTube featuring an Animal Logic "reunion". Copeland, Holland and Clarke performed a new song by Holland, "Whipping Boy".

In January 2019, Holland posted several pictures and short videos from a new Animal Logic recording session at the Sacred Grove with Copeland and Clarke online via Facebook. On March 23, 2019, Holland made the announcement on her official Facebook page that she was working on two new EPs – a solo release for 2020, and one with Animal Logic with no set release date. On February 25, 2020 it was announced that she would release her sixth solo album, Fine, Thank You on March 27. The six song offering features performances by Copeland on four tracks.

In a March 2020 interview, Holland confirmed that Animal Logic has been working on material for a new EP: "We're in the process of finishing up five songs though the bulk of the work is now on Stanley's shoulders and he has a crazy schedule so it may take a while."

In October 2022, Holland announced through Facebook that Animal Logic would be releasing two new singles, "Can You Tell Me" and "Ordinary."

== Discography ==
Studio albums

- Animal Logic (1989)
- Animal Logic II (1991)

Singles

Year	Title	CAN	UK	Album
1989	"There's A Spy (In the House of Love)"	58	92	Animal Logic
1989	"As Soon As the Sun Goes Down"	66	-	Animal Logic
1991	"Rose Colored Glasses"	82	-	Animal Logic II

== Band members ==
- Stewart Copeland – drums, guitar, keyboards
- Stanley Clarke – bass
- Deborah Holland – vocals, guitar, keyboards
