= The Refugees (band) =

American folk trio

- Genres: Folk; Pop-rock; Americana
- Years active: 2007–present
- Labels: Wabuho
- Members: Cidny Bullens; Deborah Holland; Wendy Waldman
- Website: www.therefugeesmusic.com

The Refugees are an American folk-rock trio formed in 2007, consisting of Wendy Waldman, Cidny Bullens, and Deborah Holland. Known for their harmonically rich sound and eclectic blend of Americana, folk, and pop influences, the group has garnered acclaim for their engaging performances and distinctive musical style. In May 2023, they released California, an album celebrating the iconic sounds of 1960s and 1970s California music. The trio continues to perform and record, maintaining a dedicated following.

== Biography ==
Grammy-nominated singer-songwriters Wendy Waldman, Cidny Bullens, and Deborah Holland had performed extensively in separate group projects and as solo artists before forming The Refugees in 2007.

They released their debut album, Unbound, on Wabuho Records in 2009. Guitar Player magazine described Unbound as "a rootsy outing replete with catchy arrangements and sparkling three-part vocal harmonies." The trio appeared on NPR's Mountain Stage, performing two songs from the album as well as "Save the Best for Last", a hit single for Vanessa Williams co-written by Waldman, and a cover of Leonard Cohen's "Dance Me to the End of Love".

The Refugees released their second album, Three, in 2012. In a review, Wood & Steel magazine noted that "the trio's rich musical chemistry is readily on display, giving the record a cohesive sound that often feels as intimate as a living room house concert."

After a hiatus, they released the EP How Far It Goes in 2018, reflecting their continued collaboration and evolving musical style. In May 2023, The Refugees released California, an album featuring reinterpretations of classic California sounds from the 1960s and 1970s. The album was produced by Wendy Waldman with Abraham Parker and received praise for its “superb three-part harmonies and heartfelt reinvention of timeless songs.” The trio continues to perform live and work on new material.

== Discography ==
As a female trio

- Unbound (2009)

As a female-and-male trio

- Three (2012)
- How Far It Goes EP (2019)
- California (2023)
