= Irwin Heilner =

American composer

- Born: May 14, 1908; New York, New York, U.S.
- Died: January 18, 1991 (aged 82)
- Occupations: Composer, librarian

Irwin Heilner (May 14, 1908 – January 18, 1991) was an American composer of contemporary classical music. His works are published by American Composers Alliance.

== Early life and education ==
Heilner was born in New York City, the son of Jewish parents, Julius Heilner and Genevieve Stern Heilner. His father was a confectioner, and his mother was a soprano singer.

== Career ==
In 1932, Heilner was a member of the Young Composers' Group, which was founded by the composer Elie Siegmeister and at the home of the composer Aaron Copland. Heilner studied briefly with Nadia Boulanger beginning in the late spring of 1932, on the recommendation of Aaron Copland. In 1936, violinist Lea Luboshutz included a composition by Heilner in her Carnegie Hall recital, and his "Suite for Orchestra" was performed by the New York Women's Symphony Orchestra, also at Carnegie Hall. In 1945, compositions by Heilner were performed at a free concert at the Teachers Union Lounge on Astor Place. His music was conducted and recorded by William Strickland. Sylvia Marlowe and Dorothy Maynor also performed his songs.

Heilner also worked as a librarian at the Julius Forstman Library in Passaic, New Jersey.

== Personal life ==
Heilner was married to Florence Heilner and had two children, including singer-songwriter Deborah Holland. He died in 1991, at the age of 82.
