= Animal Logic (album) =

Studio album by Animal Logic
- Released: 1989
- Studios: Cherokee (Hollywood, California); A&M (Hollywood, California)
- Genre: Rock
- Length: 38:47
- Labels: I.R.S.; Virgin
- Producers: Stanley Clarke; Stewart Copeland

Animal Logic chronology
Animal Logic (1989)	Animal Logic II (1991)

Singles from Animal Logic
- 1. "Someday We'll Understand" Released: 1989; 2. "There's a Spy (In the House of Love)" Released: 1989

Professional ratings
Review scores
Source	Rating
AllMusic	3/5 stars
Hi-Fi News & Record Review	A:1

Animal Logic is the debut studio album by American band Animal Logic. It was released in 1989 by I.R.S. Records and Virgin Records. The album cover depicting three dalmatians was a rejected cover for the Police greatest hits album Every Breath You Take: The Singles. Stewart Copeland liked it so much that he had hung it on the wall of his studio in England, and when his brother and manager Miles Copeland told him about the name "Animal Logic", Stewart volunteered it as the cover for the album.

== Track listing ==
All tracks are written by Deborah Holland except where noted.

No.	Title	Writer(s)	Length
1.	"There's a Spy (In the House of Love)"		4:23
2.	"Someday We'll Understand"		3:45
3.	"Winds of Santa Ana"		3:48
4.	"I'm Through with Love"		3:43
5.	"As Soon as the Sun Goes Down"	Deborah Holland; Frankie Blue	4:34
6.	"I Still Feel for You"		3:15
7.	"Elijah"		4:10
8.	"Firing Up the Sunset Gun"		4:02
9.	"Someone to Come Home To"	Deborah Holland; Bob Mair; Timothy Godwin; Nick Vincent	4:12
10.	"I'm Sorry Baby (I Want You in My Life)"		2:55
Total length:			38:47

== Personnel ==
- Deborah Holland – vocals, lyrics
- Stanley Clarke – bass, strings, producer
- Stewart Copeland – drums, drum programming, producer

Additional musicians

- Michael Thompson – guitar, banjo
- Steve Howe – guitar (tracks: 1, 5)
- Pete Haycock – acoustic guitar (track 4)
- Lakshminarayana Shankar – violin
- Freddie Hubbard – trumpet

Production

- Jeff Seitz – mixing (tracks: 2–10), recording (tracks: 2–7, 9, 10)
- Chris Lord-Alge – mixing (track 1)
- Csaba Petocz – recording (tracks: 1, 8)
- Will Rogers – recording (tracks: 1, 8)
- Scott Gordon – assistant engineering
- Pete Jones – assistant engineering
- Bernard Grundman – mastering
- Michael Ross – art direction
- Ryan Art – artwork and design
- Paul Cox – photography

== Chart history ==
Chart (1990)	Peak position
US Billboard 200	106
