= Bobby Borchers =

American country music singer

- Birth name: Robert Jerome Borchers
- Born: June 19, 1952 (age 72)
- Origin: Cincinnati, Ohio, U.S.
- Genres: Country
- Occupation: Singer-songwriter
- Instrument: Vocals
- Years active: 1976–1987
- Labels: Playboy; Epic; Longhorn

Robert Jerome "Bobby" Borchers (born June 19, 1952 in Cincinnati, Ohio) is an American country music singer.

Borchers was raised in Kentucky. He learned to play guitar at age twelve, and got his first break in the mid-1970s, when Tanya Tucker recorded his song "Jamestown Ferry." In the mid-1970s, recorded for the Playboy Records label. Borchers released two albums for Playboy: Bobby Borchers in 1977 and Denim and Rhinestones a year later. He also charted nine times within the Top 40 of the Hot Country Songs charts, including the number seven "Cheap Perfume and Candlelight" in 1977. Borchers later moved to Epic Records, where he released three singles: "Sweet Fantasy," "Wishing I Had Listened to Your Song" and "I Just Wanna Feel the Magic."

Borchers also owned the Longhorn Ballroom restaurant in Fort Wright, Kentucky in the 1980s. In 1987, he issued two singles on Longhorn Records: "It Was Love What It Was" and "(I Remember When I Thought) Whiskey Was a River."

== Discography ==
=== Albums ===
Year	Album details	Peak chart positions
Year	Album details	US Country
1977	Bobby Borchers: Release date: 1977; Label: Playboy Records	21
1978	Denim and Rhinestones: Release date: 1978; Label: Playboy Records	49

=== Singles ===
Year	Single	Chart Positions	
Year	Single	US Country	CAN Country
1976	"Someone's with Your Wife Tonight, Mister"	29	—
1976	"They Don't Make 'Em Like That Anymore"	32	—
1976	"Whispers"	12	19
1977	"Cheap Perfume and Candlelight"	7	15
1977	"What a Way to Go"	18	—
1977	"I Promised Her a Rainbow"	18	17
1978	"I Like Ladies in Long Black Dresses"	23	—
1978	"Sweet Fantasy"	20	25
1979	"Wishing I Had Listened to Your Song"	32	60
1979	"I Just Wanna Feel the Magic"	43	—
1987	"It Was Love What It Was"	80	—
1987	"(I Remember When I Thought) Whiskey Was a River"	86	—
