= Homer Keller =

American classical composer

External audio
- You may hear Homer Keller's Serenade for Clarinet and Strings performed by Howard Hanson conducting the Eastman-Rochester Symphony Orchestra and Rufus Arey, clarinet in 1941 Here on archive.org

Homer T. Keller (February 17, 1915 – May 12, 1996) was an American composer of contemporary classical music.

He graduated from Oxnard Union High School in Oxnard, California in 1933, after which he attended the Eastman School of Music, where he studied with Howard Hanson, obtaining B.M. (1937) and M.M. (1938) degrees. In 1939 he was awarded US$500 in the 1939 Henry Hadley Foundation competition.

He taught at the University of Michigan (where his notable students included Leslie Bassett, George Balch Wilson, Norma Wendelburg, and Donald Harris) then at the University of Oregon in Eugene, Oregon from 1958 to 1976. His notable students at the University of Oregon include Ralph Towner, Dean C. Taylor, Stephen Scott, and Robert Scott Thompson. Also at the University of Oregon, Keller worked with Jon Appleton to set up that university's electronic music studio.

While at the University of Michigan he also served on the Interlochen Music Camp staff where he helped and influenced many aspiring young musicians including the notable Dwight Beckham in 1950.

His music has been conducted by William Strickland. It is published by the American Composers Alliance.

Keller's last residence was Montclair, California.

The Homer Keller Papers are held by the Eastman School of Music.

== Works ==
- Sonatina No.1 for Piano (1935)
- Symphony No.1 in A Minor (1938)
- Chamber Symphony (1941)
- Sonata for Bassoon and Piano (1941)
- Six Preludes for Piano (1947)
- Sonatina No.2 for Piano (1947)
- Symphony No.2 (1948)
- Magnificat for Chorus and Orchestra (1948)
- Fantasy and Fugue for Organ (1949)
- Sonata for Viola and Piano (1951)
- Sonata for Organ (1952)
- Sonata for Flute and Piano (1953)
- Offertory for Organ (1955)
- Symphony No.3 (1956)
- String Quartet (1958)
- Duo for Violin and Harpsichord (1960)
- 3 Constructs for Piano (1966)
- Declaration for Violin, Cello and Piano (1966)
- Interplay for Chamber Orchestra (1970)
- Sonorities for Orchestra (1970)
- For Behold, I Create New Heavens and New Earth for Chorus and Organ (1971)
- Sonata for Piano (1972)
- Sonata for Cello and Piano (1977)
- Quiet Music for a Tree for Piano (1979)
