= Desire Wire =

Studio album by Cidny Bullens
- Released: 1978
- Studios: Power Station, New York City; Cherokee, Hollywood, California
- Genre: Pop rock
- Length: 37:12
- Label: United Artists
- Producers: Tony Bongiovi, Lance Quinn

Cidny Bullens chronology
Desire Wire (1978)	Steal the Night (1979)

Professional ratings
Review scores
Source	Rating
Christgau's Record Guide	B−
The Rolling Stone Record Guide	2/5 stars

Desire Wire is the debut album by American singer-songwriter and musician Cidny Bullens, released in 1978 on United Artists Records. It was produced by Tony Bongiovi and Lance Quinn.

This album features the track "Survivor", which peaked at number 56 on the Billboard Hot 100 pop singles chart in February 1979. "Survivor" also earned Bullens a Grammy nomination for Best Female Rock Vocal Performance. According to AllMusic, while the album saw critical praise, financial problems caused United Artists to fold shortly after the albums release. Bullens would briefly sign to Casablanca Records for a second album the following year, Steal the Night (1979), before taking an extended break from music until 1989.

== Track listing ==
All songs written by Cidny Bullens except where noted.

Side one

1. "Survivor" – 4:28
2. "Anxious Heart" (Cidny Bullens, Trevor Veitch) – 2:58
3. "Desire Wire" – 4:23
4. "Time ‘N Charges" (Cidny Bullens, Billy Mernit) – 2:50
5. "High School History" – 4:15

Side two

1. "Mean In Your Heart" – 4:58
2. "Hot Tears" – 3:27
3. "Knee Deep In Love" – 5:57
4. "Finally Rockin'" – 3:26

== Personnel ==
=== Musicians ===
- Cidny Bullens – acoustic guitar, electric guitar, lead vocals
- Bob Babbitt, Neil Jason – bass
- Allan Schwartzberg, Jerry Marotta – drums
- Danny Gatton, David Mansfield, Jeff Mironov, Lance Quinn, Mark Doyle – electric guitar
- George Young (tracks: A5), Lou Marini (tracks: A4, B4) – horns
- Harold Wheeler (tracks: A4, B4), Wildwood Horns (tracks: A5) – horn arrangements
- Jerry Peterson (tracks: B1) – horn arrangements, double saxophone
- Harold Wheeler – string arrangements
- Paul Shaffer, Rob Mounsey, Billy Mernit, Leon Pendarvis, Jr. – keyboards
- Ken Bichel, Leon Pendarvis, Jr. – synthesizer
- Jimmy Maelen – percussion
- Cidny Bullens, Jon Joyce, Billy Mernit – backing vocals

=== Technical ===
- Tony Bongiovi, Lance Quinn – production
- Bob Clearmountain, Dee Robb, Don Berman – engineering
- Raymond Willard (as "Rayarella Willhard"), Tom Milmore – assistant engineering
- Trevor Veitch – additional arrangements
- Mick Haggerty, Norman Seeff – design
- Georgina Karvellas, Norman Seef – photography
