= Howling Trains and Barking Dogs =

Studio album by Cidny Bullens
- Released: 2010
- Recorded: California, Tennessee, and Maine
- Studio: Longhouse, Northridge, CA; Radney's House, Nashville, TN; The Roots Cellar, Hallowell, Maine
- Genre: Pop rock
- Length: 45:28
- Label: M.C. Records
- Producer: Cidny Bullens

Cidny Bullens chronology
Live (2006)	Howling Trains and Barking Dogs (2010)

Howling Trains and Barking Dogs is the ninth album by Cidny Bullens, released in 2010 on Blue Rose Records. It was produced by Bullens himself.

AllMusic stated in its review of the album, "Some country creeps into the equation, but it's mostly a steady stream of 4/4 beats and attitude that drives his solid, soulful voice and electric and acoustic guitars, mandolin, or harmonica."

== Track listing ==
1. "Love Gone Good" (Cidny Bullens, Bill Lloyd)
2. "Can't Stop This Train" (Matraca Berg, Cidny Bullens)
3. "In a Perfect World" (Cidny Bullens, Bill Lloyd)
4. "Labor of Love" (Cidny Bullens, Radney Foster)
5. "All My Angels" (Cidny Bullens, Wendy Waldman)
6. "Whistles and Bells" (Cidny Bullens, Radney Foster)
7. "I Didn't Know" (Al Anderson, Cidny Bullens)
8. "Everywhere and Nowhere" (Cidny Bullens, Jimmy Tittle)
9. "Let Jesus Do the Talking" (Cidny Bullens, Kye Fleming, Mary Ann Kennedy)
10. "The Misty Hills of Tennessee" (Cidny Bullens)
11. "Good at Being Gone" (Cidny Bullens)

== Personnel ==
- Cidny Bullens - vocals, acoustic guitar, electric guitar, mandolin, harmonica, percussion
- David Mansfield - fiddle
- Bob Colwell - accordion, keyboards, bass, organ, piano, Wurlitzer piano
- Stephan B. Jones - bass, dobro, guitar, electric guitar
- Justin Maxwell - bass, electric upright bass
- Ginger Coté - drums, percussion
- Reid Bullens-Crewe, Matraca Berg, Deborah Holland, Wendy Waldman, The Ordinaires, Bob Colwell - backing vocals
