= Fish: A Memoir of a Boy in a Man's Prison =

Memoir by T. J. Parsell

Fish: A Memoir of a Boy in a Man’s Prison
- Author: T. J. Parsell.
- Publisher: Da Capo Press
- Publication date: August 30, 2007
- Media type: Print (hardback & paperback)
- Pages: 336
- ISBN: 0-7867-2037-9
- OCLC: 148890660

Fish: A Memoir of a Boy in a Man's Prison is the memoir of T. J. Parsell. It tells the story of his experience in the Michigan prison system, where he was exposed to sexual abuse from fellow inmates. It exposes many injustices and is a prime example of the flaws in the US prison system. It takes place in the 1970s. The book has received praise from a variety of sources.
