= Deborah Holland =

American musician

- Born: Philadelphia, Pennsylvania, U.S.
- Genres: Pop, rock, folk
- Occupations: Singer, songwriter
- Instruments: Vocals, Guitar, piano
- Years active: 1987–present
- Labels: Virgin, I.R.S, RageOn, Gadly, Wabuho
- Website: www.deborahholland.com

Deborah Holland is an American singer-songwriter currently residing in Canada. She rose to national prominence in 1987 as the lead singer and songwriter of Animal Logic, featuring Stanley Clarke and Stewart Copeland. She has since released multiple solo albums and collaborated with the folk trio The Refugees.

In March 2025, Holland released her latest album, I Made It This Far, recorded in studios across California and British Columbia and praised by critics for its introspective songwriting and mature sound.

== Early life and education ==
Holland was born to Jewish parents, Irwin and Florence Heilner, in 1954, and grew up in Passaic and Clifton, New Jersey. She began learning piano at age 5 from her father, Irwin Heilner, who was a classical composer and songwriter.

At age 14, Holland began playing the guitar, writing songs, and performing in New Jersey and New York City. She appeared twice on Izzy Young's Folk Show on WBAI-FM in New York, and in 1969 her song "When I Hear About War" was published in Broadside magazine. She attended the New Lincoln School in New York City (Grades 11-12) where she studied music with Philip Corner and Cathy MacDonald, and also took classes at the Mannes School of Music.

Holland briefly attended the Berklee College of Music, and later received her B.A. in Jazz Studies at Livingston College (Rutgers University) where she studied with, and was mentored by, jazz pianist Kenny Barron.

In 1977, Holland moved to Los Angeles to pursue her career. In 1996 she became the first student to earn a master's degree in Commercial Music from California State University, Los Angeles. In 1997, she joined the faculty there, running the Master's in Commercial Music from 1998-2010.

== Music career ==
=== Animal Logic (1987–1991) ===
In 1987, Holland won the audition to be the lead singer and songwriter of Animal Logic, after a two-song demo tape was forwarded to The Police drummer Stewart Copeland by publisher Dan Howell. She was selected over hundreds of other singers who auditioned for the band. Holland is credited with writing nearly all of the songs recorded by the group.

Animal Logic released their debut album Animal Logic in 1989, peaking at No. 106 on the Billboard 200. A second album, Animal Logic II was released in 1991.

Both albums featured guest appearances from well-known musicians, including: Jackson Browne, David Lindley, George Duke, Steve Howe and Freddie Hubbard.

The band toured and appeared on The David Letterman Show, The Tonight Show, and had videos on MTV and VH1.

In a March 2020 interview with sterwartcopeland.com, Deborah confirmed that Animal Logic has been working on material for a new EP: “We’re in the process of finishing up five songs though the bulk of the work is now on Stanley’s shoulders and he has a crazy schedule so it may take a while.”

=== Solo recordings (1988–2007) ===
In the years following the demise of Animal Logic, Holland released five solo albums, and has recorded and performed music for movies, television and commercials.

In 1988, Holland recorded "Come To Me" from the movie Fright Night Part 2. She also contributed to the I.R.S. Records compilation Just In Time For Christmas (1990), providing the song "It Only Comes Once a Year". In 2000, she recorded a version of "Hanukkah Oh Hanukkah" for Do You Hear What I Hear: A Holiday Folk Tour, hosted by Judy Collins.

Holland has scored five films, including Circuitry Man. In addition, she has had two collaborations with Stewart Copeland that were used in films: "Heaven is a Place" in the 1991 movie Highlander II: The Quickening, and "For One Moment" in the 1992 television movie Afterburn.

More recently, Holland's songs have appeared in the television shows Keeping Up with the Kardashians, My Name Is Earl, and Longmire.

=== The Refugees (2007–Present) ===
In 2007 Holland formed a folk supergroup called The Refugees, with Wendy Waldman and Cidny Bullens. The group released their first album Unbound in 2009, followed by Three in 2012, both showcasing intricate three-part harmonies and roots-influenced songwriting.

After a hiatus, The Refugees reunited to record California, released on May 19, 2023. The album features reinterpretations of classic songs from the 1960s and ’70s associated with California artists including The Beach Boys, The Mamas and the Papas, Jackson Browne, and Sly & the Family Stone. Produced by Wendy Waldman with Abraham Parker at Longhouse Studio in Woodland Hills, California, California was praised for its “superb three-part harmonies and heartfelt reinvention of timeless songs.”

=== Vancouver (2013) ===
Holland's most recent album, Vancouver, was released June 2013. The album is her first CanCon recording and received international radio play. The record charted for over nine months on Roots Music Report's Top 50 Americana/Roots chart and Galaxie Music's Canadian Folk charts. The song “Home” made the finals of the International Acoustic Music Awards.

=== Fine, Thank You! (2020) ===
On March 23, 2019 Deborah made the announcement on her official Facebook page that she was working on 2 new EPs - a solo release for 2020, and one with Animal Logic with no set release date.

On Feb 25, 2020 it was announced that Deborah would release her sixth solo album, Fine, Thank You on March 27. The six song offering was produced by Winston Hauschild and features performances by Stewart Copeland (on four tracks), JUNO-winning backup vocalist Shari Ulrich, and Patterson Barrett on pedal steel.

=== I Made It This Far (2025) ===
In March 2025, Holland released I Made It This Far, her first full-length solo album since The Panic Is On (2020). The record was produced by Holland and mixed by Wendy Waldman and Abraham Parker, featuring contributions from long-time collaborators including Wendy Waldman, Patterson Barrett, Adrian Dolan, and Carl Sealove.

Critics described the album as one of Holland’s strongest works, blending folk, pop, and Americana influences with deeply personal lyrics about perseverance, gratitude, and the creative journey. Americana Highways called it “an album that resonates with honesty and emotional clarity,” while DMME.net praised its “mature artistry and heartfelt reflection.”

== Personal life ==
In 2010, Holland relocated from Los Angeles to Vancouver, BC. In 2011, Holland began teaching songwriting at Langara College in Vancouver.

== Discography ==
=== Solo albums ===
- 1994 – Freudian Slip
- 1997 – The Panic is On
- 1999 – The Book of Survival
- 2006 – Bad Girl Once
- 2013 – Vancouver
- 2020 – Fine, Thank You!
- 2025 – I Made It This Far

=== With Animal Logic ===
- 1989 – Animal Logic
- 1991 – Animal Logic II

=== With The Refugees ===
- 2009 – Unbound
- 2012 – Three
- 2019 – How Far It Goes (EP)
- 2023 – California

=== Compilation albums ===
- 1990 - “Just In Time For Christmas” – IRS Records Compilation
