= T. J. Parsell =

American activist (born 1960)

- Born: July 12, 1960 (age 66); Dearborn, Michigan, U.S.
- Education: New York University (MFA); St. Francis College (BA)
- Occupations: Human rights activist, writer, filmmaker

Timothy J. "T. J." Parsell (born July 12, 1960) is an American writer, filmmaker, and human rights activist committed to ending prison rape. He is best known for his book Fish: A Memoir of a Boy in a Man's Prison, which details the sexual violence he experienced while serving a four-year prison sentence as a teenager.

== Early life and education ==
A native of Dearborn, Michigan, Parsell was incarcerated at age 17 for holding up a Fotomat photo developing booth with a toy gun. During the four years he remained in prison, older inmates sexually assaulted him numerous times.

He completed high school while in prison and later received a Bachelor of Arts degree from St. Francis College in Brooklyn, New York. He is currently working toward a Master of Fine Arts degree in film and television at New York University's Tisch School of the Arts, where he was named a Reynolds Fellow in 2010.

== Career ==
Parsell worked in sales in the software industry from 1982 to 2002, employed by companies such as the New York City Transit Authority and DuPont. He left that field to write and pursue a career advocating against prison rape. In 2006, Parsell authored the book Fish: A Memoir of a Boy in a Man's Prison (Da Capo Press), which has received praise in several reviews. Additionally, he contributed to Dirty Words: A Literary Encyclopedia of Sex (Bloomsbury 2008). He has served as president of Stop Prisoner Rape and is a consultant to the National Prison Rape Elimination Commission. He has published numerous articles, including "Unsafe Behind Bars," a 2005 opinion piece in The New York Times.

== Works ==
=== Publications ===
Parsell has written or contributed to the following publications:

- Fish: A Memoir of a Boy in a Man's Prison. Parsell, T. J., 2006, Da Capo Press, ISBN 978-0-7867-1793-4, 336 pgs.
- Dirty Words: A Literary Encyclopedia of Sex. Sussman, Ellen, 2008, Bloomsbury USA, ISBN 978-1-59691-474-2, 304 pgs.
- "Unsafe behind bars." Parsell, T. J., 2005, The New York Times.

=== Documentaries ===
Parsell is currently working on a documentary about sexual violence in prisons. His other cinematographic works include: 'Sexual Safety Behind Bars, Inmate Orientation Videos for NYS DOCCS for male and female videos "Raise the Age Campaign" Raising the Age of Criminal Responsibility in New York State, (NY Center for Juvenile Justice) 2012

- Avoiding Sexual Assault in Prison, National Institute of Corrections, 2006
- CRISIS, Sickle Cell Anemia, 2008 (edited by Parsell, directed by Nigel Noble)
- Dog Sweat, 2008 (co-editors Peter & Vandy)
- The Making of Taxi to the Darkside, 2008 (directed by Alex Gibney)
- Prison Rape, Sex in Prison, Teen Prison Nightmare
- Teenage & Homeless in America (edited by Parsell, directed by Nigel Noble)
