= Chris Knight (album) =

Studio album by Chris Knight
- Released: February 10, 1998
- Studio: Javelina Studios, Treasure Isle Recorders, Quad Studios and House of Gain (Nashville, Tennessee); Eddy Creek Marina (Lake Barkley, Kentucky)
- Genre: Country, Americana
- Length: 48:28
- Label: Decca
- Producer: Greg Droman Frank Liddell

Chris Knight chronology
Chris Knight (1998)	A Pretty Good Guy (2001)

Professional ratings
Review scores
Source	Rating
Allmusic	4/5 stars
Christgau's Record Guide	A−

Chris Knight is the debut album from country music singer and songwriter Chris Knight. It was released on February 10, 1998, by Decca Nashville. Singles from it were "Framed" and "It Ain't Easy Being Me", although neither charted. "The Hammer Going Down" also appeared on the soundtrack of the 1998 film Black Dog, which was also released by Decca. The Road Hammers later covered the song on their 2005 self-titled debut album.

== Track listing ==
All songs written by Chris Knight except where noted.

1. "It Ain't Easy Being Me" (Chris Knight, Craig Wiseman) – 3:32
2. "Framed" – 3:48
3. "Bring the Harvest Home" (Knight, Wiseman) – 4:10
4. "Something Changed" – 4:14
5. "House and 90 Acres" – 3:52
6. "Summer of '75" (Knight, Sam Tate, Annie Tate) – 3:27
7. "Run from Your Memory" (Knight, Tim Krekel) – 3:02
8. "Love and a .45" (Knight, Fred Eaglesmith) – 3:14
9. "The Hammer Going Down" (Knight, Dean Miller) – 5:30
10. "The Band Is Playing Too Slow" – 3:59
11. "The River's Own" (Knight, Gordon Bradberry) – 5:26
12. "William" – 4:14

== Personnel ==
As listed in liner notes.

- Chris Knight – lead vocals (1–11), acoustic guitar (1, 12), backing vocals (6, 9), electric guitar (8), vocals (12), lead guitar (12)
- Tony Harrell – accordion (1), pump organ (4, 5, 11), Mellotron (10)
- Phil Madiera – Hammond B3 organ (2, 7)
- David Grissom – electric guitar (1, 4–6, 9–11), acoustic guitar (3)
- Kenny Greenberg – National guitar (1), acoustic guitar (2, 4–6, 11), electric guitar (2, 3, 7, 9–11), fuzz pedal (8)
- Dan Dugmore – acoustic guitar (2, 7), electric guitar (2, 7), steel guitar (7)
- Richard Bennett – bouzouki, (1, 4, 11), acoustic guitar (3, 6), electric guitar (5, 10), hi-strung acoustic guitar (9), tiple (11)
- Russ Pahl – steel guitar (3, 4, 6, 8)
- Glenn Worf – bass (1, 3–6, 8–11)
- Michael Rhodes – bass (2, 7)
- Chad Cromwell – drums
- Eric Darken – percussion (1, 3, 5, 6, 11)
- Glen Duncan – fiddle (2, 7)
- Tim Krekel – harmonica (5), backing vocals (7)
- Tammy Rogers – viola (8)
- Christy Seamans – backing vocals (4, 6)
- Kenny Meeks – backing vocals (5, 10)
- Marilyn Martin – backing vocals (8)

=== Production ===
- Frank Liddell – producer
- Greg Droman – producer, engineer, mix engineer
- Joe Hayden – second engineer, mix engineer
- Dan Leffler – second engineer
- John Drioli – production coordinator
- Mark Tucker – photography
- Beth Middleworth – design
- Rick Alter – management
