= Somewhere Between Heaven and Earth =

Studio album by Cindy Bullens
- Released: 1999
- Recorded: Tennessee, New York and California
- Genre: Pop rock
- Length: 50:31
- Label: Artemis
- Producer: Cindy Bullens, Rodney Crowell, Tony Berg, J. Steven Coles

Cindy Bullens chronology
Why Not? (1994)	Somewhere Between Heaven and Earth (1999)	Neverland (2001)

Somewhere Between Heaven and Earth is the fifth album by Cindy Bullens, recorded and released in 1999 on Artemis Records This album is a tribute to her daughter, Jessie, who died from cancer.

== Track listing ==
1. "In Better Hands"
2. "The Lights of Paris"
3. "I Gotta Believe in Something" (featuring Bonnie Raitt)
4. "Somewhere Between Heaven and Earth" (featuring Bryan Adams)
5. "A Thousand Shades of Grey"
6. "Water on the Moon" (featuring Rodney Crowell)
7. "Boxing with God"
8. "The End of Wishful Thinking" (featuring Lucinda Williams)
9. "As Long as You Love" (featuring Reid Bullens-Crewe)
10. "Better Than I've Ever Been" (featuring Mary Ann Kennedy & Bill Lloyd)

== Personnel ==
- Cindy Bullens - acoustic guitar, harmonica, synthesizer, electric guitar, rhythm guitar, percussion, vocals
- Steven Soles - acoustic guitar
- George Marinelli - hi-string acoustic and electric guitars, mandolin
- David Mansfield - violin
- Benmont Tench - piano, Hammond B-3 organ
- Steve Conn - Wurlitzer piano, Hammond B-3 organ
- Mark Jordan - keyboards
- David Santos, Michael Rhodes - bass
- Greg Morrow - drums, percussion
- Rock Lonow - drums
- Tony Berg - electric guitar
- Jeff Levine - piano, organ
- Larry Hirsch - percussion
- Beth Nielsen Chapman, Rodney Crowell, Mary Ann Kennedy, Bryan Adams, Bill Lloyd, Bonnie Raitt, Lucinda Williams - backing vocals

Technical

- Bill McDermott - engineer
- Bob Clearmountain - mixing on "In Better Hands"
