= Heart of Stone (Chris Knight album) =

Studio album by Chris Knight
- Released: August 19, 2008
- Studio: Electric Piggyland (Nashville, Tennessee); The Hat Factory III (Nashville, Tennessee); Westwood Sound Studio (Nashville, Tennessee)
- Genre: Americana; country; alt-country; country rock
- Length: 48:30
- Label: Drifter's Church
- Producer: Dan Baird

Chris Knight chronology
The Trailer Tapes (2007)	Heart of Stone (2008)	Trailer II (2009)

Heart of Stone is the sixth studio album by American country music artist Chris Knight. The album was released on August 19, 2008, via Drifter's Church. It was produced by Dan Baird.

== Track listing ==
All tracks written by Chris Knight, with additional co-writers listed.

No.	Title	Writer(s)	Length
1.	"Homesick Gypsy"	Austin Cunningham	3:51
2.	"Hell Ain't Half Full"	Gary Nicholson	3:38
3.	"Something to Keep Me Going"	Nicholson	4:02
4.	"Heart of Stone"	Dan Baird	4:14
5.	"Danville"	Gavin Sutherland	4:18
6.	"Another Dollar"		3:47
7.	"Almost There"	Gordon Bradberry	4:01
8.	"Crooked Road"	Baird	3:41
9.	"Maria"		4:34
10.	"Miles to Memphis"		4:37
11.	"My Old Cars"	Baird	4:25
12.	"Go on Home"	Nicholson	3:23
13.	"Everybody's Lonely Now"		2:46
Total length:			48:30

== Personnel ==
- Chris Knight – vocals, acoustic guitars
- Michael Webb – acoustic piano, Hammond B3 organ, accordion
- Mike McAdam – baritone guitar (1), electric guitars, slide guitar, banjo, bouzouki, guitar solos
- Dan Baird – electric guitars, guitar solos, tambourine, backing vocals, parade drum (1), baritone guitar (9), slide guitar (11)
- Tammy Rogers – banjo, mandolin, viola, violin, backing vocals (5)
- Keith Christopher – bass
- Michael Grando – drums
- Sonic Fedora – trombone (1)

=== Production ===
- Dan Baird – producer
- Ben Strano – recording, editing, mastering, additional photography
- Mark Tucker – photography
- Rick Bryson – package design, layout
- Rick Alter – management

== Charts ==
Weekly chart performance for Heart of Stone
Chart (2008)	Peak position
US Top Country Albums (Billboard)	37
US Heatseekers Albums (Billboard)	7
US Independent Albums (Billboard)	31
