= Christy Sutherland =

American singer-songwriter

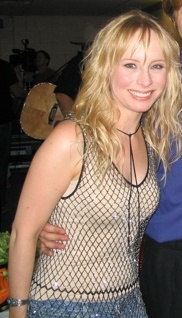
- Christy Sutherland in 2009

Background information
- Born: April 9, 1976 (age 50)
- Origin: Port Lavaca, Texas, United States
- Genres: country, Christian
- Occupations: singer, songwriter
- Instrument: vocals
- Years active: since 2001
- Labels: Giant, Epic

Christy Sutherland (born April 9, 1976) is an American country and contemporary Christian music singer. In 2004 she charted the single "Freedom" on the Billboard Hot Country Songs charts.

== Biography ==
Christy Sutherland was born April 9, 1976, in Houston, Texas, but raised in Port Lavaca, Texas. At the beginning of the 21st century, she moved to Nashville, Tennessee, and worked as a songwriter at Universal Publishing. She was briefly signed to Giant Records prior to the label's closure in 2001.

Signed to Epic Records in 2004, she released her debut single "Freedom" on August 9, 2004. The song peaked at number 53 on the Billboard Hot Country Songs charts. The song was intended for an album titled The Girls Are Alright. Following the closure of Epic Records' Nashville division soon after, Sutherland supported herself by working at a Dillard's department store. While at this job, she chose to began recording contemporary Christian music instead. This included performing for prisoners in Cuero, Texas.

Sutherland starred in the 2015 Christian movie Welcome to Inspiration. In 2019, she was hired as director of music and fine arts at Faith Academy in Victoria, Texas. She provides vocal training through Sutherland Voice Studios from her home in Victoria.

== Personal life ==
Sutherland was married to Matt Dudney, son of Barbara Mandrell, from 2006–2020. They separated in 2018 with Sutherland having custody of their son.

== Singles ==
Year	Single	Peak positions
Year	Single	US Country
2004	"Freedom"	53
