= What a Way to Go (Ray Kennedy album) =

Studio album by Ray Kennedy
- Released: July 17, 1990
- Genre: Country
- Length: 33:44
- Label: Atlantic
- Producer: Ray Kennedy

Ray Kennedy chronology
What a Way to Go (1990)	Guitar Man (1992)

What a Way to Go is the debut studio album by American country music artist Ray Kennedy. It was released on July 17, 1990 via Atlantic Records. The album includes the singles "What a Way to Go", "Scars" and "I Like the Way It Feels".

== Track listing ==
No.	Title	Writer(s)	Length
1.	"Doin' Life Without You"	Ray Kennedy	2:42
2.	"What a Way to Go"	Kennedy, Jim Rushing, Bobby David	2:54
3.	"I Like the Way It Feels"	Kennedy, David, Red Lane	4:04
4.	"All the Love I Need"	Kennedy, David	2:25
5.	"Scars"	Kennedy, David, Don Henry	3:11
6.	"The Storm"	Kennedy	3:39
7.	"I Can See Where You're Comin' From"	Kennedy, Gary Nicholson	3:51
8.	"Cog in the Wheel"	Kennedy, David, Lane	3:47
9.	"The Ruins"	Kennedy, David, Lane	3:11
10.	"I'm Sending One Up for You"	Kennedy, T. Graham Brown, Nicholson	3:50

== Chart performance ==
Chart (1990)	Peak position
US Top Country Albums (Billboard)	51
