= Chris Knight (singer) =

American singer-songwriter

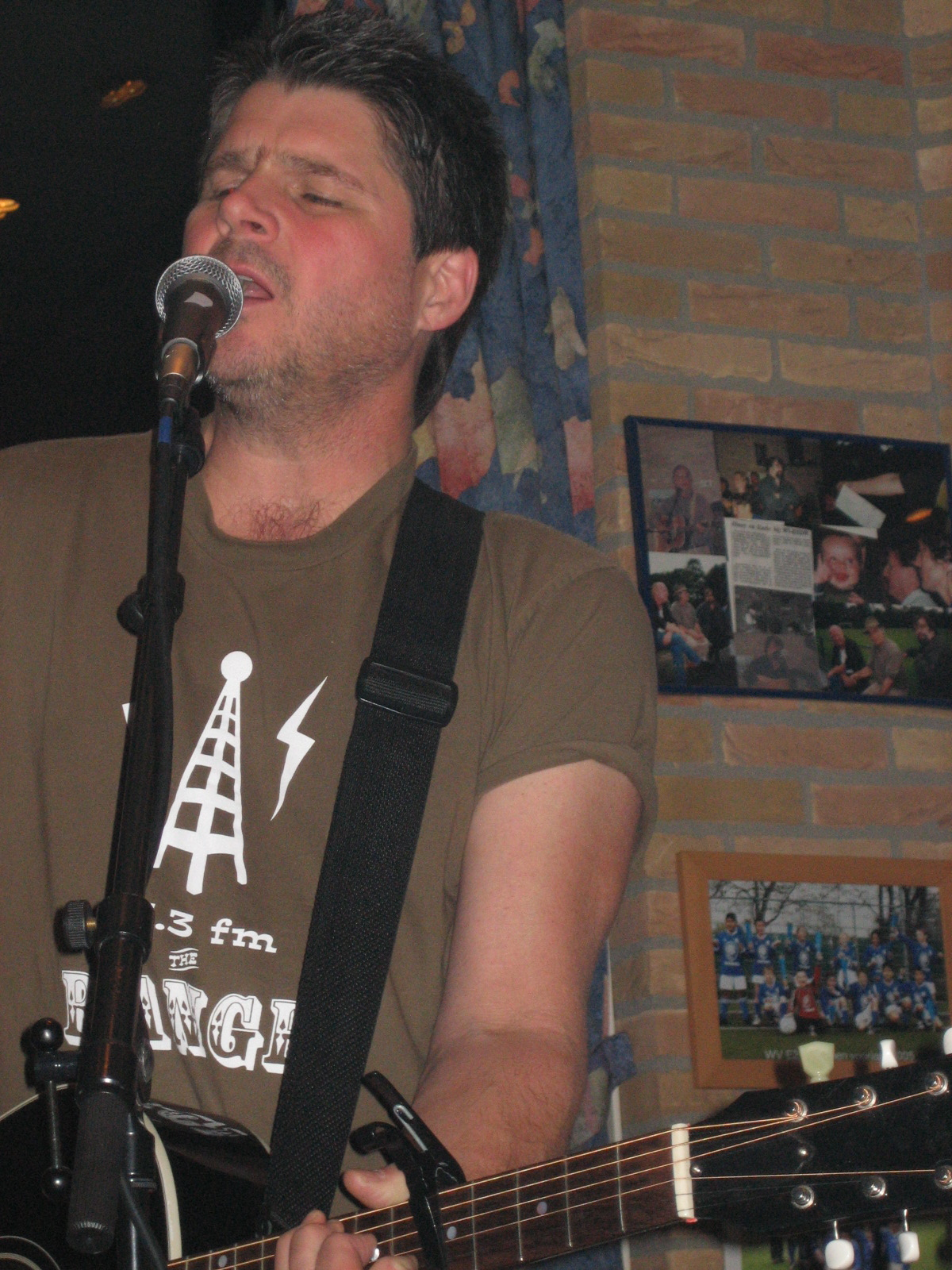
- Chris Knight at WV-HEDW Soccer Club in Amsterdam (February 2, 2007)

Background information
- Birth name: Chris Knight
- Born: June 24, 1960 (age 65); St. Louis, Missouri, U.S.
- Genres: Rock; Folk rock Country rock Americana
- Occupation: Singer-songwriter
- Years active: 1998–present
- Labels: Decca; Dualtone; Drifter's Church Productions
- Website: www.chrisknight.net

Chris Knight (born June 24, 1960) is an American singer-songwriter from Slaughters, Kentucky. In addition to releasing solo records of his own material, Knight has had a successful career writing songs that have been recorded by Confederate Railroad, John Anderson, and Randy Travis among others.

== Biography ==
=== Early life ===
Knight was born in St. Louis, Missouri, and grew up in Slaughters, Kentucky. His extended family lives in the same area of Kentucky. Knight has three brothers and a sister. His father was a pipe liner.

When he was three years old, he asked for a plastic guitar for Christmas. At 15, he became serious and began teaching himself John Prine songs on his older brother's guitar. In an interview, Knight commented "At one point I could play probably 35–40 John Prine songs."

Knight earned a degree in agriculture from Western Kentucky University. He worked for ten years as a mine reclamation inspector and as a miner's consultant for the Kentucky Department of Surface Mining.

== Music career ==
Knight started composing when he was 26, but didn't start performing until he was 30. He got his first record deal when he was 37.

=== Nashville ===
In 1986, he heard Steve Earle on the radio and decided to start writing songs. After six years he came to Nashville and won a spot on a songwriters' night at the Bluebird Cafe.

He attracted the interest of music producer Frank Liddell, who signed him to a contract with Bluewater Music. When Decca Records hired Liddell for an A&R position, Knight received a contract and in 1998 Decca released his self-titled debut. Knight still lived in a 10'-x-15' trailer on 90 acres (36 ha) in Slaughters when the album was released. Decca folded at the end of the 1990s, only two years after Knight joined the label. After a couple years without a label, Knight signed with Dualtone Music Group.

Knight licensed his music to Dualtone Records for two records, then decided to release his music independently with the help of his manager.

=== Texas ===
Knight is well known and because of his particular fame in Texas, was named an "Honorary Texan" in 2006 by Texas Governor Rick Perry.

=== Early releases ===
He recorded his first demo tapes, bootlegged—and then self-released—while living alone in a trailer on his property outside Slaughters. Called The Trailer Tapes, they were officially released in 2007. They were one of his best-selling records.

=== Little Victories ===
It took Knight four years to release Little Victories in 2012. Knight's former Decca labelmate Lee Ann Womack collaborated with him on "You Lie When You Call My Name." Long-time musical hero John Prine sings on the title track. Buddy Miller plays guitar and sings on two tracks: "Missing You" and "Nothing on Me."

== Discography ==
=== Studio albums ===
Title	Album details	Peak chart positions				Sales
Title	Album details	US Country	US	US Heat	US Indie	Sales
Chris Knight	Release date: February 10, 1998; Label: Decca Nashville	—	—	—	—	
A Pretty Good Guy	Release date: September 11, 2001; Label: Dualtone Records	—	—	—	—	
The Jealous Kind	Release date: August 19, 2003; Label: Dualtone Records	67	—	—	—	
Enough Rope	Release date: July 11, 2006; Label: Thirty Tigers	—	—	49	48	
The Trailer Tapes	Release date: April 3, 2007; Label: Thirty Tigers	68	—	40	—	
Heart of Stone	Release date: August 19, 2008; Label: Drifter's Church	37	—	7	31	
Trailer II	Release date: September 15, 2009; Label: Thirty Tigers	64	—	—	—	
Little Victories	Release date: September 11, 2012; Label: Drifter's Church	25	148	4	33	US: 3,000
Almost Daylight	Release date: October 11, 2019; Label: Drifter's Church	—	—	3	12	US: 2,800
"—" denotes releases that did not chart

=== Singles ===
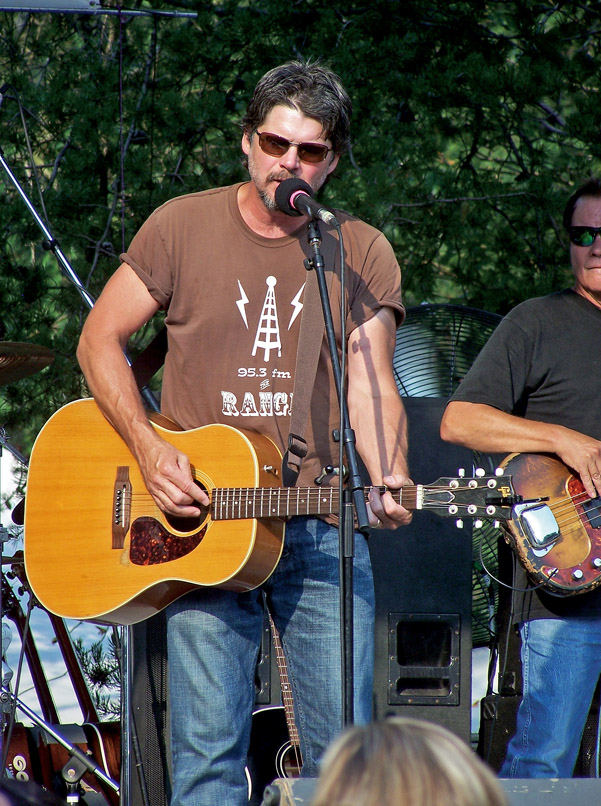
Chris Knight at the Master Musicians Festival in Somerset, Kentucky on July 19, 2008

Year	Song	Album
1998	"Framed"	Chris Knight
1998	"It Ain't Easy Being Me"	Chris Knight
2001	"Becky's Bible"	A Pretty Good Guy
2002	"Oil Patch Town"	A Pretty Good Guy
2003	"The Jealous Kind"	The Jealous Kind
2006	"Cry Lonely"	Enough Rope
2012	"In the Mean Time"	Little Victories

=== Music videos ===
Year	Video	Director
1998	"Framed"	Roger Pistole
1998	"It Ain't Easy Being Me"	Roger Pistole
2002	"Oil Patch Town"	Roger Pistole
2006	"Cry Lonely"	Milton Sneed
2013	"In the Mean Time"	James Weems
2019	"I'm William Callahan"	Nathaniel Maddux

== Songs written or co-written by Knight ==
- "A Pretty Good Guy" – Fred Eaglesmith
- "A Train Not Running" – Stacy Dean Campbell
- "Becky's Bible" – Jason Savory
- "Cry Lonely" – Cross Canadian Ragweed
- "Heart of Stone" – Dan Baird
- "Highway Junkie" – Randy Travis, Gary Allan, The Yayhoos, The Von Ehrics
- "I Don't Want to Hang Out With Me" – Confederate Railroad
- "It Ain't Easy Being Me" – John Anderson, Jason McCoy, and Blake Shelton
- "Love and Gasoline" and "She's Leaving This Town" – The Great Divide
- "Love at 90 Miles an Hour" – Ty Herndon
- "She Couldn't Change Me" – Montgomery Gentry
- "The Hammer Goin Down" – The Road Hammers
- "Devil behind the wheel - Matraca Berg

== Television appearances ==
In 2015, Chris Knight was featured in Season 1, Episode 2 of CarbonTV's original series, American Elements.
