= What a Way to Go (song) =

Single by Ray Kennedy

from the album What a Way to Go
- B-side: "The Storm"
- Released: November 17, 1990
- Genre: Country
- Length: 2:54
- Label: Atlantic
- Songwriters: Jim Rushing, Bobby David, Ray Kennedy
- Producer: Ray Kennedy

Ray Kennedy singles chronology
"What a Way to Go" (1990)	"Scars" (1991)

"What a Way to Go" is a song written by Bobby David and Jim Rushing. It was originally recorded by B. J. Thomas in 1975 and released on the album Help Me Make It (To My Rockin' Chair). A version by Bobby Borchers in 1977 reached No. 18 on the US Billboard Country chart. Also in 1977, a version by Dr. Hook was included on their album, “Makin’ Love and Music”; released as a single, it charted only in Australia where it peaked at number 41.

It was later recorded by American country music artist Ray Kennedy, who released it in November 1990 as the first single and title track from his debut album What a Way to Go. The song reached No. 10 on the Billboard Hot Country Singles & Tracks chart in February 1991. Kennedy's version featured an altered verse from the original.

== Chart performance ==
=== Bobby Borchers ===
Chart (1977)	Peak position
US Hot Country Songs (Billboard)	18

=== Dr. Hook ===
Chart (1977–78)	Peak position
Australia	41

=== Ray Kennedy ===
Chart (1990–1991)	Peak position
Canada Country Singles (RPM)	8
US Hot Country Songs (Billboard)	10

==== Year-end charts ====
Chart (1991)	Position
Canada Country Tracks (RPM)	91
