= Ray Kennedy (country singer) =

American music artist

- Born: May 13, 1954 (age 71)
- Origin: Buffalo, New York, U.S.
- Genres: Country
- Occupations: Singer-songwriter; record producer
- Instruments: Vocals, guitar
- Years active: 1990-present
- Labels: Atlantic
- Website: raykennedyproducer.com

Ray Kennedy (born May 13, 1954) is an American country music artist and record producer. He has recorded two albums for Atlantic Records. Four singles from the albums appeared on the Hot Country Songs charts; 1990's "What a Way to Go" was a top 40 country hit and peaked at No. 10.

Born in Buffalo, New York, Kennedy won a Grammy Award in 2005 in the Best Contemporary Folk Album category for producing Steve Earle's album The Revolution Starts Now. Kennedy has produced many recordings with Earle which are collectively known as The Twangtrust.

Ray Kennedy Jr.'s father, Ray Kennedy, Sr., was a credit manager for Sears, and then a creator of the Discover Card, which launched in 1985. Ray Jr. is married to Siobhan Maher Kennedy.

== Discography ==
=== Albums ===
Title	Album details	Peak positions
Title	Album details	US Country
What a Way to Go	Release date: July 17, 1990; Label: Atlantic Records	51
Guitar Man	Release date: October 27, 1992; Label: Atlantic Records	—
"—" denotes releases that did not chart

=== Singles ===
Year	Single	Peak chart positions		Album
Year	Single	US Country	CAN Country	Album
1990	"What a Way to Go"	10	8	What a Way to Go
1991	"Scars"	58	59	What a Way to Go
1991	"I Like the Way It Feels"	74	80	What a Way to Go
1992	"No Way Jose"	70	—	Guitar Man
"—" denotes releases that did not chart

=== As producer ===
- Happy to Be Here by Todd Snider (2000)
- The Revolution Starts Now by Steve Earle (2004)
- Dream Number 29 by Cindy Bullens (2005)
- Little Victories by Chris Knight (2012)
- Almost Daylight by Chris Knight (2019)
- Good Souls Better Angels by Lucinda Williams (2020)
- Stories from a Rock n Roll Heart by Lucinda Williams (2023)

=== Music videos ===
Year	Video	Director
1990	"What a Way to Go"	Richard Jernigan
1991	"Scars"	Richard Jernigan
1992	"No Way Jose"	Marc Ball
